= Complete blood count =

Routine laboratory test of blood cells

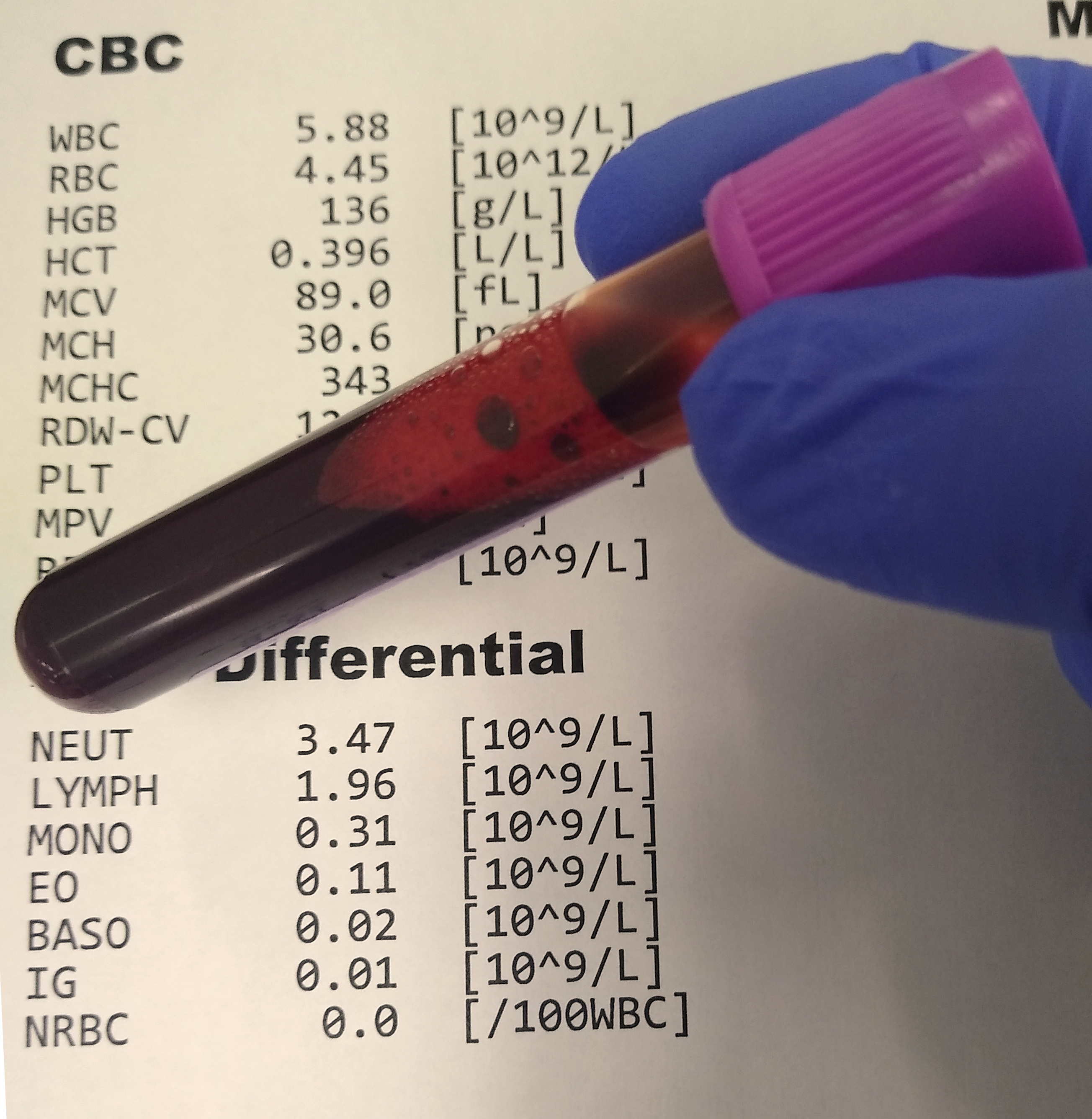
- A CBC specimen in front of a printout displaying CBC and differential results
- Synonyms: Complete blood cell count, full blood count (FBC), full blood cell count, full blood examination (FBE), hemogram
- MeSH: D001772
- MedlinePlus: 003642
- LOINC: Codes for CBC, e.g., 57021-8
- HCPCS-L2: G0306

A complete blood count (CBC), also known as a full blood count (FBC) or full haemogram (FHG), is a set of medical laboratory tests that provide information about the cells in a person's blood. The CBC indicates the counts of white blood cells, red blood cells and platelets, the concentration of hemoglobin, and the hematocrit (the volume percentage of red blood cells). The red blood cell indices, which indicate the average size and hemoglobin content of red blood cells, are also reported, and a white blood cell differential, which counts the different types of white blood cells, may be included.

The CBC is often carried out as part of a medical assessment and can be used to monitor health or diagnose diseases. The results are interpreted by comparing them to reference ranges, which vary with sex and age. Conditions like anemia and thrombocytopenia are defined by abnormal complete blood count results. The red blood cell indices can provide information about the cause of a person's anemia such as iron deficiency and vitamin B12 deficiency, and the results of the white blood cell differential can help to diagnose viral, bacterial and parasitic infections and blood disorders like leukaemia. Not all results falling outside of the reference range require medical intervention.

The CBC is usually performed by an automated hematology analyzer, which counts cells and collects information on their size and structure. The concentration of hemoglobin is measured, and the red blood cell indices are calculated from measurements of red blood cells and hemoglobin. Manual tests can be used to independently confirm abnormal results. Approximately 10–25% of samples require a manual blood smear review, in which the blood is stained and viewed under a microscope to verify that the analyzer results are consistent with the appearance of the cells and to look for abnormalities. The hematocrit can be determined manually by centrifuging the sample and measuring the proportion of red blood cells, and in laboratories without access to automated instruments, blood cells are counted under the microscope using a hemocytometer.

In 1852, Karl Vierordt published the first procedure for performing a blood count, which involved spreading a known volume of blood on a microscope slide and counting every cell. The invention of the hemocytometer in 1874 by Louis-Charles Malassez simplified the microscopic analysis of blood cells, and in the late 19th century, Paul Ehrlich and Dmitri Leonidovich Romanowsky developed techniques for staining white and red blood cells that are still used to examine blood smears. Automated methods for measuring hemoglobin were developed in the 1920s, and Maxwell Wintrobe introduced the Wintrobe hematocrit method in 1929, which in turn allowed him to define the red blood cell indices. A landmark in the automation of blood cell counts was the Coulter principle, which was patented by Wallace H. Coulter in 1953. The Coulter principle uses electrical impedance measurements to count blood cells and determine their sizes; it is a technology that remains in use in many automated analyzers. Further research in the 1970s involved the use of optical measurements to count and identify cells, which enabled the automation of the white blood cell differential.

== Purpose ==
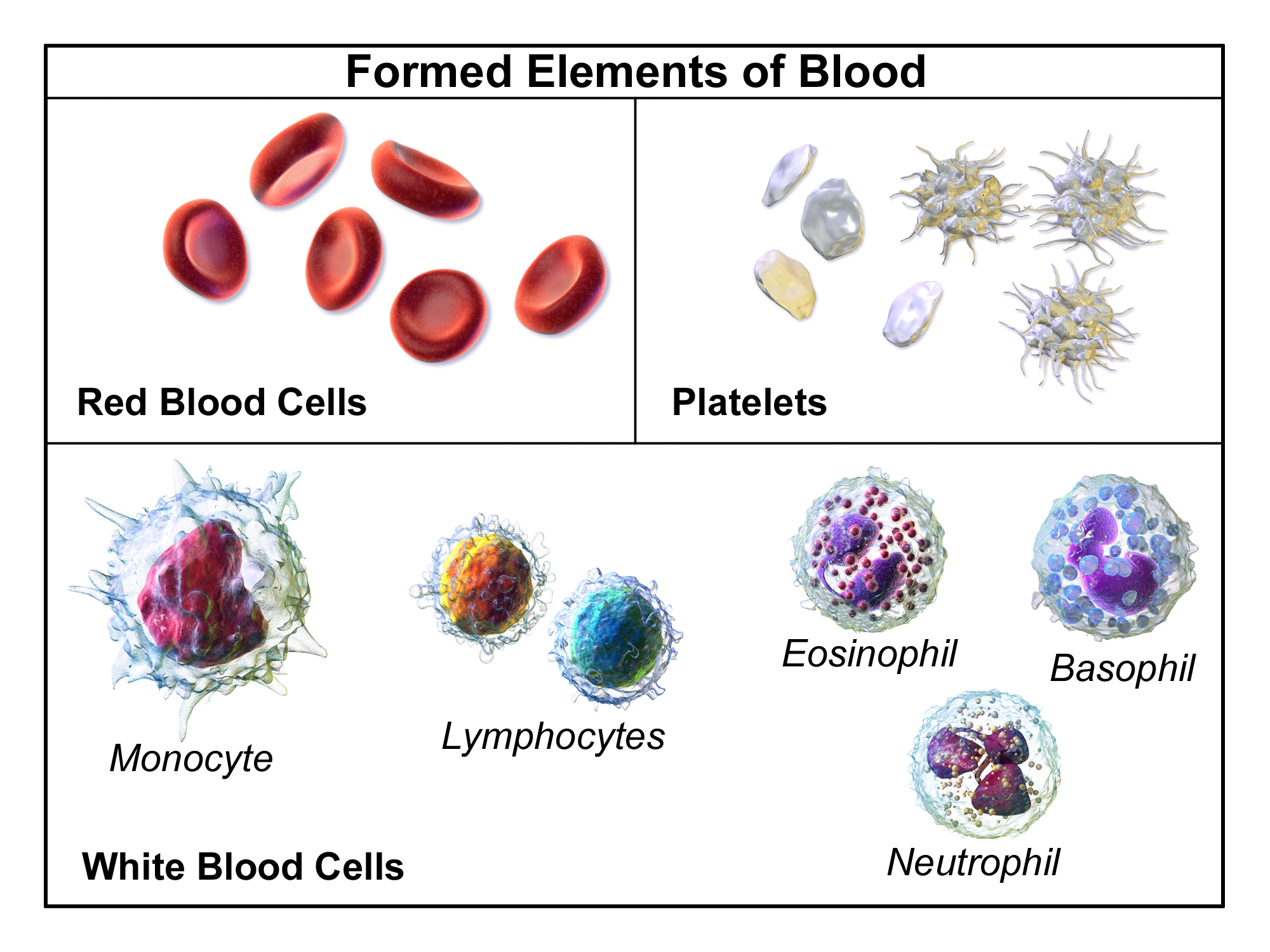
The cells and platelets in human blood. The red blood cells, which carry oxygen are predominant and give rise to the colour of blood. The white blood cells are part of the immune system. The platelets are needed to form clots, which prevent excessive bleeding.

Blood is composed of a fluid portion, called plasma, and a cellular portion that contains red blood cells, white blood cells and platelets. (Note: Though commonly referred to as such, platelets are technically not cells: they are cell fragments, formed from the cytoplasm of megakaryocytes in the bone marrow.) The complete blood count evaluates the three cellular components of blood. Some medical conditions, such as anemia or thrombocytopenia, are defined by marked increases or decreases in blood cell counts. Changes in many organ systems may affect the blood, so CBC results are useful for investigating a wide range of conditions. Because of the amount of information it provides, the complete blood count is one of the most commonly performed medical laboratory tests.

The CBC is often used to screen for diseases as part of a medical assessment. It is also called for when a healthcare provider suspects a person has a disease that affects blood cells, such as an infection, a bleeding disorder, or some cancers. People who have been diagnosed with disorders that may cause abnormal CBC results or who are receiving treatments that can affect blood cell counts may have a regular CBC performed to monitor their health, and the test is often performed each day on people who are hospitalized. The results may indicate a need for a blood or platelet transfusion.

The complete blood count has specific applications in many medical specialties. It is often performed before a person undergoes surgery to detect anemia, ensure that platelet levels are sufficient, and screen for infection, as well as after surgery, so that blood loss can be monitored. In emergency medicine, the CBC is used to investigate numerous symptoms, such as fever, abdominal pain, and shortness of breath, and to assess bleeding and trauma. Blood counts are closely monitored in people undergoing chemotherapy or radiation therapy for cancer, because these treatments suppress the production of blood cells in the bone marrow and can produce severely low levels of white blood cells, platelets and hemoglobin. Regular CBCs are necessary for people taking some psychiatric drugs, such as clozapine and carbamazepine, which in rare cases can cause a life-threatening drop in the number of white blood cells (agranulocytosis). Because anemia during pregnancy can result in poorer outcomes for the mother and her baby, the complete blood count is a routine part of prenatal care; and in newborn babies, a CBC may be needed to investigate jaundice or to count the number of immature cells in the white blood cell differential, which can be an indicator of sepsis.

The complete blood count is an essential tool of hematology, which is the study of the cause, prognosis, treatment, and prevention of diseases related to blood. The results of the CBC and smear examination reflect the functioning of the hematopoietic system—the organs and tissues involved in the production and development of blood cells, particularly the bone marrow. For example, a low count of all three cell types (pancytopenia) can indicate that blood cell production is being affected by a marrow disorder, and a bone marrow examination can further investigate the cause. Abnormal cells on the blood smear might indicate acute leukaemia or lymphoma, while an abnormally high count of neutrophils or lymphocytes, in combination with indicative symptoms and blood smear findings, may raise suspicion of a myeloproliferative disorder or lymphoproliferative disorder. Examination of the CBC results and blood smear can help to distinguish between causes of anemia, such as nutritional deficiencies, bone marrow disorders, acquired hemolytic anemias and inherited conditions like sickle cell anemia and thalassemia.

The reference ranges for the complete blood count represent the range of results found in 95% of apparently healthy people. (Note: The data used to construct reference ranges is usually derived from "normal" subjects, but it is possible for these individuals to have asymptomatic disease.) By definition, 5% of results will always fall outside this range, so some abnormal results may reflect natural variation rather than signifying a medical issue. This is particularly likely if such results are only slightly outside the reference range, if they are consistent with previous results, or if there are no other related abnormalities shown by the CBC. When the test is performed on a relatively healthy population, the number of clinically insignificant abnormalities may exceed the number of results that represent disease. For this reason, professional organizations in the United States, United Kingdom and Canada recommend against pre-operative CBC testing for low-risk surgeries in individuals without relevant medical conditions. Repeated blood draws for hematology testing in hospitalized patients can contribute to hospital-acquired anemia and may result in unnecessary transfusions.

== Procedure ==
CBC performed by the fingerstick method, using an Abbott Cell-Dyn 1700 automated analyzer

The sample is collected by drawing blood into a tube containing an anticoagulant—typically EDTA—to stop its natural clotting. The blood is usually taken from a vein, but when this is difficult it may be collected from capillaries by a fingerstick, or by a heelprick in babies. Testing is typically performed on an automated analyzer, but manual techniques such as a blood smear examination or manual hematocrit test can be used to investigate abnormal results. Cell counts and hemoglobin measurements are performed manually in laboratories lacking access to automated instruments.

=== Automated ===
On board the analyzer, the sample is agitated to evenly distribute the cells, then diluted and partitioned into at least two channels, one of which is used to count red blood cells and platelets, the other to count white blood cells and determine the hemoglobin concentration. Some instruments measure hemoglobin in a separate channel, and additional channels may be used for differential white blood cell counts, reticulocyte counts and specialized measurements of platelets. The cells are suspended in a fluid stream and their properties are measured as they flow past sensors in a technique known as flow cytometry. (Note: In its broadest sense, the term flow cytometry refers to any measurement of the properties of individual cells in a fluid stream, and in this respect, all hematology analyzers (except those using digital image processing) are flow cytometers. However, the term is commonly used in reference to light scattering and fluorescence methods, especially those involving the identification of cells using labelled antibodies that bind to cell surface markers (immunophenotyping).) Hydrodynamic focusing may be used to isolate individual cells so that more accurate results can be obtained: the diluted sample is injected into a stream of low-pressure fluid, which causes the cells in the sample to line up in single file through laminar flow.

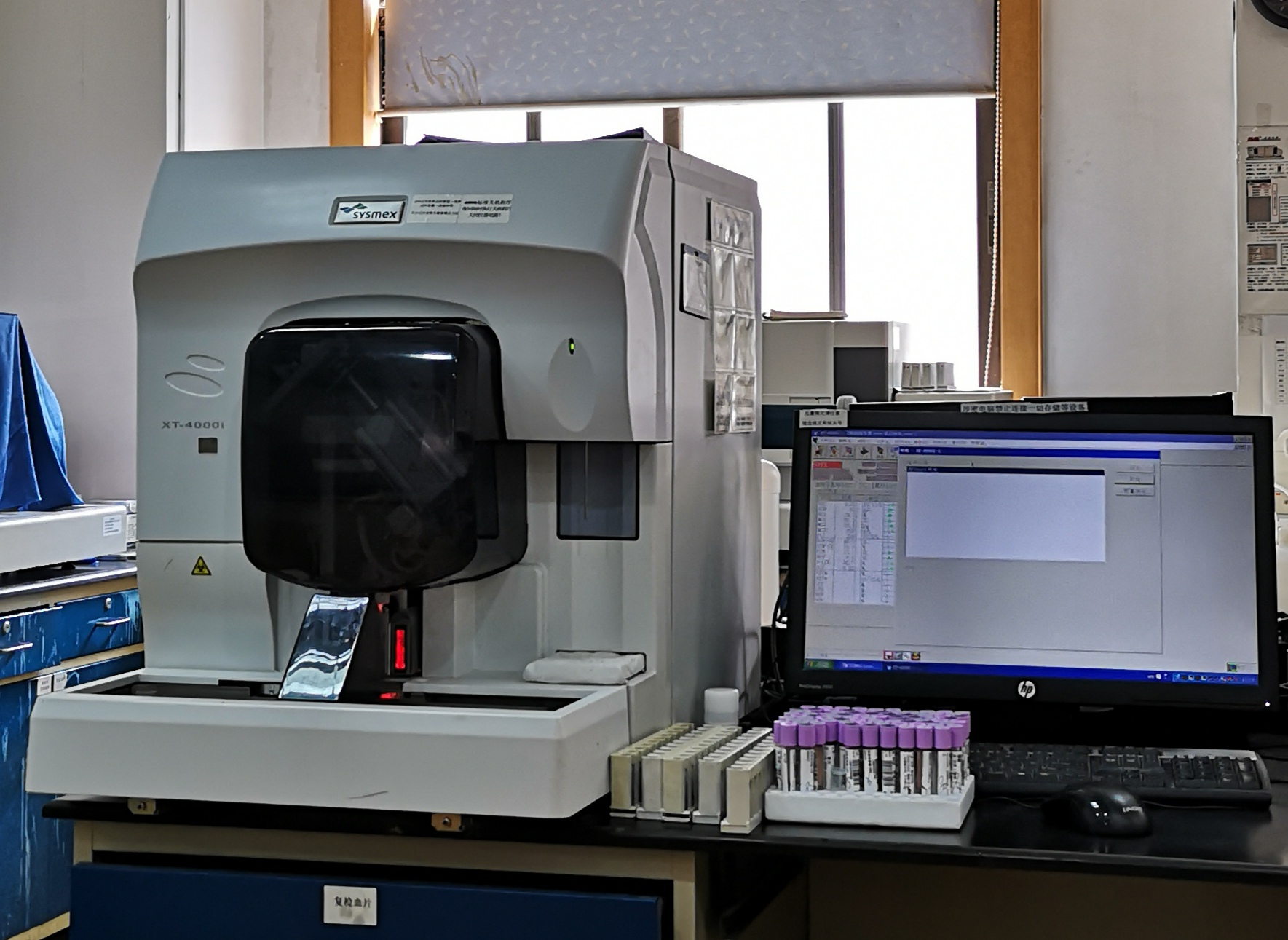
Sysmex XT-4000i automated hematology analyzer

The Coulter principle—the transient current drop is proportional to the particle volume

To measure the hemoglobin concentration, a reagent chemical is added to the sample to destroy (lyse) the red cells in a channel separate from that used for red blood cell counts. On analyzers that perform white blood cell counts in the same channel as hemoglobin measurement, this permits white blood cells to be counted more easily. Hematology analyzers measure hemoglobin using spectrophotometry and are based on the linear relationship between the absorbance of light and the amount of hemoglobin present. Chemicals are used to convert different forms of hemoglobin, such as oxyhemoglobin and carboxyhemoglobin, to one stable form, usually cyanmethemoglobin, and to create a permanent colour change. The absorbance of the resulting colour, when measured at a specific wavelength—usually 540 nanometres—corresponds with the concentration of hemoglobin.

Sensors count and identify the cells in the sample using two main principles: electrical impedance and light scattering. Impedance-based cell counting operates on the Coulter principle: cells are suspended in a fluid carrying an electric current, and as they pass through a small opening (an aperture), they cause decreases in current because of their poor electrical conductivity. The amplitude of the voltage pulse generated as a cell crosses the aperture correlates with the amount of fluid displaced by the cell, and thus the cell's volume, while the total number of pulses correlates with the number of cells in the sample. The distribution of cell volumes is plotted on a histogram, and by setting volume thresholds based on the typical sizes of each type of cell, the different cell populations can be identified and counted.

In light scattering techniques, light from a laser or a tungsten-halogen lamp is directed at the stream of cells to collect information about their size and structure. Cells scatter light at different angles as they pass through the beam, which is detected using photometers. Forward scatter, which refers to the amount of light scattered along the beam's axis, is mainly caused by diffraction of light and correlates with cellular size, while side scatter (light scattered at a 90-degree angle) is caused by reflection and refraction and provides information about cellular complexity.

Radiofrequency-based methods can be used in combination with impedance. These techniques work on the same principle of measuring the interruption in current as cells pass through an aperture, but since the high-frequency RF current penetrates into the cells, the amplitude of the resulting pulse relates to factors like the relative size of the nucleus, the nucleus's structure, and the amount of granules in the cytoplasm. Small red cells and cellular debris, which are similar in size to platelets, may interfere with the platelet count, and large platelets may not be counted accurately, so some analyzers use additional techniques to measure platelets, such as fluorescent staining, multi-angle light scatter and monoclonal antibody tagging.

Most analyzers directly measure the average size of red blood cells, which is called the mean cell volume (MCV), and calculate the hematocrit by multiplying the red blood cell count by the MCV. Some measure the hematocrit by comparing the total volume of red blood cells to the volume of blood sampled, and derive the MCV from the hematocrit and red blood cell count. The hemoglobin concentration, the red blood cell count and the hematocrit are used to calculate the average amount of hemoglobin within each red blood cell, the mean corpuscular hemoglobin (MCH); and its concentration, the mean corpuscular hemoglobin concentration (MCHC). Another calculation, the red blood cell distribution width (RDW), is derived from the standard deviation of the mean cell volume and reflects variation in cellular size.

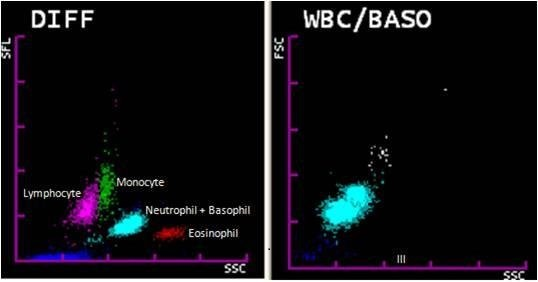
Example of a white blood cell differential scattergram: differently coloured clusters indicate different cell populations

After being treated with reagents, white blood cells form three distinct peaks when their volumes are plotted on a histogram. These peaks correspond roughly to populations of granulocytes, lymphocytes, and other mononuclear cells, allowing a three-part differential to be performed based on cell volume alone. More advanced analyzers use additional techniques to provide a five- to seven-part differential, such as light scattering or radiofrequency analysis, or using dyes to stain specific chemicals inside cells—for example, nucleic acids, which are found in higher concentrations in immature cells or myeloperoxidase, an enzyme found in cells of the myeloid lineage. Basophils may be counted in a separate channel where a reagent destroys other white cells and leaves basophils intact. The data collected from these measurements is analyzed and plotted on a scattergram, where it forms clusters that correlate with each white blood cell type. Another approach to automating the differential count is the use of digital microscopy software, which uses artificial intelligence to classify white blood cells from photomicrographs of the blood smear. The cell images are displayed to a human operator, who can manually re-classify the cells if necessary.

Most analyzers take less than a minute to run all the tests in the complete blood count. Because analyzers sample and count many individual cells, the results are very precise. However, some abnormal cells may not be identified correctly, requiring manual review of the instrument's results and identification by other means of abnormal cells the instrument could not categorize.

==== Point-of-care testing ====
Point-of-care testing refers to tests conducted outside of the laboratory setting, such as at a person's bedside or in a clinic. This method of testing is faster and uses less blood than conventional methods, and does not require specially trained personnel, so it is useful in emergency situations and in areas with limited access to resources. Commonly used devices for point-of-care hematology testing include the HemoCue, a portable analyzer that uses spectrophotometry to measure the hemoglobin concentration of the sample, and the i-STAT, which derives a hemoglobin reading by estimating the concentration of red blood cells from the conductivity of the blood. Hemoglobin and hematocrit can be measured on point-of-care devices designed for blood gas testing, but these measurements sometimes correlate poorly with those obtained through standard methods. There are simplified versions of hematology analyzers designed for use in clinics that can provide a complete blood count and differential.

=== Manual ===
Manual determination of hematocrit. The blood has been centrifuged, separating it into red blood cells and plasma.

The tests can be performed manually when automated equipment is not available or when the analyzer results indicate that further investigation is needed. Automated results are flagged for manual blood smear review in 10–25% of cases, which may be due to abnormal cell populations that the analyzer cannot properly count, internal flags generated by the analyzer that suggest the results could be inaccurate, or numerical results that fall outside set thresholds. To investigate these issues, blood is spread on a microscope slide, stained with a Romanowsky stain, and examined under a microscope. The appearance of the red and white blood cells and platelets is assessed, and qualitative abnormalities are reported if present. Changes in the appearance of red blood cells can have considerable diagnostic significance—for example, the presence of sickle cells is indicative of sickle cell disease, and a high number of fragmented red blood cells (schistocytes) requires urgent investigation as it can suggest a microangiopathic hemolytic anemia. In some inflammatory conditions and in paraprotein disorders like multiple myeloma, high levels of protein in the blood may cause red blood cells to appear stacked together on the smear, which is termed rouleaux. Some parasitic diseases, such as malaria and babesiosis, can be detected by finding the causative organisms on the blood smear, and the platelet count can be estimated from the blood smear, which is useful if the automated platelet count is inaccurate.

To perform a manual white blood cell differential, the microscopist counts 100 cells on the blood smear and classifies them based on their appearance; sometimes 200 cells are counted. This gives the percentage of each type of white blood cell, and by multiplying these percentages by the total number of white blood cells, the absolute number of each type of white cell can be obtained. Manual counting is subject to sampling error because so few cells are counted compared with automated analysis, but it can identify abnormal cells that analyzers cannot, such as the blast cells seen in acute leukaemia. Clinically significant features like toxic granulation and vacuolation can also be ascertained from microscopic examination of white blood cells.

The hematocrit can performed manually by filling a capillary tube with blood, centrifuging it, and measuring the percentage of the blood that consists of red blood cells. This is useful in some conditions that can cause automated hematocrit results to be incorrect, such as polycythemia (a highly elevated red blood cell count) or severe leukocytosis (a highly elevated white blood cell count, which interferes with red blood cell measurements by causing white blood cells to be counted as red cells).

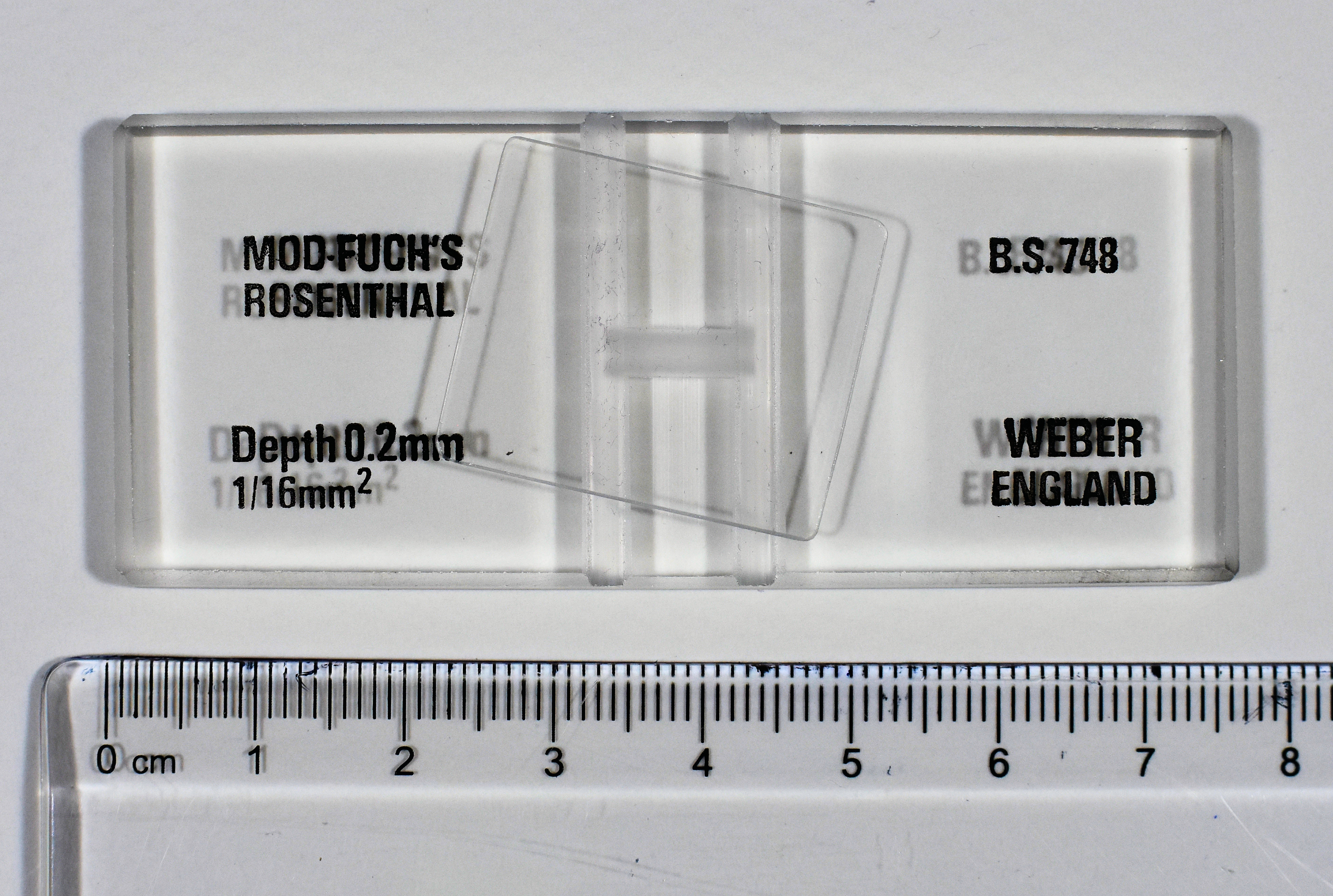
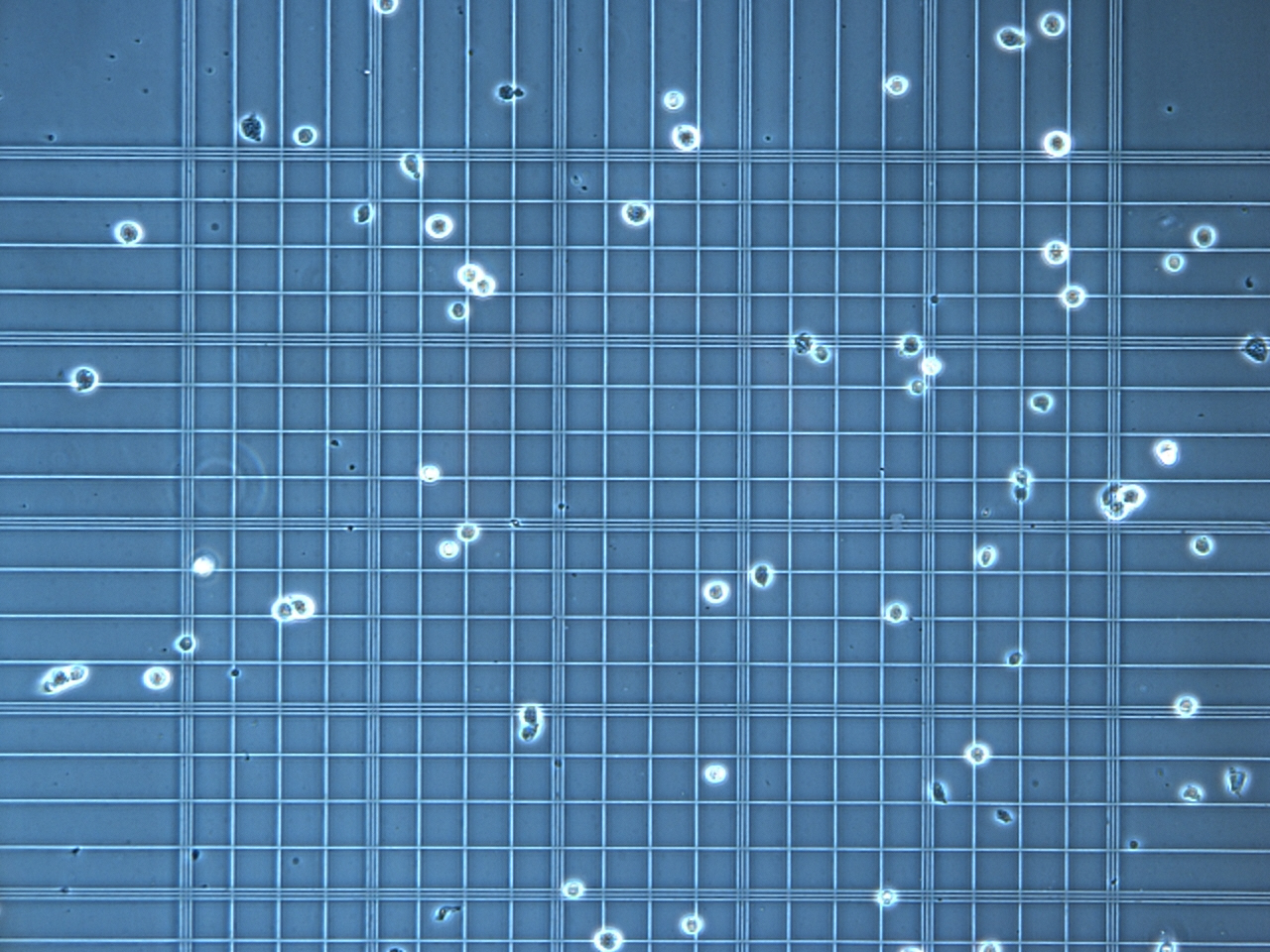
Left: A modified Fuchs-Rosenthal hemocytometer. Right: View through the microscope of the hemocytometer. The built-in grid helps to keep track of which cells have been counted.

Red and white blood cells and platelets can be counted using a hemocytometer, a microscope slide containing a chamber that holds a specified volume of diluted blood. The hemocytometer's chamber is etched with a calibrated grid to aid in cell counting. The cells seen in the grid are counted and divided by the volume of blood examined, which is determined from the number of squares counted on the grid, to obtain the concentration of cells in the sample. Manual cell counts are labour-intensive and inaccurate compared to automated methods, so they are rarely used except in laboratories that do not have access to automated analyzers. To count white blood cells, the sample is diluted using a fluid containing a compound that lyses red blood cells, such as ammonium oxalate, acetic acid, or hydrochloric acid. Sometimes a stain is added to the diluent that highlights the nuclei of white blood cells, making them easier to identify. Manual platelet counts are performed in a similar manner, although some methods leave the red blood cells intact. Using a phase-contrast microscope, rather than a light microscope, can make platelets easier to identify. The manual red blood cell count is rarely performed, as it is inaccurate and other methods such as hemoglobinometry and the manual hematocrit are available for assessing red blood cells; but if it is necessary to do so, red blood cells can be counted in blood that has been diluted with saline.

Hemoglobin can be measured manually using a spectrophotometer or colorimeter. To measure hemoglobin manually, the sample is diluted using reagents that destroy red blood cells to release the hemoglobin. Other chemicals are used to convert different types of hemoglobin to one form, allowing it to be easily measured. The solution is then placed in a measuring cuvette and the absorbance is measured at a specific wavelength, which depends on the type of reagent used. A reference standard containing a known amount of hemoglobin is used to determine the relationship between the absorbance and the hemoglobin concentration, allowing the hemoglobin level of the sample to be measured.

In rural and economically disadvantaged areas, available testing is limited by access to equipment and personnel. At primary care facilities in these regions, testing may be limited to examination of red cell morphology and manual measurement of hemoglobin, while more complex techniques like manual cell counts and differentials, and sometimes automated cell counts, are performed at district laboratories. Regional and provincial hospitals and academic centres typically have access to automated analyzers. Where laboratory facilities are not available, an estimate of hemoglobin concentration can be obtained by placing a drop of blood on a standardized type of absorbent paper and comparing it to a colour scale.

=== Quality control ===
Automated analyzers have to be regularly calibrated. Most manufacturers provide preserved blood with defined parameters and the analyzers are adjusted if the results are outside defined thresholds. To ensure that results continue to be accurate, quality control samples, which are typically provided by the instrument manufacturer, are tested at least once per day. The samples are formulated to provide specific results, and laboratories compare their results against the known values to ensure the instrument is functioning properly. For laboratories without access to commercial quality control material, an Indian regulatory organization recommends running patient samples in duplicate and comparing the results. A moving average measurement, in which the average results for patient samples are measured at set intervals, can be used as an additional quality control technique. Assuming that the characteristics of the patient population remain roughly the same over time, the average should remain constant; large shifts in the average value can indicate instrument problems. The MCHC values are particularly useful in this regard.

In addition to analyzing internal quality control samples with known results, laboratories may receive external quality assessment samples from regulatory organizations. While the purpose of internal quality control is to ensure that analyzer results are reproducible within a given laboratory, external quality assessment verifies that results from different laboratories are consistent with each other and with the target values. The expected results for external quality assessment samples are not disclosed to the laboratory. External quality assessment programs have been widely adopted in North America and western Europe, and laboratories are often required to participate in these programs to maintain accreditation. Logistical issues may make it difficult for laboratories in under-resourced areas to implement external quality assessment schemes.

== Included tests ==
Analyte	Meaning
WBC	White blood cell concentration
RBC	Red blood cell concentration
HGB	Hemoglobin concentration
HCT	Hematocrit fraction
MCV	Mean cell volume
MCH	Mean corpuscular hemoglobin mass
MCHC	Mean corpuscular hemoglobin concentration
RDW-CV	Red blood cell volume distribution width calculated as a percentage
RDW-SD	Red blood cell volume distribution width at 20% histogram height
PLT	Platelet concentration
MPV	Mean platelet volume
NEUT	Neutrophil concentration and/or fraction
LYMPH	Lymphocyte concentration and/or fraction
MONO	Monocyte concentration and/or fraction
EO	Eosinophil concentration and/or fraction
BASO	Basophil concentration and/or fraction
IG	Immature granulocyte concentration and/or fraction
NRBC	Nucleated red blood cell concentration and/or fraction

The CBC measures the amounts of platelets and red and white blood cells, along with the hemoglobin and hematocrit values. Red blood cell indices—MCV, MCH and MCHC—which describe the size of red blood cells and their hemoglobin content, are reported along with the red blood cell distribution width (RDW), which measures the amount of variation in the sizes of red blood cells. A white blood cell differential, which enumerates the different types of white blood cells, may be performed, and a count of immature red blood cells (reticulocytes) is sometimes included.

=== Red blood cells, hemoglobin, and hematocrit ===
Sample CBC in microcytic anemia
Analyte	Result	Normal range
Red cell count	5.5 × 10^{12}/L	4.5–5.7
White cell count	9.8 × 10^{9}/L	4.0–10.0
Hemoglobin	123 g/L	133–167
Hematocrit	0.42	0.35–0.53
MCV	76 fL	77–98
MCH	22.4 pg	26–33
MCHC	293 g/L	330–370
RDW	14.5%	10.3–15.3

An example of CBC results showing a low hemoglobin, MCV, MCH and MCHC. The person was anemic. The cause could be iron deficiency or a hemoglobinopathy.

Red blood cells deliver oxygen from the lungs to the tissues and on their return carry carbon dioxide back to the lungs where it is exhaled. These functions are mediated by the cells' hemoglobin. The analyzer counts red blood cells, reporting the result in units of 10^{6} cells per microlitre of blood (× 10^{6}/μL) or 10^{12} cells per litre (× 10^{12}/L), and measures their average size, which is called the mean cell volume and expressed in femtolitres or cubic micrometres. By multiplying the mean cell volume by the red blood cell count, the hematocrit (HCT) or packed cell volume (PCV), a measurement of the percentage of blood that is made up of red blood cells, can be derived; and when the hematocrit is performed directly, the mean cell volume may be calculated from the hematocrit and red blood cell count. Hemoglobin, measured after the red blood cells are lysed, is usually reported in units of grams per litre (g/L) or grams per decilitre (g/dL). Assuming that the red blood cells are normal, there is a constant relationship between hemoglobin and hematocrit: the hematocrit percentage is approximately three times greater than the hemoglobin value in g/dL, plus or minus three. This relationship, called the rule of three, can be used to confirm that CBC results are correct.

Two other measurements are calculated from the red blood cell count, the hemoglobin concentration, and the hematocrit: the mean corpuscular hemoglobin and the mean corpuscular hemoglobin concentration. These parameters describe the hemoglobin content of each red blood cell. The MCH and MCHC can be confusing; in essence the MCH is a measure of the average amount of hemoglobin per red blood cell. The MCHC gives the average proportion of the cell that is hemoglobin. The MCH does not take into account the size of the red blood cells whereas the MCHC does. Collectively, the MCV, MCH, and MCHC are referred to as the red blood cell indices. Changes in these indices are visible on the blood smear: red blood cells that are abnormally large or small can be identified by comparison to the sizes of white blood cells, and cells with a low hemoglobin concentration appear pale. Another parameter is calculated from the initial measurements of red blood cells: the red blood cell distribution width or RDW, which reflects the degree of variation in the cells' size.

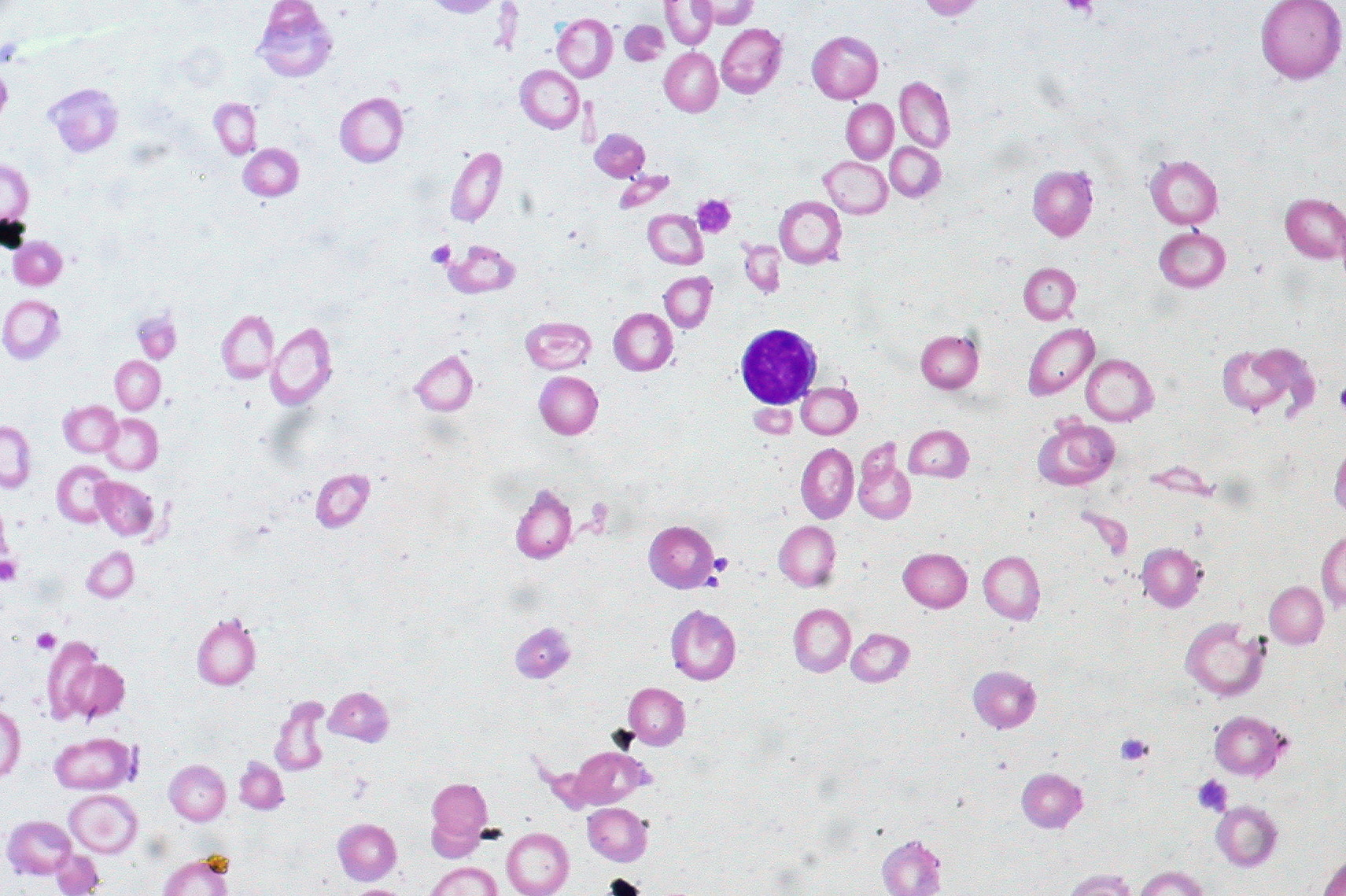
Blood smear from a person with iron deficiency anemia, displaying characteristic red blood cell morphology. The red blood cells are abnormally small (microcytosis), have large areas of central pallor (hypochromia), and vary greatly in size (anisocytosis).

An abnormally low hemoglobin, hematocrit, or red blood cell count indicates anemia. Anemia is not a diagnosis on its own, but it points to an underlying condition affecting the person's red blood cells. General causes of anemia include blood loss, production of defective red blood cells (ineffective erythropoeisis), decreased production of red blood cells (insufficient erythropoeisis), and increased destruction of red blood cells (hemolytic anemia). Anemia reduces the blood's ability to carry oxygen, causing symptoms like tiredness and shortness of breath. If the hemoglobin level falls below thresholds based on the person's clinical condition, a blood transfusion may be necessary.

An increased number of red blood cells, leading to an increase in the hemoglobin and hematocrit, (Note: This is not always the case. In some types of thalassemia, for example, a high red blood cell count occurs alongside a low or normal hemoglobin, as the red blood cells are very small. The Mentzer index, which compares the MCV to the RBC count, can be used to distinguish between iron deficiency anemia and thalassemia.) is called polycythemia. Dehydration or use of diuretics can cause a "relative" polycythemia by decreasing the amount of plasma compared to red cells. A true increase in the number of red blood cells, called absolute polycythemia, can occur when the body produces more red blood cells to compensate for chronically low oxygen levels in conditions like lung or heart disease, or when a person has abnormally high levels of erythropoietin, a hormone that stimulates production of red blood cells. In polycythemia vera, the bone marrow produces red cells and other blood cells at an excessively high rate.

Evaluation of red blood cell indices is helpful in determining the cause of anemia. If the MCV is low, the anemia is termed microcytic, while anemia with a high MCV is called macrocytic anemia. Anemia with a low MCHC is called hypochromic anemia. If anemia is present but the red blood cell indices are normal, the anemia is considered normochromic and normocytic. The term hyperchromia, referring to a high MCHC, is generally not used. Elevation of the MCHC above the upper reference value is rare, mainly occurring in conditions such as spherocytosis, sickle cell disease and hemoglobin C disease. An elevated MCHC can also be a false result from conditions like red blood cell agglutination (which causes a false decrease in the red blood cell count, elevating the MCHC) or highly elevated amounts of lipids in the blood (which causes a false increase in the hemoglobin result).

Microcytic anemia is typically associated with iron deficiency, thalassemia, and anemia of chronic disease, while macrocytic anemia is associated with alcoholism, folate and B12 deficiency, use of some drugs, and some bone marrow diseases. Acute blood loss, hemolytic anemia, bone marrow disorders, and various chronic diseases can result in anemia with a normocytic blood picture. The MCV serves an additional purpose in laboratory quality control. It is relatively stable over time compared to other CBC parameters, so a large change in MCV may indicate that the sample was drawn from the wrong patient.

A low RDW has no clinical significance, but an elevated RDW represents increased variation in red blood cell size, a condition known as anisocytosis. Anisocytosis is common in nutritional anemias such as iron deficiency anemia and anemia due to vitamin B12 or folate deficiency, while people with thalassemia may have a normal RDW. Based on the CBC results, further steps can be taken to investigate anemia, such as a ferritin test to confirm the presence of iron deficiency, or hemoglobin electrophoresis to diagnose a hemoglobinopathy such as thalassemia or sickle cell disease.

=== White blood cells ===
Sample CBC in chronic myeloid leukaemia

Analyte	Result
White cell count	98.8 × 10^{9}/L
Hemoglobin	116 g/L
Hematocrit	0.349 L/L
MCV	89.0 fL
Platelet count	1070 × 10^{9}/L

Analyte	Result
Neutrophils	48%
Lymphocytes	3%
Monocytes	4%
Eosinophils	3%
Basophils	21%
Band neutrophils	8%
Metamyelocytes	3%
Myelocytes	8%
Blast cells	2%

The white blood cell and platelet counts are markedly increased, and anemia is present. The differential count shows basophilia and the presence of band neutrophils, immature granulocytes and blast cells.

White blood cells defend against infections and are involved in the inflammatory response. A high white blood cell count, which is called leukocytosis, often occurs in infections, inflammation, and states of physiologic stress. It can also be caused by diseases that involve abnormal production of blood cells, such as myeloproliferative and lymphoproliferative disorders. A decreased white blood cell count, termed leukopenia, can lead to an increased risk of acquiring infections, and occurs in treatments like chemotherapy and radiation therapy and many conditions that inhibit the production of blood cells. Sepsis is associated with both leukocytosis and leukopenia. The total white blood cell count is usually reported in cells per microlitre of blood (/μL) or 10^{9} cells per litre (× 10^{9}/L).

In the white blood cell differential, the different types of white blood cells are identified and counted. The results are reported as a percentage and as an absolute number per unit volume. Five types of white blood cells—neutrophils, lymphocytes, monocytes, eosinophils, and basophils—are typically measured. Some instruments report the number of immature granulocytes, which is a classification consisting of precursors of neutrophils; specifically, promyelocytes, myelocytes and metamyelocytes. (Note: Automated instruments group these three types of cells together under the "immature granulocyte" classification, but they are counted separately in the manual differential.) Other cell types are reported if they are identified in the manual differential.

Differential results are useful in diagnosing and monitoring many medical conditions. For example, an elevated neutrophil count (neutrophilia) is associated with bacterial infection, inflammation, and myeloproliferative disorders, while a decreased count (neutropenia) may occur in individuals who are undergoing chemotherapy or taking certain drugs, or who have diseases affecting the bone marrow. Neutropenia can also be caused by some congenital disorders and may occur transiently after viral or bacterial infections in children. People with severe neutropenia and clinical signs of infection are treated with antibiotics to prevent potentially life-threatening disease.

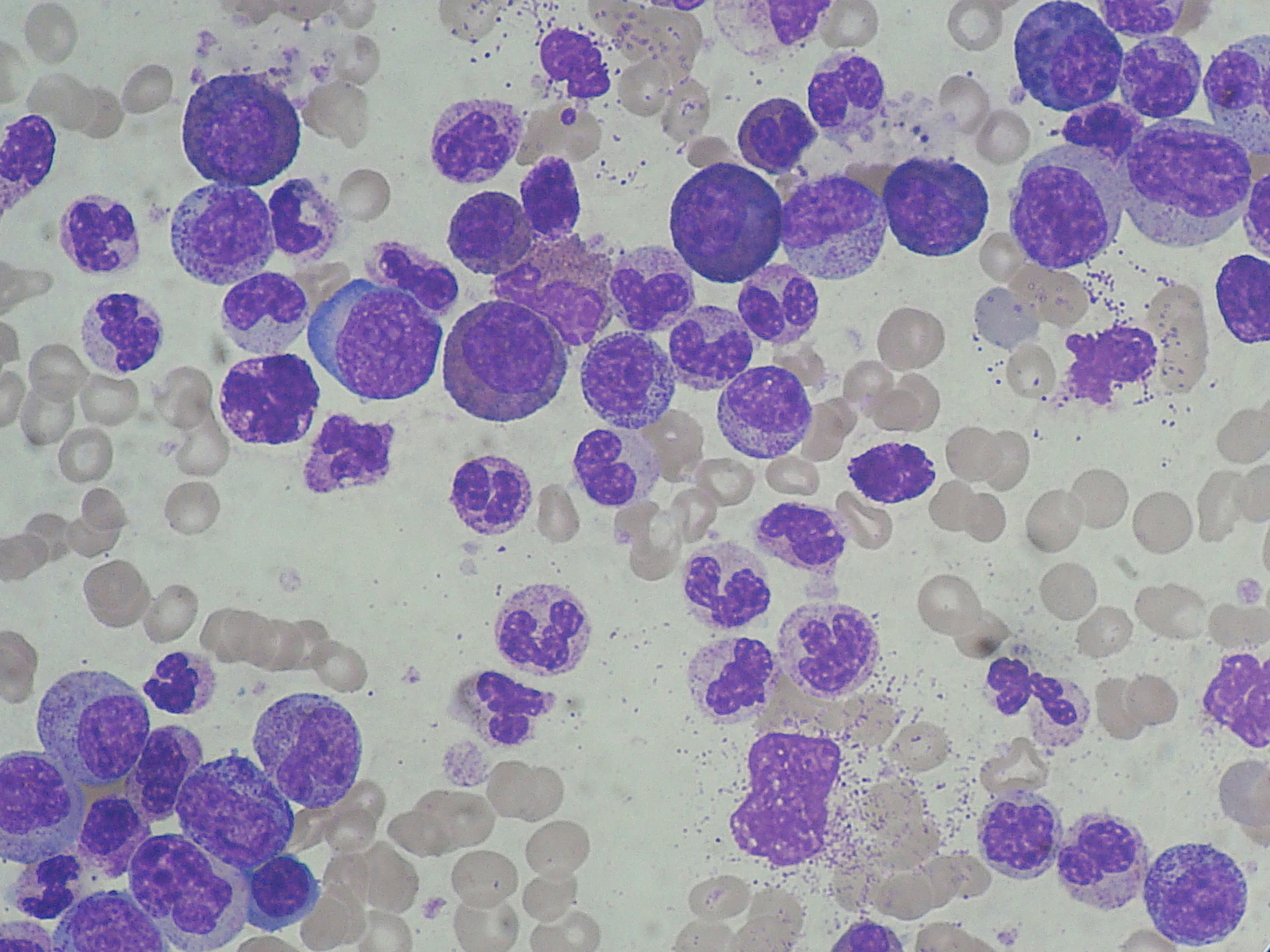
Blood film from a person with chronic myeloid leukaemia: many immature and abnormal white blood cells are visible.

An increased number of band neutrophils—young neutrophils that lack segmented nuclei—or immature granulocytes is termed left shift and occurs in sepsis and some blood disorders, but is normal in pregnancy. An elevated lymphocyte count (lymphocytosis) is associated with viral infection and lymphoproliferative disorders like chronic lymphocytic leukaemia; elevated monocyte counts (monocytosis) are associated with chronic inflammatory states; and the eosinophil count is often increased (eosinophilia) in parasitic infections and allergic conditions. An increased number of basophils, termed basophilia, can occur in myeloproliferative disorders like chronic myeloid leukaemia and polycythemia vera. The presence of some types of abnormal cells, such as blast cells or lymphocytes with neoplastic features, is suggestive of a hematologic malignancy.

=== Platelets ===
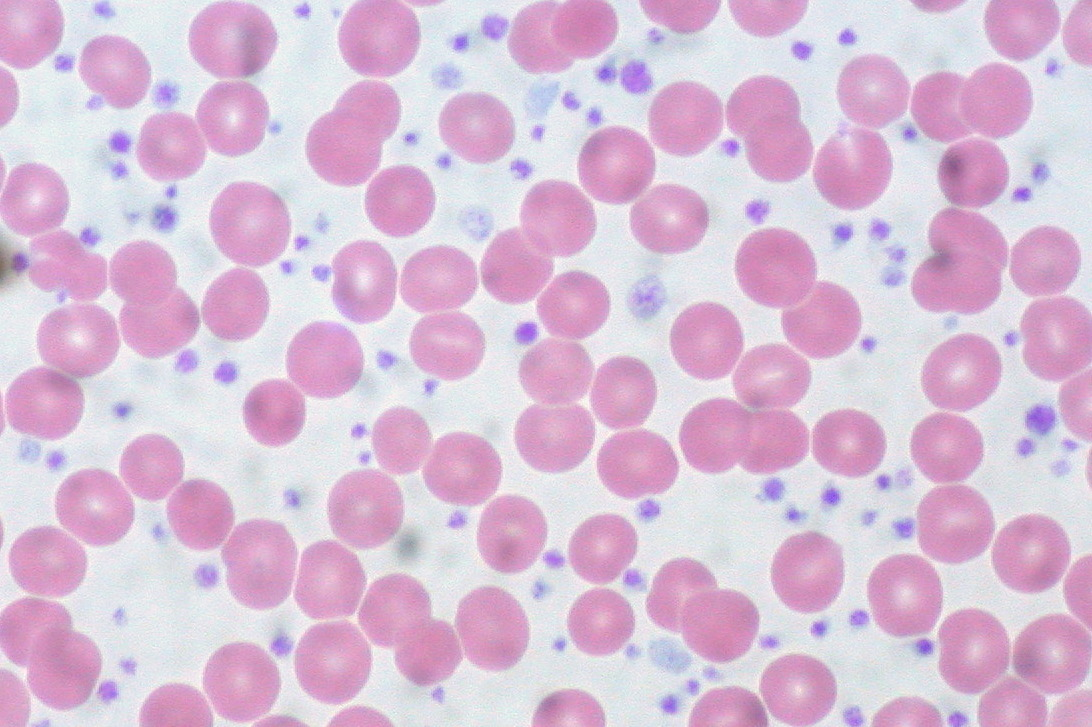
Blood film of essential thrombocythemia. Platelets are visible as small purple structures.

Platelets play an essential role in clotting. When the wall of a blood vessel is damaged, platelets adhere to the exposed surface at the site of injury and plug the gap. Simultaneous activation of the coagulation cascade results in the formation of fibrin, which reinforces the platelet plug to create a stable clot. A low platelet count, known as thrombocytopenia, may cause bleeding if severe. It can occur in individuals who are undergoing treatments that suppress the bone marrow, such as chemotherapy or radiation therapy, or taking certain drugs, such as heparin, that can induce the immune system to destroy platelets. Thrombocytopenia is a feature of many blood disorders, like acute leukaemia and aplastic anemia, as well as some autoimmune diseases. If the platelet count is extremely low, a platelet transfusion may be performed. Thrombocytosis, meaning a high platelet count, may occur in states of inflammation or trauma, as well as in iron deficiency, and the platelet count may reach exceptionally high levels in people with essential thrombocythemia, a rare blood disease. The platelet count can be reported in units of cells per microlitre of blood (/μL), 10^{3} cells per microlitre (× 10^{3}/μL), or 10^{9} cells per litre (× 10^{9}/L).

The mean platelet volume (MPV) measures the average size of platelets in femtolitres. It can aid in determining the cause of thrombocytopenia; an elevated MPV may occur when young platelets are released into the bloodstream to compensate for increased destruction of platelets, while decreased production of platelets due to dysfunction of the bone marrow can result in a low MPV. The MPV is also useful for differentiating between congenital diseases that cause thrombocytopenia. The immature platelet fraction (IPF) or reticulated platelet count is reported by some analyzers and provides information about the rate of platelet production by measuring the number of immature platelets in the blood.

=== Other tests ===
==== Reticulocyte count ====
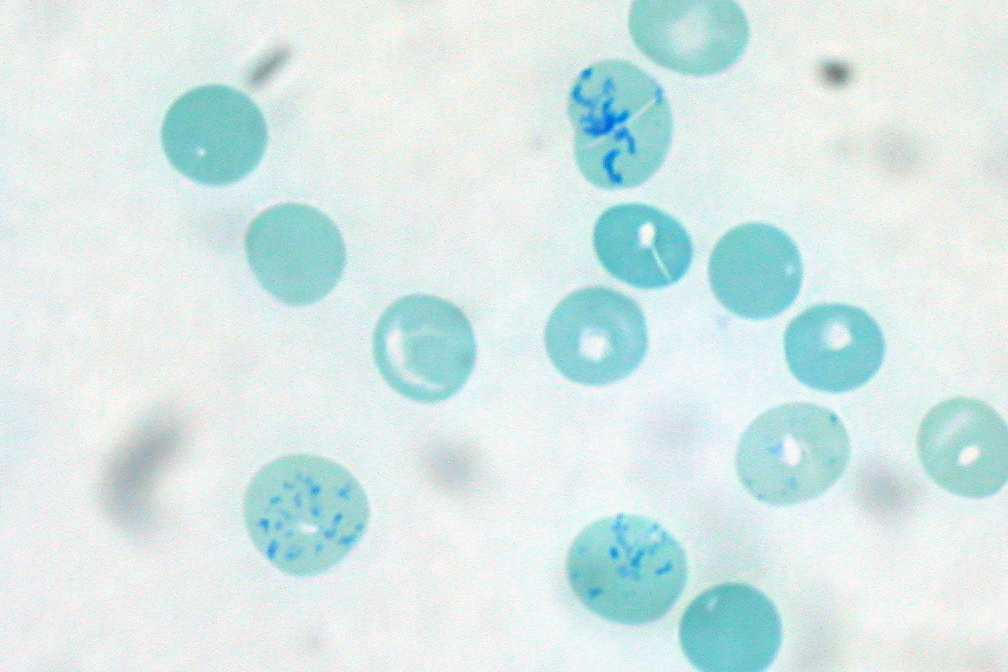
Red blood cells stained with new methylene blue: the cells containing dark blue structures are reticulocytes.

Reticulocytes are immature red blood cells, which, unlike the mature cells, contain RNA. A reticulocyte count is sometimes performed as part of a complete blood count, usually to investigate the cause of a person's anemia or evaluate their response to treatment. Anemia with a high reticulocyte count can indicate that the bone marrow is producing red blood cells at a higher rate to compensate for blood loss or hemolysis, while anemia with a low reticulocyte count may suggest that the person has a condition that reduces the body's ability to produce red blood cells. When people with nutritional anemia are given nutrient supplementation, an increase in the reticulocyte count indicates that their body is responding to the treatment by producing more red blood cells. Hematology analyzers perform reticulocyte counts by staining red blood cells with a dye that binds to RNA and measuring the number of reticulocytes through light scattering or fluorescence analysis. The test can be performed manually by staining the blood with new methylene blue and counting the percentage of red blood cells containing RNA under the microscope. The reticulocyte count is expressed as an absolute number or as a percentage of red blood cells.

Some instruments measure the average amount of hemoglobin in each reticulocyte; a parameter that has been studied as an indicator of iron deficiency in people who have conditions that interfere with standard tests. The immature reticulocyte fraction (IRF) is another measurement produced by some analyzers which quantifies the maturity of reticulocytes: cells that are less mature contain more RNA and thus produce a stronger fluorescent signal. This information can be useful in diagnosing anemias and evaluating red blood cell production following anemia treatment or bone marrow transplantation.

==== Nucleated red blood cells ====
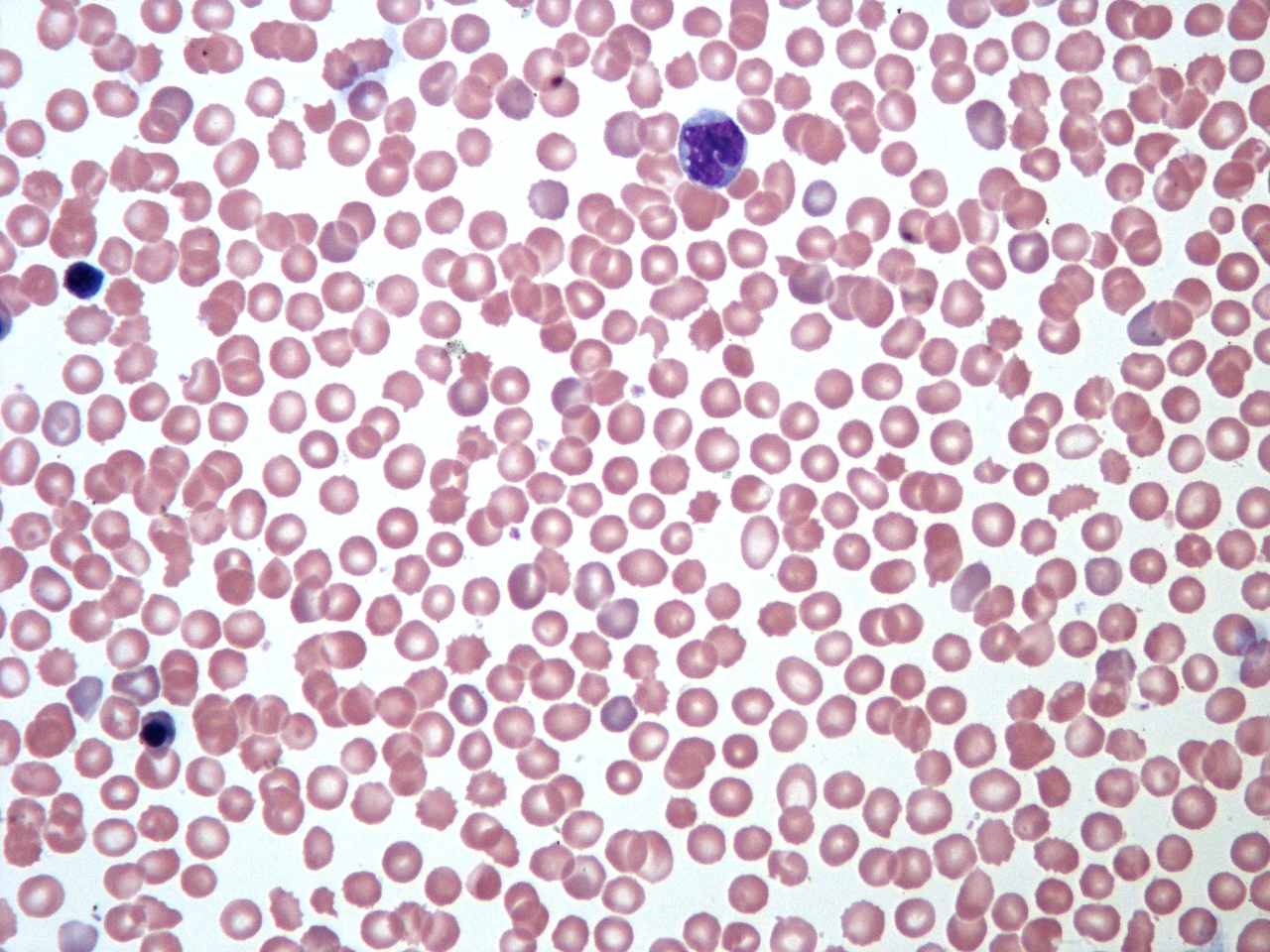
Blood smear from a newborn baby, showing a few nucleated red cells

During their formation in bone marrow, and in the liver and spleen in fetuses, red blood cells contain a cell nucleus, which is usually absent in the mature cells that circulate in the bloodstream. Nucleated red blood cells are normal in newborn babies, but when detected in children and adults, they indicate an increased demand for red blood cells, which can be caused by bleeding, some cancers and anemia. Most analyzers can detect these cells as part of the differential cell count. High numbers of nucleated red cells can cause a falsely high white cell count, which will require adjusting.

==== Other parameters ====
Advanced hematology analyzers generate novel measurements of blood cells which have shown diagnostic significance in research studies but have not yet found widespread clinical use. For example, some types of analyzers produce coordinate readings indicating the size and position of each white blood cell cluster. These parameters (termed cell population data) have been studied as potential markers for blood disorders, bacterial infections and malaria. Analyzers that use myeloperoxidase staining to produce differential counts can measure white blood cells' expression of the enzyme, which is altered in various disorders. Some instruments can report the percentage of red blood cells that are hypochromic in addition to reporting the average MCHC value, or provide a count of fragmented red cells (schistocytes), which occur in some types of hemolytic anemia. Because these parameters are often specific to particular brands of analyzers, it is difficult for laboratories to interpret and compare results.

== Reference ranges ==
Example of reference ranges for complete blood count with differential (CBC w DIFF)
Test	Units	Adult	Paediatric (4–7 years old)	Neonate (0–1 days old)
WBC	× 10^{9}/L	3.6–10.6	5.0–17.0	9.0–37.0
RBC	× 10^{12}/L	M: 4.20–6.00; F: 3.80–5.20	4.00–5.20	4.10–6.10
HGB	g/L	M: 135–180; F: 120–150	102–152	165–215
HCT	L/L	M: 0.40–0.54; F: 0.35–0.49	0.36–0.46	0.48–0.68
MCV	fL	80–100	78–94	95–125
MCH	pg	26–34	23–31	30–42
MCHC	g/L	320–360	320–360	300–340
RDW	%	11.5–14.5	11.5–14.5	elevated (Note: The RDW is highly elevated at birth and gradually decreases until approximately six months of age.)
PLT	× 10^{9}/L	150–450	150–450	150–450
Neutrophils	× 10^{9}/L	1.7–7.5	1.5–11.0	3.7–30.0
Lymphocytes	× 10^{9}/L	1.0–3.2	1.5–11.1	1.6–14.1
Monocytes	× 10^{9}/L	0.1–1.3	0.1–1.9	0.1–4.4
Eosinophils	× 10^{9}/L	0.0–0.3	0.0–0.7	0.0–1.5
Basophils	× 10^{9}/L	0.0–0.2	0.0–0.3	0.0–0.7

The complete blood count is interpreted by comparing the output to reference ranges, which represent the results found in 95% of apparently healthy people. Based on a statistical normal distribution, the tested samples' ranges vary with sex and age.

On average, adult females have lower hemoglobin, hematocrit, and red blood cell count values than males; the difference lessens, but is still present, after menopause. CBC results for children and newborn babies differ from those of adults. Newborns' hemoglobin, hematocrit, and red blood cell count are extremely high to compensate for low oxygen levels in the womb and the high proportion of fetal hemoglobin, which is less effective at delivering oxygen to tissues than mature forms of hemoglobin, inside their red blood cells. The MCV is also increased, and the white blood cell count is elevated with a preponderance of neutrophils. The red blood cell count and related values begin to decline shortly after birth, reaching their lowest point at about two months of age and increasing thereafter. The red blood cells of older infants and children are smaller, with a lower MCH, than those of adults. In the paediatric white blood cell differential, lymphocytes often outnumber neutrophils, while in adults neutrophils predominate.

Other differences between populations may affect the reference ranges: for example, people living at higher altitudes have higher hemoglobin, hematocrit, and RBC results, and people of African heritage have lower white blood cell counts on average. The type of analyzer used to run the CBC affects the reference ranges as well. Reference ranges are therefore established by individual laboratories based on their own patient populations and equipment.

== Limitations ==
Some medical conditions or problems with the blood sample may produce inaccurate results. If the sample is visibly clotted, which can be caused by poor phlebotomy technique, it is unsuitable for testing, because the platelet count will be falsely decreased and other results may be abnormal. Samples stored at room temperature for several hours may give falsely high readings for MCV (mean corpuscular volume), because red blood cells swell as they absorb water from the plasma; and platelet and white blood cell differential results may be inaccurate in aged specimens, as the cells degrade over time.

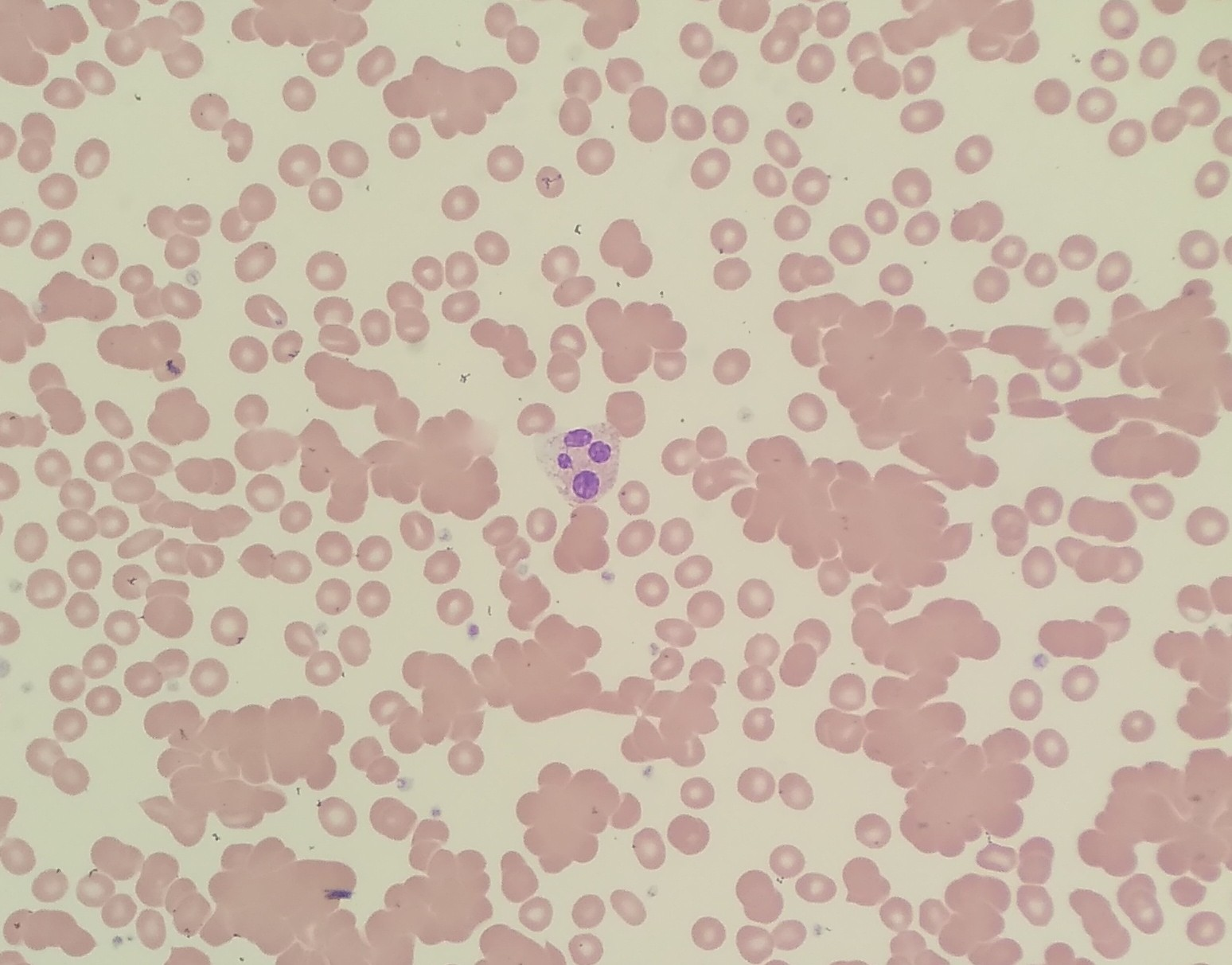
Red blood cell agglutination: clumps of red blood cells are visible on the blood smear

Samples drawn from individuals with very high levels of bilirubin or lipids in their plasma (referred to as an icteric sample or a lipemic sample, respectively) may show falsely high readings for hemoglobin, because these substances change the colour and opacity of the sample, which interferes with hemoglobin measurement. This effect can be mitigated by replacing the plasma with saline.

Some individuals produce an antibody that causes their platelets to form clumps when their blood is drawn into tubes containing EDTA, the anticoagulant typically used to collect CBC samples. Platelet clumps may be counted as single platelets by automated analyzers, leading to a falsely decreased platelet count. This can be avoided by using an alternative anticoagulant such as sodium citrate or heparin.

Another antibody-mediated condition that can affect complete blood count results is red blood cell agglutination. This phenomenon causes red blood cells to clump together because of antibodies bound to the cell surface. Red blood cell aggregates are counted as single cells by the analyzer, leading to a markedly decreased red blood cell count and hematocrit, and markedly elevated MCV and MCHC (mean corpuscular hemoglobin concentration). Often, these antibodies are only active at room temperature (in which case they are called cold agglutinins), and the agglutination can be reversed by heating the sample to 37 °C (99 °F). Samples from people with warm autoimmune hemolytic anemia may exhibit red cell agglutination that does not resolve on warming.

While blast and lymphoma cells can be identified in the manual differential, microscopic examination cannot reliably determine the cells' hematopoietic lineage. This information is often necessary for diagnosing blood cancers. After abnormal cells are identified, additional techniques such as immunophenotyping by flow cytometry can be used to identify markers that provide additional information about the cells.

== History ==
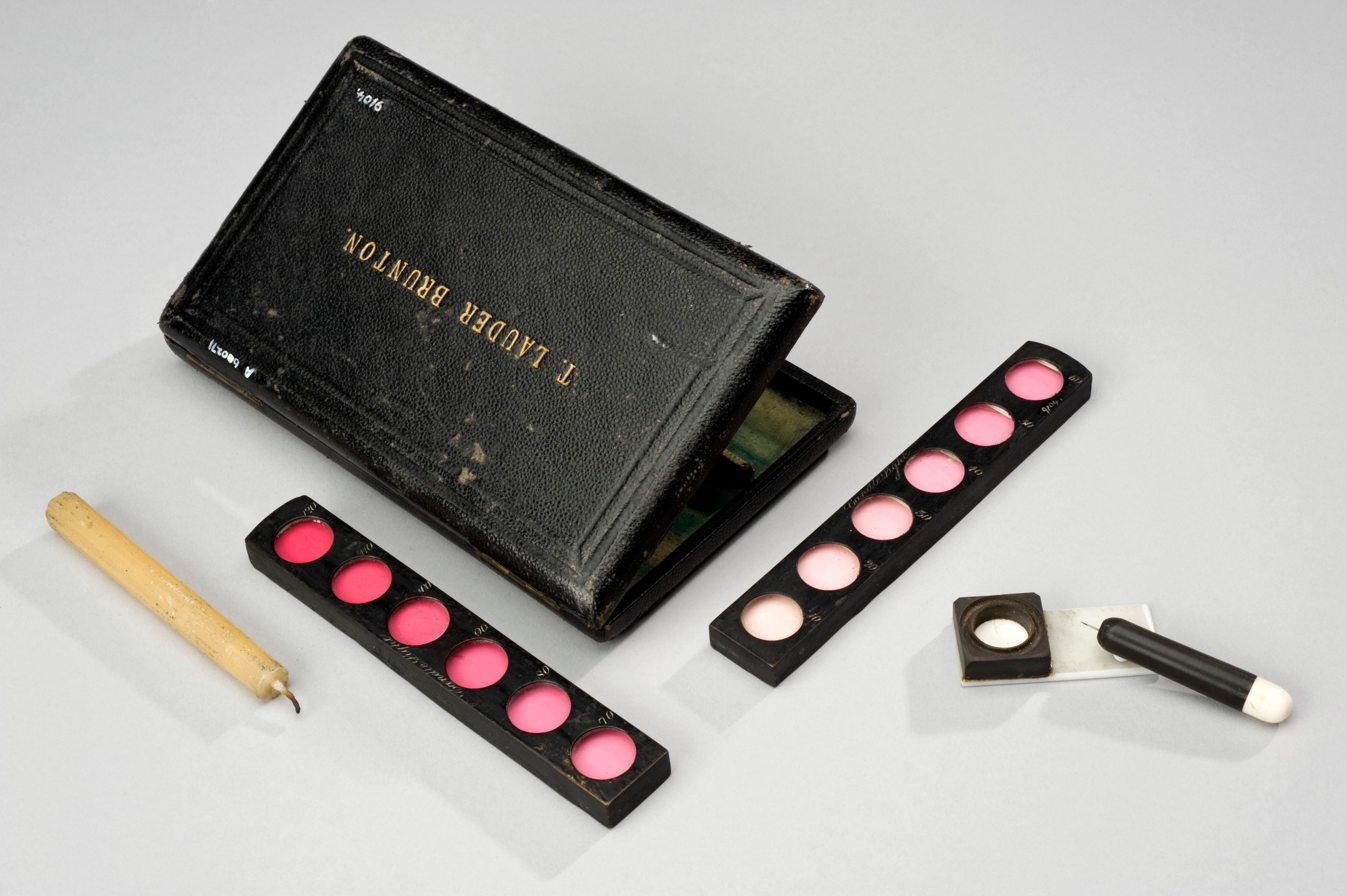
An early hemoglobinometer: blood samples were compared to a colour chart of reference standards to determine the hemoglobin level.

Before automated cell counters were introduced, complete blood count tests were performed manually: white and red blood cells and platelets were counted using microscopes. The first person to publish microscopic observations of blood cells was Antonie van Leeuwenhoek, who reported on the appearance of red cells in a 1674 letter to the Proceedings of the Royal Society of London. Jan Swammerdam had described red blood cells some years earlier, but did not publish his findings at the time. Throughout the 18th and 19th centuries, improvements in microscope technology such as achromatic lenses allowed white blood cells and platelets to be counted in unstained samples.

The physiologist Karl Vierordt is credited with performing the first blood count. His technique, published in 1852, involved aspirating a carefully measured volume of blood into a capillary tube and spreading it onto a microscope slide coated with egg white. After the blood dried, he counted every cell on the slide; this process could take more than three hours to complete. The hemocytometer, introduced in 1874 by Louis-Charles Malassez, simplified the microscopic counting of blood cells. Malassez's hemocytometer consisted of a microscope slide containing a flattened capillary tube. Diluted blood was introduced to the capillary chamber by means of a rubber tube attached to one end, and an eyepiece with a scaled grid was attached to the microscope, permitting the microscopist to count the number of cells per volume of blood. In 1877, William Gowers invented a hemocytometer with a built-in counting grid, eliminating the need to produce specially calibrated eyepieces for each microscope.

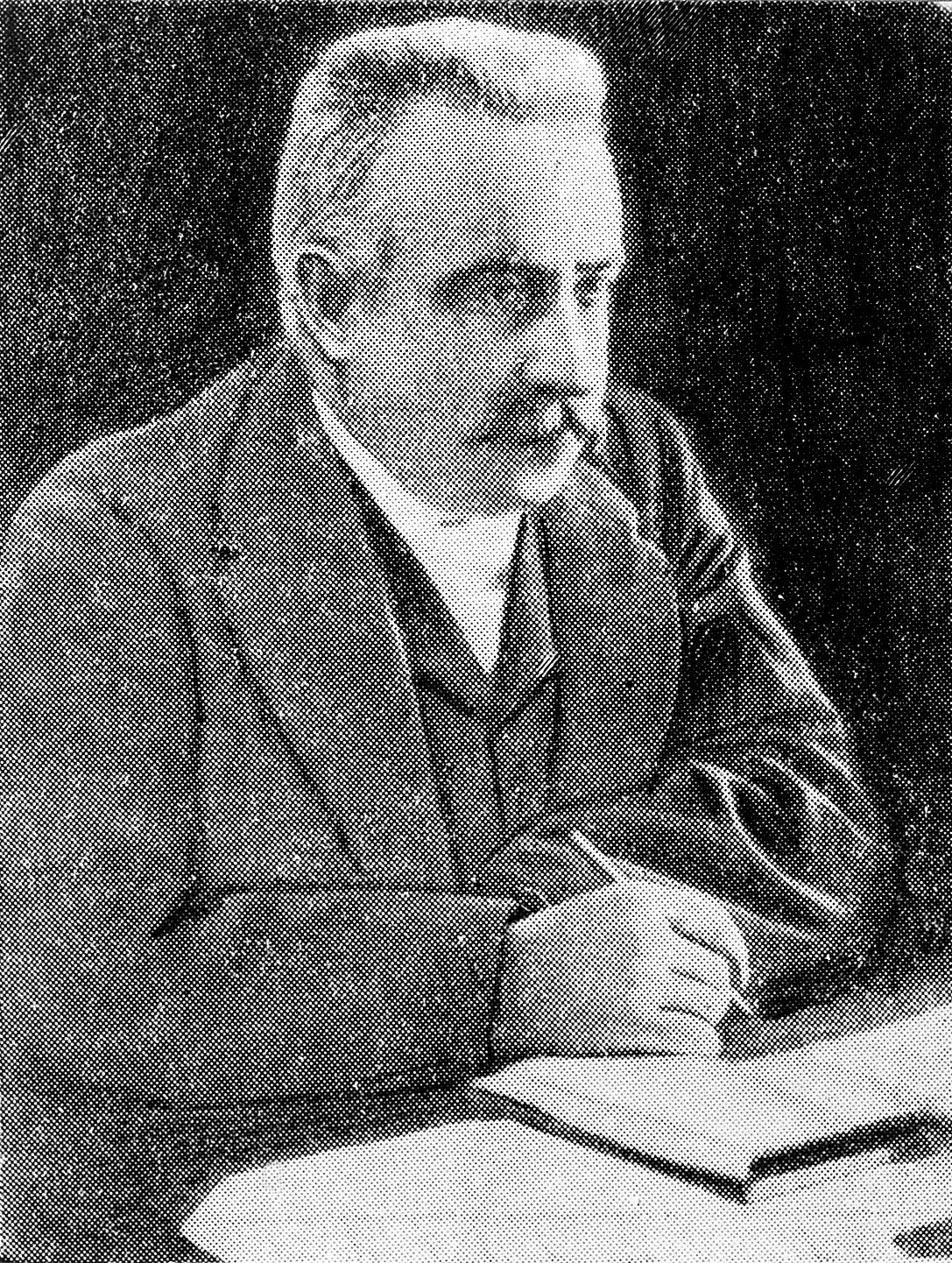
Dmitri Leonidovich Romanowsky invented Romanowsky staining.

In the 1870s, Paul Ehrlich developed a staining technique using a combination of an acidic and basic dye that could distinguish different types of white blood cells and allow red blood cell morphology to be examined. Dmitri Leonidovich Romanowsky improved on this technique in the 1890s, using a mixture of eosin and aged methylene blue to produce a wide range of hues not present when either of the stains was used alone. This became the basis for Romanowsky staining, the technique still used to stain blood smears for manual review.

The first techniques for measuring hemoglobin were devised in the late 19th century, and involved visual comparisons of the colour of diluted blood against a known standard. Attempts to automate this process using spectrophotometry and colorimetry were limited by the fact that hemoglobin is present in the blood in many different forms, meaning that it could not be measured at a single wavelength. In 1920, a method to convert the different forms of hemoglobin to one stable form (cyanmethemoglobin or hemiglobincyanide) was introduced, allowing hemoglobin levels to be measured automatically. The cyanmethemoglobin method remains the reference method for hemoglobin measurement and is still used in many automated hematology analyzers.

Maxwell Wintrobe is credited with the invention of the hematocrit test. In 1929, he undertook a PhD project at the University of Tulane to determine normal ranges for red blood cell parameters, and invented a method known as the Wintrobe hematocrit. Hematocrit measurements had previously been described in the literature, but Wintrobe's method differed in that it used a large tube that could be mass-produced to precise specifications, with a built-in scale. The fraction of red blood cells in the tube was measured after centrifugation to determine the hematocrit. The invention of a reproducible method for determining hematocrit values allowed Wintrobe to define the red blood cell indices.

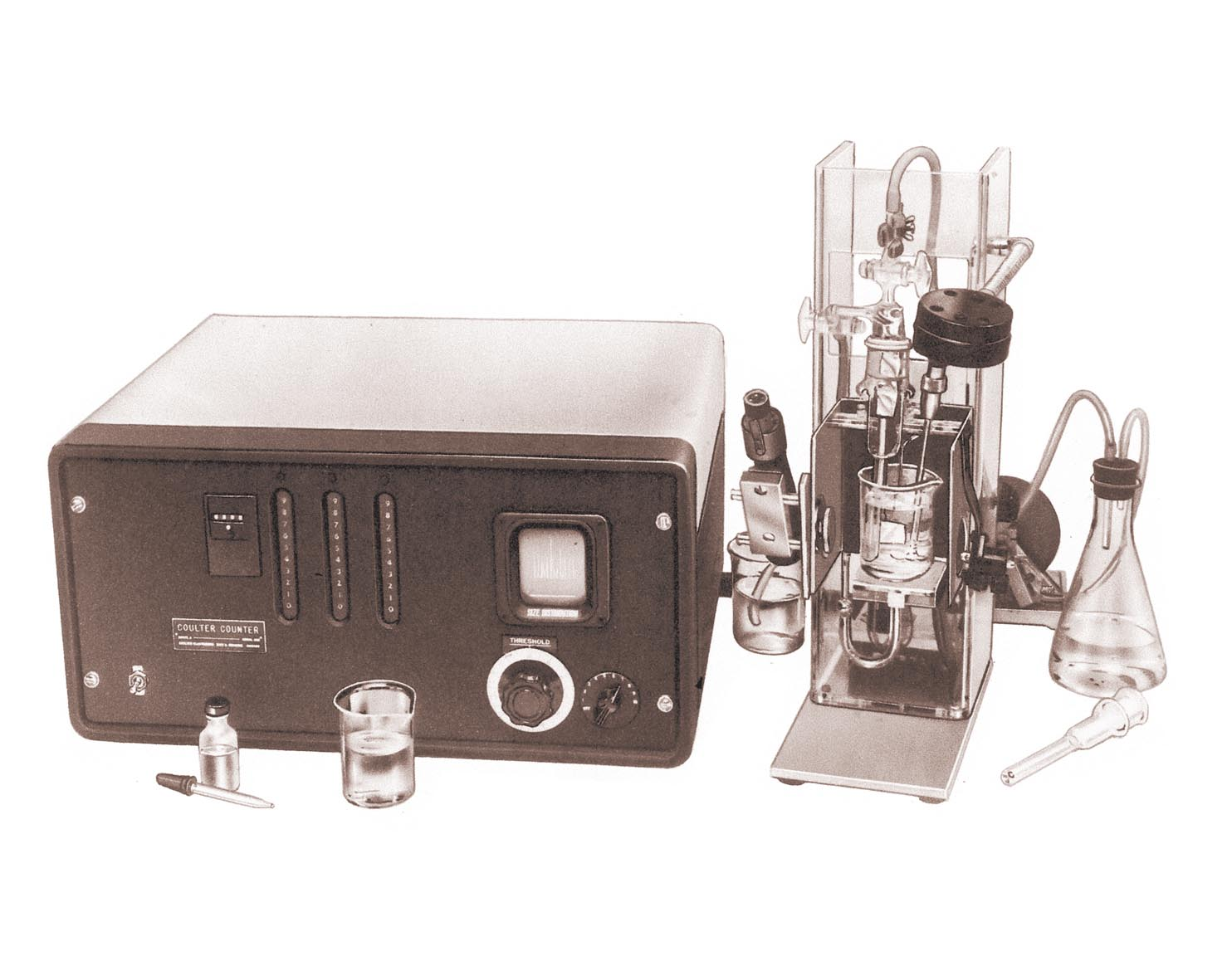
Model A Coulter counter

Research into automated cell counting began in the early 20th century. A method developed in 1928 used the amount of light transmitted through a diluted blood sample, as measured by photometry, to estimate the red blood cell count, but this proved inaccurate for samples with abnormal red blood cells. Other unsuccessful attempts, in the 1930s and 1940s, involved photoelectric detectors attached to microscopes, which would count cells as they were scanned. In the late 1940s, Wallace H. Coulter, motivated by a need for better red blood cell counting methods following the bombing of Hiroshima and Nagasaki, attempted to improve on photoelectric cell counting techniques. (Note: An apocryphal story holds that Wallace invented the Coulter counter to study particles in paints used on US Navy ships; other accounts claim it was originally designed during the Second World War to count plankton. However, Wallace never worked for the Navy, and his earliest writings on the device state that it was first used to analyze blood. The paint story was eventually retracted from documents produced by the Wallace H. Coulter Foundation.) His research was aided by his brother, Joseph R. Coulter, in a basement laboratory in Chicago. Their results using photoelectric methods were disappointing, and in 1948, after reading a paper relating the conductivity of blood to its red blood cell concentration, Wallace devised the Coulter principle—the theory that a cell suspended in a conductive medium generates a drop in current proportional to its size as it passes through an aperture.

That October, Wallace built a counter to demonstrate the principle. Owing to financial constraints, the aperture was made by burning a hole through a piece of cellophane from a cigarette package. Wallace filed a patent for the technique in 1949, and in 1951 applied to the Office of Naval Research to fund the development of the Coulter counter. Wallace's patent application was granted in 1953, and after improvements to the aperture and the introduction of a mercury manometer to provide precise control over sample size, the brothers founded Coulter Electronics Inc. in 1958 to market their instruments. The Coulter counter was initially designed for counting red blood cells, but with later modifications it proved effective for counting white blood cells. Coulter counters were widely adopted by medical laboratories.

The first analyzer able to produce multiple cell counts simultaneously was the Technicon SMA 4A−7A, released in 1965. It achieved this by partitioning blood samples into two channels: one for counting red and white blood cells and one for measuring hemoglobin. However, the instrument was unreliable and difficult to maintain. In 1968, the Coulter Model S analyzer was released and gained widespread use. Similarly to the Technicon instrument, it used two different reaction chambers, one of which was used for the red cell count, and one of which was used for the white blood cell count and hemoglobin determination. The Model S also determined the mean cell volume using impedance measurements, which allowed the red blood cell indices and hematocrit to be derived. Automated platelet counts were introduced in 1970 with Technicon's Hemalog-8 instrument and were adopted by Coulter's S Plus series analyzers in 1980.

After basic cell counting had been automated, the white blood cell differential remained a challenge. Throughout the 1970s, researchers explored two methods for automating the differential count: digital image processing and flow cytometry. Using technology developed in the 1950s and 60s to automate the reading of Pap smears, several models of image processing analyzers were produced. These instruments would scan a stained blood smear to find cell nuclei, then take a higher resolution snapshot of the cell to analyze it through densitometry. They were expensive, slow, and did little to reduce workload in the laboratory because they still required blood smears to be prepared and stained, so flow cytometry-based systems became more popular, and by 1990, no digital image analyzers were commercially available in the United States or western Europe. These techniques enjoyed a resurgence in the 2000s with the introduction of more advanced image analysis platforms using artificial neural networks.

Early flow cytometry devices shot beams of light at cells in specific wavelengths and measured the resulting absorbance, fluorescence or light scatter, collecting information about the cells' features and allowing cellular contents such as DNA to be quantified. One such instrument—the Rapid Cell Spectrophotometer, developed by Louis Kamentsky in 1965 to automate cervical cytology—could generate blood cell scattergrams using cytochemical staining techniques. Leonard Ornstein, who had helped to develop the staining system on the Rapid Cell Spectrophotometer, and his colleagues later created the first commercial flow cytometric white blood cell differential analyzer, the Hemalog D. Introduced in 1974, this analyzer used light scattering, absorbance and cell staining to identify the five normal white blood cell types in addition to "large unidentified cells", a classification that usually consisted of atypical lymphocytes or blast cells. The Hemalog D could count 10,000 cells in one run, a marked improvement over the manual differential. In 1981, Technicon combined the Hemalog D with the Hemalog-8 analyzer to produce the Technicon H6000, the first combined complete blood count and differential analyzer. This analyzer was unpopular with hematology laboratories because it was labour-intensive to operate, but in the late 1980s to early 1990s similar systems were widely produced by other manufacturers such as Sysmex, Abbott, Roche and Beckman Coulter.
