= Maxwell Wintrobe =

American physician (1901–1986)

- Born: 27 October 1901; Austria, Austria-Hungary
- Died: 9 December 1986 (aged 85)
- Occupation: Physician
- Known for: Wintrobe hematocrit method, introduced in 1929

Maxwell Myer Wintrobe (October 27, 1901 – December 9, 1986) was an Austrian-born American physician who was a 20th-century authority in the medical field of hematology and one of the pioneers of chemotherapy. His 1942 textbook on hematology, Clinical Hematology, was the first dedicated work in the field and he contributed to the diagnostic approach of anemia and copper metabolism, amongst many other achievements.

== Biography ==
Wintrobe was born in Austria (Fred 2007), contrary to previous historical records. His family name reflects the Jewish origin of his parents, Herman and Ethel, who emigrated from Austria with their son Max in 1906. Canadian census records show that the family arrived in Halifax, Nova Scotia in 1906, where Ethel's four brothers were living at the time. The family moved to Manitoba in 1912. Wintrobe attended the University of Manitoba from the early age of 15, where he graduated in 1921 and obtained his M.D. in 1926. He married Becky Zamphir, and moved to the United States, where he obtained a PhD at Tulane University in New Orleans, Louisiana in 1929; his thesis was titled "The Erythrocyte in Man".

Initially working in Johns Hopkins Hospital, where he served on the faculty, he was appointed as professor of internal medicine at the College of Medicine of the University of Utah in 1943; he also served as the first Chairman of the Department of Medicine and physician-in-chief for the Salt Lake County General Hospital.

In Salt Lake City he led research in hereditary and metabolic disorders (1945–1973) and cardiovascular research (1969–1973). He retired officially in 1965, but remained in function until 1973 (Valentine 1990). In that year he was elected to the National Academy of Sciences.

== Works ==
In New Orleans, Wintrobe pioneered new ways of measuring the hematocrit, including what are now known as Wintrobe indices: mean cell volume, mean cell hemoglobin, and mean cell hemoglobin concentration, all quantitative measures of the red blood cell population (Wintrobe 1932). Much of this work continued in Hopkins and Utah, where he also worked on pernicious anemia, copper metabolism and Wilson's disease, sickle-cell disease and other anemias.

Wintrobe was the principal editor of Clinical Hematology, which first appeared in 1942 and is in its eleventh edition (Greer et al. as of 2003), still bearing his name. He was part of the team that pioneered the use of chemotherapy in cancer (Goodman et al. 1946). He was one of the editors of the first edition (1950) of Harrison's Principles of Internal Medicine.

In 1980, he published Blood, pure and eloquent, and in 1985 he published Hematology, the Blossoming of a Science. Both works are historical overviews of his field.
