= Macrocytic anemia =

- Specialty: Hematology

Macrocytic anemia is a condition and blood disorder characterized by the presence of predominantly larger-than-normal erythrocytes (red blood cells, or RBCs) accompanied by low numbers of RBC, which often carry an insufficient amount of hemoglobin. Due to the smaller ratio between the cell's surface area and its volume, the capacity of erythrocytes to properly carry and transport hemoglobin is diminished. This results in an insufficient availability of hemoglobin, hence the label of anemia.

The term macrocytosis refers to the expansion of the mean corpuscular volume of red blood cells. It has several possible causes, all of which produce slightly different red blood cell morphology. Detection methods include a complete blood count (CBC) and peripheral blood smears.

Neutrophils (white blood cells) also differ in their morphology in the megaloblastic variety of macrocytic anemia. A hypersegmentation of neutrophils refers to instances where there are six or more lobes present, resulting in a hypersegmented nucleus. This is a direct result of impaired DNA synthesis in the hematopoietic cells. In contrast, non-megaloblastic macrocytic anemia does not exhibit problematic DNA synthesis.

Possible causes include folic acid and/or Vitamin B_{12} deficiencies, liver disease (including but not limited to results from chronic alcohol abuse), medications interfering with DNA synthesis (such as certain immunosuppressants like methotrexate and azathioprine), bone marrow disease, pregnancy, as well as autoimmune and endocrine conditions.

Treatment depends on severity and the underlying cause.

== Presentation ==
Due to the difference in the affected molecules, macrocytic anemia will vary in accordance with its underlying cause, with cases being divided into megaloblastic (megaloblastosis) and non-megaloblastic.

Megaloblastic anemia stemming from a Vitamin B_{12} and/or folic acid deficiency will present with neurological symptoms, as this deficiency has a detrimental effect on the production of the myelin sheaths of neurons and DNA synthesis. Some examples include impaired proprioception, paresthesia, loss of balance, poor memory, and peripheral neuropathy. In severe cases, it has the potential to lead to dementia.

Non-megaloblastic anemia, meanwhile, exhibits a greater range of versitility, due to its occurring from multiple mechanisms. It mirrors a lot of standard anemia presentation in its hypoxemia-related symptoms: dizziness or fainting, fatigue, pale skin, shortness of breath, and fast or irregular heartbeat. Two especially noteworthy physical symptoms of anemia are glossitis, the reddening of the tongue, and fingernails with a concave, "spoon-like" shape. Additional symptoms from the underlying cause will manifest; liver dysfunction and/or chronic alcohol abuse may present with yellowing of the skin and/or sclera, abdominal discomfort, tremors, or skin itching; underlying hypothyroidism may present with weight gain, cold intolerance, dry skin and goiter. If the root cause is a myelodysplastic, recurring infection, easy bleeding/bruising, and flat, pinpoint spots under the skin, caused by bleeding, may be observed.

If the root cause relates to specific taken medication, symptoms specific to the drug in question may also present.

== Causes ==
=== Megaloblastic anemias ===
Megaloblastic anemias represent a type of macrocytic anemia characterized by certain morphologic abnormalities noted on a peripheral blood smear examination. These abnormalities include the presence of enlarged oval shaped red blood cells (macroovalocytes) and hypersegmented neutrophils (defined as a neutrophil with six or more lobes). Hypersegmented neutrophils may be seen in the absence of macroovalocytes as hypersegmentation of neutrophils is an early sign of megaloblastic anemia and may precede the appearance of macroovalocytes; they may also be seen in other anemias (e.g., iron deficiency anemia) and thus are suggestive of megaloblastic anemia but not specific for it. An increased red cell distribution width (anisocytosis) also suggests megaloblastosis and is commonly seen in Vitamin B_{12} deficiency and folate deficiency. This type of anemia is caused by impaired DNA synthesis and repair, often from deficient thymidine production. Thiamine responsive megaloblastic anemia syndrome also causes megaloblastic anemia.

The red blood cells grow larger because they cannot produce DNA quickly enough to divide at the right time, thus growing too large before division. Additional causes of megaloblastic anemia include medications that interfere with DNA synthesis or with the absorption or metabolism of Vitamin B_{12} or folate such as methotrexate, sulfasalazine, metformin, anticonvulsant medications (e.g., valproic acid or phenytoin), certain antibiotics (e.g., trimethoprim/sulfamethoxazole), antiretroviral medications, cholestyramine, triamterene, and nitrous oxide.

=== Non-Megaloblastic anemias ===
==== Red cell membrane disorders producing codocytes ====
Other disorders which cause macrocytosis without DNA replication problems (i.e., non-megaloblastic macrocytic anemias), are disorders associated with increased red cell membrane surface area, such as pathologies of the liver and spleen which produce codocytes or "target cells" which have a central collection of hemoglobin surrounded by a pallor (a thin area) then followed by a thicker collection of hemoglobin at the rim of the cell.

==== Alcohol ====
Round macrocytes which are not codocytes are produced in chronic alcoholism (which produces a mild macrocytosis even in the absence of vitamin deficiency), apparently as a direct toxic effect of alcohol specifically on the bone marrow. Excessive alcohol consumption is one of the most common causes of macrocytosis and non-megaloblastic macrocytic anemia.

==== Association with rapid red cell turnover and reticulocytosis ====
Mild macrocytosis is a common finding associated with rapid blood restoration or production, since in general, "fresh" or newly produced red cells (reticulocytes) are larger than the mean (average) size, due to slow shrinkage of normal cells over a normal red cell circulating lifetime. Thus, chronic obstructive pulmonary disease (COPD), in which red cells are rapidly produced in response to low oxygen levels in the blood, often produces mild macrocytosis. The macrocytosis associated with COPD is also attributed to excess cell water secondary to carbon dioxide retention. Also, rapid blood replacement from the marrow after a traumatic blood loss, or rapid red blood cell turnover from rapid hemolysis (G6PD deficiency), also often produces mild macrocytosis in the associated anemia.

== Diagnosis ==
Several tests can help to elucidate the underlying cause of a person's macrocytic anemia. A peripheral blood smear is often recommended as a first step in the evaluation to determine if the macrocytic anemia has megaloblastic features since the causes of megaloblastic and non-megaloblastic macrocytic anemia differ and making this distinction can narrow the list of differential diagnoses.For non-megaloblastic macrocytic anemias, a reticulocyte count may be helpful. Non-megaloblastic macrocytic anemias with a low reticulocyte count (indicating a poor bone marrow response to the anemia) suggest liver disease (e.g., cirrhosis), hypothyroidism, toxic effects of alcohol on the bone marrow, or myelodysplasia. In contrast, non-megaloblastic macrocytic anemias associated with a high reticulocyte count (reticulocytosis) may be caused by hemolysis or bleeding.For megaloblastic macrocytic anemias, useful tests may include serum levels of Vitamin B_{12}, methylmalonic acid, and homocysteine. In the absence of Vitamin B_{12} or folate deficiency, alternative causes of megaloblastic anemia include copper deficiency, medications, and certain inborn errors of metabolism.

== Treatment ==
As with other types of anemia, treatment depends on severity and the underlying cause.

== Epidemiology ==
Macrocytic anemias have several causes but with the implementation of folic acid fortification in North America, folate deficiency has become a rare cause of megaloblastic macrocytic anemia in that part of the world. In this region, Vitamin B_{12} deficiency is a far more common cause of megaloblastic macrocytic anemia. In countries that have not put such practices into place — including most European nations — folate deficiency remains a common cause of macrocytic anemia.

== See also ==
- List of circulatory system conditions
