= Price-Jones curve =

Graph showing size of red blood cells

A Price-Jones curve is a graph showing the distribution of diameters of red blood cells. Higher diameter may be seen in pernicious anaemia, while lower diameter may be seen after haemorrhage.

== Medical uses ==
A Price-Jones curve can be used in the diagnosis of anaemia. Price-Jones curves usually vary both by average red blood cell size, and the distribution of sizes.

=== Interpretation of results ===
Higher red blood cell diameter and wider variation in size are often seen in pernicious anaemia. Lower diameter with normal variation in size are often seen after haemorrhage. A higher variation in size is known as anisocytosis.

== Procedure ==
A blood smear can be used to view individual red blood cells. The diameter of each red blood cell can be measured, which is usually analogous to volume. This is usually performed automatically by particle counters. Data is then converted into a histogram. This can be used to assess red blood cell distribution width (RDW).

== History ==
Cecil Price-Jones first proposed using the Price-Jones curve in a 1922 paper. It has been used for assessing red blood cells since then.
