= Red blood cell indices =

Details about red blood cells as part of a standard blood test

- Purpose: information about the hemoglobin content and size of red blood cells

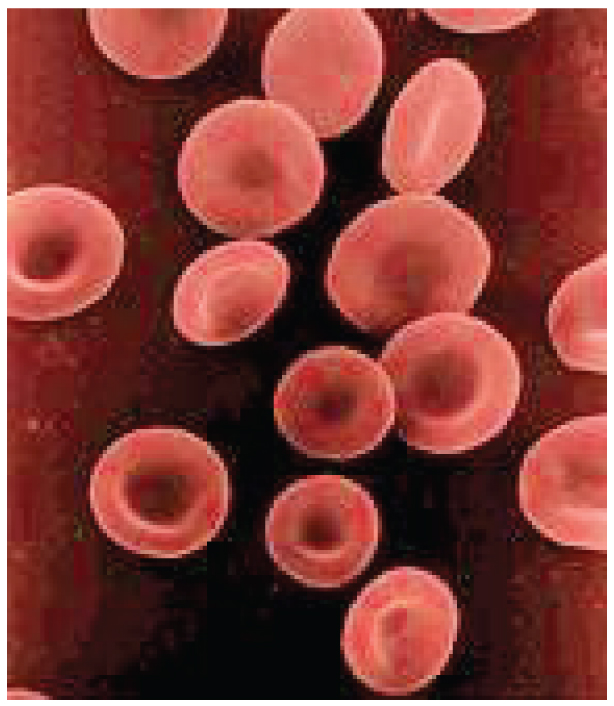

Red blood cell indices are blood tests that provide information about the hemoglobin content and size of red blood cells. Abnormal values indicate the presence of anemia and which type of anemia it is.

== Mean corpuscular volume ==
Mean corpuscular volume (MCV) is the average volume of a red blood cell and is calculated by dividing the hematocrit (Hct) by the concentration of red blood cell count.

- $\textit{MCV} = \frac{\textit{Hct}}{[\textit{RBC}]}$
- Normal range: 80–100 fL (femtoliter)

== Mean corpuscular hemoglobin ==
Mean corpuscular hemoglobin (MCH) is the average amount of hemoglobin (Hb) per red blood cell and is calculated by dividing the hemoglobin by the red blood cell count.

- $MCH = \frac{Hb}{RBC}$
- Normal range: 27-31 pg/cell

== Mean corpuscular hemoglobin concentration ==
Mean corpuscular hemoglobin concentration (MCHC) is the average concentration of hemoglobin per unit volume of red blood cells and is calculated by dividing the hemoglobin by the hematocrit.

- $MCHC = \frac{Hb}{Hct}$
- Normal range: 32-36 g/dL

== Red blood cell distribution width ==
Red blood cell distribution width (RDW or RDW-CV or RCDW and RDW-SD) is a measure of the range of variation of red blood cell (RBC) volume, yielding clues about morphology.

== Erythropoietic precursor indices ==
The reticulocyte production index (RPI) or corrected reticulocyte count (CRC) represents the true significance of the absolute reticulocyte count to provide some reflection of erythropoietic demand and supply. The immature reticulocyte fraction (IRF) goes a step further to cast more light on the same question.

== Worked example ==
Measure	Units	Conventional units	Conversion
Hct	40%		
Hb	100 grams/liter	10 grams/deciliter	(deci- is 10^{−1})
RBC	5E+12 cells/liter	5E+6 cells/μL	(micro is 10^{−6})
MCV = (Hct/100) / RBC	8E-14 liters/cell	80 femtoliters/cell	(femto- is 10^{−15})
MCH = Hb / RBC	2E-11 grams/cell	20 picograms/cell	(pico- is 10^{−12})
MCHC = Hb / (Hct/100)	250 grams/liter	25 grams/deciliter	(deci is 10^{−1})
