= Primary anemia =

Primary anemia may refer to:

- Hyperchromic anemia or chlorosis
- Pernicious anemia
