= Anisopoikilocytosis =

Blood disorder often caused by some type of anemia

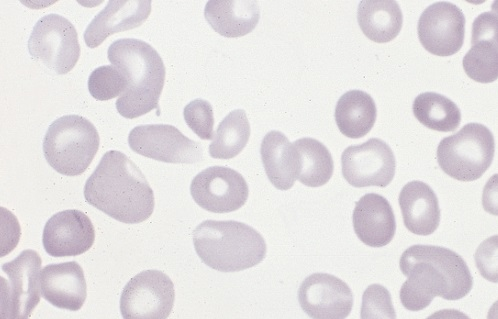
- Slight to moderate anisopoikilocytosis in a case of polycythemia vera
- Specialty: Hematology

Anisopoikilocytosis is a medical condition illustrated by a variance in size (anisocytosis) and shape (poikilocytosis) of a red blood cell. The underlying cause can be attributed to various anemias, most often; beta thalassemia major, a form of microcytic anemia. In β thalassemia major the beta hemoglobin chain is completely absent, rendering an increase in fetal hemoglobin (HbF).
