= Mentzer index =

Blood test result

- Purpose: in differentiating iron deficiency anemia from beta thalassemia

The Mentzer index, described in 1973 by William C. Mentzer, is the MCV divided by the RBC count. It is said to be helpful in differentiating iron deficiency anemia from beta thalassemia trait.

$\text{Mentzer Index} = \frac{\text{MCV (fL)}}{\text{RBC (millions/}\mu L\text{)}}$

The index is calculated from the results of a complete blood count. If the quotient of the mean corpuscular volume (MCV, in fL) divided by the red blood cell count (RBC, in million per microliter) is less than 13, β-thalassemia trait is said to be more likely. If the result is greater than 13, then iron-deficiency anemia is said to be more likely.

The principle involved is as follows: In iron deficiency, the marrow cannot produce as many RBCs and they are small (microcytic), so the RBC count and the MCV will both be low, and as a result, the index will be greater than 13. Conversely, in thalassemia, which is a disorder of globin synthesis, the number of RBCs produced is normal, but the cells are smaller and more fragile. Therefore, the RBC count is normal, but the MCV is low, so the index will be less than 13.
