= Normochromic anemia =

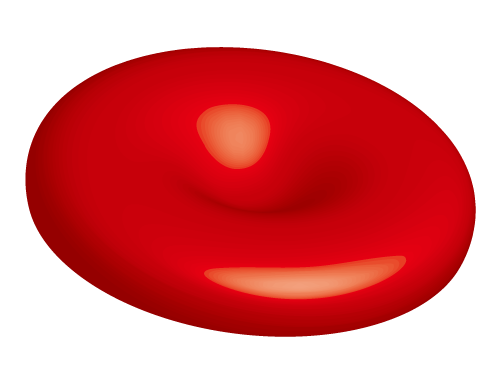
- This condition entails insufficient numbers of red blood cell
- Specialty: Hematology

Normochromic anemia is a form of anemia in which the concentration of hemoglobin in the red blood cells is within the standard range, but there is an insufficient number of red blood cells. Conditions where this is found include aplastic, posthemorrhagic, and hemolytic anemias and anemia of chronic disease.

MCH (average amount of hemoglobin found in the red blood cells in the body) or MCHC (the average weight of that hemoglobin based on the volume of red blood cells) in these cells are normal.

== See also ==
- Normocytic anemia
