= Red blood cell distribution width =

Measure of red blood cell volume variation as part of a standard blood test

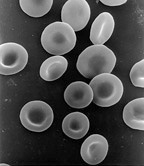
- Human red blood cells
- Synonyms: RCDW
- Purpose: measure of the range of variation of red blood cell volume that is reported as part of a standard complete blood count.

Red blood cell distribution width (RDW), as well as various types thereof (RDW-CV or RCDW and RDW-SD), is a measure of the range of variation of red blood cell (RBC) volume that is reported as part of a standard complete blood count. Red blood cells have an average volume of 80–100 femtoliters, but individual cell volumes vary even in healthy blood. Certain disorders, however, cause a significantly increased variation in cell size. Higher RDW values indicate greater variation in size. Normal reference range of RDW-CV in human red blood cells is 11.5–15.4%. If anemia is observed, RDW test results are often used together with mean corpuscular volume (MCV) results to determine the possible causes of the anemia. It is mainly used to differentiate an anemia of mixed causes from an anemia of a single cause.

Deficiencies of Vitamin B_{12} or folate produce a macrocytic anemia (large cell anemia) in which the RDW is elevated in roughly two-thirds of all cases. However, a varied size distribution of red blood cells is a hallmark of iron deficiency anemia, and as such shows an increased RDW in virtually all cases. In the case of both iron and B_{12} deficiencies, there will normally be a mix of both large cells and small cells, causing the RDW to be elevated. An elevated RDW (red blood cells of unequal sizes) is known as anisocytosis.

An elevation in the RDW is not characteristic of all anemias. Anemia of chronic disease, hereditary spherocytosis, acute blood loss, aplastic anemia (anemia resulting from an inability of the bone marrow to produce red blood cells), and certain hereditary hemoglobinopathies (including some cases of thalassemia minor) may all present with a normal RDW.

== Calculations ==
The "width" in RDW is sometimes thought to be "misleading", since it in fact is a measure of deviation of the volume of RBCs, and not directly the diameter. RDW-CV "width" refers to the width of the volume curve (distribution width), not the width of the cells.

RDW-SD is calculated as the width (in fL) of the RBC size distribution histogram at the 20% height level. This parameter is, therefore, not influenced by the average RBC size (mean corpuscular volume, MCV).

RDW-CV (expressed in %) is calculated with the following formula:

RDW-CV = (1 standard deviation of RBC volume ÷ MCV) × 100%.

Since RDW-CV is mathematically derived from MCV, it is therefore affected by the average RBC size (MCV).

== Pathological implications ==
=== Normal RDW ===
Anemia in the presence of a normal RDW may suggest thalassemia. A low Mentzer Index, calculated from CBC data [MCV/RBC < 13], may suggest this disorder but a hemoglobin electrophoresis would be diagnostic. Anemia of chronic diseases show normal RDW.

=== High RDW ===
High RDW may be a result of the presence of fragments, groups of agglutination, and/or abnormal shape of red blood cells.

- Iron-deficiency anemia usually presents with high RDW and low MCV.
- Folate and vitamin B_{12} deficiency anemia usually presents with high RDW and high MCV.
- Mixed-deficiency (iron + B_{12} or folate) anemia usually presents with high RDW and variable MCV.
- Recent hemorrhages typically present with high RDW and normal MCV.
- A false high RDW reading can occur if EDTA anticoagulated blood is used instead of citrated blood. See Pseudothrombocytopenia.

By severity, elevated RDW can be classified as follows:

RDW in adults	Severity	Most notable causes
14.5% - 18%	Mild anisocytosis	Infection, vigorous exercise or certain drugs. Iron deficiency anemia in the presence of anemia and microcytosis.
18% - 26%	Moderate anisocytosis	Severe iron deficiency anemia, megaloblastic anemia.
> 26%	Severe anisocytosis	Sideroblastic anemia
