= Mean corpuscular hemoglobin =

Average mass of hemoglobin (Hb) per red blood cell (RBC)

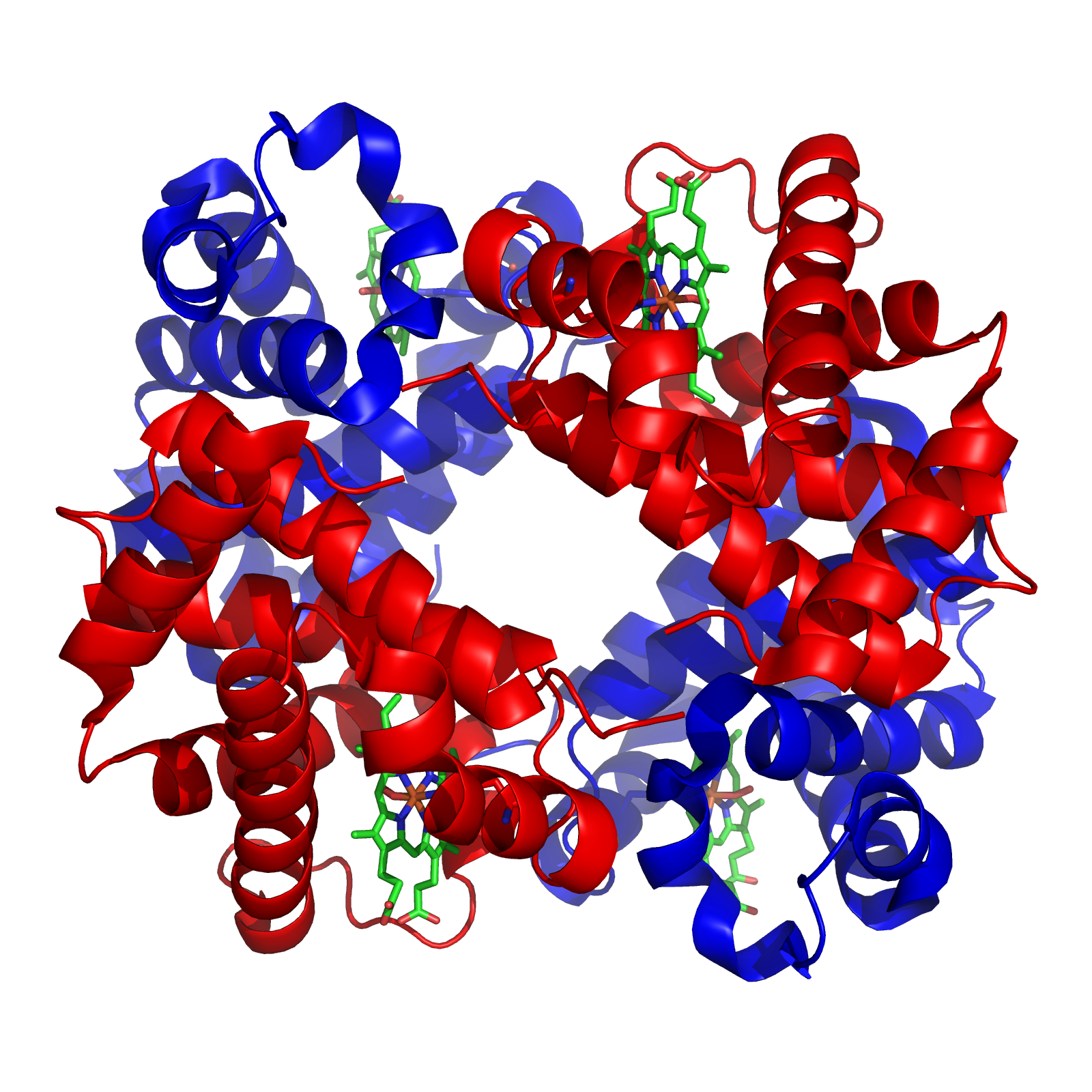
Hemoglobin

The mean corpuscular hemoglobin, or "mean cell hemoglobin" (MCH), is the average mass of hemoglobin (Hb) per red blood cell (RBC) in a sample of blood. It is reported as part of a standard complete blood count. MCH value is diminished in hypochromic anemias. RBCs are either normochromic or hypochromic. They are never "hyperchromic". If more than the normal amount of hemoglobin is made, the cells get larger—they do not become darker.

It is calculated by dividing the total mass of hemoglobin by the number of red blood cells in a volume of blood.

MCH=(Hb*10)/RBC (in millions)

A normal MCH value in humans is 27 to 33 picograms (pg)/cell. The amount of hemoglobin per RBC depends on hemoglobin synthesis and the size of the RBC.

The mass of the red cell is determined by the iron (as part of the hemoglobin molecule), thus MCH in picograms is roughly the mass of one red cell. In iron deficiency anemia the cell mass becomes lighter, thus a MCH below 27 pg is an indication of iron deficiency.

The MCH decreases when Hb synthesis is reduced, or when RBCs are smaller than normal, such as in cases of iron-deficiency anemia. Conversion to SI-units: 1 pg of hemoglobin = 0.06207 femtomole (fmol). Normal value converted to SI-units: 1.68 – 1.92 fmol/cell.

== See also ==
- Red blood cell indices
- Mean corpuscular hemoglobin concentration
- Mean corpuscular volume
