= Macroovalocyte =

Oval-shaped red blood cell

Macroovalocytes are enlarged, oval-shaped erythrocytes (red blood cells). They are not seen in healthy blood, and are most commonly seen in megaloblastic anemia. In most instances, the macroovalocyte morphology is due to megaloblastic erythropoiesis (Vitamin B-12 or folate deficiency) but may be seen with dyserythropoiesis. Although macroovalocytes are characteristic in these deficiency states, they are not pathognomonic. Poikilocytosis is often present, particularly in more advanced cases. If associated with hypersegmented granulocytes in the absence of other causes (e.g. drugs), the findings are essentially diagnostic of Vitamin B-12 or folate deficiency.
