= Anisocytosis =

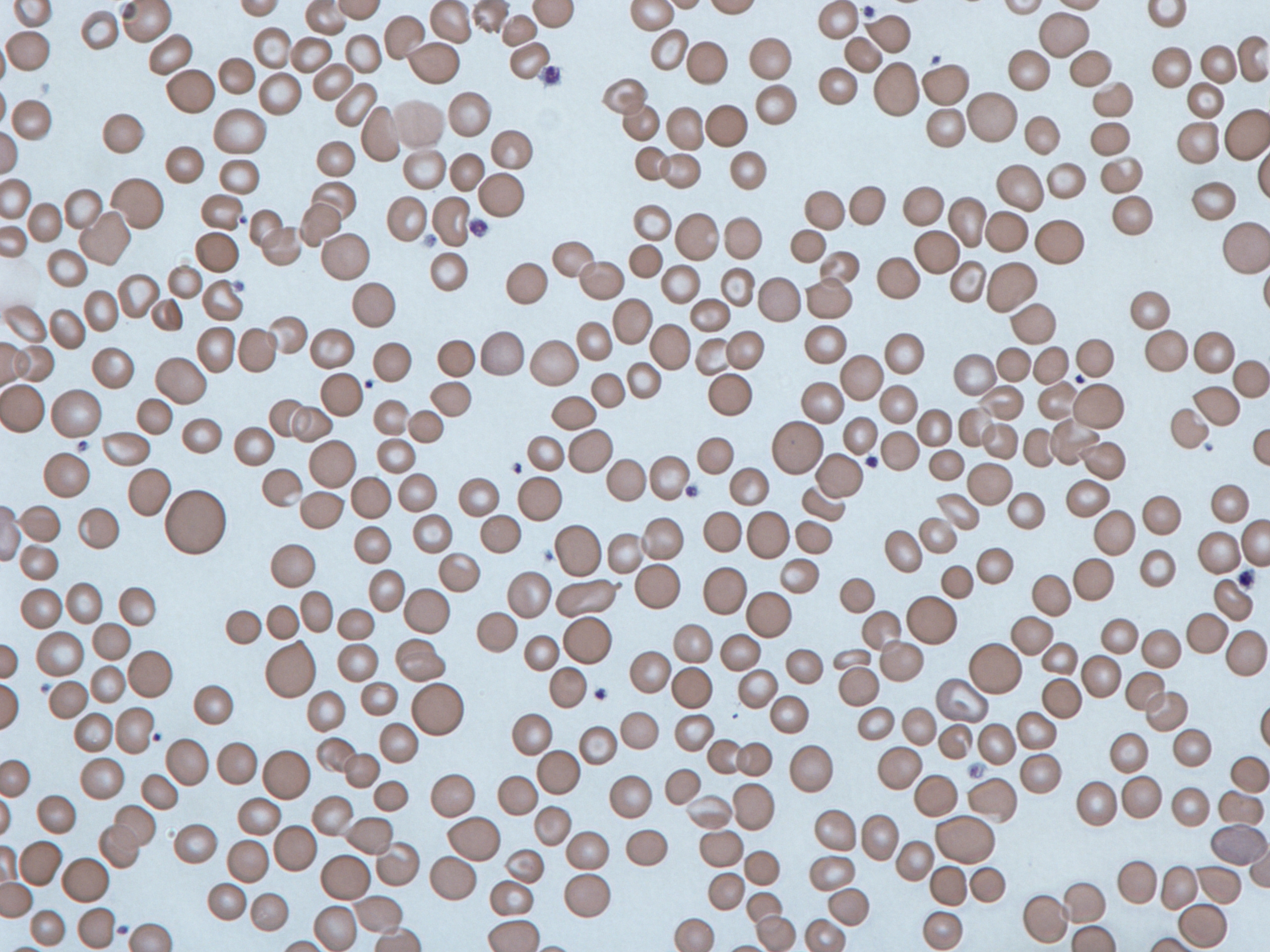
- Human red blood cells from a case of anisocytosis.

Anisocytosis is a medical term meaning that a patient's red blood cells are of unequal size. This is commonly found in anemia and other blood conditions. False diagnostic flagging may be triggered on a complete blood count by an elevated WBC count, agglutinated RBCs, RBC fragments, giant platelets or platelet clumps due to anisocytosis. In addition, it is a characteristic feature of bovine blood.

The red cell distribution width (RDW) is a measurement of anisocytosis and is calculated as a coefficient of variation of the distribution of RBC volumes divided by the mean corpuscular volume (MCV).

== Types ==
Anisocytosis may be assessed using the red blood cell distribution width (RDW), while the average size of red blood cells is measured by the mean corpuscular volume (MCV). Based on the MCV, anisocytosis may be associated with microcytic, macrocytic, or normocytic red blood cells.

Anisocytosis with microcytosis may occur in conditions such as iron-deficiency anemia and sickle cell disease. Anisocytosis with macrocytosis may occur in folate deficiency, vitamin B12 deficiency, autoimmune hemolytic anemia, following cytotoxic chemotherapy, and in chronic liver disease or myelodysplastic syndrome. Anisocytosis with a normal MCV may be seen in early iron, vitamin B12, or folate deficiency, as well as in dimorphic anemia, sickle cell disease, chronic liver disease, and myelodysplastic syndrome.

The RDW is typically increased in iron-deficiency anemia, whereas it may be normal or only mildly increased in some forms of thalassemia, including thalassemia major (Cooley anemia) and thalassemia intermedia.

== Etymology ==
From Ancient Greek: an- without, or negative quality, iso- equal, cyt- cell, -osis condition.

== See also ==
- Anisopoikilocytosis
- Poikilocytosis
- Red blood cell distribution width
