= Mean corpuscular hemoglobin concentration =

Measure of hemoglobin concentration in red blood cells

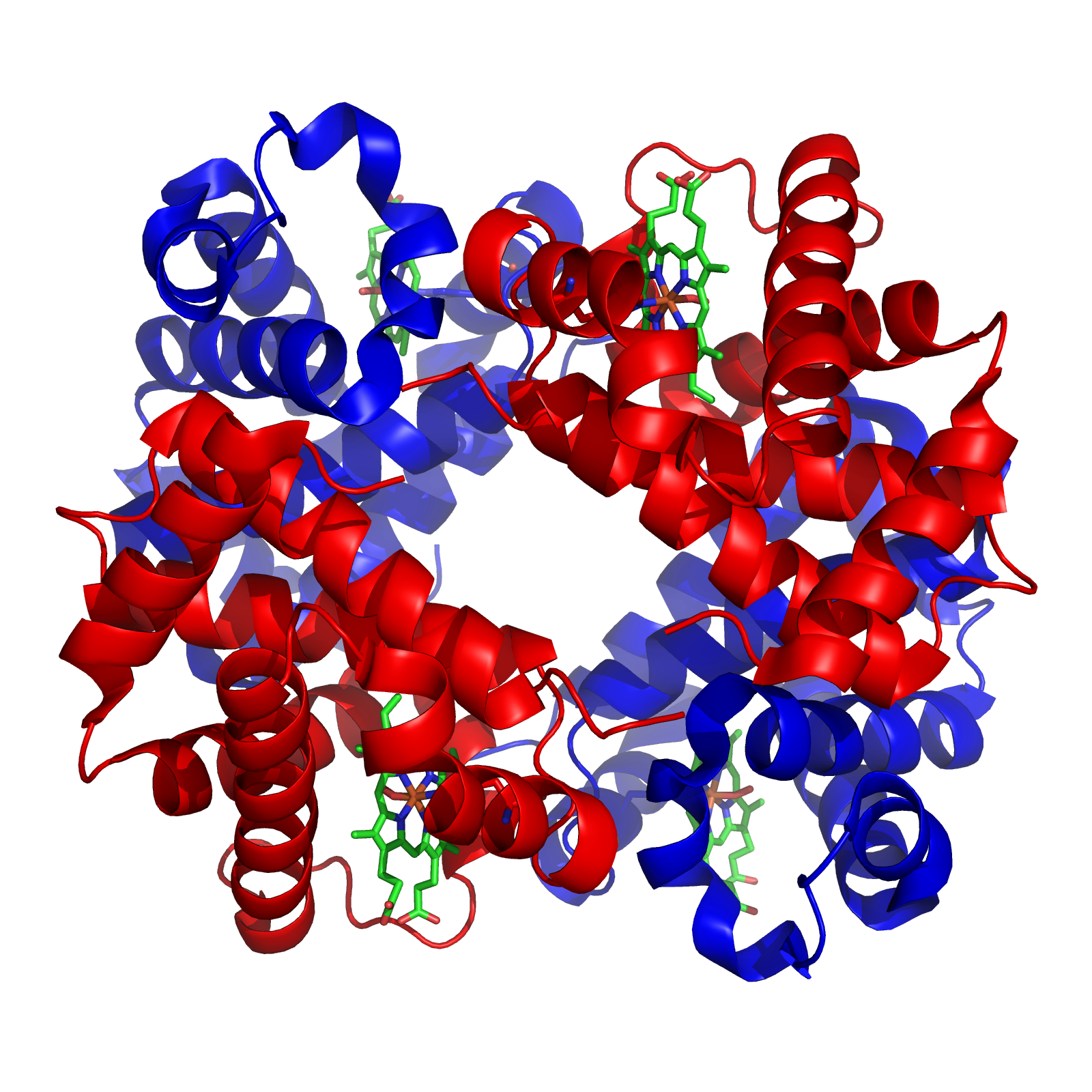
Hemoglobin

The mean corpuscular hemoglobin concentration (MCHC) is a measure of the concentration of hemoglobin in a given volume of packed red blood cell.

It is calculated by dividing the hemoglobin by the hematocrit. Reference ranges for blood tests are 32 to 36 g/dL (320 to 360g/L), or between 4.81 and 5.58 mmol/L. It is thus a mass or molar concentration. Still, many instances measure MCHC in percentage (%), as if it were a mass fraction (m_{Hb} / m_{RBC}). Numerically, however, the MCHC in g/dL and the mass fraction of hemoglobin in red blood cells in % are identical, assuming an RBC density of 1g/mL and negligible hemoglobin in plasma.

== Interpretation ==
A low MCHC can be interpreted as identifying decreased production of hemoglobin. MCHC can be normal even when hemoglobin production is decreased (such as in iron deficiency) due to a calculation artifact. MCHC can be elevated ("hyperchromic") in hereditary spherocytosis, sickle cell disease and homozygous hemoglobin C disease, depending upon the hemocytometer. MCHC can be elevated in some megaloblastic anemias. MCHC can be falsely elevated when there is agglutination of red cells (falsely lowering the measured RBC count) or when there is opacification of the plasma (falsely increasing the measured hemoglobin). Causes of plasma opacification that can falsely increase the MCHC include hyperbilirubinemia, hypertriglyceridemia, and free hemoglobin in the plasma (due to hemolysis).

== Complicating conditions ==
Because of the way automated analysers count blood cells, a very high MCHC (greater than about 37.0 g/dL) may indicate the blood is from someone with a cold agglutinin, or there may be some other problem resulting in one or more artifactual results affecting the MCHC.

For example, for some patients with cold agglutinins, when their blood gets colder than 37 °C, the red cells will clump together. As a result, the analyzer may incorrectly report a low number of very dense red blood cells. This will result in an impossibly high number when the analyzer calculates the MCHC. This problem is usually picked up by the laboratory before the result is reported. The blood can be warmed until the cells separate from each other, and quickly put through the machine while still warm.

There are four steps to perform when a suspect increased MCHC (>370 g/L or >37.0 g/dL) is received from the analyzer:

1. Remix the EDTA tube—if the MCHC corrects, report corrected results
2. Incubation at 37 °C—if the MCHC corrects, report corrected results and comment on possible cold agglutinin
3. Saline replacement: Replace plasma with same amount of saline to exclude interference e.g. Lipemia and Auto-immune antibodies—if the MCHC corrects, report corrected results and comment on Lipemia
4. Check the slide for spherocytosis (e.g. in hereditary spherocytosis, among other causes)

== Worked example ==
Measure	Units	Conventional units	Conversion
Hct	40%		
Hb	100 grams/liter	10 grams/deciliter	(deci- is 10^{−1})
RBC	5E+12 cells/liter	5E+6 cells/μL	(micro is 10^{−6})
MCV = (Hct/100) / RBC	8E-14 liters/cell	80 femtoliters/cell	(femto- is 10^{−15})
MCH = Hb / RBC	2E-11 grams/cell	20 picograms/cell	(pico- is 10^{−12})
MCHC = Hb / (Hct/100)	250 grams/liter	25 grams/deciliter	(deci is 10^{−1})

== See also ==
- Red blood cell indices
  - Mean corpuscular volume
  - Mean corpuscular hemoglobin
