= Mean corpuscular volume =

Average volume of a red blood cell, which sometimes helps in diagnosis

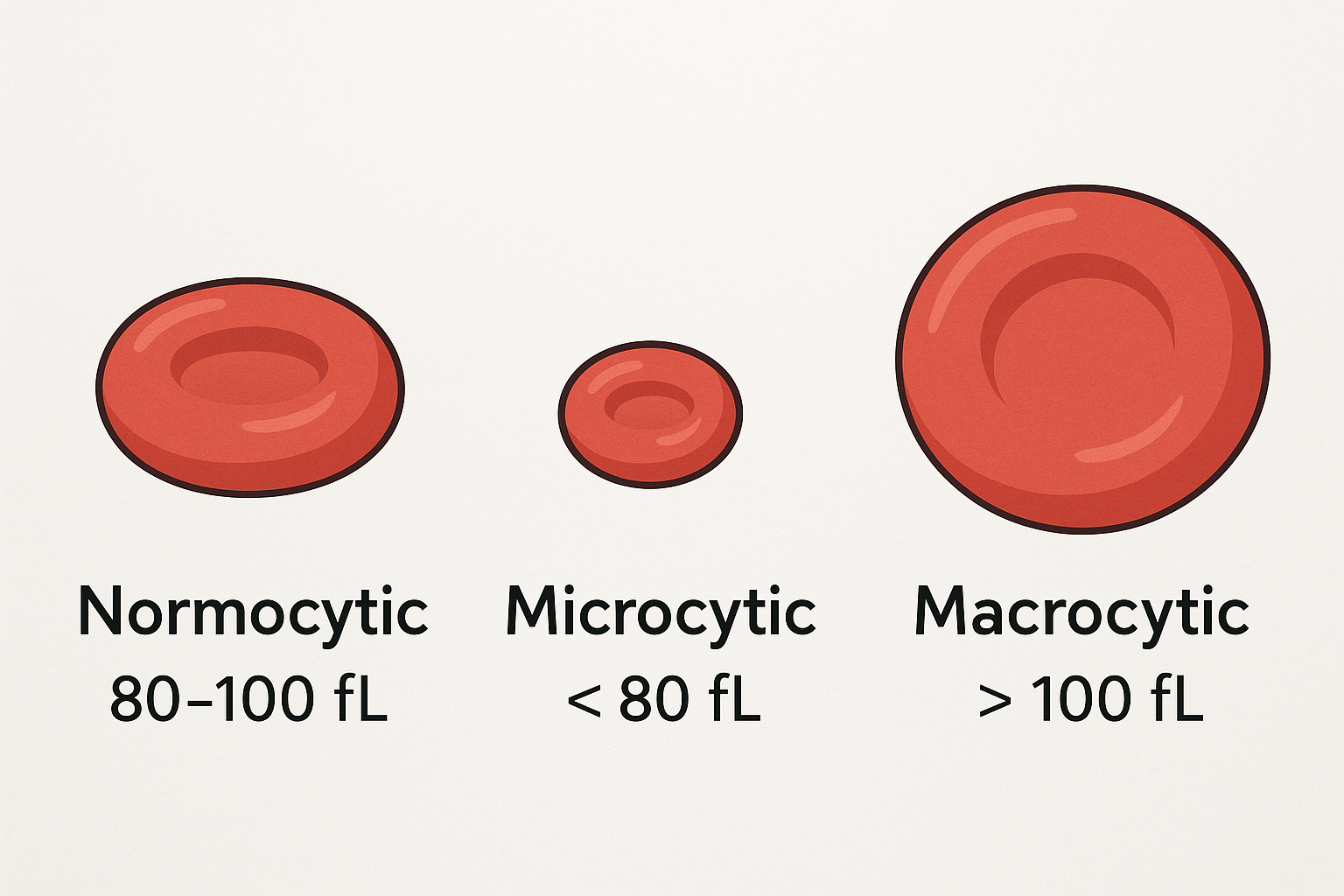
- Types of anemias by MCV
- Purpose: MCV measurement that allows classification as either a microcytic anemia, normocytic anemia or macrocytic anemia

The mean corpuscular volume, or mean cell volume (MCV), is a measure of the average volume of a red blood corpuscle (or red blood cell, RBC). The measure is obtained by multiplying a volume of blood by the proportion of blood that is cellular (the hematocrit), and dividing that product by the number of erythrocytes (red blood cells) in that volume. The mean corpuscular volume is a part of a standard complete blood count.

In patients with anemia, it is the MCV measurement that allows classification as either a microcytic anemia (MCV below normal range), normocytic anemia (MCV within normal range) or macrocytic anemia (MCV above normal range). Normocytic anemia is usually deemed so because the bone marrow has not yet responded with a change in cell volume. It occurs occasionally in acute conditions, namely blood loss and hemolysis.

If the MCV was determined by automated equipment, the result can be compared to RBC morphology on a peripheral blood smear, where a normal RBC is about the size of a normal lymphocyte nucleus. Any deviation would usually be indicative of either faulty equipment or technician error, although there are some conditions that present with high MCV without megaloblast RBCs.

For further specification, it can be used to calculate red blood cell distribution width (RDW). The RDW is a statistical calculation made by automated analyzers that reflects the variability in size and shape of the RBCs.

== Calculation ==
To calculate MCV, the hematocrit (Hct) is divided by the concentration of RBCs ([RBC])

$\textit{MCV} = \frac{\textit{PCV}}{\text{RBC count}}$

The normal range for MCV is 80–100 fL.

If the hematocrit is expressed as a percentage, the red blood cell concentration as millions per microliter, and the MCV in femtoliters, the formula becomes

$\textit{MCV} / \mathrm{L} = \frac{\mathit{Hct\%}/100}{[\text{RBCmmL}]\times (10^6/10^{-6})/\mathrm{L}^{-1}}$

$\textit{MCV} / \mathrm{fL} = \textit{MCV} / (10^{-15}\,\mathrm{L}) = 10^{15} \frac{\mathit{Hct\%}/100}{[\text{RBCmmL}]\times 10^{12}} = \frac{\mathit{Hct\%}\times 10}{[\text{RBCmmL}]}$

For example, if the Hct = 42.5% and [RBC] = 4.58 million per microliter (4,580,000/μL), then

$\textit{MCV} = \frac{0.425}{4.58 \cdot 10^6/(10^{-6} \, \mathrm{L})} = 92.8 \cdot 10^{-15} \, \mathrm{L} = 92.8 \, \mathrm{fL}$

Using implied units,

$\textit{MCV}/\textrm{fL} = \frac{42.5 \times 10}{4.58} = 92.8$

The MCV can be determined in a number of ways by automatic analyzers. In volume-sensitive automated blood cell counters, such as the Coulter counter, the red cells pass one-by-one through a small aperture and generate a signal directly proportional to their volume. Other automated counters measure red blood cell volume by means of techniques that measure refracted, diffracted, or scattered light.

== Interpretation ==
The normal reference range is typically 80-100 fL.

=== High ===
In pernicious anemia (macrocytic), MCV can range up to 150 femtolitres. An elevated MCV is also associated with alcoholism (as are an elevated GGT and an AST/ALT ratio of 2:1). Vitamin B12 and/or folic acid deficiency has also been associated with macrocytic anemia (high MCV numbers).

=== Low ===
The most common causes of microcytic anemia are iron deficiency (due to inadequate dietary intake, gastrointestinal blood loss, or menstrual blood loss), thalassemia, sideroblastic anemia or chronic disease. In iron deficiency anemia (microcytic anemia), it can be as low as 60 to 70 femtolitres. In some cases of thalassemia, the MCV may be low even though the patient is not iron deficient.

== Worked example ==
Measure	Units	Conventional units	Conversion
Hct	40%		
Hb	100 grams/liter	10 grams/deciliter	(deci- is 10^{−1})
RBC	5E+12 cells/liter	5E+6 cells/μL	(micro is 10^{−6})
MCV = (Hct/100) / RBC	8E-14 liters/cell	80 femtoliters/cell	(femto- is 10^{−15})
MCH = Hb / RBC	2E-11 grams/cell	20 picograms/cell	(pico- is 10^{−12})
MCHC = Hb / (Hct/100)	250 grams/liter	25 grams/deciliter	(deci is 10^{−1})

== Derivation ==
The MCV can be conceptualized as the total volume of a group of cells divided by the number of cells. For a real world sized example, imagine you had 10 small jellybeans with a combined volume of 10 μL. The mean volume of a jellybean in this group would be 10 μL / 10 jellybeans = 1 μL / jellybean. A similar calculation works for MCV.

1. Measure the RBC index in cells/μL. Take the reciprocal (1/RBC index) to convert it to μL/cell.

$$\frac{1}{5 \times 10^{6}}\ \mathrm{\mu L/ cell} = 2 \times 10^{-7}\ \mathrm{\mu L/cell}$$

2. The 1 μL is only made of a proportion of red cells (e.g. 40%) with the rest of the volume composed of plasma. Multiply by the hematocrit (a unitless quantity) to take this into account.

$$2 \times 10^{-7}\ \mathrm{\mu L/cell} \times 0.4 = 8 \times 10^{-8}\ \mathrm{\mu L/cell}$$

3. Finally, convert the units of μL to fL by multiplying by $10^9$. The result would look like this:

$$8 \times 10^{-8}\ \mathrm{\mu L/ cell} \times \frac{10^9\ \mathrm{fL}}{1\ \mathrm{\mu L}} = 80\ \frac{\mathrm{fL}}{\mathrm{cell}}$$

Note: the shortcut proposed above just makes the units work out: $10 \times 40 \div 5 = 80$
