= Dihydrofolate reductase deficiency =

Human disease

Dihydrofolate Reductase Deficiency
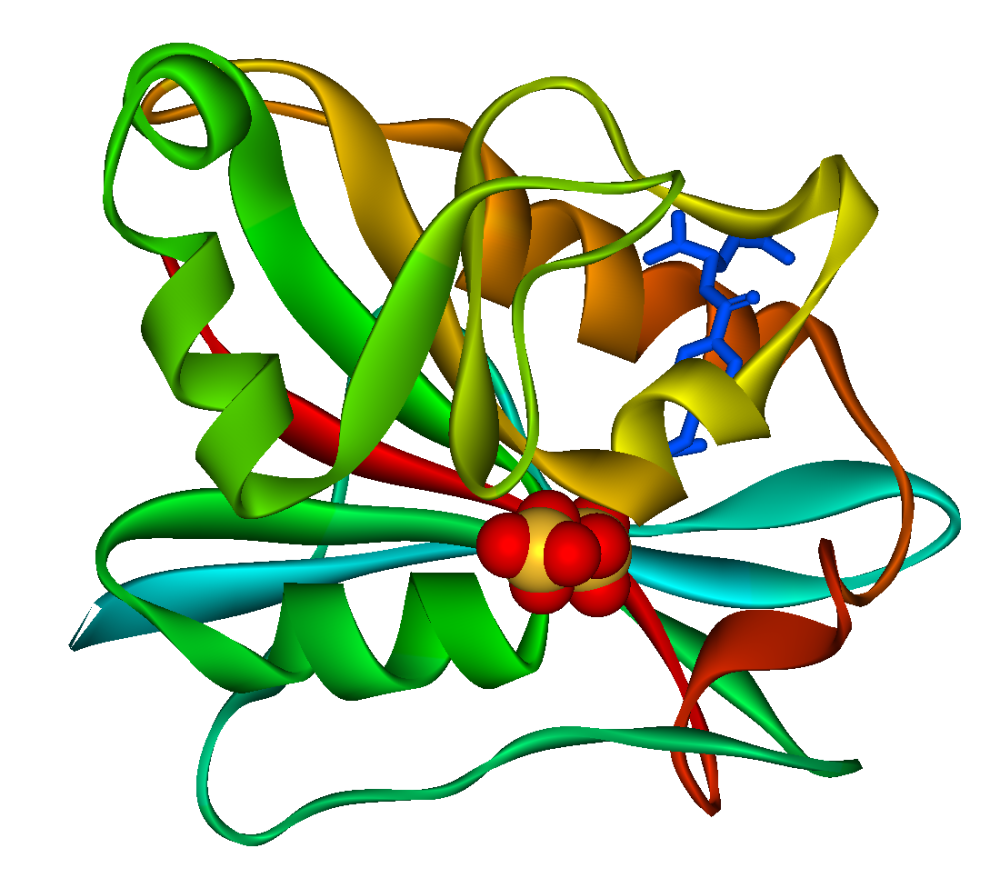
- Ribbon diagram of human dihydrofolate reductase in complex with folate (blue). Created using Accelrys DS Visualizer Pro 1.6 and the GIMP.
- Symptoms: Megaloblastic anemia, Cerebral folate deficiency, Developmental Delay, Seizures
- Causes: Genetic (autosomal recessive)
- Treatment: Folinic acid
- Frequency: Ultra-rare disease

Dihydrofolate reductase deficiency (DHFR deficiency) is an ultra-rare condition with less than 20 reported cases within the literature, as of 2025. It is an inherited disorder of folate metabolism caused by biallelic pathogenic mutations in the DHFR gene. Functionally, loss or significant reduction of DHFR activity impairs biological processes such as the conversion of dihydrofolate (DHF) to tetrahydrofolate (THF), the conversion of folic acid to dihydrofolate, and the recycling of tetrahydrobiopterin from dihydrobiopterin. These disrupt processes important for normal DNA replication and cell division, as well as neurotransmitter synthesis.

Presented symptoms vary greatly, but include megaloblastic anemia, cerebral folate deficiency, significantly reduced or absence of cerebrospinal-fluid folate (5-methyltetrahydrofolate) and neurological symptoms of varying type and severity such as seizures, developmental delay, and microcephaly. The disorder follows an autosomal recessive mode of inheritance pattern. Diagnosis is typically conducted through combinations of genetic testing, biochemical assessment of specific metabolites (tetrahydrobiopterin, folate) in the body, and measurement of DHFR enzyme presence and activity. Treatment with folinic acid has been shown to improve some patient symptoms. The first confirmed cases of the condition were reported in 2011.

== Dihydrofolate reductase protein ==
Dihydrofolate reductase (DHFR) is a conserved enzyme found in all organisms that consists of 187 amino acids and exhibits an α/β-fold structure (protein secondary structure). It catalyzes the reaction of dihydrofolate (DHF) to tetrahydrofolate (THF) through stereospecific hydride transfer (transfer of a H- hydride ion(s) that results in the creation of a single specific stereoisomer), as well as the folic acid to DHF reaction at a lower rate.

THF and its derivatives are important in de novo synthesis of purines, thymidines, and various amino acids, which are important in the creation of DNA, cell proliferation and cell growth. It has also been shown to have a role in the recycling of tetrahydrobiopterin from dihydrobiopterin, which is a key cofactor for enzymes that synthesize important neurotransmitters including serotonin, melatonin, dopamine, norepinephrine, epinephrine, and nitric oxide.Tetrahydrobiopterin is also used as a cofactor in the metabolism of phenylalanine.

While the protein is expressed in most tissues with the exception of connective tissue, soft tissue and the eye, its RNA is expressed in all tissues in varying amounts.

The enzyme's core is formed by an eight-stranded β-sheet surrounded by four α-helices on each side. Its active site, located near the N-terminus, forms an opening that binds both the cofactor NADPH and the substrate folate or dihydrofolate, facilitating the enzyme's catalytic activity. Within this active site, three protein domains called the Met20, F-G, and G-H loops act as a flexible lid that encloses the cofactor NADPH and the substrate, stabilizing their interaction during catalysis of the reaction. Gene variants that affect this mechanism are common reasons for loss of function.

Another structural class of DHFR exists in bacterial chromosomes that is evolutionarily unrelated to the mammalian class. This class of DHFR has much greater variation in mechanism due to evolutionary pressures from antibiotics compared to its mammalian counterpart, leading to many "types" being classified under this class.

== Signs and symptoms ==
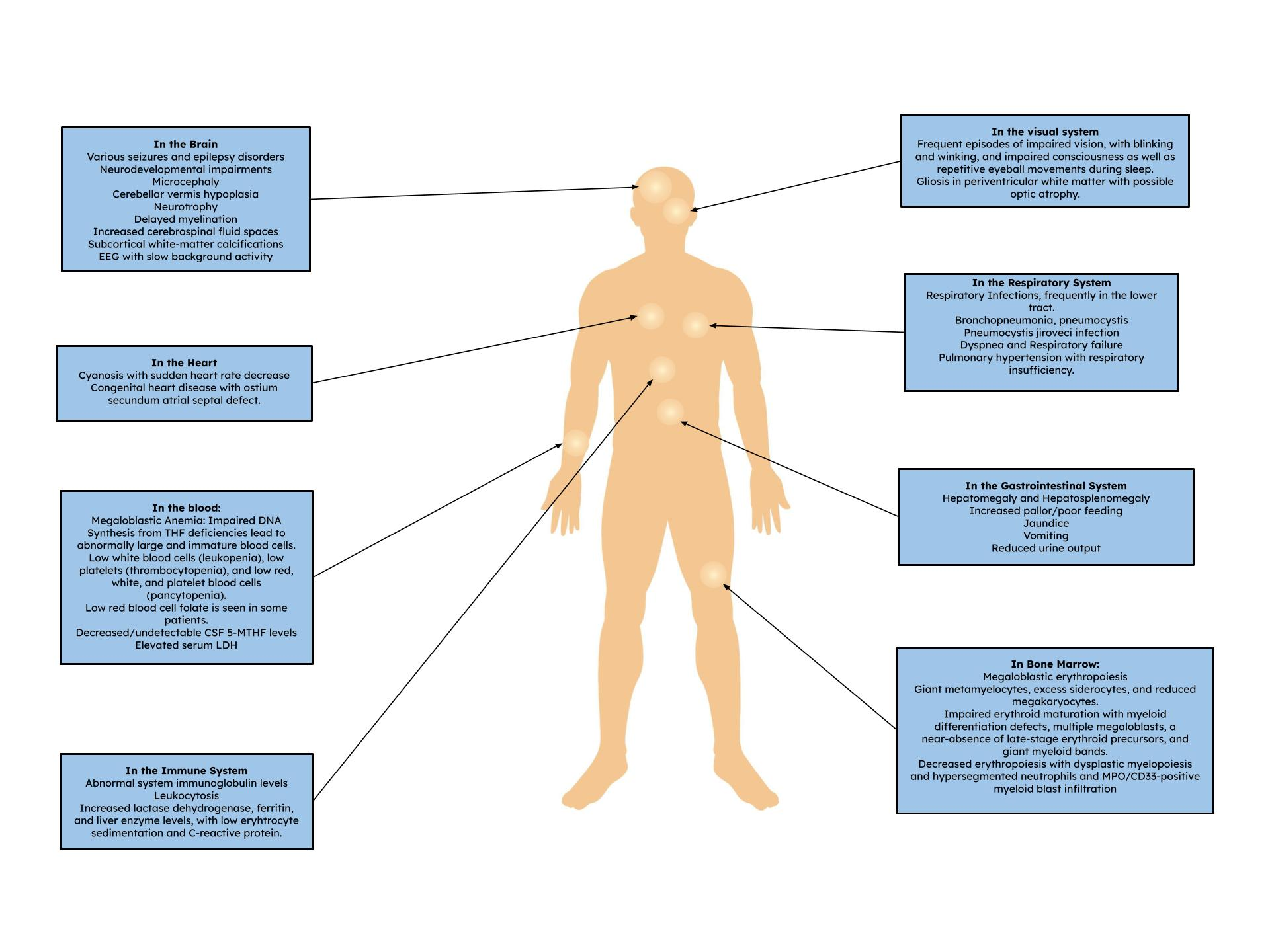
All reported DHFR deficiency symptoms from the available case studies visualized

Verified cases of individuals with DHFR deficiency have included cases with both megaloblastic anemia (anemia with immature abnormally large red blood cells) and neurological manifestations. One report described considerable variation in clinical manifestations, noting that some patients had marked neurological symptoms with hematological (blood-related) abnormalities, whereas others had mild findings or no clear clinical signs.

=== Hematologic features ===
Megaloblastic anemia has been reported in several individuals with DHFR deficiency. Macrocytosis without anemia (enlarged red blood cells with a normal cell count) and megaloblastic anemia have been reported in affected siblings. Pancytopenia (low count in all blood cell types) has been reported in some individuals with DHFR deficiency. Thrombocytopenia (low platelet count) has also been reported in affected individuals. Leukopenia (low white blood cell count) has been described in at least one affected individual. Peripheral blood smear examination (microscopic analysis of circulating blood cells) in one affected individual showed both macrocytes (enlarged red blood cells), microcytes (abnormally small red blood cells), in addition to hyper segmented neutrophils(white blood cells with excessively segmented nuclei). Low folate levels in red blood cells has been reported in some individuals with DHFR deficiency. Normal serum folate (folate in blood) concentrations have been described in multiple affected individuals. Decreased or undetectable cerebrospinal fluid 5-methyltetrahydrofolate (a tetrahydrofolate derivative) levels have been reported in affected individuals. Increased serum lactate dehydrogenase (an enzyme involved in energy metabolism) levels have been documented in some individuals with DHFR deficiency.

=== Bone marrow features ===
Bone marrow investigations have revealed megaloblastic erythropoiesis (production of enlarged red blood cells) in several individuals with DHFR deficiency. In one affected individual, bone marrow aspiration (a procedure that collects bone marrow for examination) showed megaloblastic erythropoiesis with early (immature) and late (more developed) megaloblasts (enlarged and immature red blood cell precursors), giant metamyelocytes (immature white blood cells), excess siderocytes (red blood cells containing iron granules), and reduced megakaryocytes (large bone marrow cells that produce platelets). In another affected individual, bone marrow biopsy demonstrated severely impaired erythroid outgrowth (expansion of red blood cell precursors) with a myeloid differentiation (maturation of bone-marrow-derived myeloid cells) defect, the presence of multiple megaloblasts, an almost complete absence of late-stage red blood cell precursors, and giant myeloid bands. In a further case, a bone marrow smear (microscopic examination of a sample of bone marrow) showed decreased erythropoiesis (red blood cell production) with megaloblasts and abnormal myeloid cell production with hypersegmented neutrophils.

=== Neurological features ===
Seizures and epilepsy have been reported in several individuals with DHFR deficiency.Neurodevelopmental impairments have been described in several affected individuals, including moderately severe developmental disorders with epilepsy, severe developmental delay, and later-emerging neurodevelopmental delay unresponsive to treatment. Learning difficulties have been reported alongside atypical absence epilepsy (epilepsy with slow, irregular episodes of impaired awareness and staring) in childhood in at least one patient. Developmental delay with central hypotonia (low muscle tone from central nervous system dysfunction) and poor head control has been described in one affected child. Microcephaly (abnormally small head size) has been reported in several individuals with DHFR deficiency, and secondary microcephaly (small head size developing after birth) has been documented in one affected individual. Neuroimaging in one affected individual has shown cerebellar vermis hypoplasia (underdeveloped central region of the cerebellum), cerebellar and cerebral atrophy (loss of tissue), a thin corpus callosum, delayed myelination, increased cerebrospinal fluid volume, and ventricular dilatation (enlarged fluid-filled cavities where cerebrospinal fluid circulates). Additional neuroimaging findings reported in separate individuals include underdeveloped or thin corpus callosum, brain atrophy, and presence of calcium deposits within brain tissue; cortical laminar necrosis (neuronal death in specific layers of the cerebral cortex), hemorrhagic leukomalacia (white-matter injury with bleeding), vermis inferior hypoplasia (underdeveloped lower cerebellar midline structure), and widespread supratentorial and infratentorial tissue loss (tissue loss above and below the tentorium, the membrane dividing upper and lower brain regions). Post-mortem neuropathologic examination has revealed a small brain with ventricular dilatation, white-matter atrophy, and calcifications in the basal ganglia and subcortical (regions under the cerebral cortex) white matter in one affected individual.

=== Infectious and immunologic features ===
Respiratory infections have been reported in several individuals with DHFR deficiency, including frequent lower respiratory tract infections, Pneumocystis jirovecii infection, and bronchopneumonia. The infant with Pneumocystis jirovecii infection had leukocytosis (high white blood cell count) despite normal absolute lymphocyte counts (the number of lymphocytes detected in blood), CD4/CD8 ratio (the proportion of helper T cells to cytotoxic T cells), naive/memory lymphocyte proportions (the distribution of newly formed and memory lymphocytes), and lymphocyte proliferation. The affected child with bronchopneumonia had decreased IgA (antibody found mainly in mucous membranes and secretions) and IgM (antibody produced early in the immune response) concentrations. Death due to Klebsiella aerogenes pneumonia has been reported in one infant with DHFR deficiency. In another case, death occurred following severe pneumonia and respiratory failure in early infancy. Herpes stomatitis has also been reported in one affected infant.

=== Gastrointestinal and constitutional features ===
Hepatomegaly (enlarged liver) has been reported in several infants with DHFR deficiency. Other symptoms described in affected patients include: pallor (unusual paleness of the skin), reduced oral intake with icterus (yellow discoloration of the skin and eyes), failure to thrive, coughing, and vomiting, fever, loose stools, pale complexion, and reduced urine output. Feeding via gastrostomy (a procedure that forms an opening into the stomach) has been reported in one affected child. One infant presented after a choking episode with hypothermia (low body temperature) and profound anemia and died shortly after arrival, with post-mortem examination showing hepatosplenomegaly (enlarged liver and spleen) and enlarged lymph nodes.

=== Cardiopulmonary features ===
Respiratory failure and dyspnea (difficulty breathing) have been reported in infants with DHFR deficiency affected by Pneumocystis jirovecii infection. Respiratory failure has also been described in one affected infant with severe pneumonia. Pulmonary hypertension (elevated blood pressure in the pulmonary circulation) and repeating respiratory insufficiency leading to death from pulmonary complications at four months of age has been reported in one affected infant. Cyanosis (blue coloration of the skin due to low oxygen levels) with a decrease in heart rate preceding death has been reported in one affected infant. Congenital heart disease (a heart condition present at birth) with an ostium secundum atrial septal defect (a defect in the central portion of the wall dividing the atria of the heart) has been reported in one affected infant.

=== Ophthalmologic and sensory features ===
Frequent episodes of impaired vision with blinking and winking, partially associated with impaired consciousness (reduced awareness or alertness) and repetitive eyeball movements during sleep, have been reported in one affected patient. Post-mortem examination in one affected infant has revealed gliosis (buildup of glial cells following nervous system damage) in the periventricular white matter (white matter located around the brain's ventricles) with possible optic atrophy.

== Genetics ==
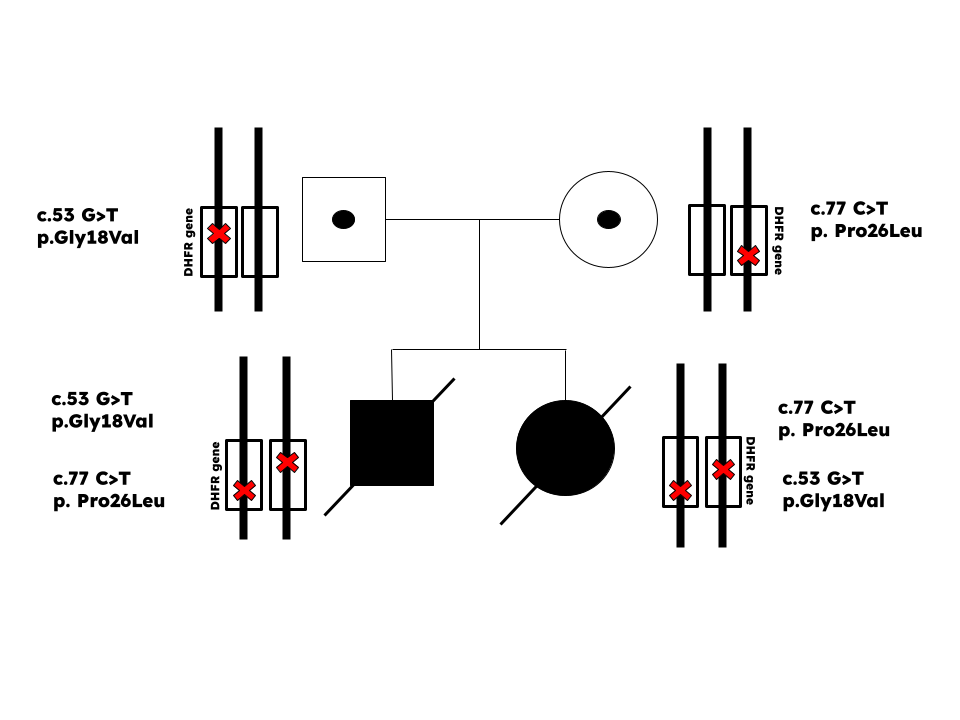
Pedigree diagram of compound heterozygotes for DHFR deficiency.

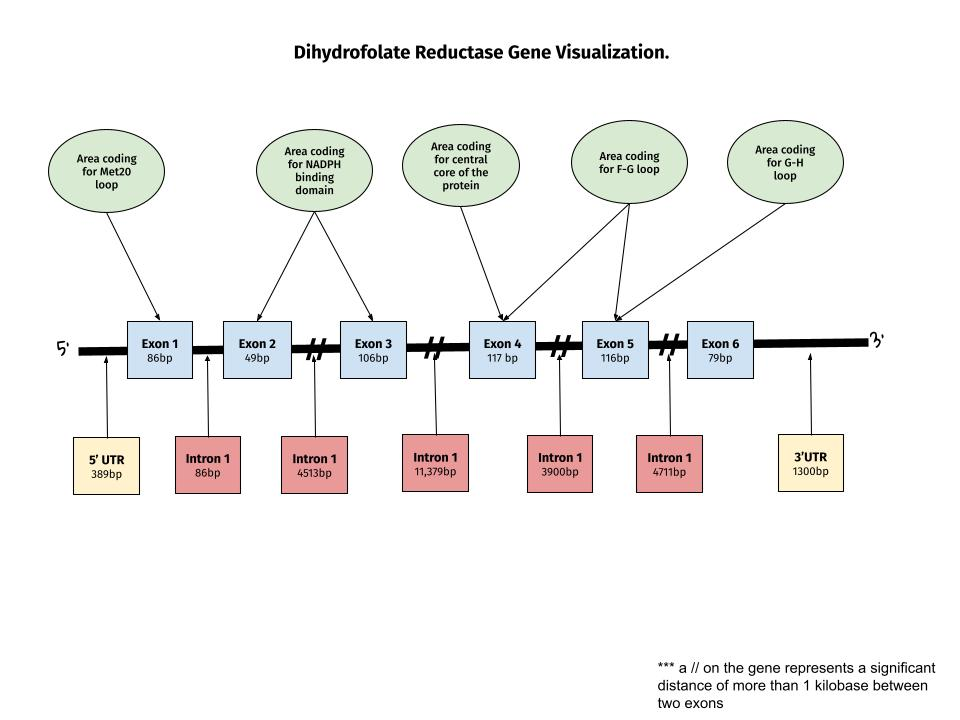
Visualization of the DHFR gene with regions that code for important functional domains on the DHFR protein.

DHFR deficiency is consistent with an autosomal recessive inheritance model. The gene that codes for the functional variant has 6 exons, and 5 introns. The gene is located on the long arm, or q arm of chromosome 5, in the q14.1 region, between nucleotide 79613515 and nucleotide 82033415 on the Human Genome Assembly (hg38), however, processed pseudogenes (pseudogenes that are formed through reverse-transcribed mRNA) lacking introns have been found on separate chromosomes. Specifically, pseudogene-1 (DHFRP1) was mapped to chromosome 18, pseudogene-2 (DHFRP2) was mapped to chromosome 6, pseudogene-3 (DHFRP3) was mapped to chromosome 2, and pseudogene-4 (DHFRP4) was mapped to chromosome 3. DHFR RNA is expressed in all tissues in varying amounts, however functional DHFR protein is not expressed in connective tissue, soft tissue and the eye. The disease causing variant differs across affected cases on different exons. Cases of affected patients showed both compound heterozygote (where a different gene variant is on the same gene locus on two homologous chromosomes) and homozygous genotypes for a single disease-causing variant.

The compound heterozygote variants were not found in public population databases or local control samples that were used in the study, which they deemed "hallmarks of a rare variant." These variants were given "likely pathogenic variants" classification by the American College of Medical Genetics and Genomics guidelines. The other variants were classified as "pathogenic."

Examples of these variants include homozygous c.61G>A; p.Gly21Arg, homozygous c.458A>T; p.Asp153Val, homozygous c.238C>T; p. Leu80Phe, homozygous c.335 T > G; p.Met112Arg and compound heterozygous c.77C > T; p.Gly18Val and c.53G > T; p.Pro26Leu.

== Pathophysiology ==
DHFR catalyzes the dihydrofolate to tetrahydrofolate reaction, as well as the folic acid to dihydrofolate reaction. Proper folate metabolism by this enzyme is key for the de novo synthesis of purines, thymidines, and various amino acids, which are important in DNA synthesis, cell proliferation and cell growth.DHFR deficiency would also impact recycling of tetrahydrobiopterin from dihydrobiopterin, impacting neurotransmitter synthesis and phenylalanine metabolism. One study linked the lack of cerebral tetrahydrobiopterin to neurodevelopmental symptoms that arise.

Differences in disease causing variants causes unique protein level pathophysiology in different cases:

List of Pathophysiology by Variant
Variant	Location	Protein Level Impact
Homozygous c.238C>T;p. Leu80Phe	Exon 3 (conserved residue)	The addition of a phenylalanine alters the position of a critical lysine 55 amino acid residue, creating steric hindrance (cause of unfavorable conformations) and stopping cofactor binding for the altered protein. DHFR activity was 100 times lower than wild-type, non-altered DHFR.
Compound Heterozygous c.77C>T;p.Gly18Val and c.53G>T;p.Pro26Leu	Both located in the active-site region at the N-terminus.	Gly18Val: This variant altered the torsion angle of the proteins, which negatively affects the thermodynamic stability of the proteins. This led to lower protein expression and activity. Furthermore, Valine is larger than glycine, changing the shape of the substrate binding pocket for NADPH.
Compound Heterozygous c.77C>T;p.Gly18Val and c.53G>T;p.Pro26Leu	Both located in the active-site region at the N-terminus.	Pro26Leu: This variant altered the torsion angle of the proteins, which negatively affects the thermodynamic stability of the proteins. This led to lower protein expression and activity. The variant also disrupted the folding of the Met20 loop protein domain.
Homozygous c.61G>A;p.Gly21Arg	active site region at the N terminus	The Gly21, situated in the substrate binding pocket for NADPH, is replaced with a highly polar, larger arginine. This significantly affects the ability of NADPH to bind within the active site, reducing catalytic efficiency and potentially protein stability as well. A complete absence of DHFR activity was noted.
Homozygous c.458A>T;p.Asp153Val	Exon 5 (ConservedResidue; C-terminus of "F-G" loop)	Asp153 normally stabilizes the "F-G" loop via a hydrogen bond. The mutation disrupts the fold/dynamics of the "F-G" and "Met20" loops (critical for catalysis), leading to reduced catalytic efficiency and protein instability. DHFR activity in lymphoblastoid cells of all three patients was severely reduced to less than 10% of control levels, and protein expression was reduced to 20%-50% compared to control. Fibroblasts showed 70%-80% of control protein expression across the three patients. mRNA expression was not significantly different between wildtype and control subjects.
Homozygous c.335T>G;p.Met112Arg	Not described	Not described

== Diagnosis ==
=== Genetic analysis ===
Genetic diagnosis of DHFR deficiency has been established by identifying mutations in the DHFR gene in affected individuals. Whole-exome sequencing (sequencing of all the gene-coding regions of the genome) has been employed in several reported families to identify homozygous or compound-heterozygous mutations (two different defective copies of the same gene) DHFR variants. In children from first-cousin parents, autozygosity mapping on SNP arrays (analysis used to find stretches of DNA that are the same on both chromosomes) identified a homozygous region at containing DHFR, and sequencing of this region revealed a homozygous variant. In one case study, children from distantly related patents were subject to Genome-wide homozygosity mapping (a method that scans the whole genome for homozygous regions) followed by DHFR sequencing detected a novel homozygous variant in all affected siblings. The authors of a 2025 DHFR deficiency case study suggested that their findings indicate a need for early molecular diagnosis of newborns, given that they presented unexplained megaloblastic anemia, delayed development, or epilepsy.

=== Biochemical analysis ===
The diagnostic evaluation of DHFR deficiency often involves the biochemical analysis of folate concentrations and metabolite profiles within blood and cerebrospinal fluid. In one report, folate metabolite profiles in red blood cells, plasma (the liquid portion of blood), and cerebrospinal fluid were analyzed by liquid chromatography-tandem mass spectrometry (a technique that separates chemicals in a sample and detects them by mass) as part of the diagnostic evaluation. In another study, red blood cell folate components were measured by liquid chromatography-tandem mass spectrometry to evaluate the distribution of different folate forms during diagnostic assessment. Measurement of cerebrospinal-fluid folate metabolites, including 5-methyltetrahydrofolate, has been performed as part of the diagnostic assessment in several individuals. In some patients, cerebrospinal-fluid neurotransmitter metabolites and tetrahydrobiopterin-related compounds were also measured to assess associated monoamine and BH4 abnormalities.

=== Enzymatic activity assays ===
DHFR enzymatic activity has been assessed in Epstein-Barr virus-immortalized lymphoblastoid cell lines (a B lymphocyte that divides continuously due to Epstein-Barr virus infection) derived from affected individuals to determine if protein activity is impaired. In one study, DHFR activity in lymphoblastoid cells was quantified by measuring the formation of tetrahydrofolate from dihydrofolate using liquid chromatography-tandem mass spectrometry, and comparison of patient-derived and control cells in this assay was used to confirm reduced DHFR activity. Another report measured DHFR activity using fluorescein-labeled methotrexate binding (binding of methotrexate tagged with a fluorescein marker) in lymphoblastoid cells from affected siblings to assess substrate binding and DHFR function, as methotrexate can bind to the active site of DHFR.

=== Expression analysis ===
Reverse-transcription polymerase chain reaction (a method that converts RNA into DNA and amplifies it) of DHFR mRNA has been performed in lymphoblastoid cells from affected individuals and controls to assess the expression levels of DHFR mutant transcripts compared to control transcripts. Immunoblot analysis (a method that detects specific proteins in a sample) of fibroblasts (connective tissue cells) and Epstein-Barr virus-immortalized lymphoblastoid cells has been used to assess DHFR protein expression in affected individuals and heterozygous parents.

=== Functional characterization of DHFR variants ===
Functional evaluation of DHFR variants has been performed by transfecting cultured cells with expression constructs carrying wild type or mutant DHFR (introducing DNA into cells so they produce either the normal or the mutated DHFR protein). Protein levels in these cells have been examined by western blots (a method that detects specific proteins in a sample) and enzyme linked immunosorbent assay (a method that uses antibodies to measure protein amounts). Furthermore, a labeled ligand binding assay (an assay that detects binding between a labeled substrate and enzyme) has also been used to assess DHFR binding in transfected cells.

== Treatment and management ==
=== Folinic acid therapy ===
Folinic acid supplementation has been reported in several individuals with DHFR deficiency. Folinic acid was initiated in some individuals after cerebrospinal-fluid 5-methyltetrahydrofolate (biologically active form of folate) concentrations were found to be low or undetectable. In one report, anemia and pancytopenia (low count in all blood cell types) improved during folinic acid supplementation whereas severe developmental delay and other neurological features persisted.

In multiple individuals, cerebrospinal-fluid 5-methyltetrahydrofolate concentrations increased or normalized following folinic acid supplementation. In one affected infant, oral folinic acid at a dose of 30 mg daily was followed by improvement in anemia, seizure control, and cerebrospinal-fluid 5-methyltetrahydrofolate levels, while profound developmental delay with central hypotonia (low muscle tone from central nervous system dysfunction) and poor head control persisted. In another infant, folinic acid at 3 mg/kg per day was reported to improve neurological symptoms before death from severe pneumonia and respiratory failure. In three affected siblings, folinic acid at 1 mg/kg per day was reported to normalize cerebrospinal-fluid 5-methyltetrahydrofolate in two siblings and to increase red blood cell folate concentrations with normalization of mean corpuscular volume (a measure of red blood cell size) and bone-marrow morphology in all three.

In one previously asymptomatic sibling who received folinic acid irregularly, focal epilepsy (a form of epilepsy arising from a specific brain region) was reported three years later as the first neurological impairment. In one additional sibling, folinic acid therapy was followed by a period of transient independence from anticonvulsive medications (drugs used to prevent or control seizures) without additional neurological symptoms, and later irregular folinic acid supplementation was associated with recurrence of epileptic symptoms.

Clinical deterioration occurred in some infants despite improvements in hematologic or biochemical measures during folinic acid supplementation. One report described an affected infant with no detectable dihydrofolate-reductase activity who died in early infancy despite folinic acid supplementation and noted that earlier cases with residual activity had shown reported improvement. The same reported suggested that residual enzyme activity might relate to those responses while concluding that the overall effect of folinic acid supplementation remains uncertain.

=== Folic acid, vitamin B12, and hydroxocobalamin ===
In one infant, folic acid was started for megaloblastic anemia, and the anemia resolved with initially satisfactory neurodevelopmental progress before folic acid discontinuation was followed by status epilepticus (continuous or repeated seizures without return to consciousness). One patient with macrocytosis without anemia (enlarged red blood cells with a normal red blood cell count) and atypical absence epilepsy (epilepsy with slow, irregular episodes of impaired awareness and staring) was given folic acid at 5 mg per day, but their neurological symptoms persisted. Hydroxocobalamin was started in an affected infant after a working diagnosis of transcobalamin II deficiency, and the hematological profile remained unresponsive to this treatment. In another infant, neither vitamin B12 nor folic acid improved clinical or laboratory abnormalities.

=== Adjunctive therapies and acute management ===
In one infant with DHFR deficiency and Pneumocystis jirovecii infection, treatment included high-dose co-trimoxazole (an antibiotic combination used to treat bacterial and some opportunistic infections), prednisolone (a drug used to suppress inflammation and immune activity), extracorporeal membrane oxygenation (a technique that oxygenates blood outside the body), and intravenous folinic acid supplementation. The infant showed hematological recovery and extracorporeal membrane oxygenation support was discontinued, but later experienced a clinical deterioration and died despite receiving folinic acid therapy. The authors noted that high-dose co-trimoxazole treatment for Pneumocystis jirovecii infection may have affected the clinical course, because trimethoprim (one of the two antibiotics in co-trimoxazole) inhibits the dihydrofolate reductase enzyme, and they stated that a negative contribution of this treatment could not be excluded.

Anticonvulsant medications (drugs used to prevent or control seizures) have been used to manage seizures in several individuals. In one infant, phenobarbital treatment (drug used to control seizures) was reported to terminate seizures initially, but seizures recurred the following day and prompted further evaluation and introduction of folinic acid therapy. One infant had generalized and focal seizures (seizures that start in one area of the brain) that were unresponsive to phenytoin (anticonvulsant), benzodiazepines (a class of drugs used to stop or reduce seizures), and pyridoxine (vitamin B6, sometimes used to treat certain seizure types) before partial seizure control was achieved with phenobarbitone and levetiracetam (anticonvulsants).

=== Individuals without DHFR-specific treatment ===
Some individuals with DHFR deficiency have been described to not receive disease-specific treatment at the time of reporting. One patient with anemia and treatment-resistant seizures of undefined cause died in infancy before DHFR deficiency was recognized and before folinic acid supplementation was introduced in the family.

One report indicated that identifying and initiating treatment for the disorder early in development would result in a better prognosis, and for families with a history of DHFR deficiency, genetic counselling and prenatal screening were suggested.

== History ==
In 1967, there was a report of a patient with possible DHFR deficiency, but normal DHFR activity was found in the patient's fibroblasts later. In 1976, another two cases of Dihydrofolate Reductase Deficiency were described, but it was shown that one patient had methionine synthase reductase deficiency and the other had transcobalamin II deficiency. Before 2011, no molecularly confirmed cases of dihydrofolate reductase deficiency had been reported.

In 2011, three affected individuals of European descent were reported with two different pathogenic DHFR variants, and three affected siblings of British Pakistani origin were described in a separate study. In 2017, one affected German individual was identified. In 2022, three additional affected individuals from a Dutch pedigree were reported with homozygous DHFR variants. In 2025, two affected siblings of Chinese ancestry were described with compound-heterozygous DHFR variants.
