= Folate deficiency =

Abnormally low level of folate (vitamin B9) in the body

- Folic acid, a precursor of active B_{9}
- Specialty: Endocrinology
- Symptoms: Feeling tired, shortness of breath, changes in the color of the skin or hair, irritability
- Complications: Megaloblastic anemia, Anencephaly (offspring)
- Diagnostic method: Blood tests
- Treatment: Folic acid supplementation
- Frequency: Very rare (countries with fortification programs)

Folate deficiency, also known as vitamin B_{9} deficiency, is a low level of folate and derivatives in the body. This may result in megaloblastic anemia in which red blood cells become abnormally large, and folate deficiency anemia is the term given for this medical condition. Signs of folate deficiency are often subtle. Symptoms may include fatigue, heart palpitations, shortness of breath, feeling faint, open sores on the tongue, loss of appetite, changes in the color of the skin or hair, irritability, and behavioral changes. Temporary reversible infertility may occur. Folate deficiency anemia during pregnancy may give rise to the birth of low weight birth premature infants and infants with neural tube defects.

Not consuming enough folate can lead to folate deficiency within a few months. Otherwise, causes may include increased needs as with pregnancy, and in those with shortened red blood cell lifespan. Folate deficiency can be secondary to vitamin B_{12} deficiency or a defect in homocysteine methyl transferase that leads to a "folate trap" in which is an inactive metabolite that cannot be recovered. Diagnosis is typically confirmed by blood tests, including a complete blood count, and serum folate levels. Increased homocysteine levels may suggest deficiency state, but it is also affected by other factors. Vitamin B_{12} deficiency must be ruled out, if left untreated, may cause irreversible neurological damage.

Treatment may include dietary changes and folic acid supplements. Dietary changes including eating foods high in folate such as, fruits and green leafy vegetables can help. Prevention is recommended for pregnant women or those who are planning a pregnancy.

Folate deficiency is very rare in countries with folic acid fortification programs. Worldwide prevalence of anemia due to folic acid deficiency generally is very low.

== Signs and symptoms ==
Signs of folate deficiency anemia most of the time are subtle. Anemia (macrocytic, megaloblastic anemia) can be a sign of advanced folate deficiency in adults. Folate deficiency anemia may result in feeling tired, weakness, changes to the color of the skin or hair, open sores on the mouth, shortness of breath, palpitations, lightheadedness, cold hands and feet, headaches, easy bleeding or bruising, low-grade fevers, loss of appetite, weight loss, diarrhea, decreased taste, irritability, and behavioral disorders.

Women with folate deficiency who become pregnant are more likely to give birth to low birth weight premature infants, and infants with neural tube defects and even spina bifida. In infants and children, folate deficiency can lead to failure to thrive or slow growth rate, diarrhea, oral ulcers, megaloblastic anemia, neurological deterioration. An abnormally small head, irritability, developmental delay, seizures, blindness and cerebellar ataxia can also be observed.

== Causes ==
A deficiency of folate can occur when the body's need for folate is increased, when dietary intake or absorption of folate is inadequate, or when the body excretes (or loses) more folate than usual. Medications that interfere with the body's ability to use folate may also increase the need for this vitamin. Some research indicates that exposure to ultraviolet light, including the use of tanning beds, can lead to a folate deficiency. The deficiency is more common in pregnant women, infants, children, and adolescents. It may also be due to poor diet or a consequence of alcoholism.

Additionally, a defect in homocysteine methyltransferase or a deficiency of vitamin B_{12} may lead to a so-called "methyl-trap" of tetrahydrofolate (THF), in which THF is converted to a reservoir of methyl-THF which thereafter has no way of being metabolized, and serves as a sink of THF that causes a subsequent deficiency in folate. Thus, a deficiency in B_{12} can generate a large pool of methyl-THF that is unable to undergo reactions and will mimic folate deficiency.

Folate (pteroylmonoglutamate) is absorbed throughout the small intestine, though mainly in the jejunum. Important steps in the absorption are reduction of the polyglutamate chain by pteroylpolyglutamate hydrolase (gamma-glutamyl hydrolase) and then transport across the brush border membrane by the proton-coupled folate transporter (SLC46A1). Diffuse inflammatory or degenerative diseases of the small intestine, such as Crohn's disease, celiac disease, chronic enteritis or the presence of an entero-enteric fistula may reduce absorption.

=== Situational ===
Some situations that increase the need for folate include:

- bleeding
- kidney dialysis
- liver disease
- malabsorption, including celiac disease and fructose malabsorption
- pregnancy and lactation (breastfeeding)
- tobacco smoking
- alcohol consumption

=== Medication ===
Medications can interfere with folate metabolism, including:

- anticonvulsant medications (such as phenytoin, primidone, carbamazepine or valproate)
- metformin (sometimes prescribed to control blood sugar in type 2 diabetes)
- methotrexate, an anti-cancer drug also used to control inflammation associated with Crohn's disease, ulcerative colitis and rheumatoid arthritis.
- 5-fluorouracil
- hydroxyurea
- trimethoprim
- sulfasalazine (used to control inflammation associated with Crohn's disease, ulcerative colitis, and rheumatoid arthritis)
- triamterene (a diuretic)
- birth control pills (also related to the duration use of birth control pills) may reduce serum folate levels but without inducing clinically significant folate deficiency.

When methotrexate is prescribed, folic acid supplements are sometimes given with the methotrexate. The therapeutic effects of methotrexate are due to its inhibition of dihydrofolate reductase and thereby reduce the rate de novo purine and pyrimidine synthesis and cell division. Methotrexate inhibits cell division and is particularly toxic to fast dividing cells, such as rapidly dividing cancer cells and the progenitor cells of the immune system. Folate supplementation is beneficial in patients being treated with long-term, low-dose methotrexate for inflammatory conditions, such as rheumatoid arthritis (RA) or psoriasis, to avoid macrocytic anemia caused by folate deficiency. Folate is often also supplemented before some high dose chemotherapy treatments in an effort to protect healthy tissue. However, it may be counterproductive to take a folic acid supplement with methotrexate in cancer treatment.

=== Cerebral folate deficiency ===
Cerebral folate deficiency is when levels of 5-methyltetrahydrofolate are low in the brain as measured in the cerebral spinal fluid despite being normal in the blood. Symptoms typically appear at about five months of age. Without treatment there may be poor muscle tone, trouble with coordination, trouble talking, and seizures. The causes of cerebral folate deficiency include mutations of genes responsible for folate metabolism and transport. Mutations of the SLC46A1 gene that encodes the proton-coupled folate transporter (PCFT) result in CFD syndromes with both systemic folate deficiency and cerebral folate deficiency. Even when the systemic deficiency is corrected by folate, the cerebral deficiency remains and must be treated with folinic acid.

=== Pregnancy ===
Folate deficiency can occur during pregnancy as a result of the increasing number of cells of the growing fetus, decreased absorption and intake of folate, maternal hormones that mediate its metabolism, vascular circulation of maternal and fetal blood and an increasing amount of blood resulting in dilution. Sickle cell anemia and living in areas of malaria result in even higher folate needs for women who are pregnant. When supplemented with 450 micrograms of folic acid per day, the risk of developing birth defects, specifically neural tube defects, is decreased. Supplementation to prevent birth defects is most effective one month prior to and during the first twelve weeks of pregnancy. Utilization of folic acid supplementation before conception has shown to result in a decrease in neural tube defects by 70%.

== Diagnosis ==
Folate deficiency is diagnosed with a blood test to measure the serum level of folate, measured as methyltetrahydrofolate (in practice, "folate" refers to all derivatives of folic acid, but methylhydrofolate is the quasi unique form of "folate" in the blood).

Homocysteine is elevated (5-MTHF is used to convert homocysteine to methionine) as in vitamin B_{12} deficiency, whereas methylmalonic acid is normal (elevated in vitamin B_{12} deficiency).

More specifically, according to a 2014 UK guideline,

- A serum folate level of less than 7 nmol/L (3 μg/L) is indicative of folate deficiency;
- Red blood cell folate testing is not routinely performed, since serum folate is sufficient in most cases, however, if there is a strong suspicion of folate deficiency despite a normal serum folate level, a red cell folate test may be performed.
- Plasma total homocysteine is only measured in special circumstances. A level above 15 μmol/L could be indicative of a folate deficiency, but local reference ranges should be taken into account.

== Management ==
=== Diet ===
Folate is acquired in the diet by the consumption of leafy green vegetables, legumes and organ meats. When cooking, use of steaming, a food steamer, or a microwave oven can help keep more folate content in the cooked foods.

=== Supplementation ===
Folic acid is a synthetic derivative of folate and is acquired by dietary supplementation. Multi-vitamin dietary supplements contain folic acid as well as other B vitamins. Non-prescription folic acid is available as a dietary supplement in some countries, and some countries require the fortification of wheat flour, corn meal or rice with folic acid with the intention of promoting public health through increasing blood folate levels in the population.

=== Fortification ===
After the discovery of the link between insufficient folic acid and neural tube defects, governments and health organizations worldwide made recommendations concerning folic acid supplementation for women intending to become pregnant. Because the neural tube closes in the first four weeks of gestation, often before many women even know they are pregnant, many countries in time decided to implement mandatory food fortification programs. A meta-analysis of global birth prevalence of spina bifida showed that when mandatory fortification was compared to countries with healthcare professionals advising women but no mandatory fortification program, there was a 30% reduction in live births with spina bifida, with some countries reported a greater than 50% reduction.

Over 80 countries require folic acid fortification in some foods. Fortification of rice is common. The USDA has required the fortification of flour since 1998. Since then, Hispanics in the United States have seen the greatest reduction of neural tube defects. Canada has mandated folic acid fortification of flour since 1998 which has resulted in a 42% decrease in neural tube defects. Fortification of wheat and corn flour, milk and rice is required in Costa Rica which has led to a reduction of neural tube defects of as much as 60%.

== Epidemiology ==
Folate deficiency is very rare in countries with folic acid fortification programs. Overall, the worldwide prevalence of anemia due to folic acid deficiency is very low. However, data on the prevalence of deficiency amongst specific high risk groups is lacking.

== Research ==
Folate deficiency during gestation or infancy due to development by the fetus or infant of autoantibodies to the folate receptor might result in various developmental disorders.

Studies suggest that insufficient folate and vitamin B_{12} status may contribute to major depressive disorder and that supplementation might be useful in this condition. The role of vitamin B_{12} and folate in depression is due to their role in transmethylation reactions, which are crucial for the formation of neurotransmitters (e.g. serotonin, epinephrine, nicotinamides, purines, phospholipids). The proposed mechanism, is that low levels of folate or vitamin B_{12} can disrupt transmethylation reaction, leading to an accumulation of homocysteine (hyperhomocysteinemia) and to impaired metabolism of neurotransmitters (especially the hydroxylation of dopamine and serotonin from tyrosine and tryptophan), phospholipids, myelin, and receptors. High homocysteine levels in the blood can lead to vascular injuries by oxidative mechanisms which can contribute to cerebral dysfunction. All of these can lead to the development of various disorders, including depression.
