= Macrocytic =

Macrocytic may refer to:

- macrocytosis
- macrocytic anemia
