= Delayed milestone =

Child is late reaching development stages

- Other names: Developmental delays
- Specialty: Pediatrics

A delayed milestone, which is also known as a developmental delay, refers to a situation where a child does not reach a particular developmental milestone at the expected age. Developmental milestones refer to a collection of indicators that a child is anticipated to reach as they grow older.

Each age group has its distinct set of milestones, representing behaviors that develop gradually and serve as foundational building blocks for growth and ongoing learning. These behavioral milestones fall into various categories of child development stages, including:

- Adaptive skills: Activities of daily living, such as putting on clothes, eating, and washing independently.
- Cognition and intellect: Involves thinking, solving problems, making judgements and comprehension.
- Emotional expression: Includes facial movements, such as a smile when happy, or an action, such as giving a gift to express gratitude
- Language: Being able to communicate verbally with speech and/or nonverbally with gesture
- Motor coordination: Encompasses both gross and fine motor skills, such as jumping and drawing.
- Sensory: Vision, hearing, touch, taste, smell
- Social interaction: Involves the ability to initiate contact with peers and engage in group play.

== Epidemiology ==
Developmental delay is prevalent in approximately 1-3% of children under the age of 5 worldwide. According to a systematic analysis done for a conducted study in 2016, there are approximately 52.9 million children worldwide under the age of 5 that are affected by some type of developmental delay or delayed milestone. For example, the prevalence of autism spectrum disorders was estimated to be 2.64%. 95% of the children with these delayed milestones live in countries with low to middle income and have very limited availability of healthcare resources. There is a risk of having a delayed milestone if a child live in an under-resourced nation.

== Causes ==
Delayed milestones can manifest as early as infancy and develop later in early school years. Many factors contribute to delayed milestone such as medications, trauma, environmental, genetics, and metabolic and there are some cases where delayed milestones are idiopathic.

=== Anti-epileptic medications ===
One cause of delayed milestone is the use of anti-epileptic medications such as valproate during pregnancy. According to the study, there is an association between prenatal exposure to valproate and delayed milestones and intellectual disabilities. The risk of children having delayed developmental milestones is significantly higher compared to children without valproate exposure. Pregnant women taking higher doses of valproate have a higher risk of intellectual disabilities and delayed milestones compared to lower doses.

Other anti-epileptic medications such as carbamazepine, clonazepam, and oxcarbazepine have been associated with an increased risk of developmental milestones in children while exposed prenatally.

=== Parental violence and psychological distress ===
Children exposed to intimate partner violence have been associated with delayed milestones along with long term physical and mental health adverse effects. Trauma and toxic stress that stems from intimate partner violence interferes with the normal developmental processes of the brain.

Parental psychological distress such (PPD) as anxiety and depression have been associated with delayed milestones. PPD interferes with healthy attachment between parent and child which increases the risk of the child having behavioral and cognitive problems.

The Child Health Improvement through Computer Automation (CHICA) system measured developmental milestones under 4 domains: personal-social, language, fine motor-adaptive, and gross motor. According to the study, children exposed to intimate partner violence and parental psychological distress within the first 6 years of a child's life failed all 4 developmental domains of developmental milestones.

=== Antidepressants ===
Women taking antidepressants while pregnant may lead to delayed milestones in their child as well as reversible or permanent effects on fetal development. The occurrence of delayed milestone in children depends on the timing of exposure to antidepressants during pregnancy. Studies shown that children who were exposed to antidepressants during the second or third trimester of pregnancy were able to sit and walk later than children that were not exposed to antidepressants, however were still in the normal range of development. Fewer children took as long as 6 months to sit without support while some took even 19 months to support themselves.

== Diagnosis ==
Currently, there is no consensus on a general diagnostic pathway and specific tests to approach the diagnosis of developmental delay in children. Keeping the child development stages or milestones in mind, closely monitoring these social-emotional, cognitive, behavioral and motor-sensory milestones can provide important clues about a child's overall development. The Centers for Disease Prevention and Control (CDC) program "Learn the Signs. Act Early" provides materials for parents to reference and keep track of child development at specified milestones starting from two months old up to five years of age. If there are any missed milestones that may be a concern for the parent, these materials can help initiate a conversation with the primary care physician and assign the child with more specific testing to assess the child's developmental progress. Identifying and addressing early signs, symptoms, and risk factors of developmental delay in children with an effective management strategy have shown an overall positive improvement in cognitive and academic performance and outcomes. Significant delays in one or more of the defined child developmental milestones is typically diagnosed by the primary care physician as a delayed milestone or as global developmental delay.

=== Assessment ===
Assessment of developmental progress involves a combination of surveillance, screening tools, and other points to take into consideration:

- Developmental Surveillance: Monitoring that is performed once any risk factors and/or symptoms for developmental delay have been identified in a child, surveillance will be used at subsequent well-child visits with the primary care physician. Attentive supervision through surveillance footage alongside an age-appropriate milestone checklist to document observations will help gain a better understanding of the child's overall developmental progress and confirm a potential diagnosis following discussion of the findings with parents.
- Screening Tools: Utilized when a child is identified to have a potential risk for developmental delay with no identified symptoms at a regularly scheduled well-child visit. Assigned by the primary care physician, these validated tests may include an Ages and Stages Questionnaire, Child Development Review - Parent Questionnaire, and Parents' Evaluation of Developmental Status. Each of these tests differ in terms of whether the screener is completed by the child or the parent, sensitivity, specificity, the age range assigned, and the time to complete and generate a score.
- Genetics: With proper informed consent, obtaining a family history is an important factor to include in the diagnostic process for a child presenting with symptoms and/or missed milestones. An identified genetic risk factor or cause can be used to determine a more specific approach to address any documented delayed milestones. Genetic testing is the first line approach if a child (less than 5 years old) has no identified external factor(s) contributing to delayed milestone. It is more efficient and cost effective to perform comprehensive evaluations with the available diagnostic screening tools prior to investigations in cases without an identified external factor or genetic cause for the child's delayed milestone.
- Physical Examination: Completed at all scheduled well-child visits, examining the growth parameters, such as head circumference and body mass index (BMI), are within range can help ensure proper child growth development.
- Neuroimaging: Performed when a child's medical history or physical examination suggests that the presenting symptoms stem from the brain, which may further imply an underlying neurological diagnosis causing any observed delayed milestones to occur. Since performing brain imaging is not standard practice for diagnosing developmental delay in children, the imaging results alone are insufficient to affirm that any delayed milestones are due to any potential brain abnormalities observed through brain imaging procedures. If any brain abnormalities are observed with neuroimaging, further investigation may be pursued to determine the potential underlying cause for any missed milestones in child development. There currently are no specified guidelines or recommendations indicating that computed tomography (CT) or magnetic resonance imaging (MRI) is required to evaluate a child with any missed milestones in child development.

=== Current guidelines ===
There are three U.S. organizations that provide varying recommendations in terms of when and how to screen children for developmental delays in children below the age of five, including the U.S. Preventative Services Task Force (USPSTF), Canadian Task Force on Preventative Health Care, and the American Academy of Pediatrics (AAP). The USPSTF provides limited information on developmental delay as a whole since it only screens for communication delays and autism, specifically speech and language. Due to lack of evidence supporting asymptomatic children benefitting from repeated early screening and surveillance at well-child visits before the age of five, the USPSTF does not recommend screening for communication delays for children showing no symptoms of developmental delay. Additionally, if there are no concerns by the parent or pediatrician in terms of any developmental delays, then the Canadian Task Force on Preventative Health Care also does not recommend screening asymptomatic children before the age of five with surveillance and screening tools. On the other hand, the AAP does have specific recommendations for developmental and autism screening regardless of the child showing any delayed milestones or not.

== Clinical approach ==
=== Biotinidase deficiency ===
Biotinidase deficiency is an inherited disorder that affects how the body is able to process biotin. People will be diagnosed for biotinidase deficiency before they start showing symptoms. The symptoms presented include developmental delay, hair loss, seizures, and skin rash. Treatment for biotinidase deficiency is biotin supplementation therapy every day. The treatment demonstrated developmental delay improvement within weeks of therapy.

=== Human Immunodeficiency virus (HIV) ===
A risk factor for delayed milestones are infants that have direct contact with their mother's fluids who are HIV positive or suspected and become infected. There is improvement with developmental milestones for infected infants treated by antiretroviral therapy compared to infected infants who are not. Important to note, infected infants treated for HIV demonstrated delayed milestones compared to infants who are not infected with HIV.

=== Inherited metabolism disorder ===
There are children with inherited metabolism disorders that can be treated to help improve development. According to the study, treatments included the following types of therapies:

- bone marrow and hematopoietic stem cell transplant: used to treat Lesch-Nyhan syndrome
- co-factor/-enzyme: Q10, a co-enzyme involved in the formation of energy, was found to be deficient.
- dietary restrictions/supplement: a deficiency in dihydrofolate reductase was treated through oral folinic acid supplements
- enzyme replacement: replacing enzymes, proteins that increases the rate of reactions in the body.
- gene: a unit composed of nucleotides passed from parent to child
- substrate inhibitions: blocking small molecules from acting in the human body
- substrate reduction: reducing the activity of small molecules in the human body
- Vitamin: B12 and folate tests confirmed deficiencies that resulted in Congenital intrinsic factor deficiency and Imerslund Gräsbeck syndrome.

=== Language and speech ===
Many children have different forms of language and speech disorders, which can be classified as primary disorder or disorders secondary to known conditions. Secondary and tertiary prevention can be detected if the child has other health conditions such as autism, cleft palate, global developmental delay and intellectual disability, hearing loss, known genetic variation, neurological disorder, or other health conditions. The treatment for children with language and speech delay is a speech language pathologist. Speech and language therapy has demonstrated improvement in some disorders, but not all.

=== Physiotherapy ===
A risk factor for delayed milestones is premature birth. The case study of a child born prematurely demonstrated improvement in developmental milestones with the use of physiotherapy.

=== Recurrent depletion ===
Recurrent depletion is when there are different findings that do not match with any recognizable syndrome. Recurrent depletion is mostly passed down from the parent to the child. The treatment for recurrent depletion is treating the specific clinical findings that the person has. People with developmental delays were treated with developmental therapies and specific learning styles.
