= THF (disambiguation) =

THF may refer to:

- Tetrahydrofuran
- Tetrahydrofolate
- Tremendously high frequency
- Trust House Forte, a UK-based hotel and catering group
- THF, the former IATA airport code for Tempelhof International Airport
