= Caprin-2 =

Protein found in humans

CAPRIN2

Identifiers
- Aliases: CAPRIN2, C1QDC1, EEG-1, EEG1, RNG140, caprin family member 2
- External IDs: OMIM: 610375; MGI: 2448541; GeneCards: CAPRIN2
Available structures
PDB	Ortholog search: PDBe RCSB
PDB	List of PDB id codes 4OUL, 4OUM

Gene location (Human)
Chr.	Chromosome 12 (human)
Band	12p11.21	Start	30,709,552 bp
Band	12p11.21	End	30,754,951 bp

Gene location (Mouse)
Chr.	Chromosome 6 (mouse)
Band	6|6 G3	Start	148,743,990 bp
Band	6|6 G3	End	148,797,735 bp
RNA expression pattern
Bgee	Human / Mouse (ortholog); Top expressed in: spinal ganglia; cerebellar vermis; right hemisphere of cerebellum; trigeminal ganglion; testicle; sural nerve; lateral nuclear group of thalamus; pars compacta; pars reticulata; external globus pallidus / Top expressed in: lens; epithelium of lens; zygote; primary oocyte; secondary oocyte; tail of embryo; neural layer of retina; lumbar spinal ganglion; supraoptic nucleus; paraventricular nucleus of hypothalamus; More reference expression data
BioGPS	n/a
Gene ontology
Molecular function	signaling receptor binding; protein binding; RNA binding; metal ion binding
Cellular component	centrosome; receptor complex; nucleus; mitochondrion; cytoplasm; cytosol; plasma membrane; membrane
Biological process	positive regulation of canonical Wnt signaling pathway; regulation of growth; cell differentiation; negative regulation of translation; positive regulation of protein binding; negative regulation of cell growth; positive regulation of peptidyl-serine phosphorylation; positive regulation of transcription by RNA polymerase II; positive regulation of dendrite morphogenesis; positive regulation of dendritic spine morphogenesis
Sources:Amigo / QuickGO
Orthologs
Databases	NCBI: entry; OMA: entry
Species	Human	Mouse
Entrez	65981	232560
Ensembl	ENSG00000110888	ENSMUSG00000030309
UniProt	Q6IMN6	Q05A80
RefSeq (mRNA)	NM_001002259; NM_001206856; NM_023925; NM_032156; NM_001319842 NM_001319843; NM_001319844; NM_001319845; NM_001319846	NM_001301351; NM_181541
RefSeq (protein)	NP_001002259; NP_001193785; NP_001306771; NP_001306772; NP_001306773 NP_001306774; NP_001306775; NP_076414; NP_115532	NP_001288280; NP_853519
Location (UCSC)	Chr 12: 30.71 – 30.75 Mb	Chr 6: 148.74 – 148.8 Mb
PubMed search
- Wikidata
View/Edit Human	View/Edit Mouse

Caprin-2 is a protein that in humans is encoded by the gene CAPRIN2.

Caprin-2 may be involved in the transitioning of erythroblasts from a highly proliferative state to a terminal phase of differentiation. High level expression of the encoded protein can lead to apoptosis. Several transcript variants encoding different isoforms have been found for CAPRIN2.
