= Nucleated red blood cell =

Red blood cell with a cell nucleus

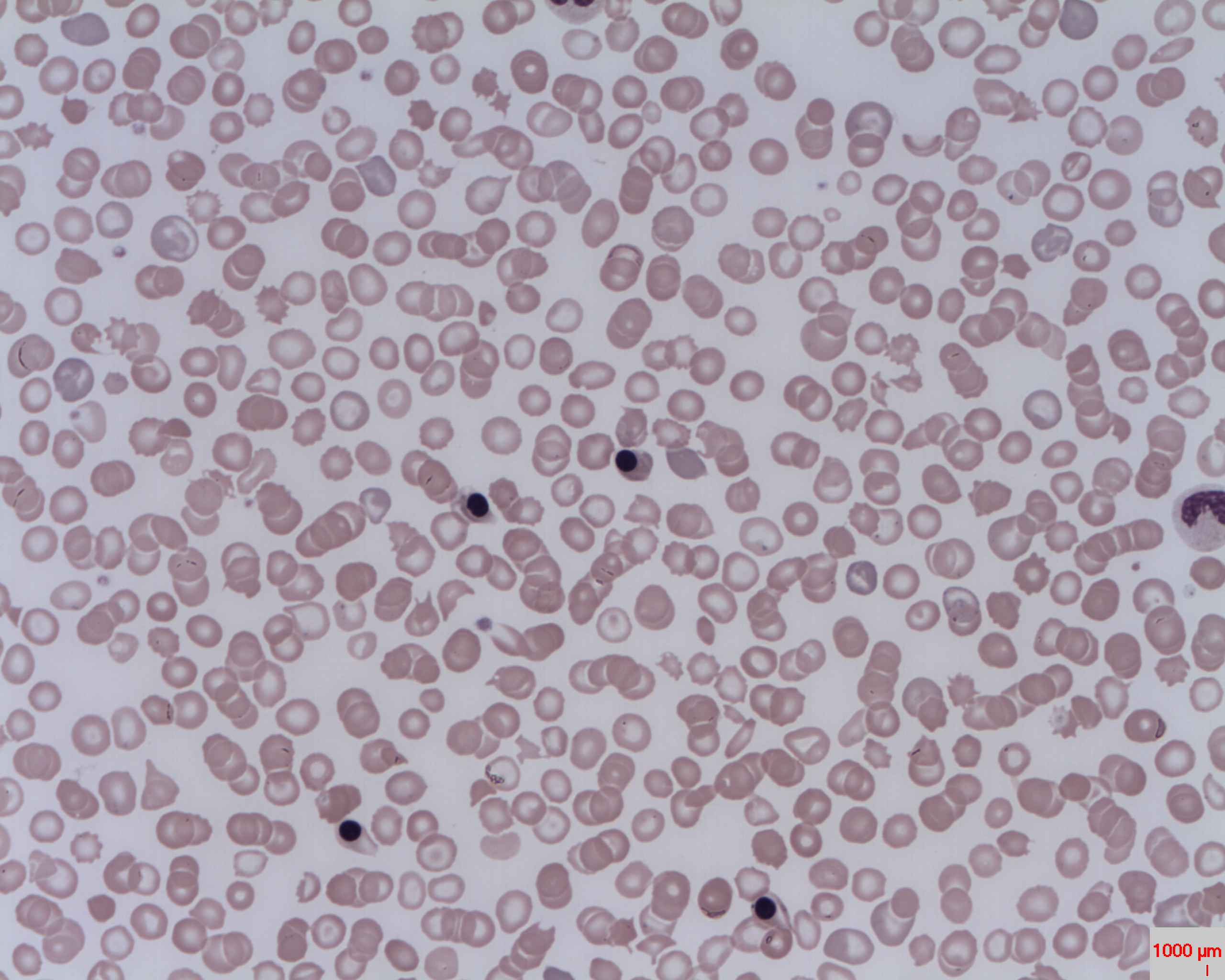
A human peripheral blood smear; NRBCs are visible as larger cells with dark centers.

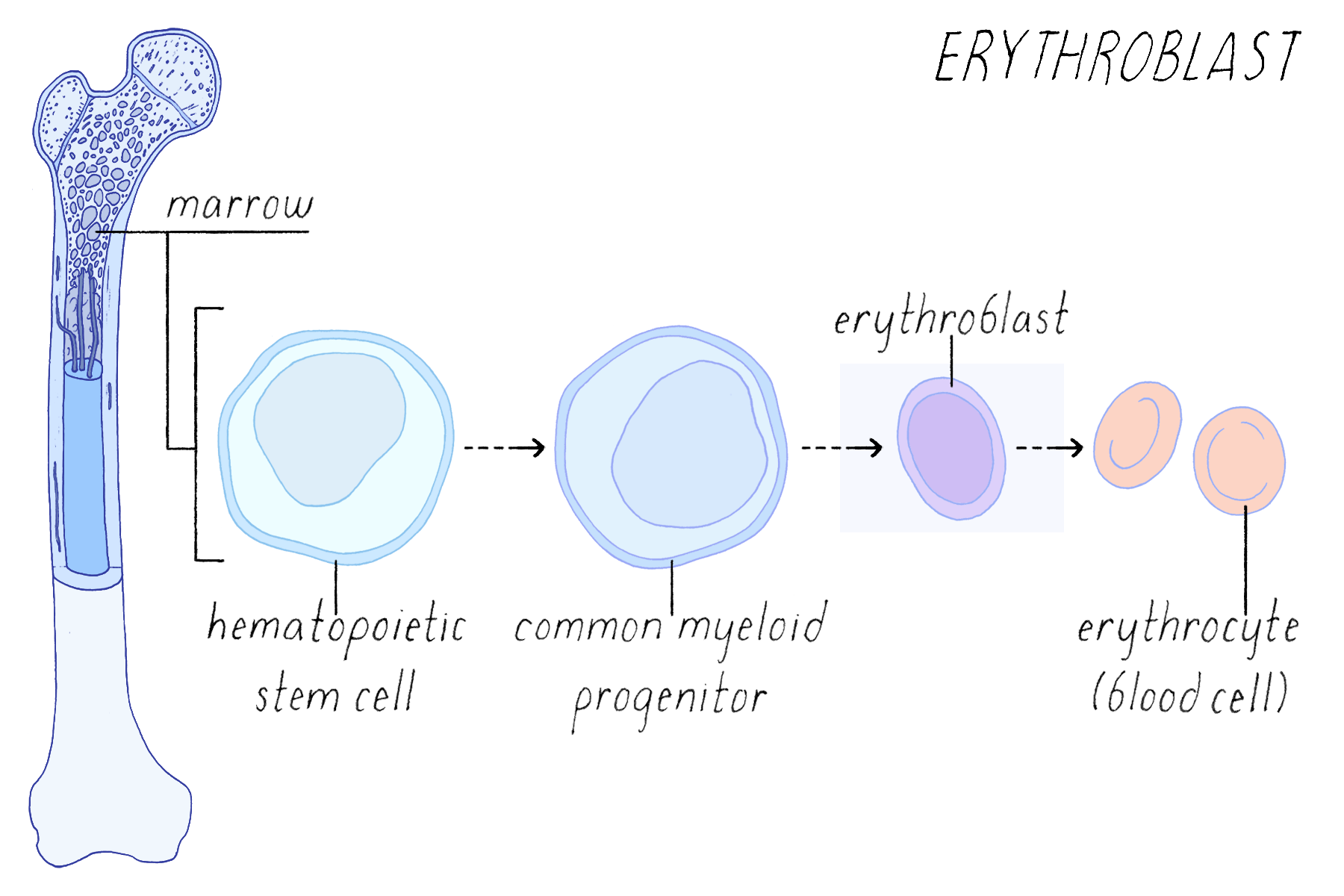
An immature red blood cell (erythroblast) contains a nucleus, unlike a mature red blood cell.

A nucleated red blood cell (NRBC), also known by several other names, is a red blood cell that contains a cell nucleus. Almost all vertebrate organisms have hemoglobin-containing cells in their blood, and with the exception of mammals, all of these red blood cells are nucleated. In mammals, NRBCs occur in normal development as precursors to mature red blood cells in erythropoiesis, the process by which the body produces red blood cells.

NRBCs are normally found in the bone marrow of humans of all ages and in the blood of fetuses and newborn infants. After infancy, RBCs normally contain a nucleus only during the very early stages of the cell's life, and the nucleus is ejected as a normal part of cellular differentiation before the cell is released into the bloodstream. The presence of circulating NRBCs in adults occurs in situations of hematopoietic stress such as severe infection, massive hemorrhage, marrow infiltration, or extramedullary hematopoiesis. That is, if NRBCs are identified on an adult's complete blood count or peripheral blood smear, it suggests that there is a very high demand for the bone marrow to produce RBCs, and immature RBCs are being released into circulation. Possible pathologic causes include anemia, myelofibrosis, thalassemia, miliary tuberculosis, cancers involving bone marrow (myelomas, leukemias, lymphomas), and in chronic hypoxemia.

== Nomenclature ==
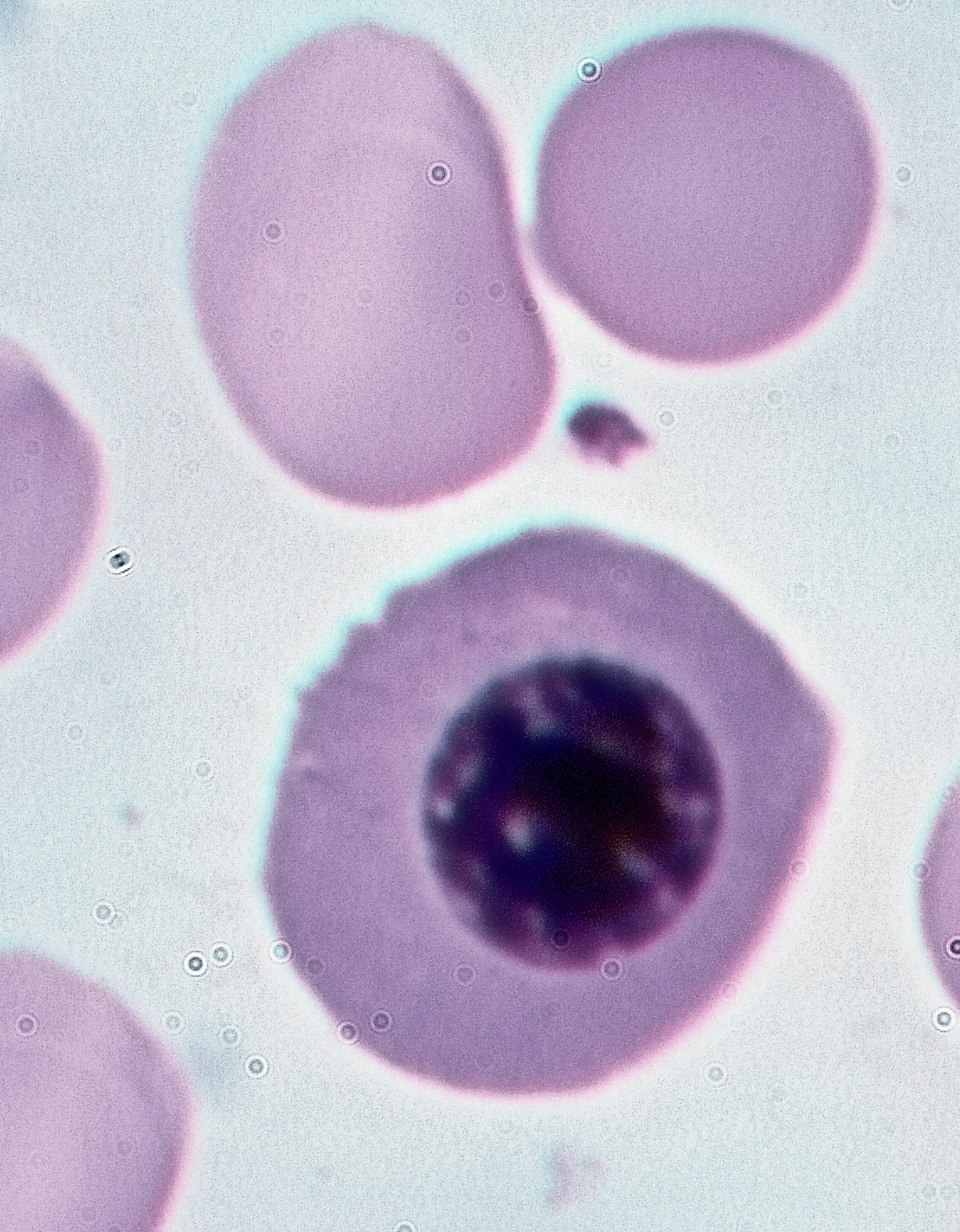
Normocyte, Giemsa stain

Several names are used for nucleated RBCs—erythroblast, normoblast, and megaloblast—with one minor variation in word sense. The name normoblast always refers to normal, healthy cells that are the immediate precursors of normal, healthy, mature (anucleate) RBCs. The name megaloblast always refers to abnormally developed precursors. Often the name erythroblast is used synonymously with normoblast, but at other times it is considered a hypernym. In the latter sense, there are two types of erythroblasts: normoblasts as cells that develop as expected, and megaloblasts as unusually large erythroblasts that are associated with illness.

== Healthy development ==
There are four stages in the normal development of a normoblast.

Illustration	Description	Image
	Pronormoblast	
	Basophilic normoblast	
	Polychromatic normoblast (also polychromatophilic)	
	Orthochromatic normoblast (also orthochromatophilic)	

== Pathogenesis ==
A megaloblast is an unusually large erythroblast that can be associated with vitamin B_{12} deficiency (caused by pernicious anemia or dietary insufficiency), folic acid deficiency, or both (such anemias are collectively called megaloblastic anemias). This kind of anemia leads to macrocytes (abnormally large red cells) and the condition called macrocytosis. The cause of this cellular gigantism is an impairment in DNA replication that delays nuclear maturation and cell division. Because RNA and cytoplasmic elements are synthesized at a constant rate despite the cells' impaired DNA synthesis, the cells show nuclear-cytoplasmic asynchrony.

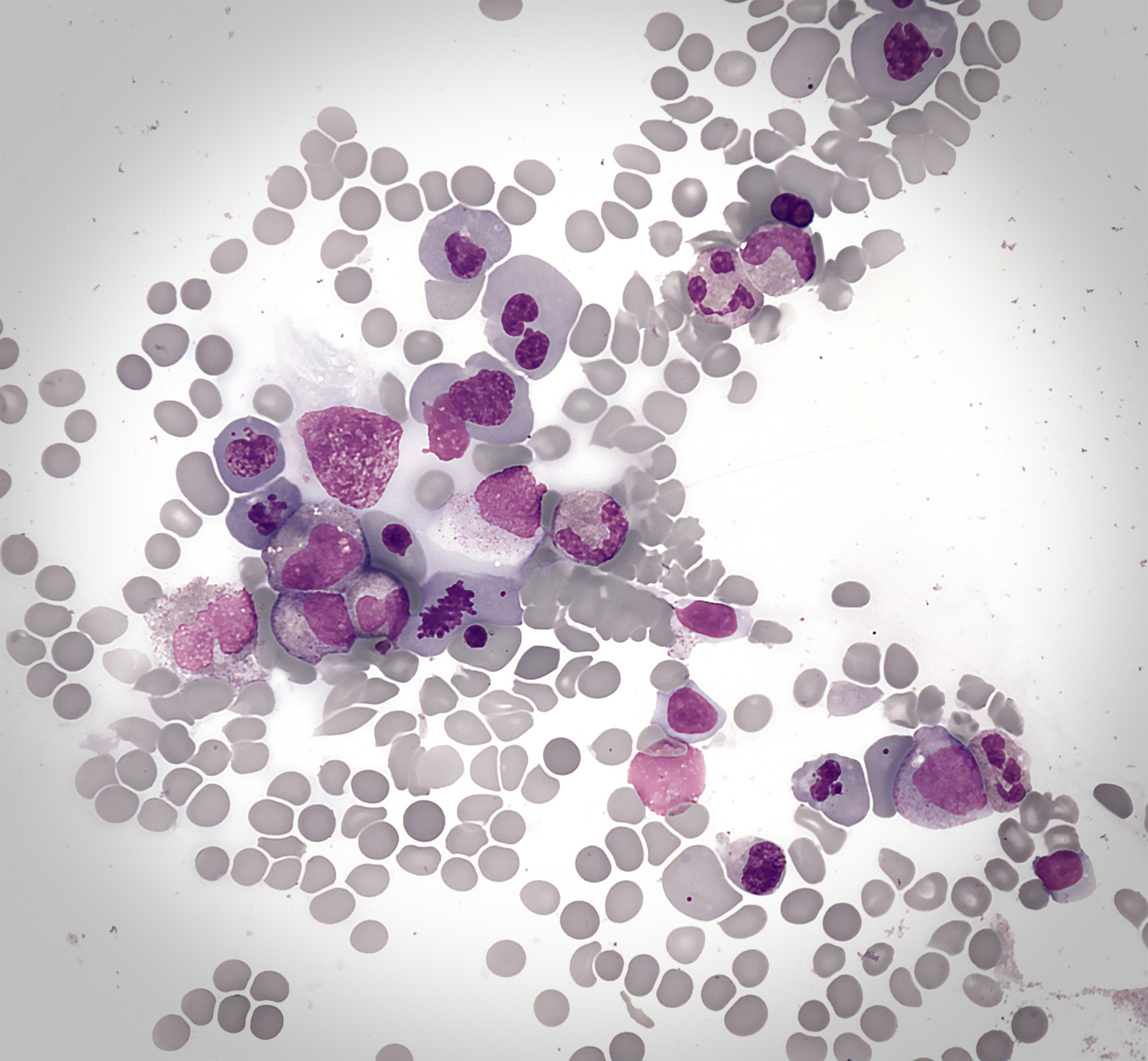
Megaloblasts of various stages of maturation in bone marrow smears. May-Grunwald staining (x400)

== Additional images ==
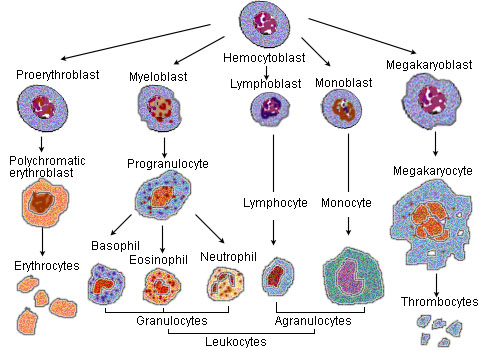
Blood cell lineage

Hematopoiesis

== See also ==
- Erythropoiesis
- Haematopoiesis
- Hematopoietic stem cell
