= Hypersegmented neutrophil =

Unusual presence of neutrophils

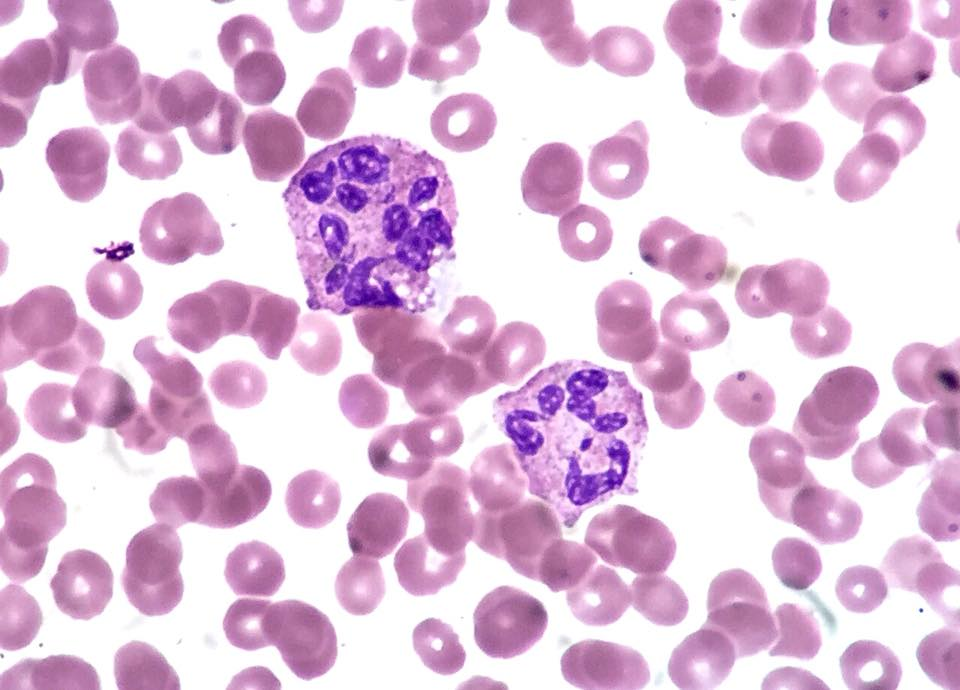
- Blood smear with two hypersegmented neutrophils.

Neutrophil hypersegmentation can be defined as the presence of neutrophils whose nuclei have six or more lobes or the presence of more than 3% of neutrophils with at least five nuclear lobes. This is a clinical laboratory finding. It is visualized by drawing blood from a patient and viewing the blood smeared on a slide under a microscope. Normal neutrophils are uniform in size, with an apparent diameter of about 13 μm in a film. When stained, neutrophils have a segmented nucleus and pink/orange cytoplasm under light microscope. The majority of neutrophils have three nuclear segments (lobes) connected by tapering chromatin strands. A small percentage have four lobes, and occasionally five lobes may be seen. Up to 8% of circulating neutrophils are unsegmented (‘band’ forms).

The presence of hypersegmented neutrophils is an important diagnostic feature of megaloblastic anaemias. Hypersegmentation can also be seen in many other conditions, but with relatively less diagnostic significance.

Hypersegmentation can sometimes be difficult to assert, as inter-rater reliability of lobe count is poor, and as expected levels of segmentation may vary with race. A 1996 study performed in the United States found that neutrophil segmentation was higher among people of black ancestry than other groups tested.

== Association with other diseases ==
=== Megaloblastic anemia ===
Neutrophil hypersegmentation is one of the earliest, most sensitive and specific signs of megaloblastic anemia (mainly caused by hypovitaminosis of vitamin B12 & folic acid). Nuclear hypersegmentation of DNA in neutrophils strongly suggests megaloblastosis when associated with macro-ovalocytosis. If megaloblastosis is suspected, a formal lobe count/neutrophil (i.e. lobe index) above 3.5% can be obtained. Hypersegmentation persists for an average of 14 days after institution of specific therapy.

=== Other causes ===
- Hereditary hypersegmentation
- Acute megaloblastic anaemia secondary to nitrous oxide anaesthesia
- Myelodysplastic syndrome (MDS)
- Myeloproliferative disorders
  - Chronic myelogenous leukemia (CML)
- Chronic infections
- Chemotherapeutic & Cytotoxic drugs
  - 5-fluorouracil
  - Hydroxyurea
  - Hydroxycarbamide
  - Methotrexate
- Following Granulocyte colony stimulating Factor (G-CSF) administration
- Steroid therapy for immune thrombocytopenic purpura (ITP)
- Iron deficiency anaemia
