= Trimethoprim =

Antibiotic

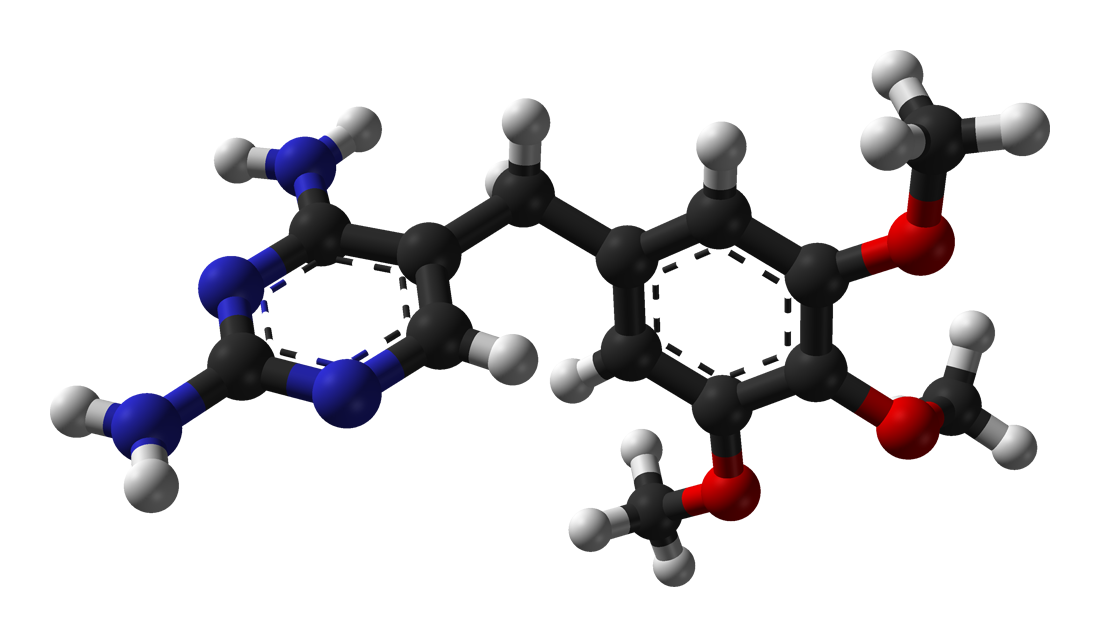

Clinical data
- Pronunciation: /traɪˈmɛθəprɪm/
- Trade names: Proloprim, Monotrim, Triprim, others
- AHFS/Drugs.com: Monograph
- MedlinePlus: a684025
- License data: US DailyMed: Trimethoprim
- Pregnancy category: AU: B3
- Routes of administration: By mouth
- Drug class: Diaminopyrimidines
- ATC code: J01EA01 (WHO) QJ51EA01 (WHO)

Legal status
- Legal status: AU: S4 (Prescription only); CA: ℞-only; UK: POM (Prescription only); US: ℞-only

Pharmacokinetic data
- Bioavailability: 90–100%
- Protein binding: 44%
- Metabolism: Liver
- Elimination half-life: 8–12 hours
- Excretion: Kidney (50–60%), faeces (4%)

Identifiers
- IUPAC name: 5-(3,4,5-Trimethoxybenzyl)pyrimidine-2,4-diamine
- CAS Number: 738-70-5
- PubChem CID: 5578
- DrugBank: DB00440
- ChemSpider: 5376
- UNII: AN164J8Y0X
- KEGG: D00145
- ChEBI: CHEBI:45924
- ChEMBL: ChEMBL22
- PDB ligand: TOP (PDBe, RCSB PDB)
- CompTox Dashboard (EPA): DTXSID3023712
- ECHA InfoCard: 100.010.915

Chemical and physical data
- Formula: C_{14}H_{18}N_{4}O_{3}
- Molar mass: 290.323 g·mol^{−1}
- 3D model (JSmol): Interactive image
- SMILES: Nc1nc(N)ncc1Cc(cc2OC)cc(OC)c2OC
- InChI: InChI=1S/C14H18N4O3/c1-19-10-5-8(6-11(20-2)12(10)21-3)4-9-7-17-14(16)18-13(9)15/h5-7H,4H2,1-3H3,(H4,15,16,17,18); Key:IEDVJHCEMCRBQM-UHFFFAOYSA-N

Trimethoprim (TMP) is an antibiotic used mainly in the treatment of bladder infections. Other uses include for middle ear infections and travellers' diarrhoea. With sulfamethoxazole or dapsone it may be used for Pneumocystis pneumonia in people with HIV/AIDS. It is taken orally (swallowed by mouth).

Common side effects include nausea, changes in taste, and rash. Rarely it may result in blood problems such as not enough platelets or white blood cells. Trimethoprim may cause sun sensitivity. There is evidence of potential harm during pregnancy in some animals but not humans. It works by blocking folate metabolism via dihydrofolate reductase in some bacteria, preventing creation of bacterial DNA and RNA and leading to bacterial cell death.

Trimethoprim was first used in 1962. It is on the World Health Organization's List of Essential Medicines. It is available as a generic medication.

== Medical uses ==
It is primarily used in the treatment of urinary tract infections, although it may be used against any susceptible aerobic bacterial species. It may also be used to treat and prevent Pneumocystis jirovecii pneumonia. It is generally not recommended for the treatment of infections caused by anaerobic organisms, such as Clostridioides difficile colitis (the leading cause of antibiotic-induced diarrhea). Trimethoprim has been used in trials to treat retinitis. The combination drug, trimethoprim/polymyxin B, is commonly used in the treatment of acute bacterial conjunctivitis and blepharoconjunctivitis.

Resistance to trimethoprim is increasing, but it is still a first-line antibiotic in many countries.

=== Spectrum of susceptibility ===
Cultures and susceptibility tests should be done to make sure bacteria are treated by trimethoprim.

- Escherichia coli
- Proteus mirabilis
- Klebsiella pneumoniae
- Enterobacter species
- Coagulase-negative Staphylococcus species, including S. saprophyticus
- Streptococcus pneumoniae
- Haemophilus influenzae

== Side effects ==
=== Common ===
- Nauseas
- Change in taste
- Vomiting
- Diarrhoea
- Rashes
- Sun sensitivity
- Itchiness

=== Rare ===
- Can cause thrombocytopenia (low levels of platelets) by lowering folic acid levels; this may also cause megaloblastic anemia.
- Trimethoprim antagonizes the epithelial sodium channel in the distal tubule, thus acting like amiloride. This can cause increased potassium levels in the body (hyperkalemia).
- Can compete with creatinine for secretion into the renal tubule. This can cause an artificial rise in the serum creatinine.
- Use in enterohemorrhagic E. coli (EHEC) infections may lead to an increase in expression of Shiga toxin.

=== Contraindications ===
- Known hypersensitivity to trimethoprim
- History of megaloblastic anemia due to folate deficiency

It may be involved in a reaction similar to disulfiram when alcohol is consumed after it is used, in particular when used in combination with sulfamethoxazole.

=== Pregnancy ===
Based on the studies that show that trimethoprim crosses the placenta and can affect folate metabolism, there has been growing evidence of the risk of structural birth defects associated with trimethoprim, especially during the first trimester of pregnancy.

The trophoblasts in the early fetus are sensitive to changes in the folate cycle. A 2013 study found a doubling in the risk of miscarriage in women exposed to trimethoprim in the early pregnancy.

== Mechanism of action ==
Staphylococcus aureus DHFR in complex with NADPH and trimethoprim PDB entry 2W9G

Trimethoprim binds to dihydrofolate reductase and inhibits the reduction of dihydrofolic acid (DHF) to tetrahydrofolic acid (THF). THF is an essential precursor in the thymidine synthesis pathway and interference with this pathway inhibits bacterial DNA synthesis. Trimethoprim's inhibitory activity for bacterial dihydrofolate reductase is sixty thousand times greater than for human dihydrofolate reductase. Sulfamethoxazole inhibits dihydropteroate synthase, an enzyme involved further upstream in the same pathway. Trimethoprim and sulfamethoxazole are commonly used in combination due to possible synergistic effects, and reduced development of resistance. This benefit has been questioned.

Tetrahydrofolate synthesis pathway

== History ==
Trimethoprim was first used in 1962. In 1972, it was used as a prophylactic treatment for urinary tract infections in Finland.

Its name is derived from trimethyloxy-pyrimidine.
