= Dihydrofolic acid =

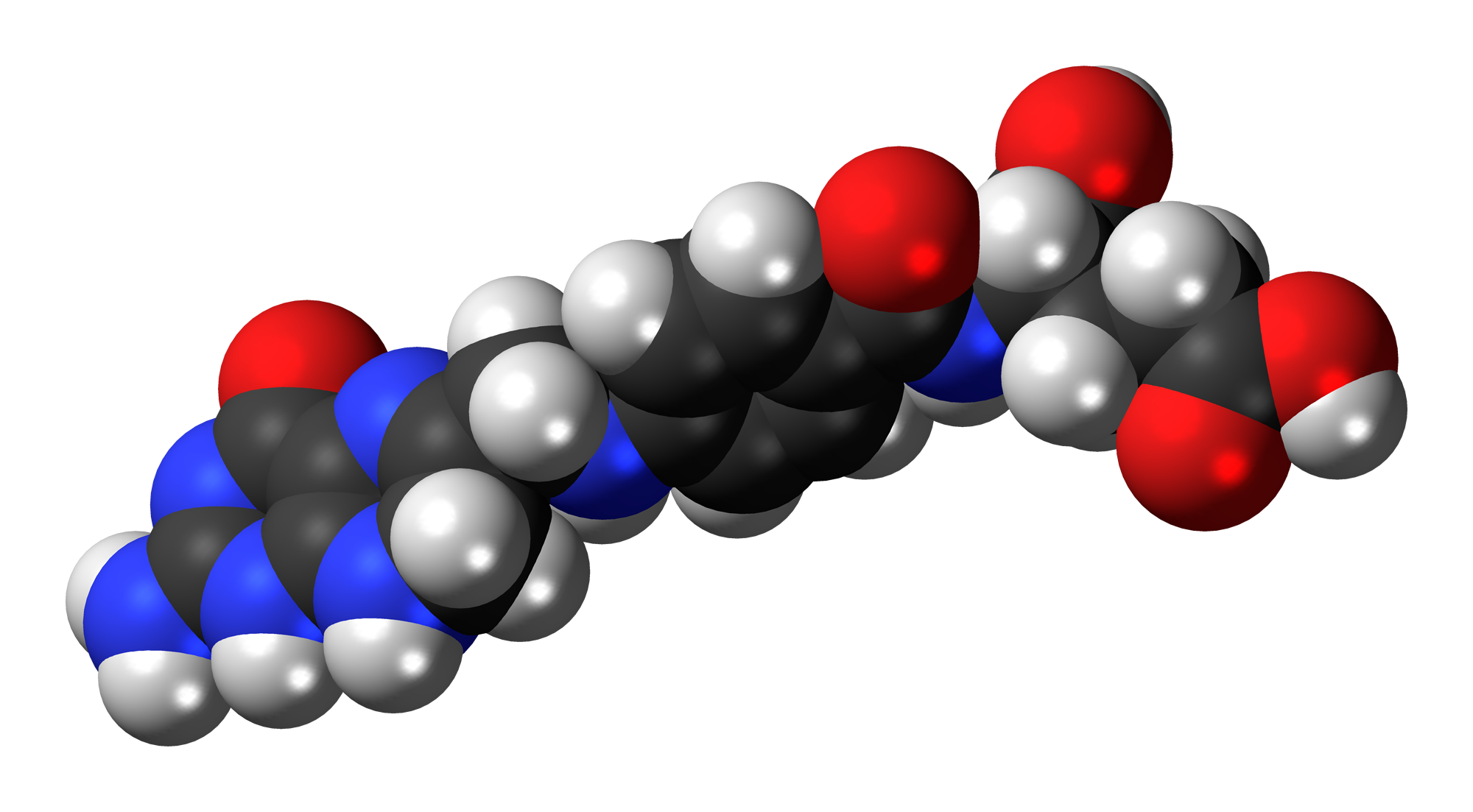

Names
- IUPAC name N-(4-{[(2-amino-4-oxo-1,4,7,8-tetrahydropteridin-6-yl)methyl]amino}benzoyl)-L-glutamic acid
- Other names H_{2}folate, DH

Identifiers
CAS Number	4033-27-6
3D model (JSmol)	Interactive image
ChEBI	CHEBI:15633
ChEMBL	ChEMBL46294
ChemSpider	89228
ECHA InfoCard	100.116.435
MeSH	dihydrofolate
PubChem CID	98792
UNII	KXP0KNM559
CompTox Dashboard (EPA)	DTXSID401027140
- InChI: InChI=1S/C19H21N7O6/c20-19-25-15-14(17(30)26-19)23-11(8-22-15)7-21-10-3-1-9(2-4-10)16(29)24-12(18(31)32)5-6-13(27)28/h1-4,12,21H,5-8H2,(H,24,29)(H,27,28)(H,31,32)(H4,20,22,25,26,30)/t12-/m0/s1 Key: OZRNSSUDZOLUSN-LBPRGKRZSA-N; InChI=1/C19H21N7O6/c20-19-25-15-14(17(30)26-19)23-11(8-22-15)7-21-10-3-1-9(2-4-10)16(29)24-12(18(31)32)5-6-13(27)28/h1-4,12,21H,5-8H2,(H,24,29)(H,27,28)(H,31,32)(H4,20,22,25,26,30)/t12-/m0/s1 Key: OZRNSSUDZOLUSN-LBPRGKRZBB
- SMILES: O=C(O)[C@@H](NC(=O)c1ccc(cc1)NCC/2=N/C=3C(=O)\N=C(/NC=3NC\2)N)CCC(=O)O

Properties
Chemical formula	C_{19}H_{21}N_{7}O_{6}
Molar mass	443.414 g/mol
- Except where otherwise noted, data are given for materials in their standard state (at 25 °C [77 °F], 100 kPa). verify (what is ?) Infobox references

Dihydrofolic acid (conjugate base dihydrofolate) (DHF) is a folic acid (vitamin B_{9}) derivative which is converted to tetrahydrofolic acid by dihydrofolate reductase. Since tetrahydrofolate is needed to make both purines and pyrimidines, which are building blocks of DNA and RNA, dihydrofolate reductase is targeted by various drugs to prevent nucleic acid synthesis.

Pathway of tetrahydrofolate and antimetabolites

== Interactive pathway map ==
Click on genes, proteins and metabolites below to link to respective articles. (Note: The interactive pathway map can be edited at WikiPathways: "FluoropyrimidineActivity_WP1601".)

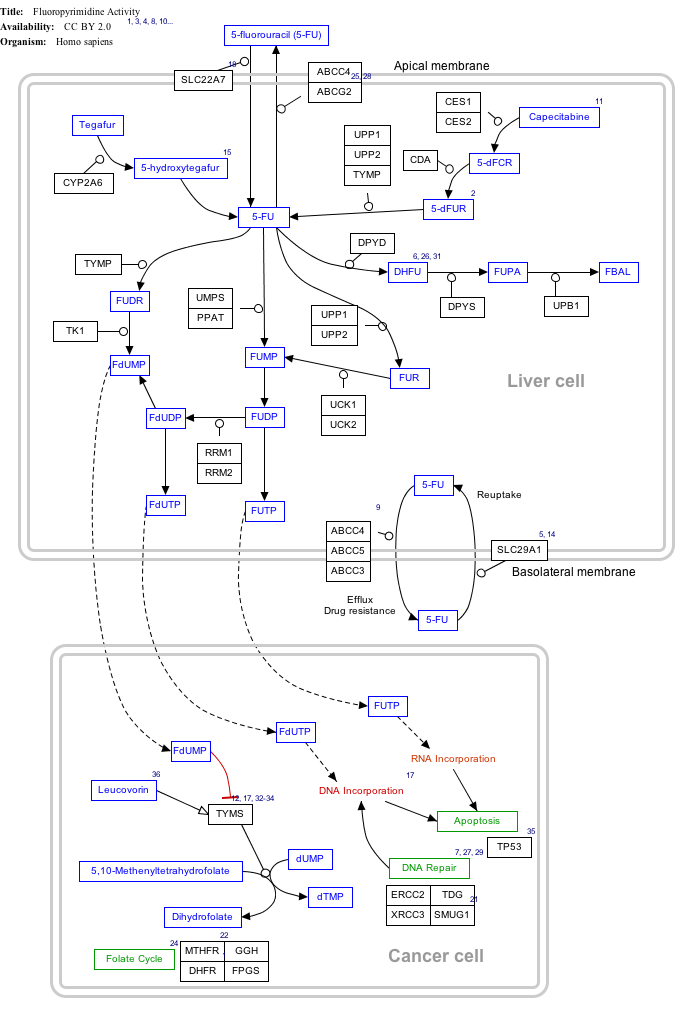

Fluorouracil (5-FU) Activity edit
