= Tetrahydrofolic acid =

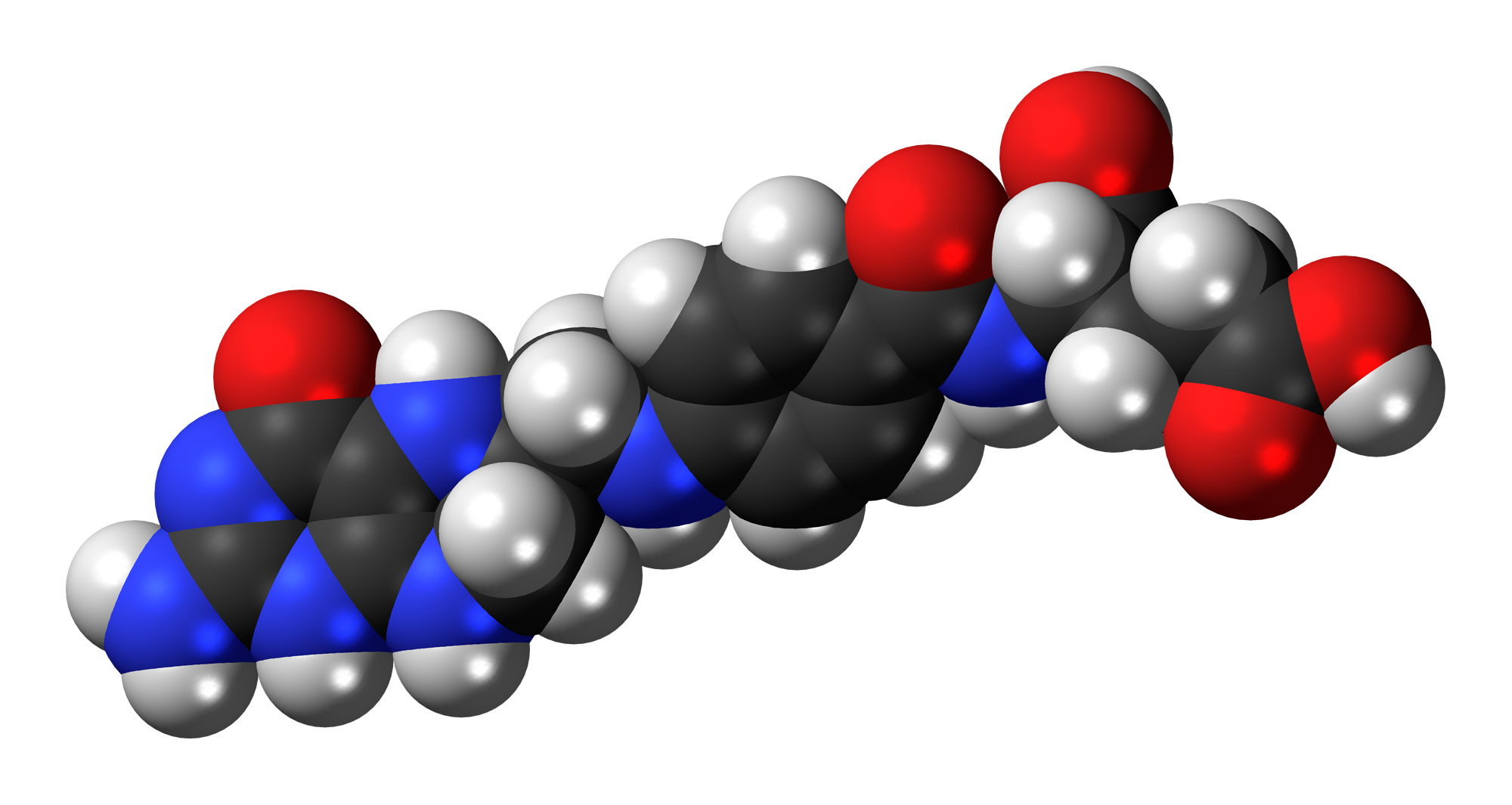

Names
- IUPAC name N-[4-({[(6Ξ)-2-Amino-4-oxo-1,4,5,6,7,8-hexahydropteridin-6-yl]methyl}amino)benzoyl]-L-glutamic acid
- Systematic IUPAC name (2S)-2-[4-({[(6Ξ)-2-Amino-4-oxo-1,4,5,6,7,8-hexahydropteridin-6-yl]methyl}amino)benzamido]pentanedioic acid

Identifiers
CAS Number	135-16-0
3D model (JSmol)	Interactive image
Beilstein Reference	101189
ChEBI	CHEBI:20506
ChemSpider	82572
DrugBank	DB00116
IUPHAR/BPS	4675
KEGG	C00101
MeSH	5,6,7,8-tetrahydrofolic+acid
PubChem CID	91443
UNII	43ZWB253H4
- InChI: InChI=1S/C19H23N7O6/c20-19-25-15-14(17(30)26-19)23-11(8-22-15)7-21-10-3-1-9(2-4-10)16(29)24-12(18(31)32)5-6-13(27)28/h1-4,11-12,21,23H,5-8H2,(H,24,29)(H,27,28)(H,31,32)(H4,20,22,25,26,30)/t11?,12-/m0/s1 Key: MSTNYGQPCMXVAQ-KIYNQFGBSA-N; InChI=1/C19H23N7O6/c20-19-25-15-14(17(30)26-19)23-11(8-22-15)7-21-10-3-1-9(2-4-10)16(29)24-12(18(31)32)5-6-13(27)28/h1-4,11-12,21,23H,5-8H2,(H,24,29)(H,27,28)(H,31,32)(H4,20,22,25,26,30)/t11?,12-/m0/s1 Key: MSTNYGQPCMXVAQ-KIYNQFGBBC
- SMILES: O=C(O)[C@@H](NC(=O)c1ccc(cc1)NCC3N/C2=C(/N/C(=N\C2=O)N)NC3)CCC(=O)O

Properties
Chemical formula	C_{19}H_{23}N_{7}O_{6}
Molar mass	445.43 g/mol
Melting point	250 °C (482 °F; 523 K)
Solubility in water	0.27 g/L
Acidity (pK_{a})	3.51
- Except where otherwise noted, data are given for materials in their standard state (at 25 °C [77 °F], 100 kPa). verify (what is ?) Infobox references

Tetrahydrofolic acid (THFA), or tetrahydrofolate, is a folic acid derivative. It is an active form of folic acid and functions as a one-carbon carrier. In biochemistry, it is also notated H_{4}PteGlu, referring to its alternative name tetrahydropteroylglutamate.

== Metabolism ==
Pathway of tetrahydrofolate and antimetabolites

In most organisms, tetrahydrofolic acid is produced from dihydrofolic acid by dihydrofolate reductase. A number of inhibitors of the enzyme can block this reaction, including the non-selective methotrexate (used against cancer) and the more selective pyrimethamine or trimethoprim (used for infections).

It is converted into 5,10-methylenetetrahydrofolate by serine hydroxymethyltransferase.

Many bacteria produce tetrahydrofolic acid via dihydropteroate. Humans lack the enzymes to do this, thus molecules that shut down these enzymes are effective antibacterial compounds. For example, sulfonamide antibiotics competitively bind the active site of dihydropteroate synthetase, excluding the binding of the dihydropteroate precursor, 4-aminobenzoic acid (PABA).

== Functions ==
Tetrahydrofolic acid is a key cofactor in one-carbon metabolism. Specifically it serves as a carrier for single-carbon moieties, that is, groups containing one carbon atom e.g. methyl, methylene, methenyl, formyl, or formimino. When combined with one such single-carbon moiety as in 10-formyltetrahydrofolate, it acts as a donor of a group with one carbon atom. Tetrahydrofolate gets this extra carbon atom by sequestering formaldehyde produced in other processes.

These single-carbon moieties are important in the higher-level functions of THF, i.e. the synthesis of amino acids and nucleic acids, the building blocks of proteins, DNA, and RNA. A shortage in tetrahydrofolic acid (FH4) can cause megaloblastic anemia.

Tetrahydrofolic acid is involved in the conversion of formiminoglutamic acid to glutamic acid; this may reduce the amount of histidine available for decarboxylation and protein synthesis, and hence the urinary histamine and formiminoglutamic acid may be decreased.

Dihydrofolic acid

5,10-Methylenetetrahydrofolic acid

10-Formyltetrahydrofolic acid

== See also ==
- Tetrahydromethanopterin
