= Macrocytosis =

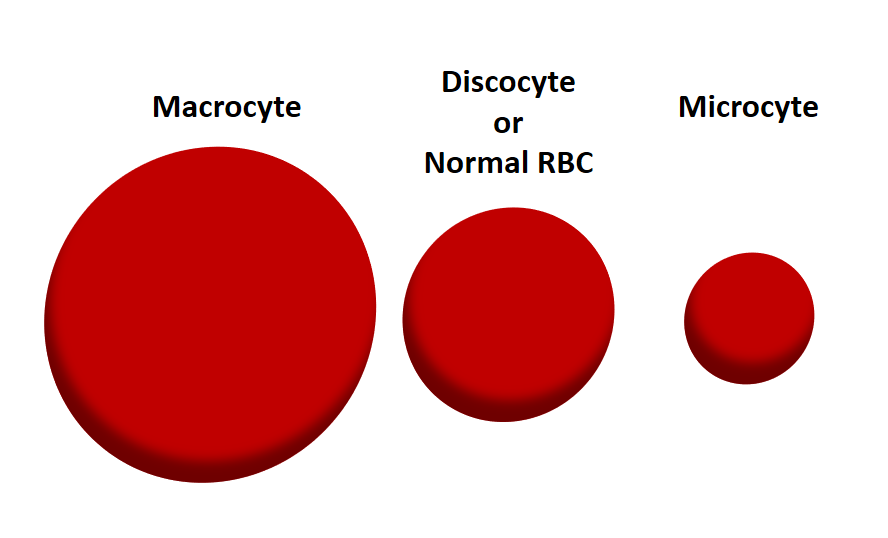
Macrocytosis
- Other names: Macrocytes
- Specialty: Hematology
- Symptoms: Shortness of breath, weakness, heart murmur, tachycardia
- Causes: Vitamin B12 deficiency, Folic acid deficiency, Malabsorption, Alcoholism
- Risk factors: Bone marrow failure, hematologic malignancy
- Diagnostic method: Symptoms, Complete blood count, Peripheral blood smear, Vitamin B12 level, Red cell folate level

Macrocytosis is a condition where red blood cells are larger than normal. These enlarged cells, also known as macrocytes, are defined by a mean corpuscular volume (MCV) that exceeds the upper reference range established by the laboratory and hematology analyzer (usually >110 fL). Upon examination of a peripheral blood smear under microscope, these macrocytes appear larger than standard erythrocytes. Macrocytosis is a common morphological feature in neonatal peripheral blood. The presence of macrocytosis can indicate a range of conditions, from benign, treatable illnesses to more serious underlying disorders.

== Types ==
Macrocytes may be oval or round. Oval macrocytes (also called megalocytes) are seen in conditions associated with dyserythropoiesis including megaloblastic anemia, myelodysplastic syndromes, Fanconi anemia and CDA type I & III. Round macrocytes are associated with other causes of macrocytosis.

== Causes ==
In humans, the most prevalent causes of macrocytosis are often linked to alcoholism and deficiencies in vitamin B_{12} or folate (vitamin B_{9}), or a combination of these factors. These conditions can affect the production and development of red blood cells, leading to their enlargement. Another cause of macrocytosis is benign familial macrocytosis, which is a hereditary condition that does not present symptoms. Despite the larger size of the red blood cells, individuals with this condition typically have normal red blood cell function. Causes of macrocytosis may include:

- Megaloblastic anemia due to deficiency or abnormal metabolism of vitamin B_{12} or folate
  - Poor dietary intake, including due to strict veganism
  - Increased requirements
  - Pernicious anemia
  - Malabsorption syndromes
- Alcoholism
- Smoking
- Reticulocytosis due to hemolysis, blood loss and hematinics
- Hypothyroidism
- Myelodysplastic syndromes (MDS)
- Congenital dyserythropoietic anemia
- Aplastic anemia and bone marrow failure syndromes
- Inherited disorders of DNA synthesis
  - Homocystinuria
  - Lesch–Nyhan syndrome
  - Deficient enzymes for folate metabolism
- Liver disease
- Chronic obstructive pulmonary disorder (COPD)
- Certain drugs, including folate antagonists, purine antagonists, tyrosine kinase inhibitors, anti-HIV drugs etc.

== Complications ==
Macrocytosis does not itself lead to complications. Prognosis depends on its cause.

== See also ==
- Macrocytic anemia
- Myelodysplastic syndrome
