= Cerebral folate deficiency =

5-MTHF deficiency in the brain

- Other names: Cerebral folate deficiency syndrome, decreased CSF 5-methyltetrahydrofolate concentration, low CSF 5-methyltetrahydrofolate Narrower in scope: cerebral folate transport deficiency, neurodegeneration due to cerebral folate transport deficiency, FOLR1 deficiency
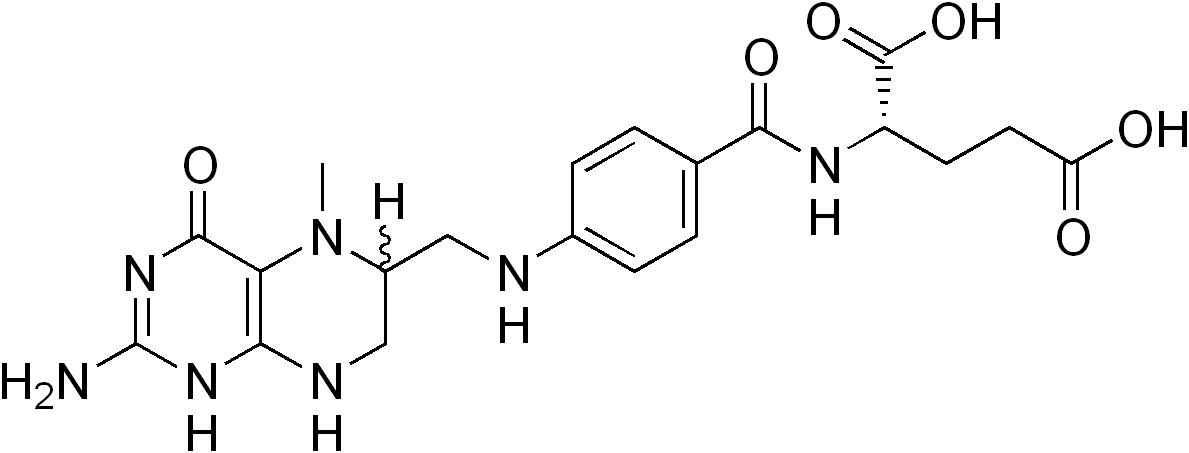
- 5-methyltetrahydrofolate is decreased in concentration in the human brain
- Symptoms: poor muscle tone, trouble with coordination, trouble talking, and seizures
- Causes: Genetic disorder, autoantibodies
- Diagnostic method: Lumbar puncture
- Medication: Folinic acid
- Frequency: FOLR1 mutation, <20 described cases

Cerebral folate deficiency (CFD) is a syndrome in which concentrations of 5-methyltetrahydrofolate (5-MTHF) are low in the brain as measured in the cerebral spinal fluid despite being normal in the blood. Symptoms typically appear at about 5 to 24 months of age. Without treatment there may be poor muscle tone, trouble with coordination, trouble talking, and seizures.

One cause of cerebral folate deficiency is a mutation in a gene responsible for folate transport, specifically FOLR1. This is inherited in an autosomal recessive manner. Other causes include Kearns–Sayre syndrome,, autoantibodies to the folate receptor FOLR1, and metabolic errors such as 5,10-methenyltetrahydrofolate synthetase deficiency.

For people with the FOLR1 mutation, even when the systemic deficiency is corrected by folate, the cerebral deficiency remains and must be treated with folinic acid. Success depends on early initiation of treatment for lengthy periods. Fewer than 20 people with the FOLR1 defect have been described in the medical literature.

== Signs and symptoms ==
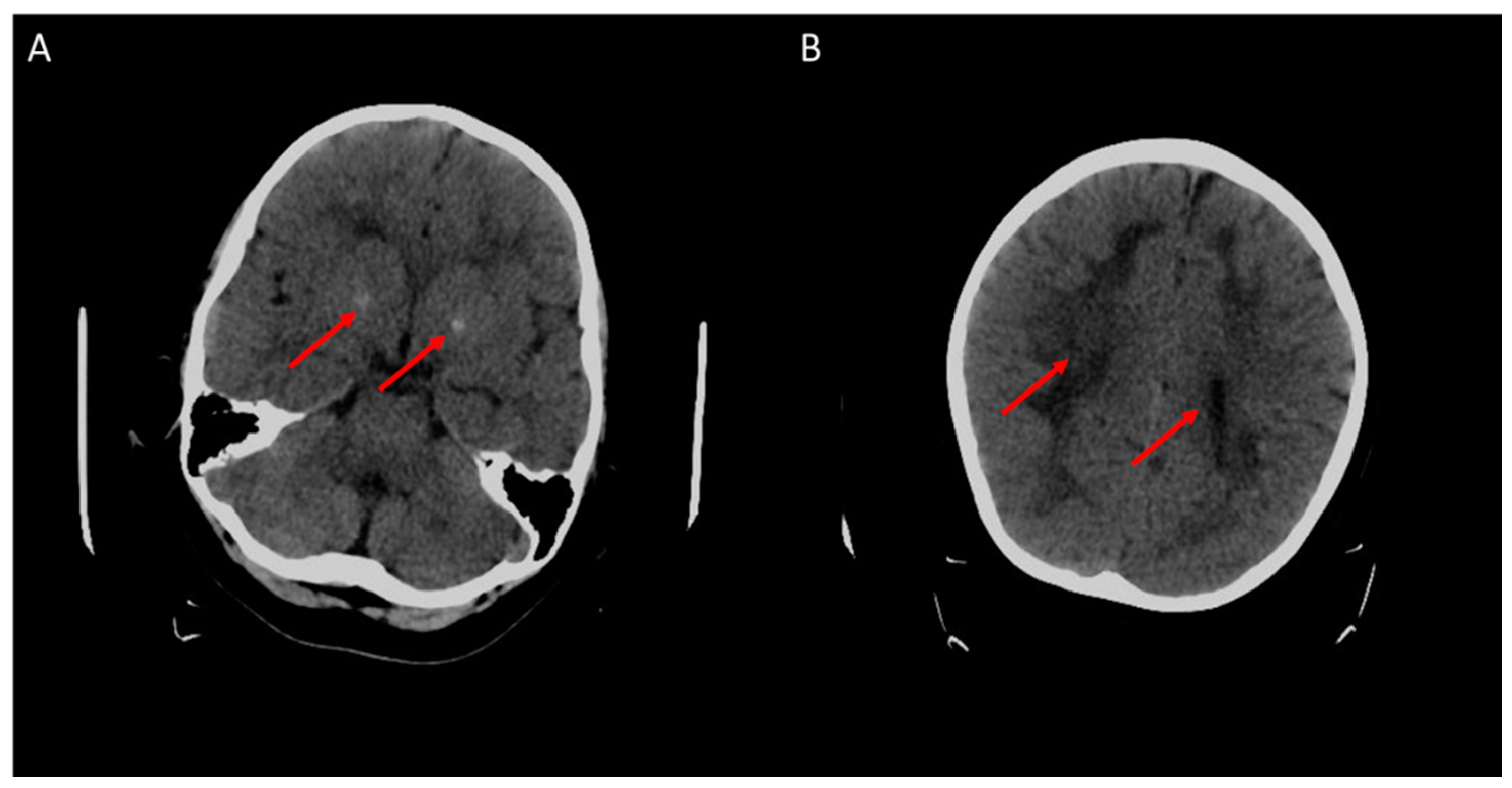
Cerebral CT-scan at 4 years old. Red arrows show brain calcifications (A) and diffuse white matter abnormalities (B). From Mafi et al., 2020

Children with the FOLR1 mutation are born healthy. Symptoms typically appear at about 5 to 24 months of age. The symptoms get worse with time. Without treatment there may be poor muscle tone, trouble with coordination, trouble talking, and seizures. In addition, signs of psychomotor retardation, sleep disturbances, cerebellar ataxia, and delayed development of head growth can occur. At around age three, visual disturbances can develop, and sensorineural hearing loss can occur at around age six.

In cerebral folate deficiency, the brain does not receive a proper supply of 5-MTHF and fails to properly grow. There may be visible loss of white matter in the brain (leukodystrophy) upon imaging.

== Causes ==
The best-known of cerebral folate deficiency is due to a genetic mutation in the FOLR1 gene. It is inherited in an autosomal recessive manner. The mutation of the FOLR1 gene causes an inability to produce the folate receptor alpha (FRA) protein.

CFD can also involve the malfunction and disruption of the FRA in other ways. One way the FRA can be disrupted is by the attachment of the autoantibodies, causing dysfunction in the receptor. Also, a mitochondrial disease can impact the functioning of the folate receptor alpha. In order for the receptor to function properly, energy from the mitochondria is required. Folate must be actively transported into the brain, so ATP from the mitochondria is essential. If the individual has a mitochondrial disease, the FRA could be lacking adequate energy, resulting in the deficiency of folate in the brain.

Besides a malfunctioning transport system, cerebral folate deficiency can also be caused by malfunctioning biochemical pathways, often mutations in genes that code for enzymes in the folate. This is seen in 5,10-methenyltetrahydrofolate synthetase deficiency (MTHFS deficiency), MTHFR deficiency, DHFR deficiency, and occasionally MTHFD1 defienciency.

Sometimes less-related biochemical pathways can also lead to a presentation of CFD, often called a "secondary" cerebral folate deficiency. CFD can develop in AADC deficiency through the depletion of methyl donors, such as SAM and 5-MTHF, by O-methylation of the excessive amounts of L-DOPA present in patients. Other causes include the Kearns–Sayre syndrome (which seems to involve problems besides mitochondrial energy generation), serine deficiency, DHPR deficiency, and (in some older patients) pyridoxine dependent epilepsy.

There are also cases of CFD not explained by genetic tests. Those are possibly secondary to using medications that consume methyl bases during metabolis or to oxidative stress or other forms of toxic insult.

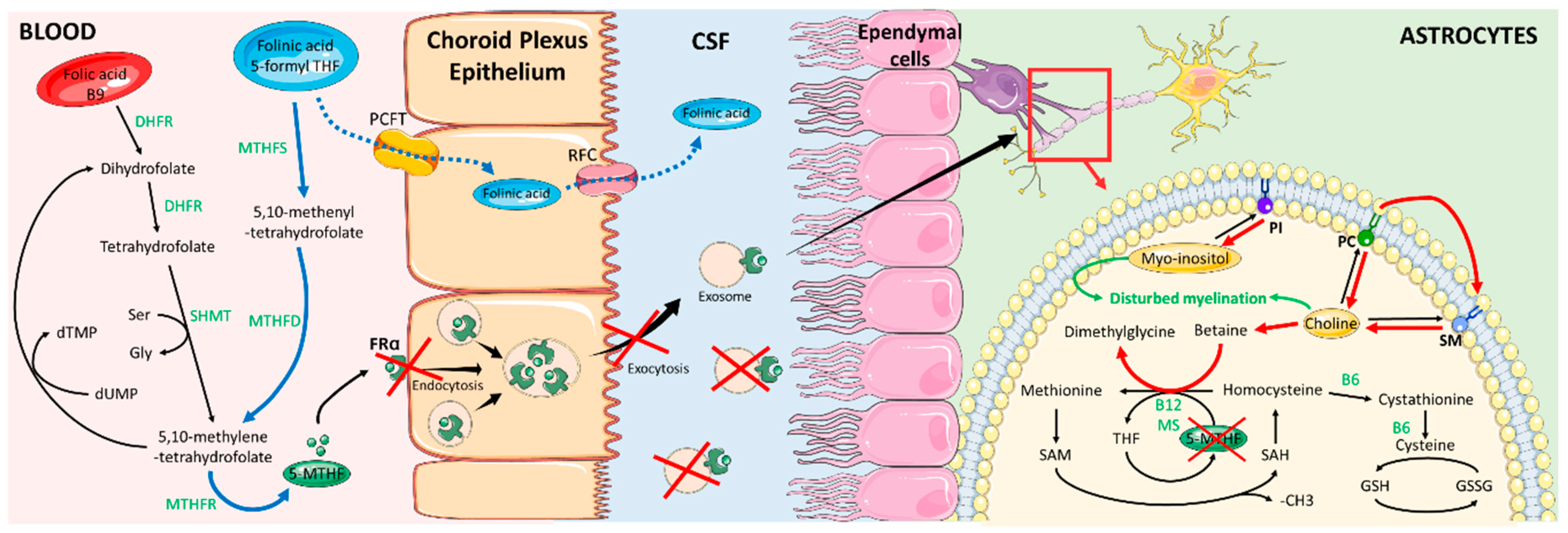
Folic acid metabolism and 5-MTHF transport across the choroid plexus epithelium in the brain. Red arrows and red crosses indicate the alternative pathway induced by FRα deficiency. Blue arrows indicate effects of folinic acid treatment. KEYS: 5-MTHF: 5-methylenetetrahydrofolate; B6: Vitamin B6; B12: Vitamin B12; CSF: cerebrospinal fluid; DHFR: dihydrofolate reductase; FRα: receptor of folate alpha; Gly: glycine; GSH: glutathione reduced states; GSSG: Glutathione oxidized states; MS: methionine synthase; MTHFD: methylenetetrahydrofolate dehydrogenase; MTHFR: methylenetetrahydrofolate reductase; MTHFS: methylenetetrahydrofolate synthetase; PC: phosphatidylcholine; PCFT: proton coupled folate transporter; PI: phosphatidylinositol; RFC: reduced folate carrier; SAH: S-adenosyl homocysteine; SAM: S-adenosyl-methionine; Ser: Serine; SHMT: serine-hydroxy methyl transferase; SM: sphingomyelin. Figure 1 from Mafi et al., 2020.

== Diagnosis ==
The syndrome is discovered by testing for 5-MTHF levels in the spinal fluid and the blood. Genetic testing is then performed to try and identify a cause.

== Treatment ==
For people with the FOLR1 mutation, even when the systemic deficiency is corrected by folate (the oxidized form - folic acid), the cerebral deficiency remains, and must be treated with folinic acid. Folinic acid is a metabolically active form of folate that can be easily introduced into the folate cycle. A typical dose that is administered to children is 0.5–1 mg/kg daily, but the dose can be increased depending on the severity of symptoms and the age of the child. Over time, the treatment with folinic acid has shown to reduce a variety of symptoms of CFD. The treatment of folinic acid can lead to improvements in walking, speech, interpersonal skills and reduction in seizures. Success depends on early initiation of treatment. Starting the folinic acid treatment before the age of six is more advantageous for the child with CFD. If the treatment is started after the age of six, its results are not as effective. Treatment requires taking folinic acid for lengthy periods. Fewer than 20 people with the FOLR1 defect have been described in the medical literature.

Folinic acid (5-formyl-THF, 5-fTHF) also appears useful for some other forms of CFD. Pharmacologic doses of folinic acid has also led to reversal of some symptoms in children diagnosed with cerebral folate deficiency and testing positive for autoantibodies to folate receptor alpha. It also appears useful in DHFR deficiency and AADC deficiency.

5-MTHF (5-methyl-THF) is also available as a drug (levomefolic acid). It is "thought to be the most efficient way to restore CSF 5-MTHF concentrations". Unlike folinic acid, it may be used in MTHFR deficiency and MTHFS deficiency: 5-MTHF is the directly usable form of folate in methoinine metabolism, in contrast to folinic acid which needs to be converted to 5-MTHF by these enzymes.

Secondary CFD could be treated by non-folate drugs, depending on the precise cause. For example, serine deficiency can be helped by direct supplementation of serine and glycine: this helps with seizure control but does little for psychomotor development.

Folic acid (FA), the oxidized form commonly found in diet and ordinary supplements, is not suitable for most forms of CFD and may worsen it. "Transport of folate compounds from the intestine to the brain and competitive inhibition of 5-MTHF transport by FA. Conversion of FA to 5-MTHF is limited in the intestine and is mainly handled by DHFR in the liver, although its enzymatic activity is low in humans. In contrast, folinic acid is efficiently metabolized to 5-MTHF in the intestine and liver. When an excess amount of FA is taken, it cannot be fully reduced by DHFR in the liver and unmetabolized FA appears in the plasma. Because FA has higher affinity to FR1 expressed at the choroid plexus than 5-MTHF, it can act as a competitive inhibitor against 5-MTHF transport from the plasma to the CSF. In addition, FA cannot be metabolized to 5-MTHF efficiently in the brain with extremely low DHFR activity. Thus, excess FA intake may lead to a less effective supply of 5-MTHF to the brain compared with that of folinic acid supplementation."

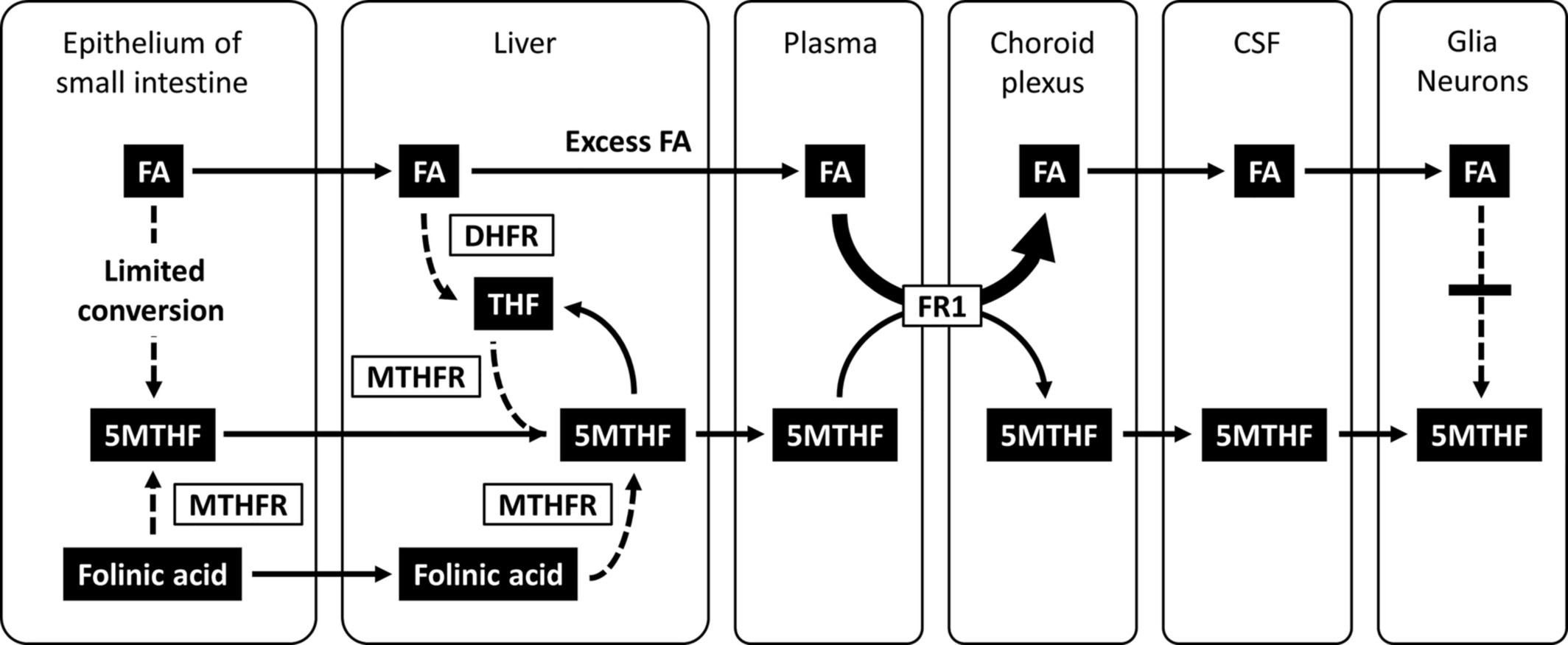
Probable mechanism by which folic acid impedes the entry of 5-MTHF into the central nervous system in vulnerable individuals. From Tomoyuki Akiyama et al., 2022. Dashed arrows indicate more-than-one-step enzymatic reactions. 5-MTHF, 5-methyltetrahydrofolic acid; CSF, cerebrospinal fluid; DHFR, dihydrofolate reductase; FA, folic acid; FR1, folate receptor 1; MTHFR, methylenetetrahydrofolate reductase; THF, tetrahydrofolate"

== See also ==
- Hereditary folate malabsorption
- 5,10-methenyltetrahydrofolate synthetase deficiency - microcephaly, short stature, developmental delay, hypomyelination
- Folate deficiency
