= Hereditary folate malabsorption =

- Other names: Congenital folate malabsorption
- Hereditary folate malabsorption is inherited in an autosomal recessive manner
- Specialty: Medical genetics

Hereditary folate malabsorption (HFM) is a rare autosomal recessive disorder caused by loss-of-function mutations in the proton-coupled folate transporter (PCFT) gene, resulting in systemic folate deficiency and impaired delivery of folate to the brain.

== Signs and symptoms ==
Affected infants present within a few months after birth with failure to thrive and severe folate deficiency manifested as macrocytic anemia and developmental delays. There can be (i) pancytopenia, (ii) diarrhea and/or mucositis and/or (iii) immune deficiency due to T-cell dysfunction and hypoimmunoglobulinemia resulting in pneumonia usually due to Pneumocystis jirovecii. Recently, several infants with the immune deficiency syndrome were described. Untreated, or with inadequate treatment, there are progressive systemic and neurological signs with a spectrum of manifestations including seizures that are often intractable. Females with HFM are fertile and, if folate sufficient during pregnancy, have normal offspring. Subjects that carry one mutated PCFT allele are normal. The genomic and clinical features of HFM were recently reviewed.

== Pathophysiology ==
Extensive clinical studies established that HFM is due to (i) impaired intestinal absorption of folates and (ii) impaired transport of folates across the blood-choroid plexus-cerebrospinal fluid (CSF) barrier. Hence, patients with HFM have very low or undetectable folate blood levels. When a modest dose of a folate is given by mouth, there is impaired intestinal folate absorption without other signs of malabsorption.

=== Molecular pathogenesis ===
The molecular basis for HFM was established in 2006 with the identification of the proton-coupled folate transporter (PCFT) as the mechanism of intestinal absorption of folates and the detection of loss-of-function mutations in this transporter in subjects with a clinical diagnosis of HFM. Hence, beyond the characteristic clinical features, genotyping is now available to establish the diagnosis of HFM.

=== PCFT ===
PCFT is located on chromosome 17q11.2 and consists of 459 amino acids, with five exons, and a MW of approximately 50kDa. The secondary structure has been established and consists of twelve transmembrane domains with the N- and C- termini directed into the cytoplasm. The properties of this transporter and its physiological and pharmacological roles were recently reviewed. Elements of PCFT regulation have been described and include the minimal promoter, Vitamin D and NRF1 response elements. PCFT operates most efficiently when there is a strong transmembrane pH gradient. Under these conditions transport of a folate molecule across the cell membrane is accompanied by a sufficient number of protons to result a positive charge and current mediated by the ternary carrier complex. It is the pH gradient present across the apical brush-border membrane of the proximal jejunum, where PCFT is highly expressed, that drives intestinal folate absorption. PCFT is expressed to a lesser extent elsewhere in the small and large intestine along with the canalicular membrane of the hepatic sinusoid and in the apical brush-border membrane of the proximal tubule of the kidney. However, its function at these latter sites is unclear. As indicated above, PCFT is also expressed at the basolateral membrane of ependymal cells of the choroid plexus where it presumably plays a role in transport of folates into the CSF.

== Diagnosis ==
The CSF folate level is usually undetectable at the time of diagnosis. Even when the blood folate level is corrected, or far above normal, the CSF folate level remains low, consistent with impaired transport across the choroid plexus. The normal CSF folate level in children over the first three years of life is in the 75 to 150 nM range. In subjects with HFM it is rarely possible to bring the CSF folate level into the normal range even with substantial doses of parenteral folate.

=== Differential diagnosis ===
HFM must be distinguished from cerebral folate deficiency (CFD)– a syndrome in which there is normal intestinal folate absorption, without systemic folate deficiency, but a decrease in CSF folate levels. This can accompany a variety of disorders. One form of CFD is due to loss-of-mutations in folate receptor-α, (FRα), which transports folates via an endocytic process. While PCFT is expressed primarily at the basolateral membrane of the choroid plexus, FRα is expressed primarily at the apical brush-border membrane. Unlike subjects with HFM, patients with CFD present with neurological signs a few years after birth. The basis for the delay in the appearance of clinical manifestations due to loss of FRα function is not clear; the normal blood folate levels may be protective, although for a limited time.

== Treatment ==
Because HFM is a rare disorder, there are no studies that define its optimal treatment. Correction of the systemic folate deficiency, with the normalization of folate blood levels, is easily achieved with high doses of oral folates or much smaller doses of parenteral folate. This will rapidly correct the anemia, immune deficiency and GI signs. The challenge is to achieve adequate treatment of the neurological component of HFM. It is essential that the folate dose is sufficiently high to achieve CSF folate levels as close as possible to the normal range for the age of the child. This requires close monitoring of the CSF folate level. The physiological folate is 5-methyltetrahydrofolate but the oral formulation available is insufficient for treatment of this disorder and a parenteral form is not available. The optimal folate at this time is 5-formyltetrahydrofolate which, after administration, is converted to 5-methyltetrahydrofolate. The racemic mixture of 5-formyltetrahydrofolate (leucovorin) is generally available; the active S-isomer, levoleucovorin, may be obtained as well. Parenteral administration is the optimal treatment if that is possible. Folic acid should not be used for the treatment of HFM. Folic acid is not a physiological folate. It binds tightly to, and may impede, FRα-mediated endocytosis which plays an important role in the transport of folates across the choroid plexus into the CSF (see above). For a further consideration of treatment see GeneReviews.

== Epidemiology ==
As of June 2014 (the latest update on HFM in GeneReviews) a total of 32 families had been reported with a clinical diagnosis of HFM of which there was genotypic confirmation in 24 families. Since then, another two confirmed cases have been reported and an additional case was reported based on a clinical diagnosis alone. Most cases emerge from consanguineous parents with homozygous mutations. There are three instances of HFM from non-consanguineous parents in which there were heterozygous mutations. HFM cases are worldwide with mostly private mutations. However, a number of families of Puerto Rican ancestry have been reported with a common pathogenic variant at a splice receptor site resulting in the deletion of exon 3 and the absence of transport function. A subsequent population-based study of newborn infants in Puerto Rico identified the presence of the same variant on the island. Most of the pathogenic variants result in a complete loss of the PCFT protein or point mutations that result in the complete loss of function. However, residual function can be detected with some of the point mutants.

== Figures ==
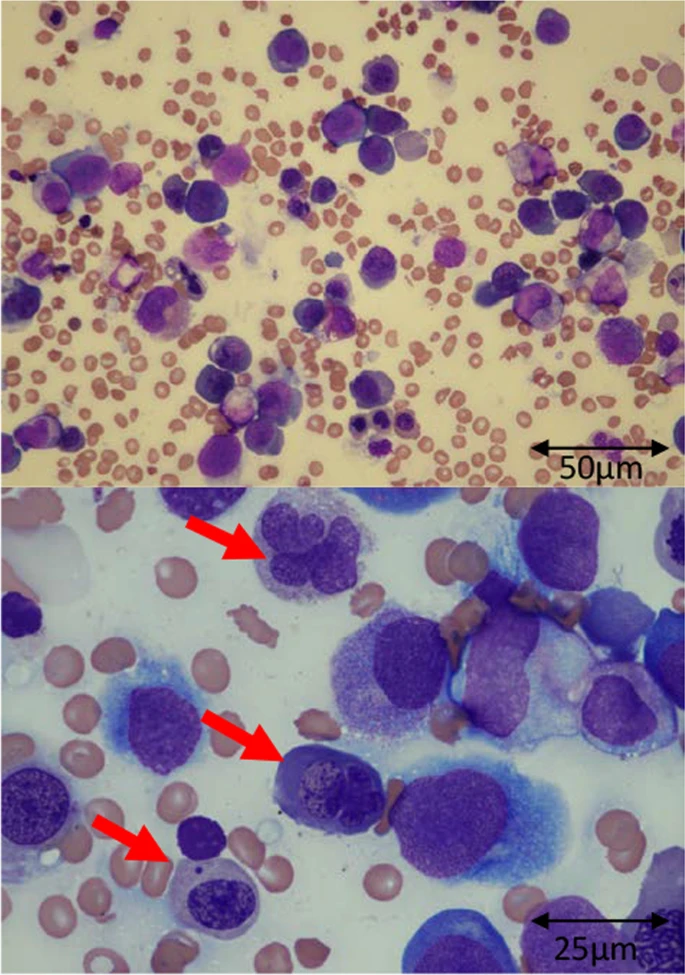
May Grünwald–Giemsa staining of bone marrow cells taken from a patient with hereditary folate malabsorption, from a case report by Yukari Sakurai et al., 2022 Hyperplasia of erythrocyte series was confirmed and the red arrows were showing megaloblastic change; the ratio of myeloid cells to erythroid cells was found to be markedly decreased to 0.36. The nucleated cell count was 105 × 109/L. The number of megakaryocytes was reduced (0.016 × 109/L) for hyperplastic bone marrow.

== See also ==
- Cerebral folate deficiency
