= 5,10-methenyltetrahydrofolate synthetase deficiency =

Neurodevelopmental disorder

5,10-Methenyltetrahydrofolate synthetase deficiency
- Other names: MTHFS deficiency
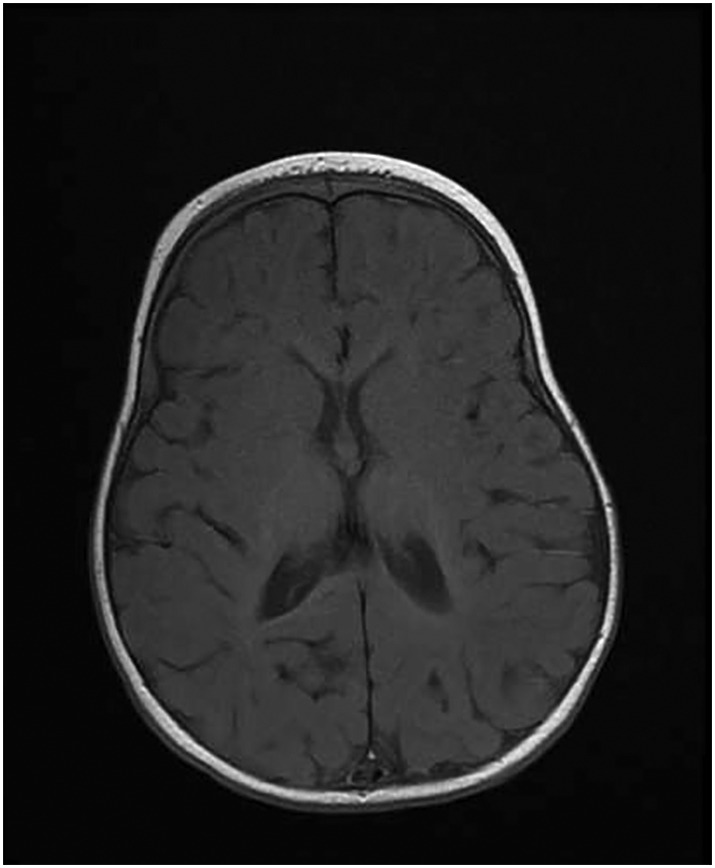
- Axial T1-weighted MRI of the brain at 10 months old showing under-myelination of the internal capsules, relative under-myelination of the remainder of the subcortical white matter, and a thin corpus callosum. From an MTHFS deficiency case report by Romero et al., 2019.
- Symptoms: Microcephaly, short stature, and developmental delay.
- Complications: Seizures.
- Usual onset: Birth.
- Frequency: Rare

5,10-Methenyltetrahydrofolate synthetase deficiency (MTHFS deficiency) is a rare neurodevelopmental disorder caused by mutations affecting the MTHFS gene, which encodes the enzyme 5,10-methenyltetrahydrofolate synthetase. This enzyme is responsible for the conversion of folinic acid (5-FTHF) into 5,10-methenyltetrahydrofolate (5,10-MTHF).

The disease starts at birth or in early infancy and presents with microcephaly, short stature, and global developmental delay. Patients develop seizures that may be hard to control. Brain imaging shows delayed myelination and hypomyelination. Mutations of the MTHFS gene disrupt folate metabolism, which is very important for the proper development of the nervous system and myelination of nerve fibers.

Patients present with cerebral folate deficiency, a condition in which there are reduced levels of 5-MTHF in the cerebrospinal fluid. Further testing shows an accumulation of 5-FTHF. Contrary to other causes of cerebral folate deficiency, the use of folinic acid and folic acid are likely harmful due to the inability of patients to convert them to 5-MTHF: these would only contribute to 5-FTHF accumulation. The few case reports indicate that folinic acid and folic acid both worsened cerebral folate deficiency, and that a combination of oral levomefolic acid (the medication form of 5-MTHF) and intramuscular methylcobalamin was apparently helpful.

The first case report of MTHFS deficiency was published in 2018.

== Pathophysiology ==
MTHFS is the enzyme responsible for converting 5-FTHF into 5,10-MTHF. It forms a futile cycle with the enzyme serine hydroxymethyltransferase (SHMT) which converts 5,10-MTHF into 5-FTHF. When MTHFS becomes dysfunctional, an accumulation of 5-FTHF result from the action of SHMT. Any dietary or supplemental folinic acid would likely compound this accumulation.

The accumulation of folinic acid (5-FTHF) is believed to lead to toxicity over many different cells in the body, though it is not exactly clear how. 5-FTHF is known to inhibit SHMT, an enzyme also responsible for the conversion of tetrahydrofolate (THF) into 5,10-MTHF. 5,10-MTHF is a key "hub" step in the utilization of folates, as it leads to both the methyl donor 5-MTHF and the formyl donor 10-Formyltetrahydrofolate (10-FTHF). The former is important in the methionine cycle while the latter is important in purine biosynthesis. A possible explanation of the observed abnormal myelination is that failure of methionine synthesis leads to deficiency of S-adenosylmethionine, important in the methylation of myelin basic protein and phospholipids. Mitochondrial protein synthesis is also likely affected due to the inability to make methionyl-tRNA.

5-FTHF also inhibits the purine metabolism enzyme AICAR transformylase, though no symptoms obviously related to disrupted purine metabolism is seen in this condition.

The attempted treatment - 5-MTHF and methylcobalamin - tries to directly address the 5-MTHF deficiency with the medication form. Methylcobalamin is included in hopes that it would reduce the consuption of 5-MTHF as a main function of 5-MTHF in the methionine cycle is to convert other forms of cobalamin into methylcobalamin.

== See also ==
- Cerebral folate deficiency
