= HFM =

HFM may refer to:

- Hachette Filipacchi Médias, a magazine publisher
- Harborough FM, a radio station covering Market Harborough and South Leicestershire in the United Kingdom
- Harvest Fund Management, a Chinese asset management company
- Hemifacial microsomia
- Hand, Foot and Mouth disease, a human disease
- Henry Ford Museum, in Dearborn, Michigan, United States
- Hereditary folate malabsorption
- Hi Fly Malta, a Maltese airline
- Hiroshima FM, a radio station in the Hiroshima area
- His or Her Most Faithful Majesty
- Hollow fiber membrane
- The Hunger for More, a 2004 album by rapper Lloyd Banks
- Healthcare Financial Management Association
