= Pamlab =

American medical food company

Alfasigma USA, Inc. (formerly Pamlab) is an American medical food company, and a division of Alfasigma Group, of Bologna, Italy.

Alfasigma's base of operations is located in Bedminster, New Jersey.

== History ==
The company entered the pharmaceutical industry in 1957, initially introducing prescription cough/cold products. In 1987, Pamlab was purchased by Samuel and Judith Camp.

In early 2013, Pamlab was purchased by Nestlé Health Science.

In December 2016, Pamlab was purchased by Alfasigma Group of Bologna, Italy.

== Legal actions ==
Alfasigma USA, Inc. was sued by ExeGi Pharma LLC, and the Italian inventor of probiotic VSL#3, Claudio De Simone, for making false advertising claims and ownership rights to VSL#3.

According to court documents: "Defendant VSL Inc., and its licensees Alfasigma and Leadiant, having lost the right to sell the De Simone Formulation, decided to manufacture, market, and sell a different, inferior formulation (the “Fraudulent Formulation”) without conducting any tests to determine if the Fraudulent Formulation would be efficacious in any way".

A scientific article published in Frontiers in Immunology concluded: "These discrepancies may have a major impact on patient safety and on the liability of doctors when they prescribe a probiotic formulation made with different processes at different production sites from the formulation, which generated the original evidence, without properly informing the patients".

A class action related to the VSL#3 scandal was recently opened in the USA.

== Products ==
Alfasigma USA, Inc. produces medical foods for people with diabetic peripheral neuropathy, early memory loss/Alzheimer's, high-risk pregnancy, depression, and other medical conditions.

Some of Alfasigma USA's products include the following:

- VSL#3
- Deplin
- Metanx
- Cerefolin
- Cerefolin NAC
- Neevo DHA
- Proxeed Plus
- Colief
- Carnitine Bulk Ingredients

== See also ==
- Nestlé Health Science
- Medical Food
