= Folinic acid =

Derivative of folic acid used in cancer treatment

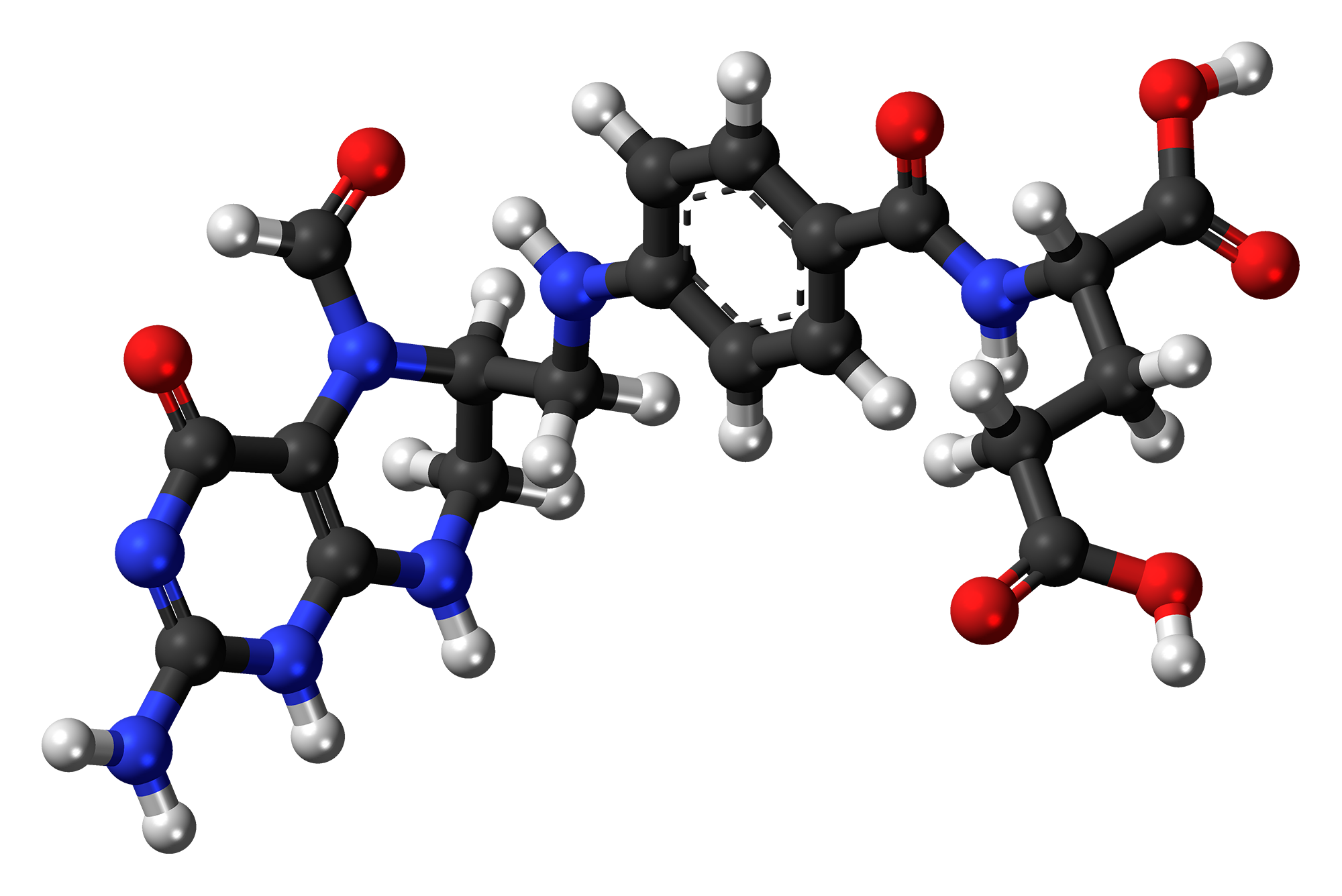

Clinical data
- Pronunciation: Leucovorin /ˌljuːkoʊˈvɔːrɪn/
- Other names: Leucovorin, citrovorum factor, 5-formyltetrahydrofolate
- AHFS/Drugs.com: Monograph
- MedlinePlus: a608038
- License data: US DailyMed: Leucovorin calcium
- Pregnancy category: AU: A
- Routes of administration: By mouth, intramuscular, intravenous
- ATC code: V03AF03 (WHO)

Legal status
- Legal status: US: ℞-only

Pharmacokinetic data
- Bioavailability: Dose dependent
- Protein binding: ~15%
- Elimination half-life: 6.2 hours
- Excretion: Kidney

Identifiers
- IUPAC name: (2S)-2-{[4-[(2-amino-5-formyl-4-oxo-5,6,7,8- tetrahydro-1H-pteridin-6-yl)methylamino] benzoyl]amino}pentanedioic acid
- CAS Number: 1492-18-8
- PubChem CID: 135403648
- IUPHAR/BPS: 4816
- DrugBank: DB00650
- ChemSpider: 5784
- UNII: RPR1R4C0P4
- ChEMBL: ChEMBL1679
- CompTox Dashboard (EPA): DTXSID0048216
- ECHA InfoCard: 100.000.328

Chemical and physical data
- Formula: C_{20}H_{23}N_{7}O_{7}
- Molar mass: 473.446 g·mol^{−1}
- 3D model (JSmol): Interactive image
- Melting point: 245 °C (473 °F) decomp
- Solubility in water: ~0.3 mg/mL (20 °C)
- SMILES: O=C(O)[C@@H](NC(=O)c1ccc(cc1)NCC3N(/C2=C(/N/C(=N\C2=O)N)NC3)C=O)CCC(=O)O
- InChI: InChI=1S/C20H23N7O7/c21-20-25-16-15(18(32)26-20)27(9-28)12(8-23-16)7-22-11-3-1-10(2-4-11)17(31)24-13(19(33)34)5-6-14(29)30/h1-4,9,12-13,22H,5-8H2,(H,24,31)(H,29,30)(H,33,34)(H4,21,23,25,26,32)/t12?,13-/m0/s1; Key:VVIAGPKUTFNRDU-ABLWVSNPSA-N

Folinic acid, also known as leucovorin, is a medication used to decrease the toxic effects of methotrexate and pyrimethamine. It is also used in combination with 5-fluorouracil to treat colorectal cancer and pancreatic cancer, and may be used to treat folate deficiency, anemia, and methanol poisoning. It is taken by mouth, injection into a muscle, or injection into a vein. Better known as 5-formyltetrahydrofolate in biochemistry, it is a natural form of folate, albeit with no clear function.

Side effects may include trouble sleeping, allergic reactions, or fever. Use in pregnancy or breastfeeding is generally regarded as safe. When used for anemia it is recommended that pernicious anemia as a cause be ruled out first. Folinic acid is a form of folic acid that does not require activation by dihydrofolate reductase to be useful to the body.

Folinic acid was first made in 1945. In 2025, the United States Food and Drug Administration approved leucovorin calcium tablets for cerebral folate deficiency, bypassing standard review and drawing expert criticism. It is on the World Health Organization's List of Essential Medicines.

== Medical uses ==
Levofolinic acid

Folinic acid can be taken as a pill (orally) or injected into a vein (intravenously) or muscle (intramuscularly).

=== To reduce the effects of methotrexate ===
Folinic acid is administered after methotrexate as part of a comprehensive chemotherapy regimen to help prevent bone marrow suppression and inflammation of the gastrointestinal mucosa. However, no apparent effect is seen on pre-existing methotrexate-induced nephrotoxicity.

While not specifically an antidote for methotrexate, folinic acid may also be useful in the treatment of acute methotrexate overdose. Different dosing protocols are used, but folinic acid should be redosed until the methotrexate level is less than 5 × 10^{−8} M.

Additionally, folinic acid is sometimes used to reduce the side effects of methotrexate in rheumatoid arthritis patients. This includes reductions in nausea, abdominal pain, abnormal liver blood tests, and mouth sores.

=== Cerebral folate deficiency ===
Folinic acid is also used in the treatment of cerebral folate deficiency (CFD), a syndrome of low levels of 5-methyltetrahydrofolate (5-MTHF), the active folate metabolite, within the cerebrospinal fluid (CSF). This disorder appears in the presence of normal folate metabolism outside the central nervous system and may be associated with decreased folate transport or increased folate turnover within the CSF.

As the use of folic acid cannot normalize cerebrospinal fluid levels of 5-MTHF, the US Food and Drug Administration (FDA) began the process of approving leucovorin calcium tablets for treating this syndrome.

=== Autism spectrum disorder ===
Folinic acid (or leucovorin) for the treatment of autism spectrum disorder (ASD) is an experimental treatment, which has shown positive outcomes in several small studies but has not been studied to the extent normally required for researchers, doctors, and regulators to endorse as a standard treatment. All pediatric and ASD medical organizations which have issued statements have cautioned that more, better-quality studies are needed, and none have endorsed the treatment as of December 2025.

In January 2026, the largest trial of leucovorin in autistic children was retracted due to discovery of various errors.

==== Studies ====
Before any medical treatment gains widespread acceptance and adoption by medical practitioners, typically, the treatment is studied in controlled, randomized, double-blind trials with large sample sizes (large numbers of patients). The scientific evidence for leucovorin use in ASD treatment is "quite preliminary, modest, and based on small studies without rigorous outcomes to date," according to Dr. Beth Ellen Davis, UVA developmental behavioral pediatrician. Studies also used different doses, metrics, and methods of statistical analysis, which complicates their use as a basis from which to derive clinical suggestions.

==== Positions of medical organizations ====
Organization	Date	Statement
The American Academy of Pediatrics	October 2025	"At this time, the American Academy of Pediatrics does not recommend the routine use of leucovorin (folinic acid) for autistic children."
Autism Science Foundation	December 2025	"This science is still in very early stages, and more studies are necessary before a definitive conclusion can be reached. While this drug poses no apparent health risks, there is not sufficient data to show that it improves autism symptoms."
Society for Developmental & Behavioral Pediatrics	October 2025	"Much more research is needed on folate receptor autoantibodies and leucovorin as possible treatments for autism. The research on leucovorin comes from a very limited number of studies of variable quality, each using different doses and measuring different outcomes, making it impossible to draw definitive conclusions."
US Food and Drug Administration (FDA)	September 2025	"CFD has also been reported in a broader patient population with neuropsychiatric symptoms, including autistic features, and detectable serum autoantibodies to the folate receptor alpha; however, there are limitations on the available data for the use of leucovorin in this population and additional studies are needed to assess safety and efficacy."

=== Other uses or indications ===
Folinic acid is also used in combination with the chemotherapy agent 5-fluorouracil in treating colon cancer. In this case, folinic acid is not used for "rescue" purposes; rather, it enhances the effect of 5-fluorouracil by inhibiting thymidylate synthase.

Folinic acid is also sometimes used to prevent the toxic effects of high doses of antimicrobial dihydrofolate reductase inhibitors such as trimethoprim and pyrimethamine. Its value for this indication has not been clearly established. It may be prescribed in the treatment of toxoplasmosis retinitis, in combination with the folic acid antagonists pyrimethamine and sulfadiazine.

In pyridoxine-dependent epilepsy, folinic acid may be used as additional therapy if pyridoxine or pyridoxal phosphate fails to control the seizures fully.

== Side effects ==
Folinic acid should not be administered intrathecally. This may produce severe adverse effects or even death. Severe neurotoxicity due to intrathecal folinic acid as treatment for intrathecally-administered methotrexate was first noted in an 11-year-old boy being treated for acute lymphocytic leukemia.

In cancer patients, rare hypersensitivity reactions to folinic acid have been described.

== Drug interactions ==
- Fluorouracil: Folinic acid may increase the toxicity associated with fluorouracil if the two are administered together. Some adverse effects that may occur include nausea, diarrhea, fatigue, and myelosuppression.
- Sulfamethoxazole-trimethoprim: A potential drug interaction exists with concomitant use of sulfamethoxazole-trimethoprim and folinic acid. Folinic acid has been shown to decrease the efficacy of sulfamethoxazole-trimethoprim in the treatment of Pneumocystis jirovecii (formerly known as Pneumocystis carinii), a common cause of pneumonia in AIDS patients.

== Biochemistry ==
It is not totally clear why cells make folinic acid (5fTHF); a common suggestion is that folinic acid serves as a storage form of folate in dormant cells, but at the same time mammal cells do not accumulate it. In vivo, folinic acid is produced from 5,10-methenyltetrahydrofolate in an irreversible reaction catalyzed by serine hydroxymethyltransferase (SHMT). It can then be consumed by methenyltetrahydrofolate synthetase (MTHFS) in another irreversible reaction to yield 5,10-methenyltetrahydrofolate again: a futile cycle. 5f-THF is also an inhibitor of SHMT and phosphoribosylaminoimidazolecarboxamide formyltransferase (AICARFT).

According to mathematical modeling, the futile cycle could act as a dampener in the broader network of folate-mediated one-carbon metabolism, stabilizing it against stochastic noise from folate deficiency and/or reduced MTHFR activity due to genetic variation. It was also predicted that 5-MTHF is the main inhibitor for SHMT under physiological conditions.

MTHFS deficiency is a disease where the exit from the "futile cycle" is disrupted, causing an accumulation of folinic acid.

== Mechanism of action ==
Folinic acid is a 5-formyl derivative of tetrahydrofolic acid. It is readily converted to other reduced folic acid derivatives (e.g., 5,10-methylenetetrahydrofolate, 5-methyltetrahydrofolate), thus has vitamin activity equivalent to that of folic acid. Since it does not require the action of dihydrofolate reductase for its conversion, its function as a vitamin is unaffected by inhibition of this enzyme by drugs such as methotrexate. This is the classical view of folinic acid rescue therapy.

In the 1980s, however, folinic acid was found to reactivate dihydrofolate reductase itself even when methotrexate exists. Although the mechanism is not very clear, the polyglutamylation of methotrexate and dihydrofolate in malignant cells is considered to play an important role in the selective reactivation of dihydrofolate reductase by folinic acid in normal cells. In either case, folinic acid allows for some functioning of the folic acid system to occur in the presence of dihydrofolate reductase inhibition. One important function is purine/pyrimidine synthesis, required for DNA replication processes can proceed.

Folinic acid has dextro- and levorotary isomers. Both levoleucovorin (the levorotary isomer) and racemic folinic acid (a mixture of both isomers) have similar efficacy and tolerability. Levoleucovorin was approved by the FDA in 2008.

== History ==
Folinic acid was discovered as a needed growth factor for the bacterium Leuconostoc citrovorum in 1948, by Sauberlich and Baumann. This resulted in it being called "citrovorum factor", meaning citrovorum growth factor. It had an unknown structure, but was found to be a folate derivative that had to be metabolized in the liver before it could support the growth of L. citrovorum. The synthesis of citrovorum factor by liver cells in culture was eventually accomplished from pteroylglutamic acid in the presence of suitable concentrations of ascorbic acid. The simultaneous addition of sodium formate to such systems increased citrovorum factor activity in the cell-free supernatants (producing, as is now known, the 5-formyl derivative). From this method of preparation of large amounts of the factor, its structure as levo-folinic acid (5-formyl tetrahydrofolic acid) was eventually deduced.

In September 2025, the US Food and Drug Administration (FDA) initiated the process of approving leucovorin calcium tablets for the treatment of cerebral folate deficiency, a condition associated with developmental delays, autistic features, seizures, and movement issues. The approval bypassed the FDA's standard rigorous drug-review procedures, drawing criticism from experts and leading to increased sales of over-the-counter folinic acid supplements.

On 10 March 2026, the FDA approved leucovorin tablets for FOLR1-related cerebral folate transport deficiency in children and adults.

== Society and culture ==
=== Names ===
Folinic acid should be distinguished from folic acid (vitamin B_{9}). However, folinic acid is a vitamer of folic acid and has the full vitamin activity of this vitamin. Levofolinic acid and its salts are the 2S-form of the molecule. They are the only forms of the molecule that are known to be biologically active.

It is generally administered as the calcium or sodium salt (calcium folinate [INN], sodium folinate, leucovorin calcium, leucovorin sodium).
