= Haladaptatus paucihalophilus =

Scientific classification
- Domain: Archaea
- Kingdom: Methanobacteriati
- Phylum: Methanobacteriota
- Class: Halobacteria
- Order: Halobacteriales
- Family: Haladaptataceae
- Genus: Haladaptatus
- Species: H. paucihalophilus

Binomial name
- Haladaptatus paucihalophilus Savage et al 2007, emend.

Species of archaeon

Haladaptatus paucihalophilus is a halophilic archaeal species, originally isolated from a spring in Oklahoma. It uses a new pathway to synthesize glycine, and contains unique physiological features for osmoadaptation.

== Discovery ==
H. paucihalophilus was originally found in 2004, but was not classified as a species at the time; only the Halobacteriales were studied. H. paucihalophilus was isolated from the Zodletone Spring in Oklahoma. It was originally considered to have two different strains: DX253 and GY252. However, the two strains were later deemed a single species, since they have a 97.7% species similarity in 16S ribosomal RNA sequence analysis. To isolate H. paucihalophilus specifically, soil samples from the spring were taken and later inoculated onto a halophile-selective medium and then analyzed further after colony growth. Testing was done for Gram stain, carbon source, acid production, growth at minimal salt concentration, and antibiotic sensitivity. Also, PCR was performed with the primers A1F and UA1406R. H. paucihalophilus was named for its ability to grow in low-salt environments (Latin paucus meaning little, Greek hals meaning salt, Greek philos meaning loving).

== Ecology ==
Most species within the Halobacteriaceae can be found in environments such as springs and marshes, that contain a high salt concentration. However, many of these archaeal species that have a high tolerance to salt may also exist in low-salt environments. H. paucihalophilus is capable of surviving and growing within a broad range of salt concentrations, so can also be found living in low-salt environments, much like Zodletone Spring.

== Phylogeny ==
On the basis of 16S ribosomal RNA sequencing H. paucihalophilus is similar to the species Halalkalicoccus tibetensis by 89.5-90.8% with the differences concentrated at the base pairs of 1-200 and 400-800. Differences with the phospholipid content in H. paucihalophilus when compared to other halophilic genera mainly constitutes the differentiation.

== Characterization ==
=== Morphology ===
H. paucihalophilus is a coccus-shaped chemoorganotroph, nonmotile, and pink-pigmented archaeal species. H. paucihalophius cells are 1.2 μm in diameter with a doubling time of 12–13 hours, and are found growing as single cells or in pairs. This species contains the phospholipids: phosphatidylglycerol, phosphatidylglycerol phosphate methyl ester, and phosphatidylglycerol sulfate. It produces acid, grows at a pH range of 5.0-7.5, and is able to grow in salt concentrations from 0.8-5.1 M.

=== Metabolism ===
The flow of carbon for H. paucihalophilus is done with the oxidative tricarboxylic acid cycle, but it does not use the reductive tricarboxylic acid cycle. It uses glutamic acid, histidine, norleucine, phenylalanine, D-glucuronic acid, aesculin, trehalose, dextrin, salicin, sucrose, fructose, xylose, glucose, galactose, glycerol, citrate, pyruvate, acetate, starch, lactate, mannitol, fumarate, and malate as sources of carbon. H. paucihalophilus is aerobic, so it uses oxygen as a terminal electron acceptor. It is not capable using nitrate, sulfate, thiosulfate, elemental sulfur, dimethyl sulfoxide, or trimethylamine N-oxide as an electron acceptor for growth in anaerobic conditions. In this species, lysine synthesis is done by the diaminopimelate pathway, the typical pathway for halophilic archaea. H. paucihalophillus sets itself apart by its biosynthesis of glycine by using a mixture of three biosynthetic pathways, which are the serine hydroxymethyltransferase pathway, the threonine aldolase pathways, and the reverse of the glycine cleavage system.

=== Genomics ===
The size of the genome of H. paucihalophilus is 4,317,540 total bases. It contains 4,489 genes, of which 4,429 are protein-coding genes. The G-C content of H. paucihalophilus is 60.5 mol%.

== Scientific importance ==
This particular halophile has an importance in the scientific field because not only can it survive high salt concentrations, but it can also tolerate low salt concentrations, making it a target species to study in the laboratory. It is also the first microbe to be recognized that is able to synthesize glycine using different pathways besides the typical serine hydroxymethyltransferase pathway. H. paucihalophilus is an organism to study due to its unique physiological features for osmoadaptation, which is its ability to adjust to differences in osmolarity by having salt within its cytoplasm.
