= Metanx =

Combination of
- L-methylfolate: vitamin
- Pyridoxal 5'-phosphate: vitamin
- Methylcobalamin: vitamin

Clinical data
- ATC code: A11EA (WHO)

Identifiers
- CAS Number: 12001-76-2
- ChemSpider: none

Metanx is a prescription medical food made by Alfasigma that contains L-methylfolate (as Metafolin, a calcium salt of vitamin B_{9}), methylcobalamin (vitamin B_{12}) and pyridoxal 5'-phosphate (vitamin B_{6}). It is a vitamin B supplement. Metanx is indicated for the dietary management of peripheral neuropathy (i.e. DPN).

== Ingredients ==
Metanx contains the following active ingredients (per capsule):

- Folate
- L-methylfolate (Metafolin): 3 mg
- Pyridoxal 5'-phosphate: 35 mg
- Methylcobalamin: 2 mg

== Indication and usage ==
Metanx is used for treating:

- Painful diabetic neuropathy,
- Diabetic foot ulcers,
- Endothelial dysfunction associated with diabetic peripheral neuropathy,
- Hyperhomocysteinemia.
