= Proton-coupled folate transporter =

Mammalian protein found in Homo sapiens

SLC46A1

Identifiers
- Aliases: SLC46A1, G21, HCP1, PCFT, solute carrier family 46 member 1
- External IDs: OMIM: 611672; MGI: 1098733; GeneCards: SLC46A1

Gene location (Human)
Chr.	Chromosome 17 (human)
Band	17q11.2	Start	28,394,642 bp
Band	17q11.2	End	28,407,197 bp

Gene location (Mouse)
Chr.	Chromosome 11 (mouse)
Band	11 B5|11 46.74 cM	Start	78,356,523 bp
Band	11 B5|11 46.74 cM	End	78,362,885 bp
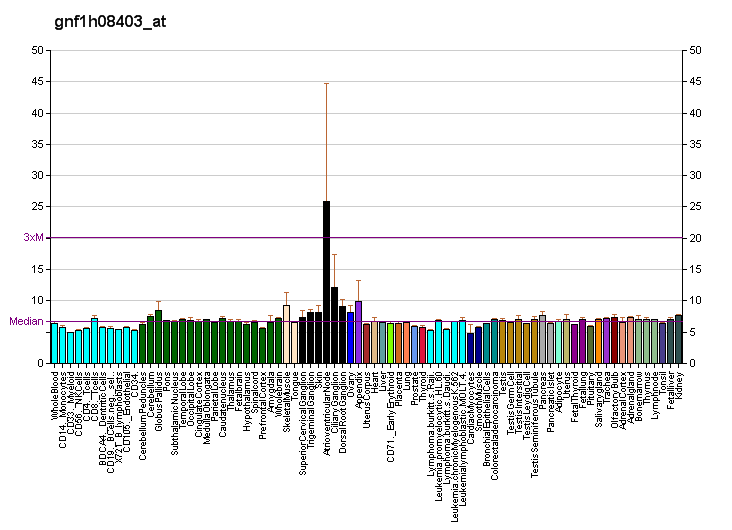
RNA expression pattern
Bgee	Human / Mouse (ortholog); Top expressed in: jejunal mucosa; duodenum; right adrenal gland; right adrenal cortex; left adrenal cortex; right lobe of liver; right uterine tube; body of pancreas; anterior pituitary; islet of Langerhans / Top expressed in: duodenum; morula; blastocyst; right kidney; choroid plexus of fourth ventricle; neural layer of retina; parotid gland; left lobe of liver; jejunum; proximal tubule; More reference expression data
BioGPS	More reference expression data
Gene ontology
Molecular function	transporter activity; folic acid binding; proton transmembrane transporter activity; methotrexate transmembrane transporter activity; folic acid transmembrane transporter activity; heme transmembrane transporter activity
Cellular component	cytoplasm; integral component of membrane; membrane; cell surface; brush border membrane; apical plasma membrane; plasma membrane
Biological process	folate import across plasma membrane; proton transmembrane transport; heme transport; folic acid metabolic process; intestinal folate absorption; cellular iron ion homeostasis; folic acid transport; methotrexate transport; transmembrane transport; transport
Sources:Amigo / QuickGO
Orthologs
Databases	NCBI: entry; OMA: entry
Species	Human	Mouse
Entrez	113235	52466
Ensembl	ENSG00000076351	ENSMUSG00000020829
UniProt	Q96NT5	Q6PEM8
RefSeq (mRNA)	NM_001242366; NM_080669	NM_026740
RefSeq (protein)	NP_001229295; NP_542400	NP_081016
Location (UCSC)	Chr 17: 28.39 – 28.41 Mb	Chr 11: 78.36 – 78.36 Mb
PubMed search
- Wikidata
View/Edit Human	View/Edit Mouse

The proton-coupled folate transporter is a protein that in humans is encoded by the SLC46A1 gene. The major physiological roles of PCFTs are in mediating the intestinal absorption of folate (Vitamin B9), and its delivery to the central nervous system.

== Structure ==
PCFT is located on chromosome 17q11.2 and consists of five exons encoding a protein with 459 amino acids and a MW of ~50kDa. PCFT is highly conserved, sharing 87% identity to the mouse and rat PCFT and retaining more than 50% amino acid identity to the frog (XP415815) and zebrafish (AAH77859) proteins. Structurally, there are twelve transmembrane helices with the N- and C- termini directed to the cytoplasm and a large internal loop that divides the molecule in half. There are two glycosylation sites (N58, N68) and a disulfide bond connecting residues C66, in the 1st and C298 in the 4th, external loop. Neither glycosylation nor the disulfide bond are essential for function. Residues have been identified that play a role in proton-coupling, proton binding, folate binding and oscillation of the carrier between its conformational states. PCFT forms oligomers and some of the linking residues have been identified.

== Regulation ==
PCFT-mediated transport into cells is optimal at pH 5.5. The low-pH activity and the structural specificity of PCFT (high affinity for folic acid, and low affinity for PT523 - a non-polyglutamable analog of aminopterin) distinguishes this transporter functionally from the other major folate transporter, the reduced folate carrier (optimal activity at pH 7.4, very low affinity for folic acid and very high affinity for PT523), another member (SLC19A1) of the superfamily of solute transporters. Influx mediated by PCFT is electrogenic and can be assessed by current, cellular acidification, and radiotracer uptake. Influx has a Km range of 0.5 to 3 μM for most folates and antifolates at pH 5.5. The influx Km rises and the influx Vmax falls as the pH is increased, least so for the antifolate, pemetrexed. The transporter is specific for the monoglutamyl forms of folates. A variety of organic anions inhibit PCFT-mediated transport at extremely high ratio of inhibitor to folate, the most potent are sulfobromophthalein, p-aminobenzylglutamate, and sulfathalazine. This may have pharmacological relevance in terms of the inhibitory effect of these agents on the intestinal absorption of folates. The PCFT minimal promoter has been defined and contains an NRF1 response element. There is also evidence for a role of vitamin D in the regulation of PCFT with a VDR response element upstream of the minimal promoter. PCFT mRNA was reported to be increased in folate-deficient mice.

== Tissue distribution ==
PCFT is expressed in the proximal jejunum with a lower level of expression elsewhere in the intestine. Expression is localized to the apical membrane of intestinal and polarized MDCK dog kidney cells. PCFT is also expressed at the basolateral membrane of the choroid plexus. In view of the low levels of folate in the cerebrospinal fluid (CSF) in PCFT-null humans, PCFT must play a role in transport of folates across the choroid plexus into the CSF; however, the underlying mechanism for this has not been established. PCFT is expressed at the sinusoidal (basolateral) membrane of the hepatocyte, the apical brush-border membrane of the proximal tubule of the kidney, the basolateral membrane of the retinal pigment epithelium and the placenta. There is a prominent low-pH folate transport activity in the cells and/or membrane vesicles derived from these tissues which, in some cases, has been shown to be indicative of a proton-coupled folate transport process. However, it is unclear as to the extent that PCFT contributes to folate transport across these epithelia.

== Loss-of-function ==
The physiological role of PCFT is known based upon the phenotype of subjects with loss-of-function mutations of this gene – the rare autosomal hereditary disorder, hereditary folate malabsorption (HFM). These subjects have two major abnormalities: (i) severe systemic folate deficiency and (ii) a defect in the transport of folates from blood across the choroid plexus into the CSF with very low CSF folate levels even when the blood folate level is corrected or supranormal. Severe anemia, usually macrocytic, always accompanies the folate deficiency. Sometimes there is pancytopenia and/or hypogammaglobulinemia and/or T-cell dysfunction which can result in infections such as Pneumocystis jirovecii pneumonia. There can be GI signs including diarrhea and mucositis. The CNS folate deficiency is associated with a variety of neurological findings including developmental delays and seizures. The phenotype of the PCFT-null mouse has been reported and mirrors many of the findings in humans. PCFT was initially reported to be a low-affinity heme transporter. However, a role for PCFT in heme and iron homeostasis is excluded by the observation that humans or mice with loss-of-function PCFT mutations are not iron or heme deficient and the anemia, and all other systemic consequences of the loss of this transporter, are completely corrected with high-dose oral, or low-dose, parenteral folate.

== As a drug target ==
Because of the Warburg effect, and a compromised blood supply, human epithelial cancers grow within an acidic milieu, as lactate is produced during anaerobic glycolysis. Because PCFT activity is optimal at low pH, and its expression and a prominent low-pH transport activity are present in human cancers, there is interest in exploiting these properties by the development of antifolates that have a high affinity for this transporter and a very low affinity for the reduced folate carrier which delivers antifolates to normal tissues and thereby mediates the toxicity of these agents. A novel class of inhibitors of one carbon incorporation into purines is being developed with these properties. Pemetrexed, an antifolate inhibitor primarily of thymidylate synthase, is a good substrate for PCFT even at neutral pH as compared to other antifolates and folates.
