= Cerefolin =

Combination drug

Combination of
- folate: as L-methylfolate
- vitamin B12: as methylcobalamin
- vitamin B2: as riboflavin
- vitamin B6: as pyridoxine

Clinical data
- Other names: Denovo, Deplin, Duleek-DP, Elfolate, L-Methylfolate Formula, L-Methylfolate Forte, Vilofane-DP, XaQuil XR, Zervalx
- AHFS/Drugs.com: Consumer Drug Information
- Pregnancy category: Not assigned
- Routes of administration: Oral
- Drug class: Vitamin supplement

Legal status
- Legal status: AU: S4 (Prescription only); CA: ℞-only; UK: POM (Prescription only); US: ℞-only and OTC

Cerefolin is a prescription medication made by Pamlab that contains 5.635 mg of folate as L-methylfolate, 1 mg of vitamin B_{12} as methylcobalamin, 50 mg of vitamin B_{2} as riboflavin, and 5 mg of vitamin B_{6} as pyridoxine. It is approved by the U.S. Food and Drug Administration for the treatment or prevention of vitamin deficiencies.

"Cerefolin NAC" contains L-methylfolate (as Metafolin) 5.6 mg, methylcobalamin 2 mg, N-acetylcysteine 600 mg.

== Risks ==
Cerefolin is a potentially harmful drug. Adverse effects can include diarrhea, Hand-foot syndrome, Rashes, Renal stones, Constipation, headaches, flushing, and swelling.
