= Methylenetetrahydrofolate reductase deficiency =

- Other names: MTHFR deficiency

Methylenetetrahydrofolate reductase deficiency is the most common genetic cause of elevated serum levels of homocysteine (hyperhomocysteinemia). It is caused by genetic defects in MTHFR, which is an important enzyme in the methyl cycle.

Common variants of MTHFR deficiency are asymptomatic and have only minor effects on disease risk. Severe variants (from nonsense mutations) are rare.

== Symptoms and signs ==
The common MTHFR deficiencies are usually asymptomatic, although the 677T variant can cause a mildly increased risk of some diseases.

For individuals homozygous in the 677T variant, there is a mildly elevated risk of thromboembolism (odds ratio 1.2), and stroke (odds ratio 1.26). There is also an elevated risk of neural tube defects among children of individuals with the C677T polymorphism (odds ratio 1.38).

Common MTHFR deficiencies were once thought to be associated with cardiovascular risk, but meta-analyses indicate that correlation this was an artifact of publication bias.

== Causes ==
MTHFR is the rate-limiting enzyme in the methyl cycle, which includes the conversion of homocysteine into methionine. Defects in variants of MTHFR can therefore lead to hyperhomocysteinemia.

There are two common variants of MTHFR deficiency. In the more significant of the two, the individual is homozygous for the 677T polymorphism. This variant in particular is the most common genetic cause of hyperhomocysteinemia. The resulting enzyme is thermolabile and in homozygotes, enzymatic activity is depressed to 35% of its usual level. The second variant is a milder one, caused by a homologous 1298C polymorphism. This leads to 68% of the control values of enzyme activity, and it normally does not lead to low serum folate.

== Diagnosis ==
MTHFR deficiency is diagnosed by genetic testing.

== Management ==
In common forms of MTHFR deficiency, elevated plasma homocysteine levels have sometimes been treated with Vitamin B12 and low doses of folic acid. Although this treatment significantly decreases the serum levels of homocysteine, this treatment is not thought to improve health outcomes.

Due to the ineffectiveness of these treatments, it was no longer considered clinically useful to test for MTHFR in most cases of thrombophilia or recurrent pregnancy loss. A more recent evaluation from a case series recommends testing for MTHFR in case of long lasting impaired fertility and repeat miscarriages. Treatment with high doses of folic acid (5 mg/day) are deemed unsuitable for MTHFR isoform carriers, who could alternatively be treated with the metabolically active form, 5-methyltetrahydrofolate. 5-MTHF was shown to induce significantly higher plasma folate concentrations compared to folic acid in homozygous MTHFR mutation carriers in this case series.

A different study corroborates these results and suggests a physiological dose (800 μg) of 5-methyltetrahydrofolate can bypass MTHFR C677T and A1298C isoforms in couples with fertility problems. This treatment with 5-MTHF also avoids un-metabolized folic acid syndrome, which can occur with folic acid intakes of 5 mg per day.

== Prognosis ==
Whether MTHFR deficiency has any effect at all on all-cause mortality is unclear. One Dutch study showed that the MTHFR mutation was more prevalent in younger individuals (36% relative to 30%), and found that elderly men with MTHFR had an elevated mortality rate, attributable to cancer. Among women, however, no difference in life expectancy was seen. More recently, however, a meta-analysis has shown that overall cancer rates are barely increased with an odds ratio of 1.07, which suggests that an impact on mortality from cancer is small or zero.

== Epidemiology ==
The prevalence of 677T homozygosity varies with race. 18-21% of Hispanics and Southern Mediterranean populations have this variant, as do 6-14% of North American Whites and <2% of Blacks living outside of Africa.

The prevalence of the 1298C mutation is lower, at 4-12% for most tested populations.

A study in 2000 had identified 24 mutations causing severe MTHFR deficiency worldwide.

== See also ==
- Hyperhomocysteinemia
- Homocystinuria
- Cystathionine beta synthase
- DNA methylation
