= Serine hydroxymethyltransferase 2 =

Enzyme found in humans

SHMT2

Identifiers
- Aliases: SHMT2, GLYA, HEL-S-51e, SHMT, serine hydroxymethyltransferase 2, NEDCASB
- External IDs: OMIM: 138450; MGI: 1277989; GeneCards: SHMT2
Available structures
PDB	Ortholog search: PDBe RCSB
PDB	List of PDB id codes 3OU5, 4PVF
Enzyme activity
EC #	BRENDA	ExPASy	KEGG	MetaCyc
2.1.2.1	↗	↗	↗	↗

Gene location (Human)
Chr.	Chromosome 12 (human)
Band	12q13.3	Start	57,229,573 bp
Band	12q13.3	End	57,234,935 bp

Gene location (Mouse)
Chr.	Chromosome 10 (mouse)
Band	10|10 D3	Start	127,352,992 bp
Band	10|10 D3	End	127,358,313 bp
RNA expression pattern
Bgee	Human / Mouse (ortholog); Top expressed in: tendon of biceps brachii; cartilage tissue; right lobe of liver; oocyte; stromal cell of endometrium; secondary oocyte; embryo; body of pancreas; tibia; ganglionic eminence / Top expressed in: left lobe of liver; right kidney; condyle; human kidney; yolk sac; tail of embryo; proximal tubule; internal carotid artery; somite; calvaria; More reference expression data
BioGPS	n/a
Gene ontology
Molecular function	transferase activity; amino acid binding; chromatin binding; L-allo-threonine aldolase activity; protein binding; catalytic activity; identical protein binding; glycine hydroxymethyltransferase activity; pyridoxal phosphate binding; zinc ion binding; cobalt ion binding; serine binding
Cellular component	membrane; BRISC complex; microtubule cytoskeleton; mitochondrial intermembrane space; extracellular exosome; mitochondrial inner membrane; cytoplasm; mitochondrion; mitochondrial matrix; mitochondrial nucleoid; nucleus
Biological process	L-serine biosynthetic process; tetrahydrofolate interconversion; protein tetramerization; tetrahydrofolate metabolic process; protein K63-linked deubiquitination; folic acid metabolic process; glycine biosynthetic process from serine; response to type I interferon; positive regulation of cell population proliferation; glycine biosynthetic process; protein homotetramerization; one-carbon metabolic process; glycine metabolic process; L-serine metabolic process; regulation of oxidative phosphorylation; L-serine catabolic process; regulation of mitochondrial translation; regulation of aerobic respiration; cellular response to tetrahydrofolate
Sources:Amigo / QuickGO
Orthologs
Databases	NCBI: entry; OMA: entry
Species	Human	Mouse
Entrez	6472	108037
Ensembl	ENSG00000182199	ENSMUSG00000025403
UniProt	P34897	Q9CZN7
RefSeq (mRNA)	NM_001166356; NM_001166357; NM_001166358; NM_001166359; NM_005412	NM_001252316; NM_028230
RefSeq (protein)	NP_001159828; NP_001159829; NP_001159830; NP_001159831; NP_005403	NP_001239245; NP_082506
Location (UCSC)	Chr 12: 57.23 – 57.23 Mb	Chr 10: 127.35 – 127.36 Mb
PubMed search
- Wikidata
View/Edit Human	View/Edit Mouse

Serine hydroxymethyltransferase 2, also called mitochondrial serine hydroxymethyltransferase, is an enzyme that in humans is encoded by the gene SHMT2. Acting as a serine hydroxymethyltransferase, this enzyme produces 5,10-methylenetetrahydrofolate which is required for mitochondrial translation.

== Medical significance ==
Pathogenic mutations in SHMT2 are associated with neurological and cardiovascular dysfunction, called neurodevelopmental disorder with cardiomyopathy, spasticity, and brain abnormalities (NEDCASB).
