= Haladaptatus =

Scientific classification
- Domain: Archaea
- Kingdom: Methanobacteriati
- Phylum: Methanobacteriota
- Class: Halobacteria
- Order: Halobacteriales
- Family: Haladaptataceae
- Genus: Haladaptatus; Savage et al. 2007

Type species
- Haladaptatus paucihalophilus Savage et al. 2007

Species
- H. caseinilyticus; H. cibarius; H. halobius; H. litoreus; "H. marinus"; "H. ordinarius"; H. pallidirubidus; H. paucihalophilus; "H. rarus"; H. salinisoli

Synonyms
- "Haloaccomodus"

Genus of archaea

Haladaptatus (common abbreviation Hap.) is a genus of halophilic archaea in the family of Halobacteriaceae.

The members of Haladaptatus thrive in environments with salt concentrations approaching saturation

== Phylogeny ==
The currently accepted taxonomy is based on the List of Prokaryotic names with Standing in Nomenclature (LPSN) and National Center for Biotechnology Information (NCBI).

16S rRNA based LTP_07_2026

- Haladaptatus
  - H. paucihalophilus Savage et al. 2007
  - - H. pallidirubidus Liu et al. 2015
    - - - H. cibarius Roh et al. 2010
        - H. litoreus ui et al. 2010
      - - H. caseinilyticus Li et al. 2024
        - - H. halobius Xin et al. 2022
          - H. salinisoli Xin et al. 2022

53 marker proteins based GTDB 11-RS232

- Haladaptatus
  - - H. halobius Xin et al. 2022
    - H. salinisoli Xin et al. 2022
  - - H. paucihalophilus Savage et al. 2007
    - - H. caseinilyticus Li et al. 2024
      - - H. pallidirubidus Liu et al. 2015
        - - H. cibarius Roh et al. 2010
          - H. litoreus Cui et al. 2010

== See also ==
List of Archaea genera
