= Rs1801133 =

Genetic variation in the MTHFR gene

SNP: rs1801133
- Name(s): C677T, Ala222Val, A222V
- Gene: MTHFR
- Chromosome: 1

External databases
- Ensembl: Human SNPView
- dbSNP: 1801133
- HapMap: 1801133
- SNPedia: 1801133
- AlzGene: Meta-analysis; Overview
- SzGene: Meta-analysis; Overview

C677T or rs1801133 is a genetic variation—a single nucleotide polymorphism (SNP)—in the MTHFR gene.

Among Americans the frequency of T-homozygosity ranges from 1% or less among people of sub-Saharan African descent to 20% or more among Italians and Hispanics.

It has been related to

- schizophrenia
- Alzheimer's disease
- depression
- autism
- spina bifida.

In 2000 association studies on oral clefts, Down syndrome, and fetal anticonvulsant syndrome were either unreplicated or had yielded conflicting results.

== Related genetic variants ==
A1298C is a SNP in the same gene. Studies have investigated the combined effect of C677T and A1298C.
