= Serine hydroxymethyltransferase =

InterPro Family

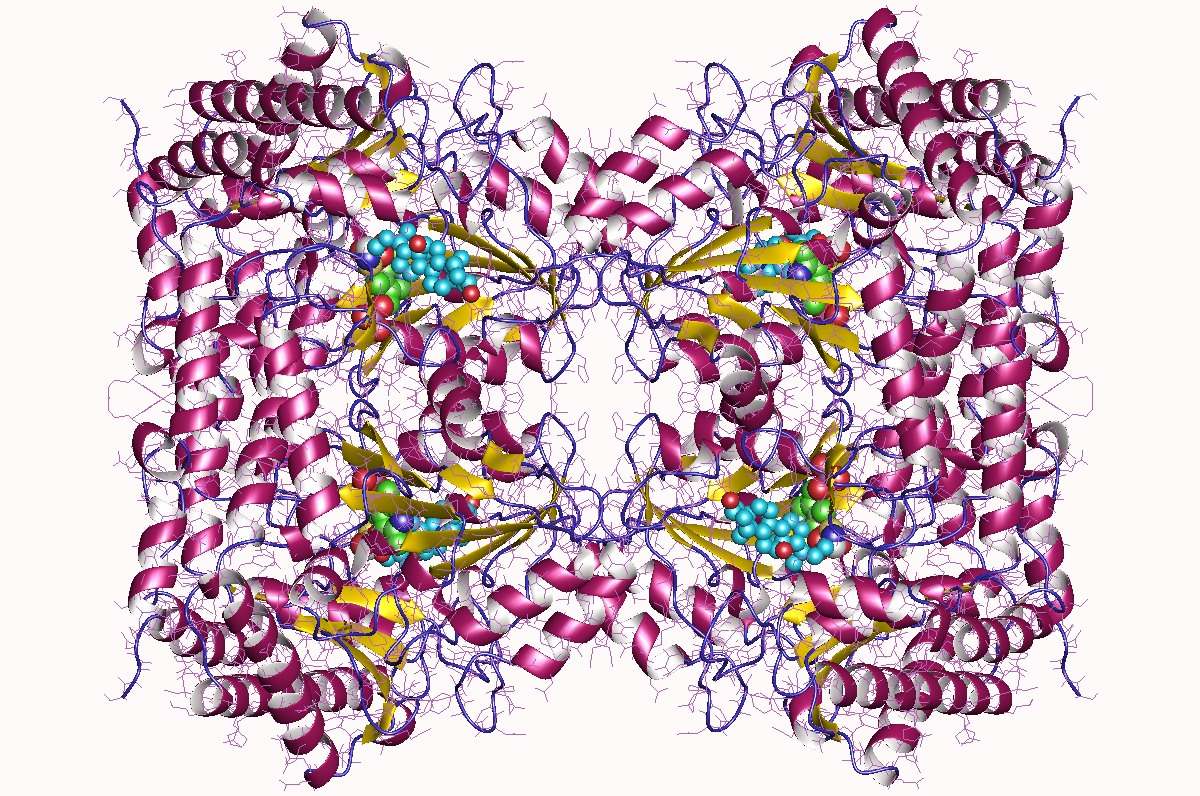
- Serine hydroxymethyltransferase 1 (cytosolic), homotetramer, Human

Identifiers
- EC no.: 2.1.2.1
- CAS no.: 9029-83-8

Databases
- BRENDA: enzyme data
- ExPASy: NiceZyme view
- KEGG: enzyme entry
- MetaCyc: metabolic pathway
- Rhea: reactions
- PDB structures: RCSB PDB PDBe PDBsum
Search
- PMC: articles
- PubMed: articles
- NCBI: proteins

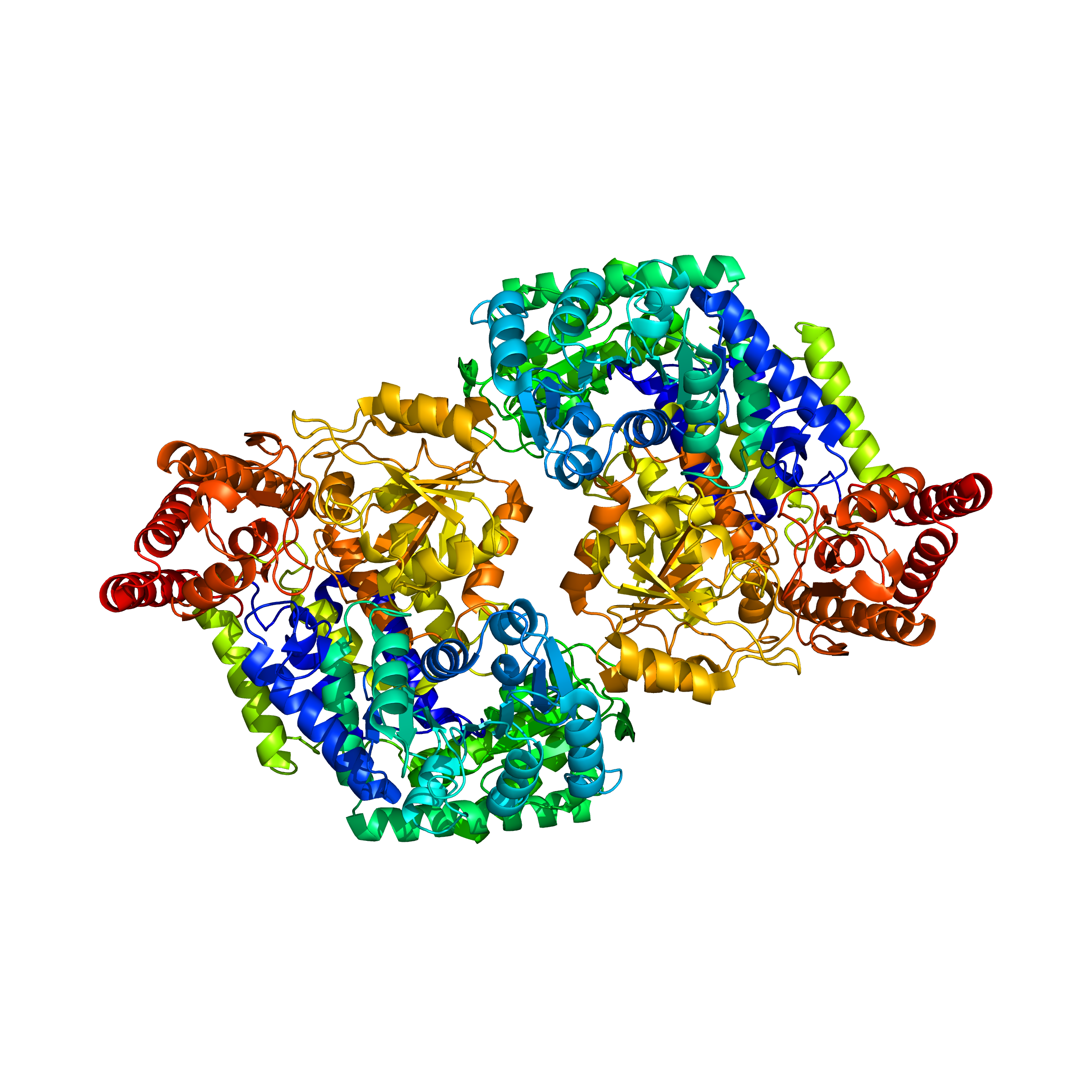
PyMol rendered crystal structure of serine hydroxymethyltransferase

Serine hydroxymethyltransferase (SHMT) is a pyridoxal phosphate (PLP) (Vitamin B_{6}) dependent enzyme (EC 2.1.2.1) which plays an important role in cellular one-carbon pathways by catalyzing the reversible, simultaneous conversions of L-serine to glycine and tetrahydrofolate (THF) to 5,10-methylenetetrahydrofolate (5,10-CH_{2}-THF). This reaction provides the largest part of the one-carbon units available to the cell.

It catalyzes the following chemical reactions:

1. 5,10-CH_{2}-THF + glycine + H_{2}O = tetrahydrofolate + L-serine; the main function.
2. 5,10-CH_{2}-THF + H_{2}O = folinic acid + H^{+}; a futile cycle with MTHFS.
3. L-threonine (or L-allothreonine) = acetaldehyde + glycine
4. L-threo-3-phenylserine = benzaldehyde + glycine
5. (3S)-3-hydroxy-N_{6},N_{6},N_{6}-trimethyl-L-lysine = 4-(trimethylamino)butanal + glycine

Humans have two forms of this enzyme, the cytosolic SHMT1 and the mitochondrial SHMT2.

== Structure ==
The structure of the SHMT monomer is similar across prokaryotes and eukaryotes, but whereas the active enzyme is a dimer in prokaryotes, the enzyme exists as a tetramer in eukaryotic cells, though the evolutionary basis for this difference in structure is unknown. However, the evolutionary path taken by SHMT going from prokaryotic dimeric form to the eukaryotic tetrameric form can be easily seen as a sort of doubling event. In other words, the eukaryotic SHMT tetramer resembles two prokaryotic dimers that have packed together, forming what has been described as a “dimer of dimers.” The interaction between two monomers within a dimer subunit has been found to occur over a greater contact area and is thus much tighter than the interaction between the two dimers. Human serine hydroxymethyltransferase 2 (SHMT2) regulates one-carbon transfer reactions required for amino acid and nucleotide metabolism, and the regulated switch between dimeric and tetrameric forms of SHMT2, which is induced by pyridoxal phosphate, has recently been shown to be involved in regulation of the BRISC deubiquitylase complex, linking metabolism to inflammation. The SHMT2 dimer, but not the PLP-bound tetramer, is a potent inhibitor of the multimeric BRISC complex, revealing a potential mechanism for SHMT2 regulation of inflammation.

A single SHMT monomer can be subdivided into three domains: an N-terminus “arm,” a “large” domain, and a “small” domain. The N-terminus arm appears to maintain the tight interaction between two monomers. The arm, consisting of two alpha helices and a beta sheet, wraps around the other monomer when in oligomeric form. The “large” domain contains the PLP binding site, as seen in other PLP-dependent proteins, like aspartate aminotransferase. The large domain in the eukaryotic form also contains a histidine that is essential for tetramer stability. All four histidines of these residues, one from each monomer, sit at the center of the tetrameric complex, where two histidines from a dimeric subunit engages in stacking interactions with the histidines of the other subunit. Prokaryotic SHMT has a proline residue rather than histidine in the equivalent position, which would in part explain why prokaryotic SHMT does not form tetramers.

The active site structure is highly conserved across eukaryotic and prokaryotic forms. The PLP is anchored by means of a lysine, which forms an aldimine Schiff base linkage with the PLP aldehyde. It has been hypothesized that a nearby tyrosine functions as the proton donor and acceptor during the transadimination step as well as the formyl transfer step and that an arginine residue engages the tyrosine side chain in a cation–π interaction, which helps to lower the pK_{a} of the tyrosine, lowering the barrier for proton transfer.

== Mechanism ==
The mechanism commonly ascribed to SHMT enzymatic activity is a transamidation followed by a cleavage of amino acid side chain from the backbone. The N-terminal amine of serine makes a nucleophilic attack on the aldimine between the SHMT lysine (Internal Aldimine) and the PLP aldehyde to form a gem-diamine, and then the N-terminal amine lone pair comes down to displace the lysine, forming a new aldimine, this time with the serine (External Aldimine). It is believed that a nearby tyrosine is responsible for much of the proton transfers that occur during the transaldimination.

A glutamate in the SHMT active site deprotonates the serine hydroxyl from the external aldimine forming a formaldehyde intermediate. Tetrahydrofolate (THF) then attacks the formaldehyde forming a carbinolamine followed by several proton transfers and dehydration of the carbinolamine, all steps facilitated by the enzyme. The methylene-THF intermediate cyclizes to 5,10-CH_{2}-THF. Lastly, the glycine external aldimine reforms before hydrolysis and release from the active site.

Once the serine is bonded to PLP, PLP triggers the α-elimination of the hydroxymethyl group of the substrate (serine). This group is released as a formaldehyde molecule because a nearby glutamate abstracts the proton from the hydroxyl group. Afterwards, the nucleophilic amine on THF attacks the free formaldehyde intermediate to make the carbinolamine intermediate. In the second case, the nucleophilic amines on THF attack the serine side chain carbon, simultaneously forming a carbinolamine intermediate on the THF and a quinoid intermediate with the PLP. However, THF is not an obligate substrate for SHMT, meaning the cleavage of serine and other β-hydroxy amino acids (such as threonine) can occur without the presence of THF and, in this case, the mechanism is a retro-aldol cleavage. Also, it seems that the subsequent dehydration of the carbinolamine intermediate to form the methylene bridge and fully cyclize into 5,10-CH_{2}-THF is not catalyzed by the enzyme and this reaction may occur spontaneously. In fact, this conversion could occur outside the enzyme, but a study shows that this reaction is faster and thermodynamically favourable when occurs inside the SHMT aided by the Glu57 residue. Moreover, the cyclisation of the carbinolamine intermediate to form 5,10-CH_{2}-THF is essential to Glu57 restore its proton that is used to protonate the quinonoid intermediate and complete the catalytic cycle.

== Clinical significance ==
Folate metabolism has already been the subject of chemotherapeutic strategies, but SHMT inhibition, while researched, had not really been taken advantage of in commercial anticancer drugs. However, because the folates used by folate metabolic and folate-dependent enzymes are all very similar in structure and folate mimics are already common in medical use, it has not been difficult to find potential molecular structures that may inhibit SHMT. For example, pemetrexed is already used as an antifolate to treat mesothelioma and was found to be an effective inhibitor of SHMT and screening other antifolates revealed lometrexol as another effective inhibitor of SHMT.

SHMT has also undergone investigation as a potential target for antimalarial drugs. Research indicates that the active site environment of Plasmodium SHMTs (PSHMTs) differs from that of human cytosolic SHMT, allowing for the possibility of selective inhibition of PSHMT and, thus, the treatment of malaria infections. In particular, certain pyrazolopyran molecules have been shown to have a selective nanomolar efficacy against PSHMTs. Poor pharmacokinetics, however, have prevented these pyrazolopyrans from being effective in living models.

== Isoforms ==
serine hydroxymethyltransferase 1

Identifiers
- Symbol: SHMT1
- NCBI gene: 6470
- HGNC: 10850
- OMIM: 182144
- RefSeq: NM_004169
- UniProt: P34896

Other data
- EC number: 2.1.2.1
- Locus: Chr. 17 p11.2
Search for
- Structures: Swiss-model
- Domains: InterPro

serine hydroxymethyltransferase 2

Identifiers
- Symbol: SHMT2
- Alt. symbols: SHMT
- NCBI gene: 6472
- HGNC: 10852
- OMIM: 138450
- RefSeq: NM_005412
- UniProt: P34897

Other data
- EC number: 2.1.2.1
- Locus: Chr. 12 q13.3
Search for
- Structures: Swiss-model
- Domains: InterPro

Bacteria such as Escherichia coli and Bacillus stearothermophilus have versions of this enzyme and there appear to be two isoforms of SHMT in mammals, one in the cytoplasm (cSHMT) and another in the mitochondria (mSHMT). Plants may have an additional SHMT isoform within chloroplasts.

In mammals, the enzyme is a tetramer of four identical subunits of approximately 50,000 daltons each. The intact holoenzyme has a molecular weight of approximately 200,000 daltons and incorporates four molecules of PLP as a coenzyme.

=== SHMT1 ===
Cytosolic serine hydroxymethyltransferase, also called serine hydroxymethyltransferase 1 is the form of this enzyme that in humans is encoded by the gene SHMT1. It often localizes in the cytoplasm but localizes to the nucleus during the S phase, and remains in the nucleus during the G2/M phase. In addition to its function as a hydroxymethyltrasferase, it also catalyzes the cleavage of a number of 3-hydroxy amino acids, and can act as a hydroxytrimethyllysine aldolase (HTML) as part of the carnitine biosynthesis pathway. It also has RNA binding activity, and regulates SHMT2 mRNA translation.

Unlike SHMT2, this enzyme can catalyze either the forward or backward direction of:

(6R)-5,10-methylene-5,6,7,8-tetrahydrofolate + glycine + H_{2}O = (6S)-5,6,7,8-tetrahydrofolate + L-serine

=== SHMT2 ===
Mitochondrial serine hydroxymethyltransferase, also called serine hydroxymethyltransferase 2 is the form of this enzyme that in humans is encoded by the gene SHMT2. This protein mainly localizes to the mitochondria, but can also be found in the cytoplasm and nucleus as part of the BRISC complex. This complex is involved in deubiquitinating proteins such as IFNAR1. SHMT2's production of 5,10-methylenetetrahydrofolate is required for mitochondrial translation.

This enzyme has only been found to catalyze the backward direction of:

(6R)-5,10-methylene-5,6,7,8-tetrahydrofolate + glycine + H_{2}O = (6S)-5,6,7,8-tetrahydrofolate + L-serine

== Other reactions ==
As well as its primary role in folate metabolism, SHMT also catalyzes other reactions that may be biologically significant, including the conversion of 5,10-Methenyltetrahydrofolate to 10-Formyltetrahydrofolate. When coupled with C_{1}-tetrahydrofolate synthase and tetrahydropteroate, cSHMT also catalyzes the conversion of formate to serine.

== Role in smith–magenis syndrome ==
Smith–Magenis syndrome (SMS) is a rare disorder that manifests as a complex set of traits including facial abnormalities, unusual behaviors, and developmental delay. It results from an interstitial deletion within chromosome 17p11.2, including the cSHMT gene and a small study showed SHMT activity in SMS patients was ~50% of normal. Reduced SHMT would result in a reduced glycine pool, which could affect the nervous system by reducing the functioning of NMDA receptors. This could be a potential mechanism for explaining SMS.

== Figures ==
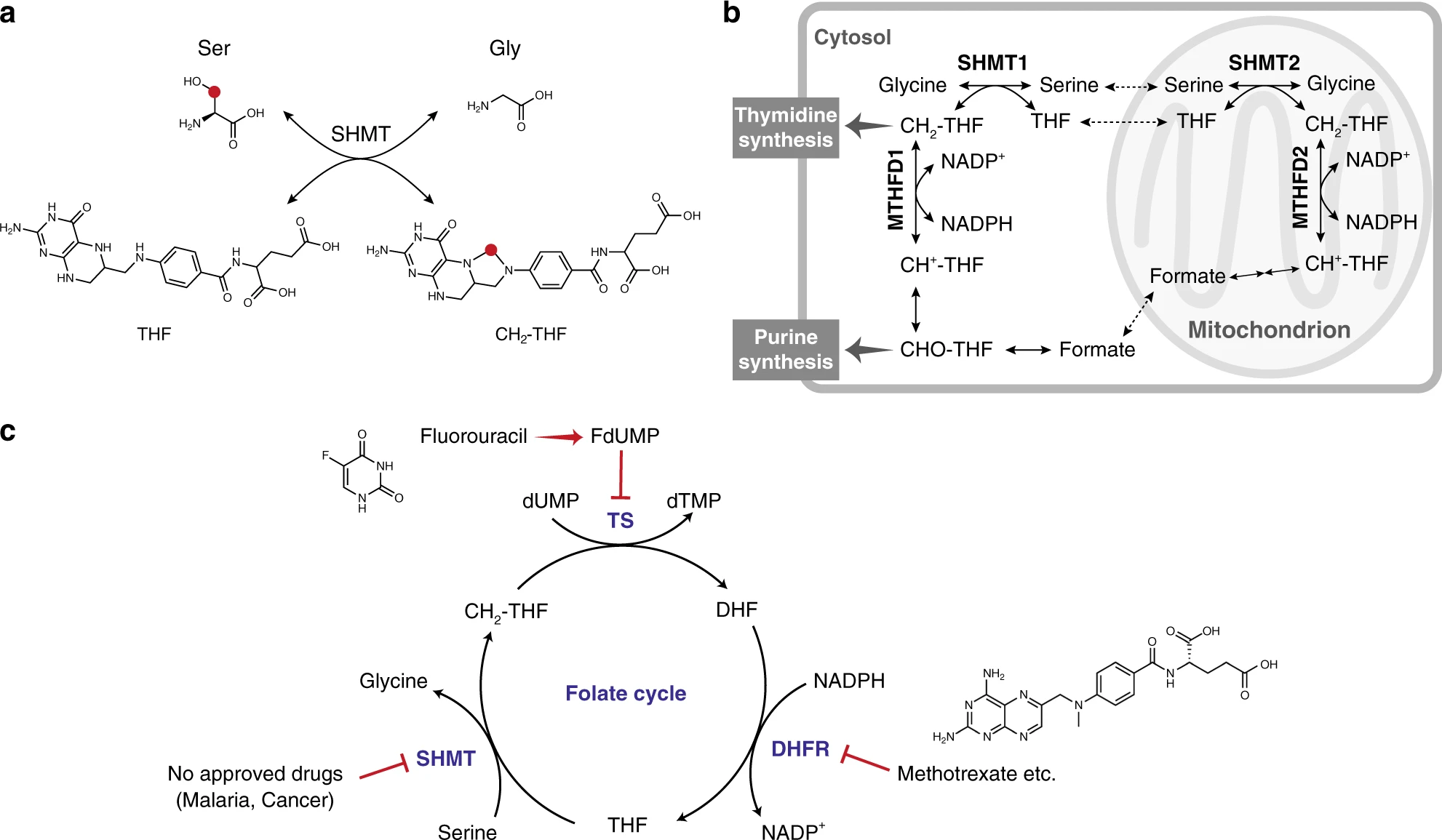
Biological role of SHMT: a) Serine–glycine interconversion catalyzed by SHMT. THF = tetrahydrofolate, CH2-THF = N-5,N-10-methylenetetrahydrofolate. The red dot highlights the carbon that is transferred from Ser to THF. b) Schematic overview of human SHMT (hSHMT) function. MTHFD = methylenetetrahydrofolate dehydrogenase-cyclohydrolase, CH2-THF = N-5,N-10-methylenetetrahydrofolate, CH+-THF = 5,10-methenyltetrahydrofolate, CHO-THF = 10-formyltetrahydrofolate, NADP+ = Nicotinamide adenine dinucleotide phosphate, NADPH = NADP+ reduced form. c) SHMT, dihydrofolate reductase (DHFR), and thymidylate synthase (TS) in the folate cycle. THF = tetrahydrofolate, CH2-THF = 5,10-methylenetetrahydrofolate, DHF = dihydrofolate, FdUMP = fluorodeoxyuridine-5′-monophosphate, dUMP = deoxyuridine monophosphate, dTMP = deoxythymidine monophosphate. From Nonaka et al., 2019.
