= GeneReviews =

Academic database

GeneReviews is an online database containing standardized peer-reviewed articles that describe specific heritable diseases. It was established in 1997 as GeneClinics by Roberta A Pagon (University of Washington) with funding from the National Institutes of Health. Its focus is primarily on single-gene disorders, providing current disorder-specific information on diagnosis, management, and genetic counseling. Links to disease-specific and/or general consumer resources are included in each article when available. The database is published on the National Center for Biotechnology Information Bookshelf site. Articles are updated every four to five years or as needed, and revised whenever significant changes in clinically relevant information occur. Articles are searchable by author, title, gene, and name of disease or protein, and are available free of charge.
