= Methylenetetrahydrofolate reductase =

Rate-limiting enzyme in the methyl cycle

MTHFR

Identifiers
- Aliases: MTHFR, entrez:4524, methylenetetrahydrofolate reductase
- External IDs: OMIM: 607093; MGI: 106639; HomoloGene: 4349; GeneCards: MTHFR; OMA:MTHFR - orthologs

Gene location (Human)
Chr.	Chromosome 1 (human)
Band	1p36.22	Start	11,785,723 bp
Band	1p36.22	End	11,806,455 bp

Gene location (Mouse)
Chr.	Chromosome 4 (mouse)
Band	4 E1|4 78.67 cM	Start	148,123,534 bp
Band	4 E1|4 78.67 cM	End	148,144,008 bp
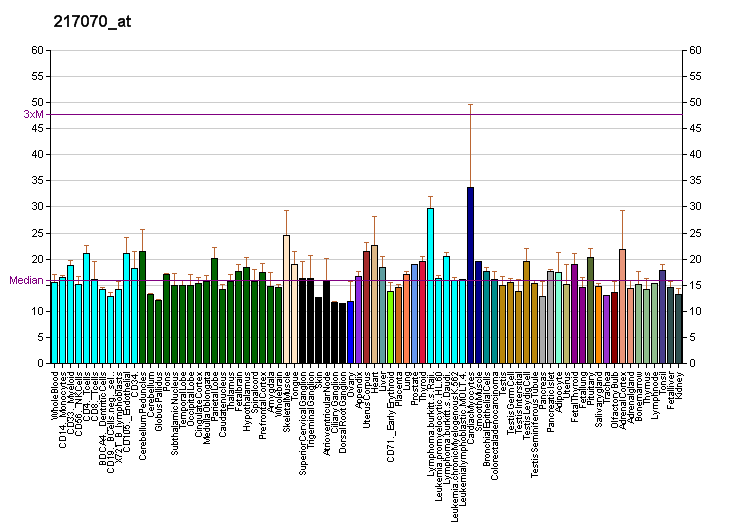

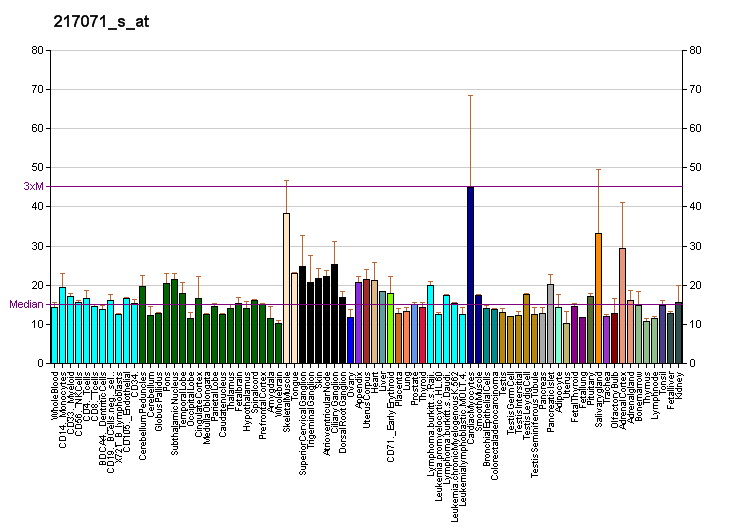

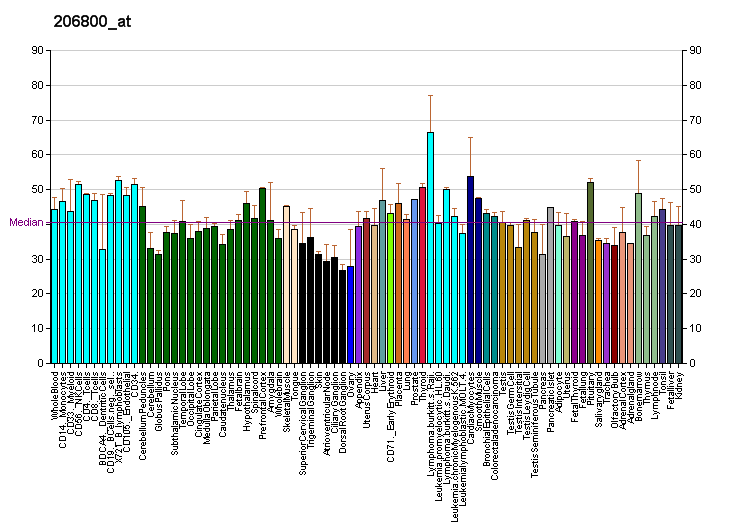
RNA expression pattern
Bgee	Human / Mouse (ortholog); Top expressed in: corpus epididymis; sural nerve; apex of heart; right auricle of heart; right ovary; granulocyte; gastric mucosa; left ovary; left ventricle; muscle of thigh / Top expressed in: saccule; lacrimal gland; otic vesicle; stroma of bone marrow; retinal pigment epithelium; spermatocyte; calvaria; prostate; sciatic nerve; spermatid; More reference expression data
BioGPS	More reference expression data
Gene ontology
Molecular function	flavin adenine dinucleotide binding; methylenetetrahydrofolate reductase (NAD(P)H) activity; modified amino acid binding; catalytic activity; NADP binding; oxidoreductase activity; protein-containing complex binding
Cellular component	cytosol; synapse
Biological process	response to amino acid; response to interleukin-1; response to hypoxia; cellular amino acid metabolic process; tetrahydrofolate interconversion; S-adenosylmethionine metabolic process; blood circulation; tetrahydrofolate metabolic process; methionine metabolic process; regulation of histone methylation; response to vitamin B2; folic acid metabolic process; homocysteine metabolic process; response to folic acid; metabolism
Sources:Amigo / QuickGO
Orthologs
Species	Human	Mouse
Entrez	4524	17769
Ensembl	ENSG00000177000	ENSMUSG00000029009
UniProt	P42898	Q9WU20
RefSeq (mRNA)	NM_005957; NM_001330358	NM_001161798; NM_010840
RefSeq (protein)	NP_001317287; NP_005948	NP_001155270; NP_034970
Location (UCSC)	Chr 1: 11.79 – 11.81 Mb	Chr 4: 148.12 – 148.14 Mb
PubMed search
- Wikidata
View/Edit Human	View/Edit Mouse

Methylenetetrahydrofolate reductase (MTHFR) is the rate-limiting enzyme in the methyl cycle, and it is encoded by the MTHFR gene. Methylenetetrahydrofolate reductase catalyzes the conversion of 5,10-methylenetetrahydrofolate to 5-methyltetrahydrofolate, a cosubstrate for homocysteine remethylation to methionine. Natural variation in this gene is common in otherwise healthy people. Although some variants have been reported to influence susceptibility to occlusive vascular disease, neural tube defects, Alzheimer's disease and other forms of dementia, colon cancer, and acute leukemia, findings from small early studies have not been reproduced. Some mutations in this gene are associated with methylenetetrahydrofolate reductase deficiency. Complex I deficiency with recessive spastic paraparesis has also been linked to MTHFR variants. In addition, the aberrant promoter hypermethylation of this gene is associated with male infertility and recurrent spontaneous abortion.

== Biochemistry ==
methylene tetrahydrofolate reductase [NAD(P)H]
- Schematic diagram of the reductive carbon–nitrogen bond cleavage (represented by wavy line) catalyzed by methylenetetrahydrofolate reductase.

Identifiers
- EC no.: 1.5.1.20
- CAS no.: 9028-69-7

Databases
- IntEnz: IntEnz view
- BRENDA: BRENDA entry
- ExPASy: NiceZyme view
- KEGG: KEGG entry
- MetaCyc: metabolic pathway
- PRIAM: profile
- PDB structures: RCSB PDB PDBe PDBsum
- Gene Ontology: AmiGO / QuickGO
Search
- PMC: articles
- PubMed: articles
- NCBI: proteins

In the rate-limiting step of the methyl cycle, MTHFR irreversibly reduces 5,10-methylenetetrahydrofolate (substrate) to 5-methyltetrahydrofolate (product).

- 5,10-methylene tetrahydrofolate is used to convert dUMP to dTMP for de novo thymidine synthesis.
- 5-Methyltetrahydrofolate is used to convert homocysteine (a potentially toxic amino acid) to methionine by the enzyme methionine synthase. (Note that homocysteine can also be converted to methionine by the folate-independent enzyme betaine-homocysteine methyltransferase (BHMT).)

MTHFR contains a bound flavin cofactor and uses NAD(P)H as the reducing agent.

== Structure ==
Mammalian MTHFR is composed of an N-terminal catalytic domain and a C-terminal regulatory domain. MTHFR has at least two promoters and two isoforms (70 kDa and 77 kDa).

== Regulation ==
MTHFR activity may be inhibited by binding of dihydrofolate (DHF) and S-adenosyl methionine (SAM, or AdoMet). MTHFR can also be phosphorylated – this decreases its activity by ~20% and allows it to be more easily inhibited by SAM.

== Genetics ==
The enzyme is coded by the gene with the symbol MTHFR on chromosome 1 location p36.3 in humans. There are DNA sequence variants (genetic polymorphisms) associated with this gene.

In 2000 a report brought the number of polymorphisms up to 24.

Two of the most investigated are C677T (rs1801133) and A1298C (rs1801131) single nucleotide polymorphisms (SNPs).

While multiple published studies have drawn relationships between these SNPs and a wide variety of diseases, the American College of Medical Genetics has issued an official Practice Guideline recommending against testing or reporting on these two variants, citing "Recent meta-analyses have disproven an association between hyperhomocysteinemia and risk for coronary heart disease and between MTHFR polymorphism status and risk for venous thromboembolism. There is growing evidence that MTHFR polymorphism testing has minimal clinical utility.". However, a more recent study has shown that the presence of the C677T and/or A1298C polymorphisms may have a critical impact on leukemic cell response to MYC-targeting therapies. This study demonstrates that MTHFR deficiency indeed increases leukemic cell resistance to a variety of MYC-targeting pharmacological agents, including BET protein small-molecule inhibitors.

=== C677T SNP (Ala^{222}Val) ===
The MTHFR nucleotide at position 677 in the gene has two possibilities: C (cytosine) or T (thymine). C at position 677 (leading to an alanine at amino acid 222) is the reference allele. The 677T allele (leading to a valine substitution at amino acid 222) encodes a thermolabile alternative enzyme variant with reduced activity. Both reference and alternative genotypes are common, with the alternative allele frequency at 10-35%, depending on ancestry.

Individuals with two copies of 677C (677CC) have the most common genotype. 677TT individuals (homozygous) have lower MTHFR activity than CC or CT (heterozygous) individuals. About ten percent of the North American population are T-homozygous for this polymorphism. There is ethnic variability in the frequency of the T allele – frequency in Mediterranean/Hispanics is greater than the frequency in Caucasians which, in turn, is greater than in Africans/African-Americans.

The degree of enzyme thermolability (assessed as residual activity after heat inactivation) is much greater in 677TT individuals (18–22%) compared with 677CT (56%) and 677CC (66–67%). Individuals of 677TT are predisposed to mild hyperhomocysteinemia (high blood homocysteine levels), because they have less active MTHFR available to produce 5-methyltetrahydrofolate (which is used to decrease homocysteine). Low dietary intake of the vitamin folate can also cause mild hyperhomocysteinemia.

Low folate intake affects individuals with the 677TT genotype to a greater extent than those with the 677CC/CT genotypes. 677TT (but not 677CC/CT) individuals with lower plasma folate levels are at risk for elevated plasma homocysteine levels. In studies of human recombinant MTHFR, the protein encoded by 677T loses its FAD cofactor three times faster than the wild-type protein. 5-Methyl-THF slows the rate of FAD release in both the wild-type and mutant enzymes, although it is to a much greater extent in the mutant enzyme. Low folate status with the consequent loss of FAD enhances the thermolability of the enzyme, thus providing an explanation for the normalised homocysteine and DNA methylation levels in folate-replete 677TT individuals.

This polymorphism and mild hyperhomocysteinemia are associated with neural tube defects in offspring, increased risk for complications of pregnancy other complications of pregnancy, arterial and venous thrombosis, and cardiovascular disease. 677TT individuals are at an increased risk for acute lymphoblastic leukemia and colon cancer.

Mutations in the MTHFR gene could be one of the factors leading to increased risk of developing schizophrenia. Schizophrenic patients having the risk allele (T\T) show more deficiencies in executive function tasks.

The C677T genotype used to be associated with increased risk of recurrent pregnancy loss (RPL) in non Caucasians, however this link has been disproved in recent years. The American College of Medical Genetics recommendation guidelines currently state that people with recurrent pregnancy loss should not be tested for variants in the MTHFR gene.

There is also a tentative link between MTHFR mutations and dementia. One study of an elderly Japanese population found correlations between the MTHFR 677CT mutation, an Apo E polymorphism, and certain types of senile dementia. Other research has found that individuals with folate-related mutations can still have a functional deficiency even when blood levels of folate are within the normal range, and recommended supplementation of methyltetrahydrofolate to potentially prevent and treat dementia (along with depression). A 2011 study from China also found that the C677T SNP was associated with Alzheimer's disease in Asian populations (though not in Caucasians).

C677T polymorphism is associated with risk of myocardial infarction in African, North American, and elderly populations.

The CDC provides a web page with information on the "MTHFR Gene, Folic Acid, and Preventing Neural Tube Defects". National Center on Birth Defects and Developmental Disabilities, Centers for Disease Control and Prevention. 27 May 2025.

=== A1298C SNP (Glu^{429}Ala) ===
At nucleotide 1298 of the MTHFR, there are two possibilities: A or C. 1298A (leading to a Glu at amino acid 429) is the most common while 1298C (leading to an Ala substitution at amino acid 429) is less common. 1298AA is the "normal" homozygous, 1298AC the heterozygous, and 1298CC the homozygous for the "variant". In studies of human recombinant MTHFR, the protein encoded by 1298C cannot be distinguished from 1298A in terms of activity, thermolability, FAD release, or the protective effect of 5-methyl-THF. The C mutation does not appear to affect the MTHFR protein. It does not result in thermolabile MTHFR and does not appear to affect homocysteine levels. It does, however, affect the conversion of MTHF to BH4 (tetrahydrobiopterin), an important cofactor in the production of neurotransmitters, and the synthesis of nitric oxide.

There has been some commentary on a 'reverse reaction' in which tetrahydrobiopterin (BH4) is produced when 5-methyltetrahydrofolate is converted back into methylenetetrahydrofolate. This however is not universally agreed upon. That reaction is thought to require 5-MTHF and SAMe. An alternative opinion is that 5-MTHF processes peroxynitrite, thereby preserving existing BH4, and that no such 'reverse reaction' occurs.

A maternal MTHFR A1298C polymorphism is associated with Down syndrome pregnancy. Subgroup and sensitivity analysis results showed that this polymorphism is a risk factor for Down syndrome pregnancy in Asian populations but not in Caucasian population as well as in overall meta-analysis.

MTHFR A1298C may play a role as either a driver in the development of major depressive disorder or as a predictive or diagnostic marker, possibly in combination with C677T.

=== Detection of MTHFR polymorphisms ===
A triplex tetra-primer ARMS-PCR method was developed for the simultaneous detection of C677T and A1298C polymorphisms with the A66G MTRR polymorphism in a single PCR reaction.

=== Severe MTHFR deficiency ===
Severe MTHFR deficiency is rare (about 50 cases worldwide) and caused by mutations resulting in 0–20% residual enzyme activity. Patients exhibit developmental delay, motor and gait dysfunction, seizures, and neurological impairment and have extremely high levels of homocysteine in their plasma and urine as well as low to normal plasma methionine levels. This deficiency and mutations in MTHFR have also been linked to recessive spastic paraparesis with complex I deficiency.

A study on the Chinese Uyghur population indicated that rs1801131 polymorphism in MTHFR was associated with nsCL/P in Chinese Uyghur population. Given the unique genetic and environmental characters of the Uyghur population, these findings may be helpful for exploring the pathogenesis of this complex disease.

== Epigenetics ==
The MTHFR aberrant promoter hypermethylation is associated with male infertility. Furthermore, this improper epigenetic phenomenon was observed in semen samples of infertile males belonging to couples with a history of recurrent spontaneous abortion. The MTHFR improper promoter hypermethylation may affect the two essential roles of DNA methylation in spermatogenetic cells, the global genome methylation process and the genomic imprinting of paternal genes. In addition, MTHFR gene promoter hypermethylation has also been associated with methylation loss at H19 imprinted gene in semen samples from infertile males.

== As a drug target ==
Inhibitors of MTHFR and antisense knockdown of the expression of the enzyme have been proposed as treatments for cancer. The active form of folate, L-methylfolate, may be appropriate to target for conditions affected by MTHFR polymorphisms.

== Reaction and metabolism ==
The overall reaction catalyzed by MTHFR is illustrated on the right. The reaction uses an NAD(P)H hydride donor and an FAD cofactor. The E. coli enzyme has a strong preference for the NADH donor, whereas the mammalian enzyme is specific to NADPH.

MTHFR metabolism: folate cycle, methionine cycle, trans-sulfuration and hyperhomocysteinemia. 5-MTHF: 5-methyltetrahydrofolate; 5,10-methylenetetrahydrofolate; BAX: Bcl-2-associated X protein; BHMT: betaine-homocysteine S-methyltransferase; CBS: cystathionine beta synthase; CGL: cystathionine gamma-lyase; DHF: dihydrofolate (vitamin B9); DMG: dimethylglycine; dTMP: thymidine monophosphate; dUMP: deoxyuridine monophosphate; FAD^{+} flavine adenine dicucleotide; FTHF: 10-formyltetrahydrofolate; MS: methionine synthase; MTHFR: mehtylenetetrahydrofolate reductase; SAH: S-adenosyl-L-homocysteine; SAM (SAMe): S-adenosyl-L-methionine; THF: tetrahydrofolate.

Click on genes, proteins and metabolites below to link to respective articles. (Note: The interactive pathway map can be edited at WikiPathways: "FluoropyrimidineActivity_WP1601".)

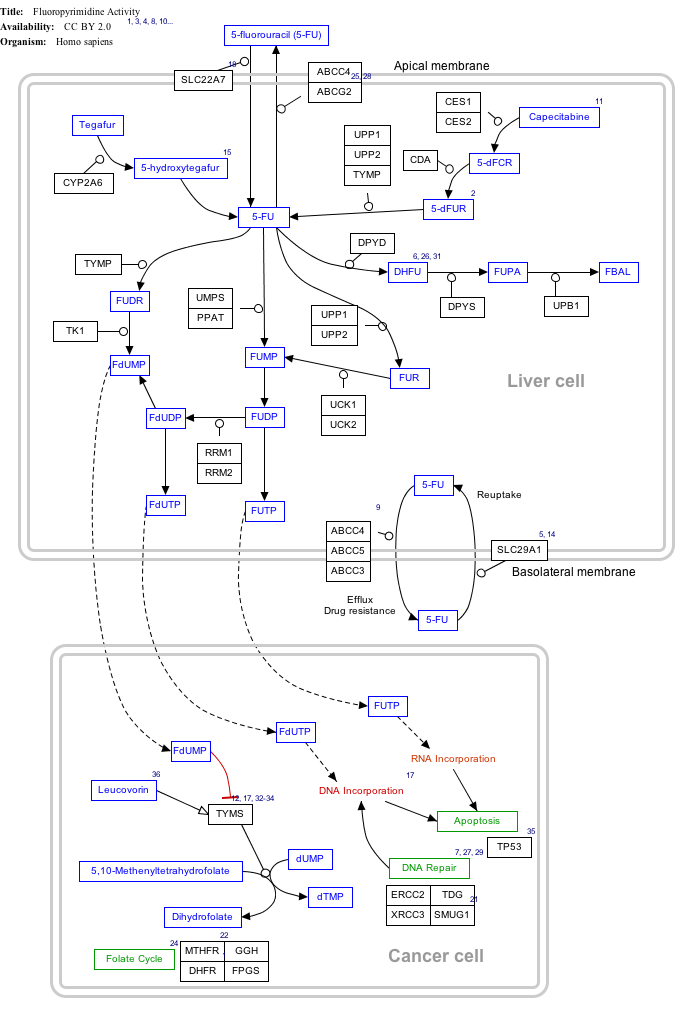

Fluorouracil (5-FU) Activity edit

== Alternative medicine ==
With the growth of direct-to-consumer genetic testing, the alternative medicine industry has aggressively targeted a range of dubious tests and highly profitable quack treatments for claimed MTHFR polymorphisms, despite the lack of any demonstrated health effects of these mutations. The promotion of supplements and other treatments for MTHFR polymorphisms, especially centered on autistic spectrum disorder, have been characterised as "snake oil". Tests for MTHFR, while gaining popularity, are generally unnecessary because the association of MTHFR gene mutations with various diseases have not been established as clear-cut cause-and-effect relationship.

== See also ==
- DNA methylation
- Methylenetetrahydrofolate reductase deficiency
- TEAD2
