= 5-formyltetrahydrofolate cyclo-ligase =

Class of enzymes

5-Formyltetrahydrofolate cyclo-ligase

Identifiers
- EC no.: 6.3.3.2
- CAS no.: 37318-64-2

Databases
- BRENDA: enzyme data
- ExPASy: NiceZyme view
- KEGG: enzyme entry
- MetaCyc: metabolic pathway
- Rhea: reactions
- PDB structures: RCSB PDB PDBe PDBsum
- Gene Ontology: AmiGO / QuickGO
Search
- PMC: articles
- PubMed: articles
- NCBI: proteins

In enzymology, a 5-formyltetrahydrofolate cyclo-ligase (EC 6.3.3.2) is an enzyme that catalyzes the chemical reaction

ATP + 5-formyltetrahydrofolate (folinic acid) $\rightleftharpoons$ ADP + phosphate + 5,10-methenyltetrahydrofolate

Thus, the two substrates of this enzyme are ATP and 5-formyltetrahydrofolate, whereas its 3 products are ADP, phosphate, and 5,10-methenyltetrahydrofolate.

This enzyme belongs to the family of ligases, specifically the cyclo-ligases, which form carbon-nitrogen bonds. The systematic name of this enzyme class is 5-formyltetrahydrofolate cyclo-ligase (ADP-forming). Other names in common use include 5,10-methenyltetrahydrofolate synthetase (MTHFS), formyltetrahydrofolic cyclodehydrase, and 5-formyltetrahydrofolate cyclodehydrase. This enzyme participates in one carbon pool by folate.

== Structural studies ==
As of late 2007, 5 structures have been solved for this class of enzymes, with PDB accession codes PDB: 1SBQ, PDB: 1SOU, PDB: 1U3F, PDB: 1U3G, and PDB: 2JCB.

== Human gene ==
MTHFS

Identifiers
- Aliases: MTHFS, HsT19268, 5,10-methenyltetrahydrofolate synthetase (5-formyltetrahydrofolate cyclo-ligase), methenyltetrahydrofolate synthetase, NEDMEHM
- External IDs: OMIM: 604197; MGI: 3780550; GeneCards: MTHFS
Available structures
PDB	Human UniProt search: PDBe RCSB
PDB	List of PDB id codes 3HY4, 3HXT, 3HY3, 3HY6
Enzyme activity
EC #	BRENDA	ExPASy	KEGG	MetaCyc
6.3.3.2	↗	↗	↗	↗

Gene location (Human)
Chr.	Chromosome 15 (human)
Band	15q25.1	Start	79,833,585 bp
Band	15q25.1	End	79,897,379 bp

Gene location (Mouse)
Chr.	Chromosome 9 (mouse)
Band	9 E3.1|9	Start	88,570,655 bp
Band	9 E3.1|9	End	88,602,349 bp
RNA expression pattern
Bgee	Human / Mouse (ortholog); Top expressed in: right lobe of liver; monocyte; blood; duodenum; body of pancreas; renal cortex; pituitary gland; human kidney; C1 segment; anterior pituitary / Top expressed in: right kidney; proximal tubule; granulocyte; exocrine gland; hepatobiliary system; liver; neural layer of retina; human kidney; white adipose tissue; lens; More reference expression data
BioGPS	n/a
Gene ontology
Molecular function	folic acid binding; ligase activity; ATP binding; metal ion binding; nucleotide binding; 5-formyltetrahydrofolate cyclo-ligase activity
Cellular component	mitochondrial matrix; cytoplasm; cytosol; mitochondrion
Biological process	tetrahydrofolate metabolic process; glutamate metabolic process; formate metabolic process; folic acid-containing compound biosynthetic process; tetrahydrofolate interconversion; folic acid catabolic process; folic acid metabolic process
Sources:Amigo / QuickGO
Orthologs
Databases	NCBI: entry; OMA: entry
Species	Human	Mouse
Entrez	10588	100039707
Ensembl	ENSG00000136371	ENSMUSG00000079427
UniProt	P49914	n/a
RefSeq (mRNA)	NM_001199758; NM_006441	NM_001128601; NM_001359992
RefSeq (protein)	NP_001186687; NP_006432	n/a
Location (UCSC)	Chr 15: 79.83 – 79.9 Mb	Chr 9: 88.57 – 88.6 Mb
PubMed search
- Wikidata
View/Edit Human	View/Edit Mouse

The human version of the enzyme is known as the 5,10-methenyltetrahydrofolate synthetase, gene symbol MTHFS.

=== Role in pathology ===
Mutations of the MTHFS gene cause the disease 5,10-methenyltetrahydrofolate synthetase deficiency.
