= CDA =

CDA, Cda, or CdA may refer to:

== In education ==
- Central Delta Academy, a private school in Mississippi
- Certified dental assistant, in the United States
- Child Development Associate, a credential in the early care and education
- Communicative Disorders Assistant, a credential in assisting a registered Audiologist or Speech Language Pathologist, in Canada
- Coram Deo Academy, a private Christian school in Flower Mound, Texas

== In law and government ==
=== Government agencies ===
- Capital Development Authority, a kind of government entity
  - Capital Development Authority (Islamabad), the Capital Development Authority of Pakistan
- Combined Development Agency, a uranium purchasing authority run by the US and UK government from 1948
- Canadian Defence Academy, an organization in the Canadian Forces

=== Laws ===
- Communications Decency Act, a US law found partially unconstitutional
- Crime and Disorder Act 1998, a UK law
- Contagious Diseases Acts, three UK laws

=== Other uses in law and government ===
- Chargé d'Affaires
- Confidential disclosure agreement
- Criminal defense attorney

== Organizations ==
=== Political parties and lobbying groups ===
- Christian Democratic Alliance (South Africa)
- Christian Democrats of America, a Christian democratic organization in the US
- Christian Democratic Appeal, a Christian democratic party in the Netherlands
- College Democrats of America, the official youth outreach arm of the US Democratic Party
- Conservative Democratic Alliance, in the UK

=== Other organizations ===
- Catholic Daughters of the Americas, a Catholic women's charitable organization
- Canadian Dental Association, an association of dentists in Canada
- Diabetes Canada, which was known until 2017 as the Canadian Diabetes Association
- Chittagong Development Authority
- Club de Deportes Antofagasta, a Chilean football club
- Chinese Daoist Association

== In science and technology ==
=== In chemistry ===
- Chiral derivatizing agent, a type of chemical designed to react with enantiomers to indicate the enantiopurity
- Completely denatured alcohol, the most heavily denatured alcohol

=== In computing ===
- ".cda", a filename extension for a Compact Disc Audio track
- Cellular digital accessory, a means to identify the software version of a mobile phone
- Red Book (audio CD standard), Compact Disc Audio, the standard format for a CD
- Content Delivery Application, a component of a typical content management system

=== In health and medicine ===
- Canadian Dental Association, an association of dentists in Canada
- Diabetes Canada, which was known until 2017 as the Canadian Diabetes Association
- Chlorproguanil/dapsone/artesunate, an antimalarial drug
- Clinical Document Architecture, a healthcare documentation standard
- Congenital dyserythropoietic anemia, a blood condition
- Cytidine deaminase, an enzyme
- Communicative disorders assistant, a profession

=== In spaceflight ===
- Command and data acquisition station, in spacecraft operations
- Cosmic dust analyzer, an instrument on the Cassini–Huygens spacecraft

=== In mathematics ===
- Cantor's diagonal argument, a proof technique in set theory

=== Other uses on science and technology ===
- Canonical discriminant analysis, a type of linear discriminant analysis
- Cda, abbreviation for the orchid genus Cochlioda, a synonym of Oncidium
- Continuous descent approach, an aircraft approach method designed to reduce fuel burn and noise
- Controlled droplet application, a concept for improving the efficiency of pesticide application
- CdA or drag area, the product of the drag coefficient and a reference area
  - CdA, the drag area in automobile aerodynamics
- Current differencing amplifier, amplifier taking current difference as input and voltage as output
- Clean dry air, a compressed air quality fulfilling the requirements of ISO 8573-1:2010 Class 0.

== Other uses ==
- Child Detection Agency, in the 2001 animated film Monsters, Inc.
- Caran d'Ache (company), a Swiss fine arts products company
- Cardinia Road railway station, Melbourne
- Coeur d'Alene (disambiguation), multiple meanings
- Compañia Dominicana de Aviación, an airline from the Dominican Republic
- Critical discourse analysis, in critical theory
- Chantiers de l'Atlantique, French shipyard
- Compressed Dry Air, term used in manufacturing and industry
