= 4-Aminosalicylic acid =

Anti-tuberculosis and anti-inflammatory drug

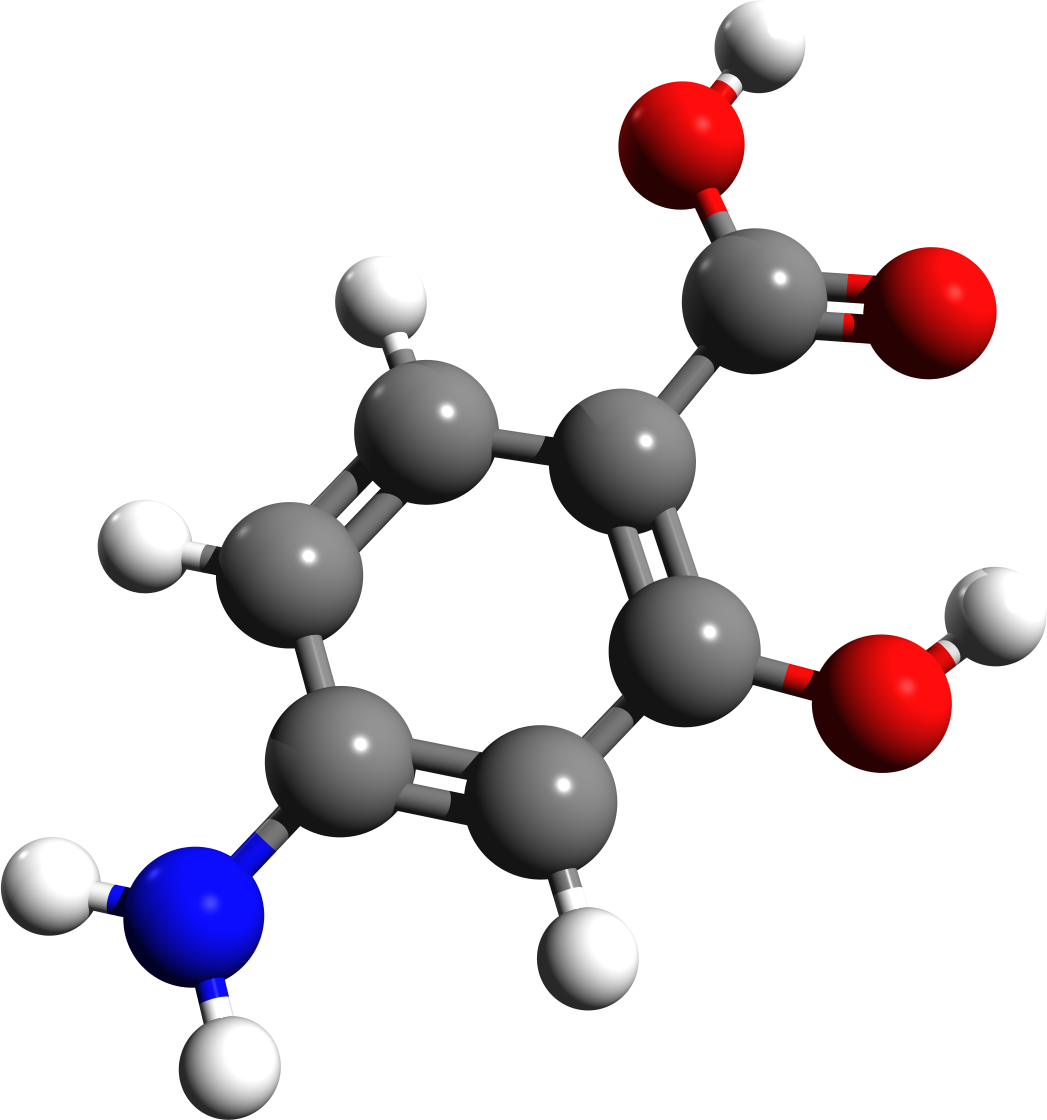

Clinical data
- Trade names: Paser, Granupas, others
- AHFS/Drugs.com: Monograph
- License data: US DailyMed: Aminosalicylic acid
- Routes of administration: By mouth
- ATC code: J04AA01 (WHO)

Legal status
- Legal status: US: ℞-only; EU: Rx-only; In general: ℞ (Prescription only)

Pharmacokinetic data
- Protein binding: 50–60%
- Metabolism: liver
- Excretion: kidney

Identifiers
- IUPAC name: 4-Amino-2-hydroxybenzoic acid
- CAS Number: 65-49-6
- PubChem CID: 4649
- DrugBank: DB00233
- ChemSpider: 4488
- UNII: 5B2658E0N2
- KEGG: D00162
- ChEBI: CHEBI:27565
- ChEMBL: ChEMBL1169
- NIAID ChemDB: 020064
- PDB ligand: BHA (PDBe, RCSB PDB)
- CompTox Dashboard (EPA): DTXSID2022591
- ECHA InfoCard: 100.000.557

Chemical and physical data
- Formula: C_{7}H_{7}NO_{3}
- Molar mass: 153.137 g·mol^{−1}
- 3D model (JSmol): Interactive image
- Melting point: 150.5 °C (302.9 °F)
- SMILES: OC(=O)c1ccc(N)cc1O
- InChI: InChI=1S/C7H7NO3/c8-4-1-2-5(7(10)11)6(9)3-4/h1-3,9H,8H2,(H,10,11); Key:WUBBRNOQWQTFEX-UHFFFAOYSA-N

4-Aminosalicylic acid, also known as para-aminosalicylic acid (PAS) and sold under the brand name Paser among others, is an antibiotic primarily used to treat tuberculosis. Specifically it is used to treat active drug resistant tuberculosis together with other antituberculosis medications. It has also been used as a second line agent to sulfasalazine in people with inflammatory bowel disease such as ulcerative colitis and Crohn's disease. It is typically taken by mouth.

Common side effects include nausea, abdominal pain, and diarrhea. Other side effects may include liver inflammation and allergic reactions. It is not recommended in people with end stage kidney disease. While there does not appear to be harm with use during pregnancy it has not been well studied in this population. 4-Aminosalicylic acid is believed to work by blocking the ability of bacteria to make folic acid.

4-Aminosalicylic acid was first made in 1902, and came into medical use in 1943. It is on the World Health Organization's List of Essential Medicines.

== Medical uses ==
The main use for 4-aminosalicylic acid is for the treatment of tuberculosis infections.

In the United States, 4-aminosalicylic acid is indicated for the treatment of tuberculosis in combination with other active agents.

In the European Union, it is used in combination with other medicines to treat adults and children from 28 days of age who have multi-drug resistant tuberculosis when combinations without this medicine cannot be used, either because the disease is resistant to them or because of their side effects.

=== Tuberculosis ===
Aminosalicylic acid was introduced to clinical use in 1944. It was the second antibiotic found to be effective in the treatment of tuberculosis, after streptomycin. PAS formed part of the standard treatment for tuberculosis prior to the introduction of rifampicin and pyrazinamide.

Its potency is less than that of the current five first-line drugs (isoniazid, rifampicin, ethambutol, pyrazinamide, and streptomycin) for treating tuberculosis and its cost is higher, but it is still useful in the treatment of multidrug-resistant tuberculosis. PAS is always used in combination with other anti-TB drugs.

=== Inflammatory bowel disease ===
4-Aminosalicylic acid has also been used in the treatment of inflammatory bowel disease (ulcerative colitis and Crohn's disease), but has been superseded by other drugs such as sulfasalazine and mesalazine.

=== Others ===
4-Aminosalicylic acid has been investigated for the use in manganese chelation therapy, and a 17-year follow-up study shows that it might be superior to other chelation protocols such as EDTA.

== Side effects ==
Gastrointestinal side-effects (nausea, vomiting, diarrhoea) are common; the delayed-release formulation is meant to help overcome this problem. It is also a cause of drug-induced hepatitis. Patients with glucose-6-phosphate dehydrogenase deficiency should avoid taking aminosalicylic acid as it causes haemolysis. Thyroid goitre is also a side-effect because aminosalicylic acid inhibits the synthesis of thyroid hormones.

Drug interactions include elevated phenytoin levels. When taken with rifampicin, the levels of rifampicin in the blood fall by about half.

It is not known whether it will harm an unborn baby.

== Pharmacology ==
With heat, 4-aminosalicylic acid is decarboxylated to produce CO_{2} and 3-aminophenol.

=== Mechanism of action ===
Some studies have shown that principal antitubercular action of PAS occurs via poisoning of folate metabolism.

Specifically, 4-aminosalicylic acid is incorporated into the folate pathway in place of the correct 4-aminobenzoic acid (PABA) by dihydropteroate synthase (DHPS) to generate hydroxyl-dihydropteroate (HO-H_{2}Pte; 2'-hydroxy-7,8-dihydropteroate). This product is then used by dihydrofolate synthase (DHFS) to make a hydroxyl-dihydrofolate (HO-H_{2}PteGlu) antimetabolite. HO-H_{2}PteGlu competes with dihydrofolate for the binding site of dihydrofolate reductase (DHFR) and blocks the enzymatic activity.

=== Resistance ===
It was initially thought that resistance of 4-aminosalicylic acid came from a mutation affecting dihydrofolate reductase (DHFR). However, it was discovered that it was caused by a mutation affecting the dihydrofolate synthesis (DHFS) enzyme activity. The mutations of isoleucine 43, arginine 49, serine 150, phenylalanine 152, glutamate 153, and alanine 183 were found to affect the binding pocket of the dihydrofolate synthase enzyme. This will reduce the ability for HO-H_{2}Pte to bind to DHFS so that less of OH-H_{2}PteGlu is made.

== History ==
4-Aminosalicylic acid was first synthesized by Seidel and Bittner in 1902. It was rediscovered by the Swedish chemist Jörgen Lehmann upon the report that the tuberculosis bacterium avidly metabolized salicylic acid. Lehmann first tried PAS as an oral TB therapy late in 1944. The first patient made a dramatic recovery. The manner in which Lehmann discovered the TB indication for PAS was salient in the history of drug discovery because it was a rare example in which a person mentally postulated the exact molecule for a drug based on their acquired knowledge of the biochemical behaviour of an analogue of the molecule. The drug proved better than streptomycin, which had nerve toxicity and to which TB could easily develop resistance. In 1948, researchers at Britain's Medical Research Council demonstrated that combined treatment with streptomycin and PAS was superior to either drug alone, and established the principle of combination therapy for tuberculosis.

== Other names ==
4-Aminosalicylic acid has many names including para-aminosalicylic acid, p-aminosalicylic acid, 4-ASA, and simply P.
