= Sulfaclozine =

Anticoccidial and antibacterial agent

Clinical data
- Trade names: Esb3
- Routes of administration: By mouth

Legal status
- Legal status: US: ℞-only (by veterinarian)

Identifiers
- IUPAC name: 4-amino-N-(6-chloropyrazin-2-yl)benzenesulfonamide
- CAS Number: 102-65-8
- PubChem CID: 66890
- ChemSpider: 60252
- UNII: 69YP7Z48CW
- KEGG: D08537
- ChEMBL: ChEMBL2105493
- CompTox Dashboard (EPA): DTXSID60144515
- ECHA InfoCard: 100.002.768

Chemical and physical data
- Formula: C_{10}H_{9}ClN_{4}O_{2}S
- Molar mass: 284.72 g·mol^{−1}
- 3D model (JSmol): Interactive image
- SMILES: Nc1ccc(S(=O)(=O)Nc2cncc(Cl)n2)cc1
- InChI: InChI=1S/C10H9ClN4O2S/c11-9-5-13-6-10(14-9)15-18(16,17)8-3-1-7(12)2-4-8/h1-6H,12H2,(H,14,15); Key:QKLPUVXBJHRFQZ-UHFFFAOYSA-N

Sulfaclozine (or sulfachloropyrazine) is a sulfonamide antimicrobial medication used in veterinary medicine. It is used to treat coccidiosis and bacterial infections like fowl cholera, infectious coryza and diarrhea in birds. Like all sulfonamides, sulfaclozine inhibits bacterial synthesis of folic acid by acting as a competitive inhibitor against PABA.

== Mechanism ==
Like other sulfonamides, sulfaclozine is a dihydropteroate synthase inhibitor. Bacteria and some protozoa are unable to obtain folic acid from the environment, and must instead synthesize it by converting PABA (para-aminobenzoate) to dihydropteroate using the enzyme dihydropteroate synthase. Sulfonamides act as a competitive inhibitor; being structurally similar to PABA, they are able to bind to the enzyme's active site and prevent the synthesis of folic acid from progressing. Folic acid is necessary for these organisms to produce nucleic acids (i.e. DNA and RNA), which are required for cell division. Thus, it has a microbiostatic effect rather than a microbiocidal one (it prevents pathogen growth rather than killing them), and has the strongest effect in the beginning stages of an infection, when the pathogen is rapidly dividing. Since it is microbiostatic, sulfaclozine still requires the animal to still be able to mount an immune response to kill the pathogen.
