= Antimicrobials in aquaculture =

Antimicrobials destroy bacteria, viruses, fungi, algae, and other microbes. The cells of bacteria (prokaryotes), such as salmonella, differ from those of higher-level organisms (eukaryotes), such as fish. Antibiotics are chemicals designed to either kill or inhibit the growth of pathogenic bacteria while exploiting the differences between prokaryotes and eukaryotes in order to make them relatively harmless in higher-level organisms. Antibiotics are constructed to act in one of three ways: by disrupting cell membranes of bacteria (rendering them unable to regulate themselves), by impeding DNA or protein synthesis, or by hampering the activity of certain enzymes unique to bacteria.

Antibiotics are used in aquaculture to treat diseases caused by bacteria. Sometimes the antibiotics are used to treat diseases, but more commonly antibiotics are used to prevent diseases by treating the water or fish before disease occurs. While this prophylactic method of preventing disease is profitable because it prevents loss and allows fish to grow more quickly, there are several downsides.

The overuse of antibiotics can create antibiotic-resistant bacteria. Antibiotic-resistant bacteria can spontaneously arise when selective pressure to survive results in changes to the DNA sequence of a bacterium allowing that bacterium to survive antibiotic treatments. Because some of the same antibiotics are used to treat fish that are used to treat human disease, pathogenic bacteria causing human disease can also become resistant to antibiotics as a result of treatment of fish with antibiotics. For this reason, the overuse of antibiotics in treatment of fish aquaculture (among other agricultural uses) could create public health issues.

== Overview ==
The issue has two sides. In some countries, clean water supplies for aquaculture are extremely limited. Untreated animal manure and human waste are used as feed in shrimp farms and tilapia farms in China and Thailand, in addition to the collection of waste products accumulating from inadequate sewage treatment. In order to prevent the spread of bacteria and disease in contaminated water, some foreign fish farms put U.S.-banned antibiotics into their fishmeal. However, because the more stringent growing regulations in the US increase the price of food, imports from nations without these regulations are increasing based on price and profit.

Between 1995 and 2005, the first ten years of the NAFTA-WTO era in the US, seafood imports increased 65 percent and shrimp imports increased 95 percent. Today, 80 percent of American seafood is imported, about half coming from aquaculture. China, Thailand and Vietnam together account for 44 percent of seafood imports into the United States.

The FDA has been testing for chemicals in aquaculture products for over two decades. In November 2005, the testing program for aquaculture drugs was revised to include antibiotics such as chloramphenicol, fluoroquinolones, nitrofurans, and quinolones, as well as antimicrobial compounds like malachite green that are not approved for use in aquaculture fish. From October 1, 2006, through May 31, 2007, FDA tested samples of catfish, basa, shrimp, dace, and eel from China, finding twenty-five percent of the samples to contain drug residues. FDA has approved five different drugs for use in aquaculture as long as the seafood contains less than a mandated maximum residue limit: florfenicol, sulfamerazine, chorionic gonadotropin, oxytetracycline dihydrate, oxytetracycline hydrochloride, as well as a drug combination of sulfadimethoxine and ormetoprim. FDA has approved two drugs—formalin and hydrogen peroxide—for which it has not set a tolerance.

The FDA now enforces regulations in the US requiring testing of certain imported products for antimicrobial agents under Import Alert 16–131. The Import Alert provides that the use of antimicrobials during the various stages of aquaculture, including malachite green, nitrofurans, fluoroquinolones, and gentian violet, may contribute to an increase of antimicrobial resistance in human pathogens and that prolonged exposure to nitrofurans, malachite green, and gentian violet has been shown to have a carcinogenic affect. In a consumer brochure, the FDA describes the reasoning for enforcement under the import alert:

After FDA repeatedly found that farm-raised seafood from China was contaminated, the agency announced on June 28, 2007, a broader import control of all farm-raised catfish, basa, shrimp, dace(related to carp), and eel from China. During targeted sampling, from October 2006 through May 2007, FDA repeatedly found that farm-raised seafood from China was contaminated with antimicrobial agents that are not approved for use in the United States. More specifically, the antimicrobials nitrofuran, malachite green, gentian violet, and fluoroquinolones, were detected.

Due to limitations on funding and resources, U.S. Government Accountability Office states that only 1% of seafood, compared with 2% of all imports, is inspected and only 0.1% of all seafood is tested for antibiotic residue.

== Example antimicrobials ==
=== Copper alloys ===
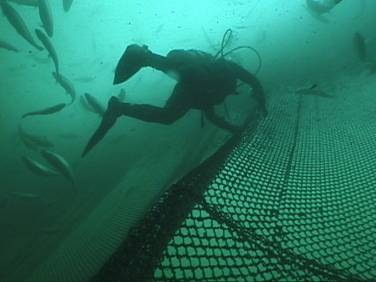
A copper alloy pen that has been deployed on a fish farm at depth of 14 feet for one year shows no signs of biofouling.

Recently, copper alloys have become important netting materials in aquaculture (the farming of aquatic organisms including fish farming). Various other materials including nylon, polyester, polypropylene, polyethylene, plastic-coated welded wire, rubber, patented twine products (Spectra, Dyneema), and galvanized steel are also used for netting in aquaculture fish enclosures around the world. All of these materials are selected for a variety of reasons, including design feasibility, material strength, cost, and corrosion resistance.

What sets copper alloys apart from the other materials used in fish farming is that copper alloys are antimicrobial (For information about the antimicrobial properties of copper and its alloys, see Antimicrobial properties of copper and Antimicrobial copper alloy touch surfaces). In the marine environment, the antimicrobial/algaecidal properties of copper alloys prevent biofouling, which can briefly be described as the undesirable accumulation, adhesion, and growth of microorganisms, plants, algae, tube worms, barnacles, mollusks, and other organisms on man-made marine structures. By inhibiting microbial growth, copper alloy aquaculture pens avoid the need for costly net changes that are necessary with other materials. The resistance of organism growth on copper alloy nets also provides a cleaner and healthier environment for farmed fish to grow and thrive. In addition to their antifouling benefits, copper alloys have strong structural and corrosion-resistant properties in marine environments. Brass alloy netting cages are also currently being deployed in commercial-scale aquaculture operations in Asia, South America, and the USA. See antimicrobial properties of brass

=== Methylene blue ===
Methylene blue is used in aquaculture and by tropical fish hobbyists as a treatment for fungal infections. It can also be effective in treating fish infected with ich, the parasitic protozoa Ichthyophthirius multifiliis. It is usually used to protect newly laid fish eggs from being infected by fungus or bacteria. This is useful when the hobbyist wants to artificially hatch the fish eggs. Methylene Blue is also very effective when used as part of a "medicated fish bath" for treatment of ammonia, nitrite, and cyanide poisoning as well as for topical and internal treatment of injured or sick fish as a "first response".

=== Ozone ===
Ozone is added to seawater and used for the surface disinfection of haddock and Atlantic halibut eggs against nodavirus. Nodavirus is a lethal and vertically transmitted virus which causes severe mortality in fish. Haddock eggs should not be treated with high ozone level as eggs so treated did not hatch and died after 3–4 days.

== Some problematic antimicrobials ==
=== Malachite green ===
In 1983, the FDA banned the use of malachite green in aquaculture. Toxicity studies have shown that this chemical can have serious toxic side effects. Malachite green is not actually an antibiotic, but has antibiotic properties. Malachite green is somewhat stable within the environment and, therefore, is detectable in fish that were treated with the chemical at some point even after treatment has discontinued. After more stringent testing and inspection by the governments of Western Countries, the use of malachite green began to wane and other drugs began to become more prevalent.

=== Chloramphenicol ===
While the U.S. has tested farm-raised shrimp for chloramphenicol since 1994, over the last decade the FDA developed a more sensitive testing methodology and changed the levels of detection for chloramphenicol in response to increasing discovery of traces of chloramphenicol in imports. In response to the US discovery of chloramphenicol in imported shrimp and subsequent increased testing sensitivity, the use of this compound in aquaculture began to decrease.

=== Gentian violet ===
Gentian violet, also known as crystal violet has antibacterial, antifungal, and antiparasitic properties. This compound was used during the World War I era as a topical antiseptic, but has been replaced in modern times with more modern treatments. The FDA prohibits the use of gentian violet in aquaculture because of numerous studies showing increased risk of certain cancers related to the compound and a showing that the chemical is bioavailable in fish when used in aquaculture.

=== Nitrofurans ===
Nitrofurans are broad spectrum antibiotics, being effective against Gram-positive and Gram-negative bacteria. In 1991, the FDA withdrew several approved food animal nitrofuran products as a result of research showing nitrofurazone, one of the nitrofurans, can produce mammary tumors in rats and ovarian tumors in mice. The FDA also concluded that some people may be hypersensitive to this product. The FDA states, "Absolutely, no extra-label use of the nitrofurans is permitted in any food animals, including seafood." The FDA currently detains certain seafood imports without physical examination due to nitrofuran use by the producer.

=== Fluoroquinolones ===
Fluoroquinolones have been prohibited from extra-label use in the U.S. and many other parts of the world in aquaculture because of public health concern about the development of such antimicrobial resistance. Chinese authorities have acknowledged permitting the use of fluoroquinolones in aquaculture, even though the use of fluoroquinolones in food animals may increase antibiotic resistance in human pathogens compromising the effectiveness of the use of this critically important class of antibiotics in human medicine. The Chinese government has established a higher maximum residue limit than the US and research in China has shown that the Chinese are effectively meeting the Chinese limits. Because of concerns about the presence of fluoroquinolones in the food supply, not only in aquaculture, but also in foods like honey, the U.S. is continuing to develop methods and strategies to detect illegal residues and prevent their introduction into the U.S. food supply.

== One Health perspectives on antimicrobial resistance in aquaculture ==
Antimicrobial resistance (AMR) is a global public health concern describing the ability of microorganisms to survive exposure to antimicrobial agents. Within the One Health framework, AMR is recognized as an interconnected problem affecting human, animal, and environmental health.

Aquaculture—the farming of fish, shellfish, and other aquatic organisms—has become a focal point in AMR discussions due to its rapid global expansion and historical reliance on antimicrobials for disease prevention and growth promotion. Unlike terrestrial livestock systems, aquaculture often occurs in open or semi-open aquatic environments, facilitating the dissemination of antimicrobial residues, resistant bacteria, and resistance genes into surrounding ecosystems.

=== Drivers of antimicrobial resistance ===
Key drivers of AMR in aquaculture include intensive production practices, high stocking densities, prophylactic antimicrobial use, and regulatory gaps in antimicrobial governance. These factors are particularly pronounced in low- and middle-income countries, where access to veterinary oversight and antimicrobial stewardship is often limited.

=== Epidemiology and environmental persistence ===
Antimicrobial-resistant bacteria have been detected in farmed fish, aquaculture sediments, and surrounding waters worldwide. Frequently identified organisms include Vibrio spp., Aeromonas spp., and Escherichia coli, with documented resistance to critically important antimicrobials such as fluoroquinolones, tetracyclines, and beta-lactams.

Aquatic environments promote horizontal gene transfer among microbial populations through plasmids, integrons, and transposons, enabling resistance genes to persist long after antimicrobial use has ceased. Sediments beneath aquaculture facilities can function as long-term reservoirs of resistance genes, distinguishing aquaculture from many terrestrial production systems.

=== Human and environmental health implications ===
From a One Health perspective, AMR associated with aquaculture poses risks through multiple exposure pathways. Humans may be exposed through consumption of contaminated seafood, occupational contact among aquaculture workers, or environmental dissemination into drinking and recreational waters.

Environmental release of antimicrobial residues and resistant bacteria may alter microbial community structures, facilitate transmission to wild fish populations, and reinforce feedback loops that increase disease pressure and antimicrobial use.

=== Prevention and mitigation strategies ===
Efforts to address AMR in aquaculture increasingly emphasize preventive approaches. Vaccination programs have substantially reduced antimicrobial use in countries with intensive fish farming, such as Norway. Additional strategies include improved biosecurity, water quality management, probiotics, and alternative production systems such as recirculating aquaculture systems and integrated multi-trophic aquaculture.

=== Governance and policy considerations ===
International organizations including WHO, FAO, WOAH, and UNEP have emphasized the inclusion of aquaculture within national and global AMR action plans. Integrated surveillance systems that encompass human, animal, and environmental sectors are considered essential for addressing antimicrobial resistance in aquatic production systems.
