= C12H14N4O4S =

The molecular formula C_{12}H_{14}N_{4}O_{4}S (molar mass: 310.33 g/mol, exact mass: 310.0736 u) may refer to:

- Sulfadimethoxine
- Sulfadoxine
