= Sulfadimethoxine =

Chemical compound

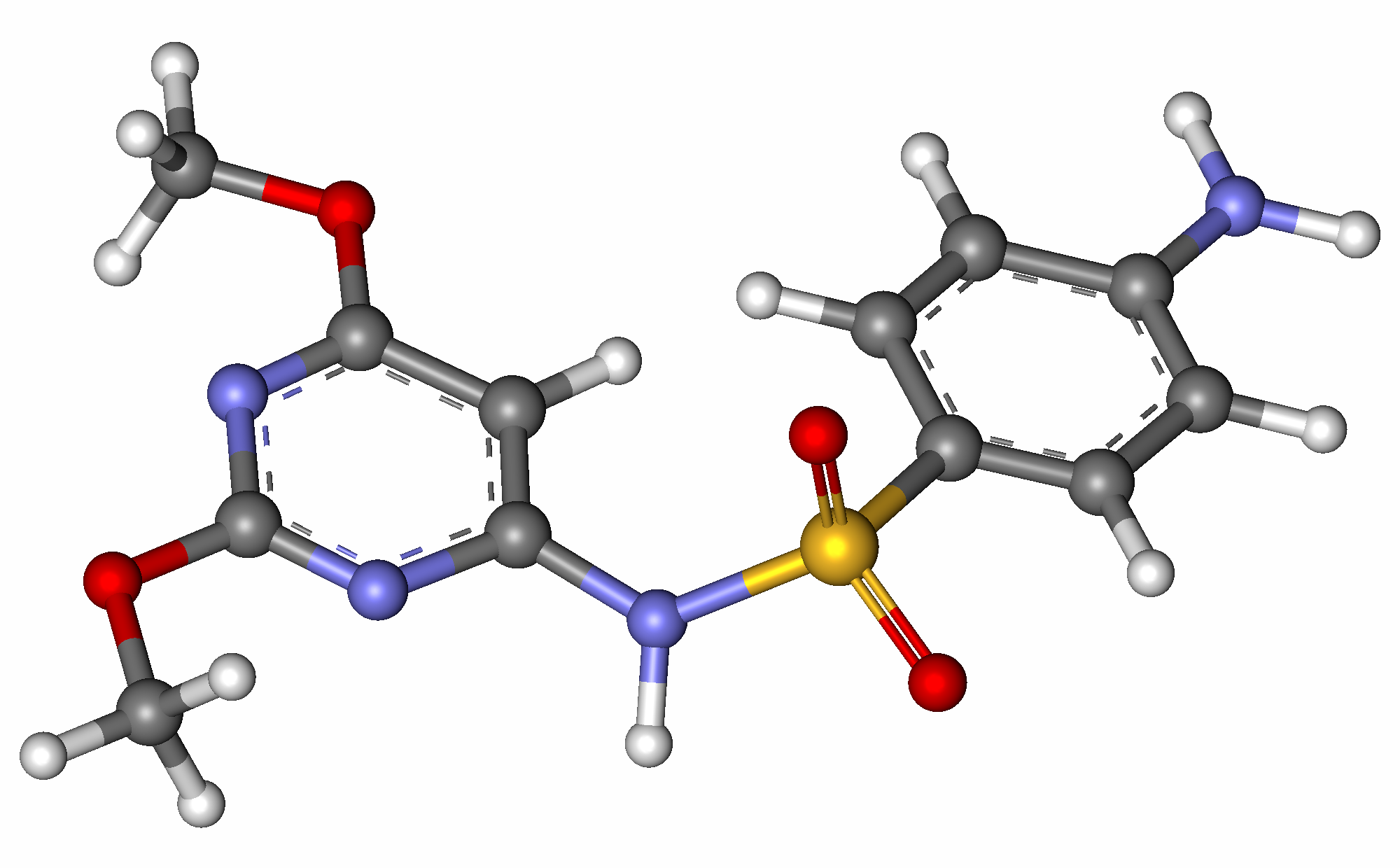

Clinical data
- Trade names: Albon, Di-Methox
- AHFS/Drugs.com: FDA Professional Drug Information
- Routes of administration: By mouth; can be IV in cattle
- ATC code: J01ED02 (WHO) QJ01EQ09 (WHO), QP51BA01 (WHO)

Legal status
- Legal status: AU: S4 (Prescription only); US: ℞-only (by veterinarian)

Pharmacokinetic data
- Bioavailability: 55–60%
- Elimination half-life: 13.1 hours in dogs

Identifiers
- IUPAC name: 4-Amino-N-(2,6-dimethoxypyrimidin-4-yl)benzenesulfonamide
- CAS Number: 122-11-2
- PubChem CID: 5323
- DrugBank: DB06150
- ChemSpider: 5132
- UNII: 30CPC5LDEX
- KEGG: D01142
- ChEBI: CHEBI:32161
- ChEMBL: ChEMBL62193
- CompTox Dashboard (EPA): DTXSID1023607
- ECHA InfoCard: 100.004.113

Chemical and physical data
- Formula: C_{12}H_{14}N_{4}O_{4}S
- Molar mass: 310.33 g·mol^{−1}
- 3D model (JSmol): Interactive image
- SMILES: COc1cc(nc(n1)OC)NS(=O)(=O)c2ccc(cc2)N
- InChI: InChI=1S/C12H14N4O4S/c1-19-11-7-10(14-12(15-11)20-2)16-21(17,18)9-5-3-8(13)4-6-9/h3-7H,13H2,1-2H3,(H,14,15,16); Key:ZZORFUFYDOWNEF-UHFFFAOYSA-N

Sulfadimethoxine (or sulphadimethoxine, trade names Di-Methox or Albon) is a long-lasting sulfonamide antimicrobial medication used in veterinary medicine. It is used to treat many infections, including respiratory, urinary tract, enteric, and soft tissue infections and can be given as a standalone or combined with ormetoprim to broaden the target range. Like all sulfamides, sulfadimethoxine inhibits bacterial synthesis of folic acid by acting as a competitive inhibitor against PABA. It is the most common drug prescribed to dogs who have coccidiosis.

== Mechanism ==
Like other sulfonamides, sulfadimethoxine is a dihydropteroate synthase inhibitor. Bacteria and some protozoa are unable to obtain folic acid from the environment, and must instead synthesize it by converting PABA (para-aminobenzoate) to dihydropteroate using the enzyme dihydropteroate synthase. Sulfonamides act as a competitive inhibitor; being structurally similar to PABA, they are able to bind to the enzyme's active site and prevent the synthesis of folic acid from progressing. Folic acid is necessary for these organisms to produce nucleic acids (i.e. DNA and RNA), which are required for cell division. Thus, it has a microbiostatic effect rather than a microbiocidal one (it prevents pathogen growth rather than killing them), and has the strongest effect in the beginning stages of an infection, when the pathogen is rapidly dividing. Since it is microbiostatic, sulfadimethoxine still requires the animal to still be able to mount an immune response to kill the pathogen.

=== With ormetoprim ===
Sulfadimethoxine can either be given alone (such as under the commercial name Albon) or in combination with ormetoprim to as a "potentiated sulfonamide" to increase antimicrobial activity. Ormetoprim is a diaminopyridine, inhibiting dihydrofolate reductase, which is further along the pathway for synthesizing folic acid. Though the optimum ratio of sulfadimethoxine to ormetoprim has been found to be 20:1, it is sold pharmaceutically as a 5:1 mixture.

== Pharmacokinetics ==
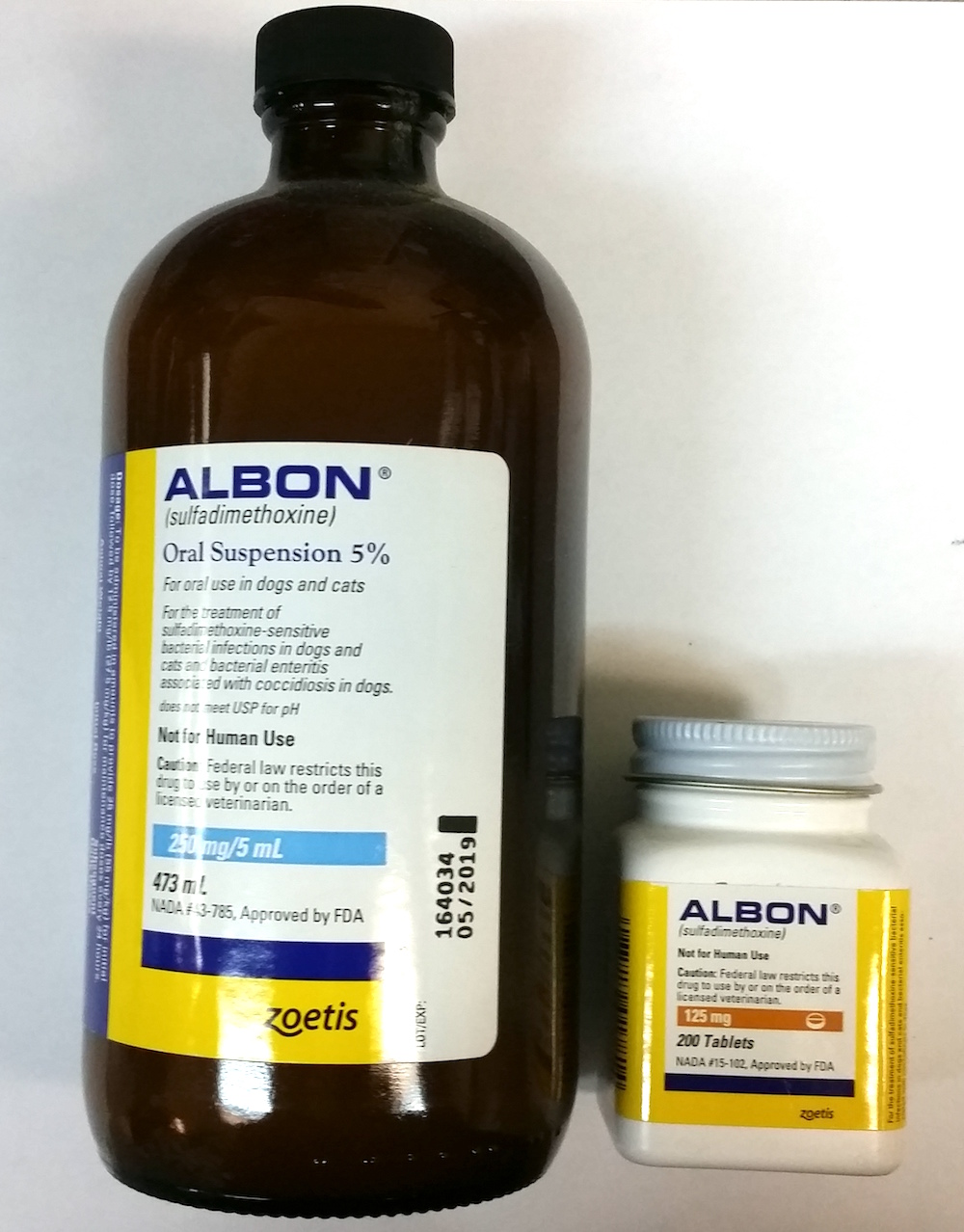
Suspension and bottle of pills of sulfadimethoxine, sold under the trade name Albon.

Sulfadimethoxine, like all sulfonamides, diffuses easily when it is in its unionized, lipid-soluble form, and easily reaches many tissues. The relative amounts are determined by both its pKa and by the pH of each tissue. Therefore, levels tend to be higher in less acidic tissue and body fluids or in diseased tissues having high concentrations of leucocytes. Its ability to bind to plasma proteins is very high, leading sulfadimethoxine to maintain higher blood levels than most other long-acting sulfonamides. Comparatively low doses can give rapid and sustained therapeutic blood levels. Most animals for which sulfadimethoxine is marketed acetylate sulfadimethoxine in the liver to form acetylsulfadimethoxine, which is secreted in the bile. Dogs are the exception; since they are unable to acetylate sulfonamides, they excrete sulfadimethoxine mostly unchanged in the urine. Their inability to transform sulfadimethoxine also makes dogs more susceptible to negative side effects.

Sulfadimethoxine has a relatively high solubility at the pH normally occurring in the kidneys, and is easily reabsorbed into the renal tubules, adding to its long half-life. The use of sulfadimethoxine raises concerns that it will precipitate in the kidneys, leading to crystalluria. Though crystallization is not actually a common occurrence in veterinary medicine, it can be avoided entirely by adding a diaminopyrimidine such as ormetoprim. Having the animal stay well-hydrated also is advised.

== Use & Dosage ==
Sulfadimethoxine is the only FDA-approved drug for treating intestinal coccidioisis in cats and dogs. It is also used for:

- Treating skin and soft-tissue infections in dogs caused by Staphylococcus aureus or E. coli
- Treating cattle for bovine respiratory disease complex ("shipping fever complex"), necrotic pododermatitis (foot rot), pneumonia when caused by Pasteurella, and calf diphtheria caused by Fusobacterium necrophorum
- When combined with ormetoprim:
  - Treating soft tissue infections, skin infections, urinary tract infections, and intestinal coccidia infections in dogs
  - Prevention of fowl cholera and coccidioisis by Eimeria in poultry
  - Treating salmon and trout for furunculosis

It is also one of the only sulfonamides allowed for treating lactating dairy cattle (the others being sulfabromethazine and sulfathoxypyridazine). The proper dosage of sulfadimethoxine depends on the animal species, the medical condition being treated, and the specific formulation of the medication. Using a tool like Sulfadimethoxine dosage calculator is important to determine the right dosage based on the animal's weight and species.
