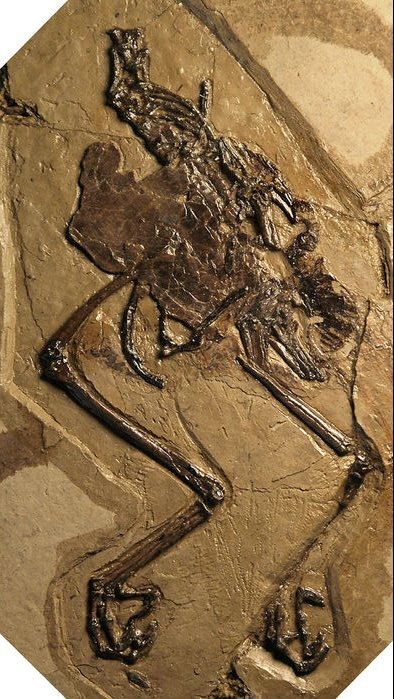
- Fossil of Avimaia schweitzerae with an unlaid egg

Scientific classification
- Kingdom: Animalia
- Phylum: Chordata
- Class: Reptilia
- Clade: Dinosauria
- Clade: Saurischia
- Clade: Theropoda
- Clade: Avialae
- Clade: †Enantiornithes
- Genus: †Avimaia; Bailleul et al. 2019

Type species
- Avimaia schweitzerae Bailleul et al. 2019

= Avimaia =

Avimaia Temporal range: Aptian ~115–110 Ma

Extinct genus of birds

Avimaia is a genus of fossil birds of the Enantiornithes clade that lived about 115 million years ago in Northwest China. The only known species is A. schweitzerae. The holotype fossil of the bird was found in the Xiagou Formation, and is noted as the first discovered fossil bird with an unlaid egg. Abnormalities, including egg binding in which the egg becomes stuck within the body of the bird causing death, were found in the egg suggesting that the preserved egg may have caused this bird's demise. Egg binding is a serious and lethal condition that is fairly common in small birds undergoing stress.

According to paleontologist Jasmina Wiemann of Yale University, “This is a spectacular fossil with a lot of potential for future paleobiological investigations." Further, "This new specimen is arguably one of the most interesting Cretaceous fossil birds yet discovered, providing more reproductive information than any other Mesozoic fossil bird," according to a paleontology researcher at the Chinese Academy of Sciences.

== Discovery and naming ==
In 2006, at Changma in Gansu the skeleton was found of an enantiornithean bird. In several studies it was referred to with its field number DCAGS-IG-06-CM-012 or FDRC-06-CM-012.

In 2019, the type species Avimaia schweitzerae was named and described by Alida M. Bailleul, Jingmai Kathleen O’Connor, Zhang Shukang, Li Zhiheng, Wang Qiang, Matthew C. Lamanna, Zhu Xufeng and Zhou Zhonghe. The generic name is a combination of the Latin avis, "bird", and Maia, a mother goddess, in reference to the find of an egg in the abdomen of the fossil. The specific name honours Mary Higby Schweitzer, one of the founders of the application of molecular biology in paleontology.

The holotype, IVPP V25371, was found in a layer of the lower-middle Xiagou Formation. It consists of a partial skeleton lacking the skull, compressed on a single plate. It conserves the rear half of the body. It is articulated and visible from the underside. Parts of the plumage and an egg are preserved. A second specimen, CAGS-IG-04-CM-007, was referred to the species. It is a partial skeleton lacking the skull. It is not articulated and preserves parts of the pelvis and the hindlimbs.

== Description ==
Avimaia is a relatively small member of the Enantiornithes.

The describing authors found two distinguishing traits. They are autapomorphies, unique derived characters. The pubic bone has a slender build and is curved upwards, causing a hollow profile over the entire length of its rear edge. The rear end of the ischium is curved to above.

In several additional traits Avimaia differs from some relatives. The sacrum consists of eight sacral vertebrae. The first metatarsal is J-shaped with its diverging lower end having two thirds of the length of the shaft, which is a relatively low ratio.

=== Egg ===
Between the pubic bones of the fossil, a flattened egg is present, running from the last back vertebra to the front of the pygostyle, the fused outer tail vertebrae. It covers a surface of 5.2 cm^{2}. It is the first time a fossil bird egg has been discovered within the abdomen of the female. The egg is not merely an outline of organic remains: the egg shells themselves have been preserved, which is again unique. The combined shells have a thickness of 0.2 to 0.4 millimetres.

A section showed the presence of four to six separate shells stacked on top of each other, each about 0.05 millimetres thick. Each shell consists of three layers, as with modern birds and generally in derived dinosaur eggs. There is an inner mammillary layer, an intermediate prismatic layer and an outer crystalline layer. The three layers combined are rather thin: earlier reported shells of Enantiornithes are thicker. Another anomaly consists in the fact that the prismatic layer and outer layer combined are thinner than the mammillary layer, whereas normally the opposite is true. On the surface of the egg a brown organic layer is visible, which was identified as the cuticle. In the cuticle nanospheres of calcium phosphate were discovered, which are also present in the cuticle of some extant birds. Additionally, remains were identified of the egg membrane, the membrana testacea. The fibres of the membrane are individually visible and have a length of 1.5 to 4 micrometres. They possibly contain part of the original proteins. It is likely that during fossilisation, the egg shells shifted in relation to each other and were otherwise distorted.

The presence of four to six shells on top of each other is difficult to explain. The authors considered the possibility that the shells represented two eggs, but this hypothesis was rejected. In case of two eggs, the two top shells should have mirrored each other, as they then should have been the opposite shells of a top egg. In reality, they mirror the lower shells. Furthermore, it is generally assumed that the Eumaniraptora only have one functional oviduct. It was concluded that the stacking was caused by a pathology, egg binding, which is not uncommon among some modern bird species, such as the chicken, and can be caused by stress. Retention of the egg in the oviduct would have led to the deposition of multiple shells on a single egg. Such a condition is potentially fatal and it was suggested that it led to the demise of the holotype individual.

=== Medullary bone ===
In the thighbone, section showed that an inner layer of medullary bone was present around the medullary cavity. Such a medullary bone is used by modern bird females to extract chalk from during the laying of eggs. Its presence thus confirms that the holotype is a female and the structure in its abdomen is indeed an egg.

=== Plumage ===
What little of the plumage has been preserved, seems to indicate that long tail feathers were absent. It has been suggested that in the Enantiornithes such long display feathers were limited to the males only, as an instance of sexual dimorphism. Their absence thus is a further corroboration of the hypothesis that the type specimen is female.

== Phylogeny ==
Avimaia was placed in the Enantiornithes in 2019. A cladistic analysis indicated a derived position in that clade, in a polytomy with Neuquenornis, Enantiophoenix, Concornis and Eoenantiornis.

== Gallery ==
Fossil – Avimaia schweitzerae

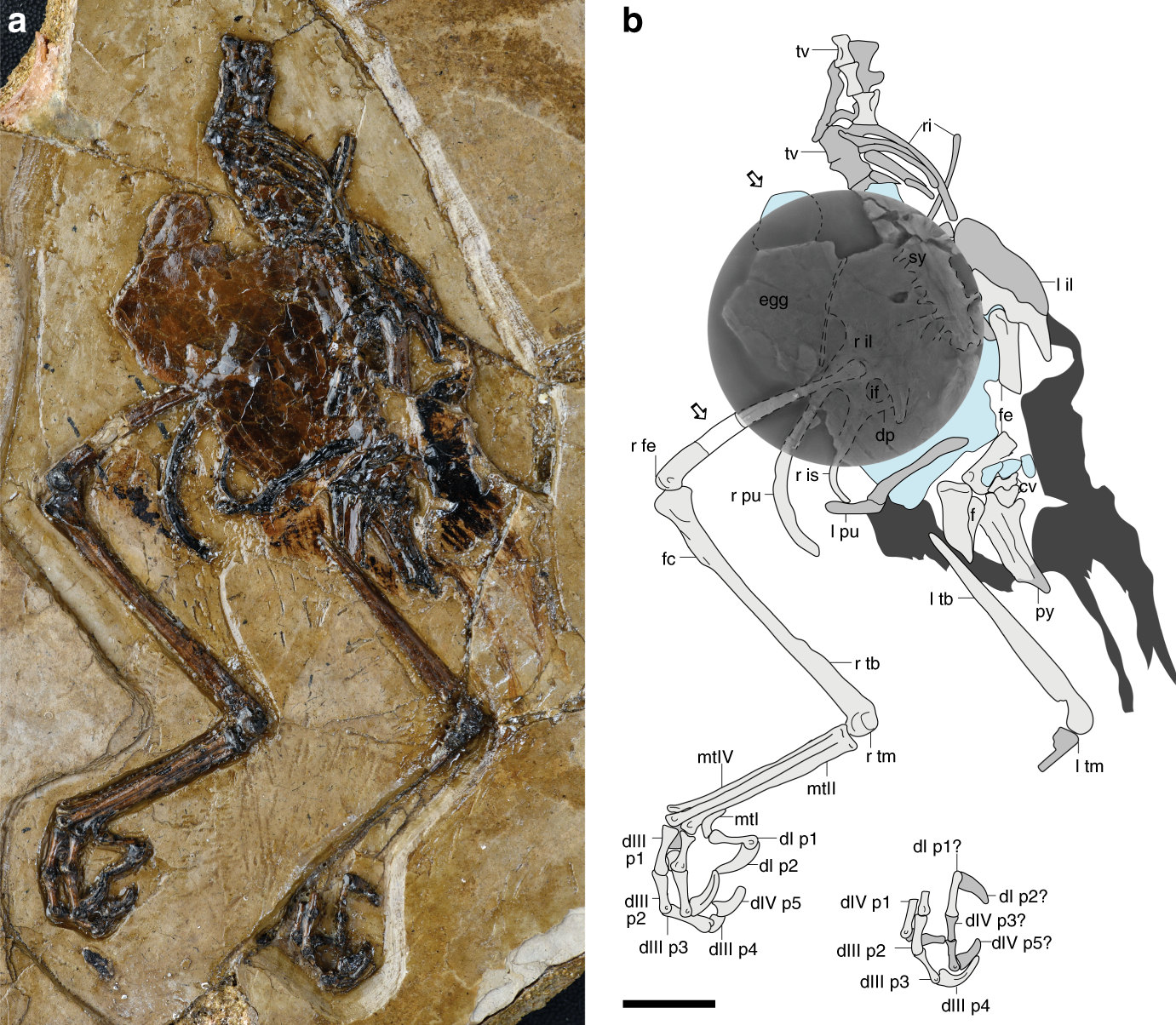
Partial skeleton photo – interpretive line drawing

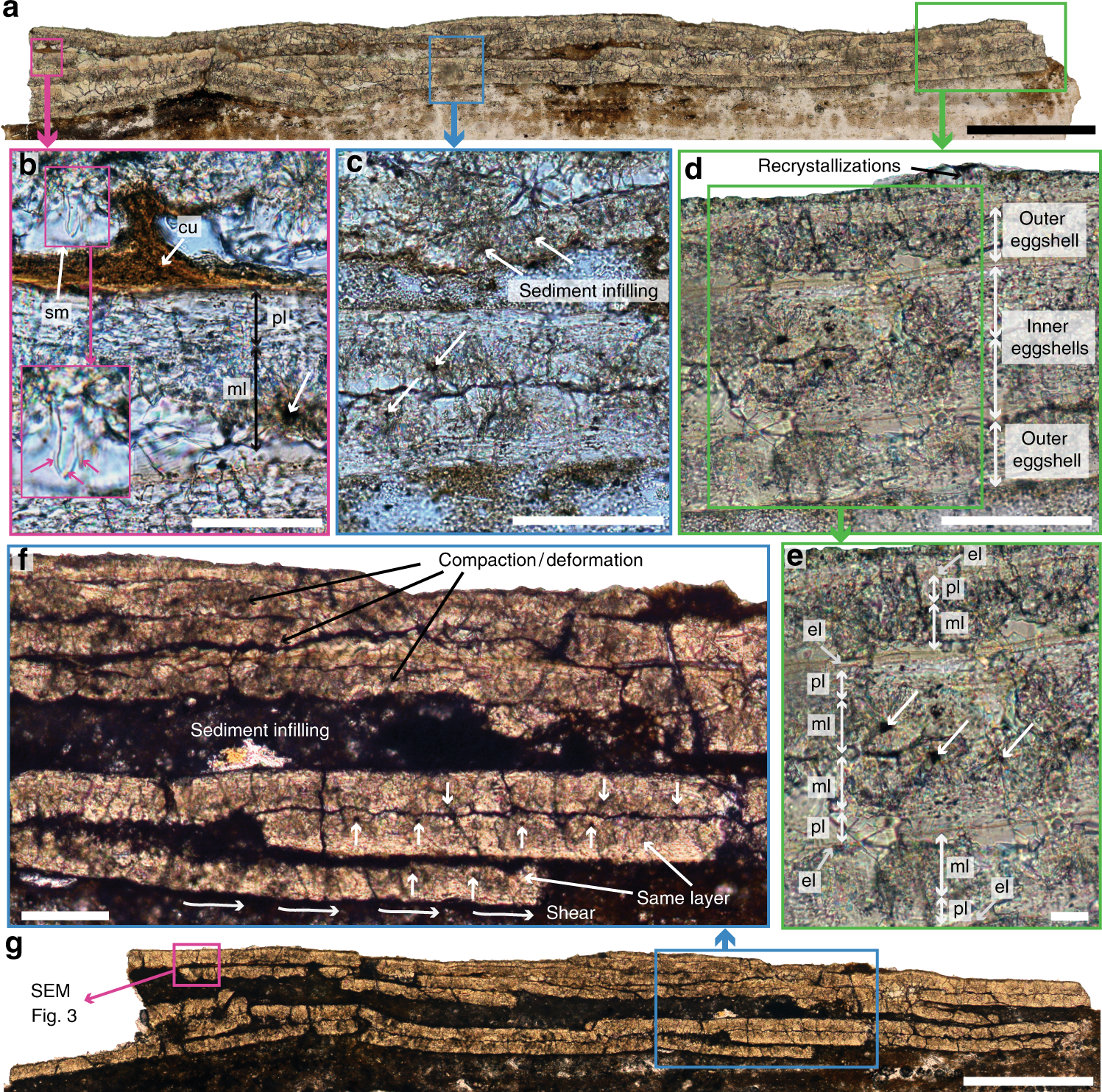
Egg shell

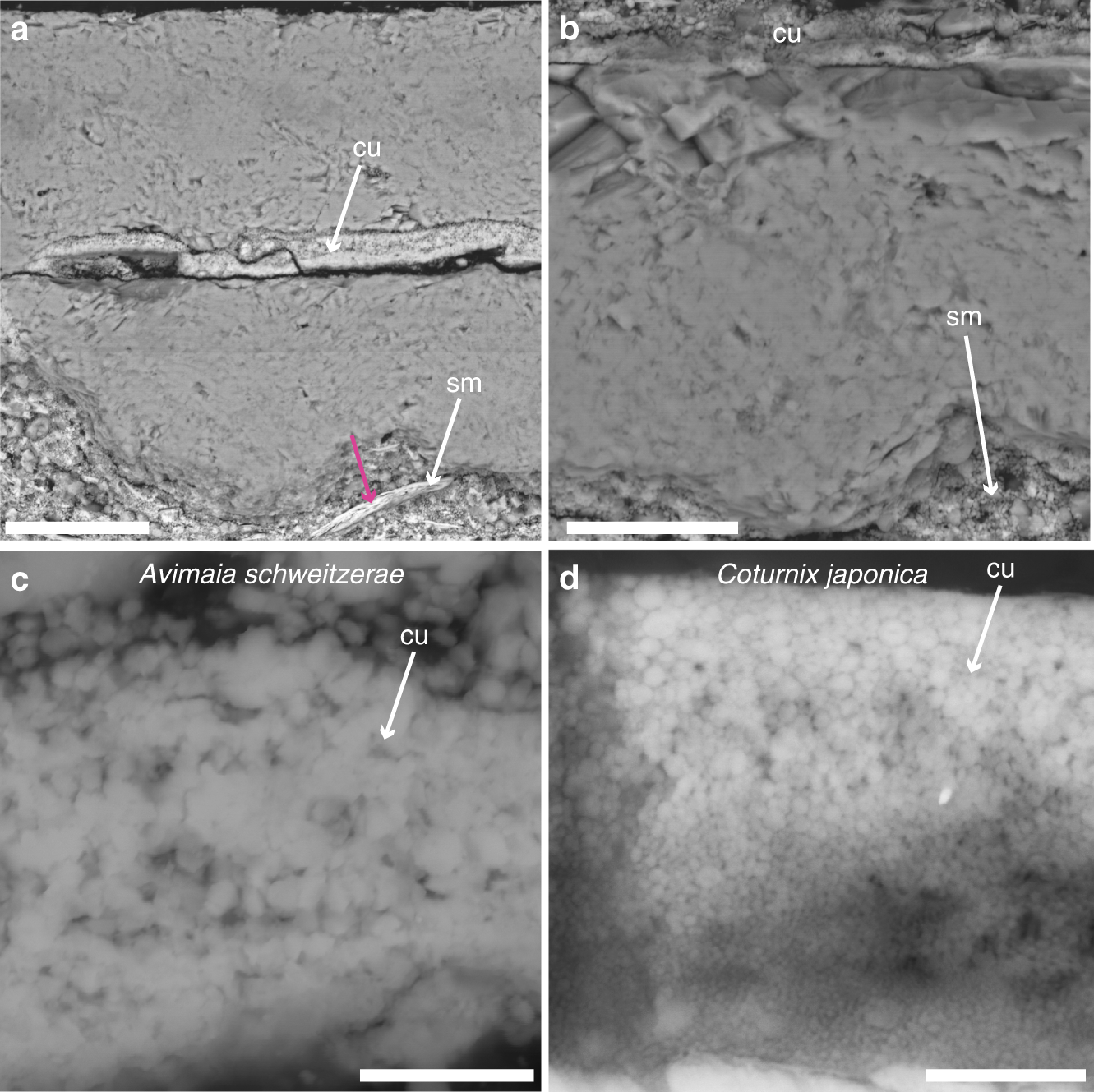
Egg cuticle, shell, membrane

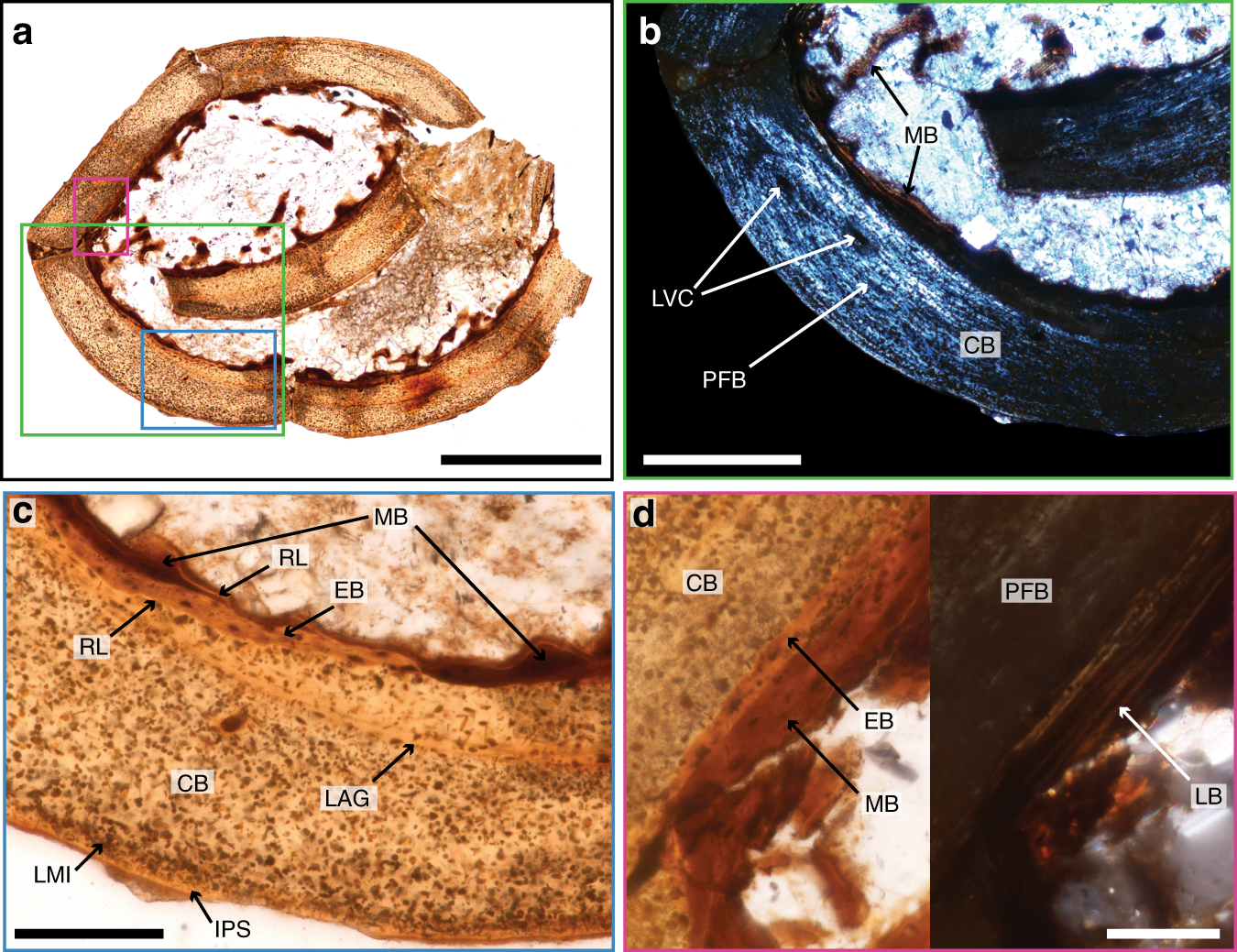
Histology shows medullary bone

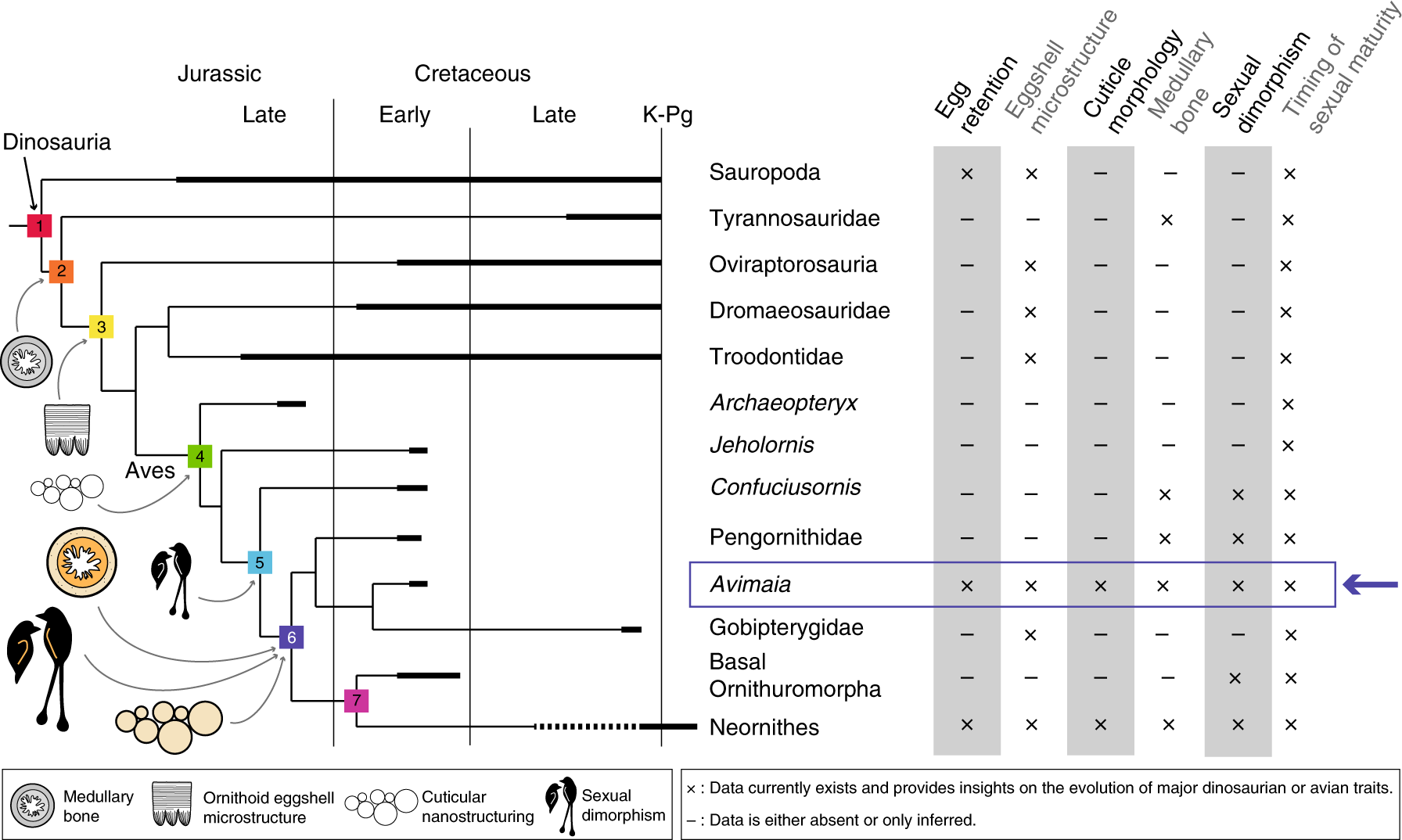
Simplified phylogeny - hypothetical evolutionary stages - modern avian reproduction
