= Chlorproguanil/dapsone/artesunate =

Antimalarial drug

Combination of
- Chlorproguanil: Antimalarial drug
- Dapsone: Antibiotic
- Artesunate: Antimalarial drug

Legal status
- Legal status: Development halted

Identifiers
- ChemSpider: none

Chlorproguanil/dapsone/artesunate (abbreviated CDA) was an experimental antimalarial treatment that entered Phase III clinical trials in 2006. Development was halted because it was associated with an increased risk of haemolytic anaemia in patients with glucose-6-phosphate dehydrogenase deficiency.

It consists of chlorproguanil, dapsone, and artesunate. (It can also be interpreted as Lapdap+artesunate.)

Studies compared this combination against artemether/lumefantrine (Coartem) and against chlorproguanil/dapsone (Lapdap). This drug was developed in collaboration between GlaxoSmithKline, UNICEF, the World Bank, Medicines for Malaria Venture and the WHO Special Programme for Research and Training in Tropical Diseases (WHO/TDR), the Liverpool School of Tropical Medicine, and the London School of Hygiene and Tropical Medicine.
