= Mary Higby Schweitzer =

American paleontologist

- Education: Utah State University (BS); Montana State University (PhD)
- Scientific career
- Fields: Paleontology

Mary Higby Schweitzer is an American paleontologist at North Carolina State University, who led the groups that discovered the remains of blood cells in dinosaur fossils and later discovered soft tissue remains in the Tyrannosaurus rex specimen MOR 1125, as well as evidence that the specimen was a pregnant female when she died.

== Biography ==
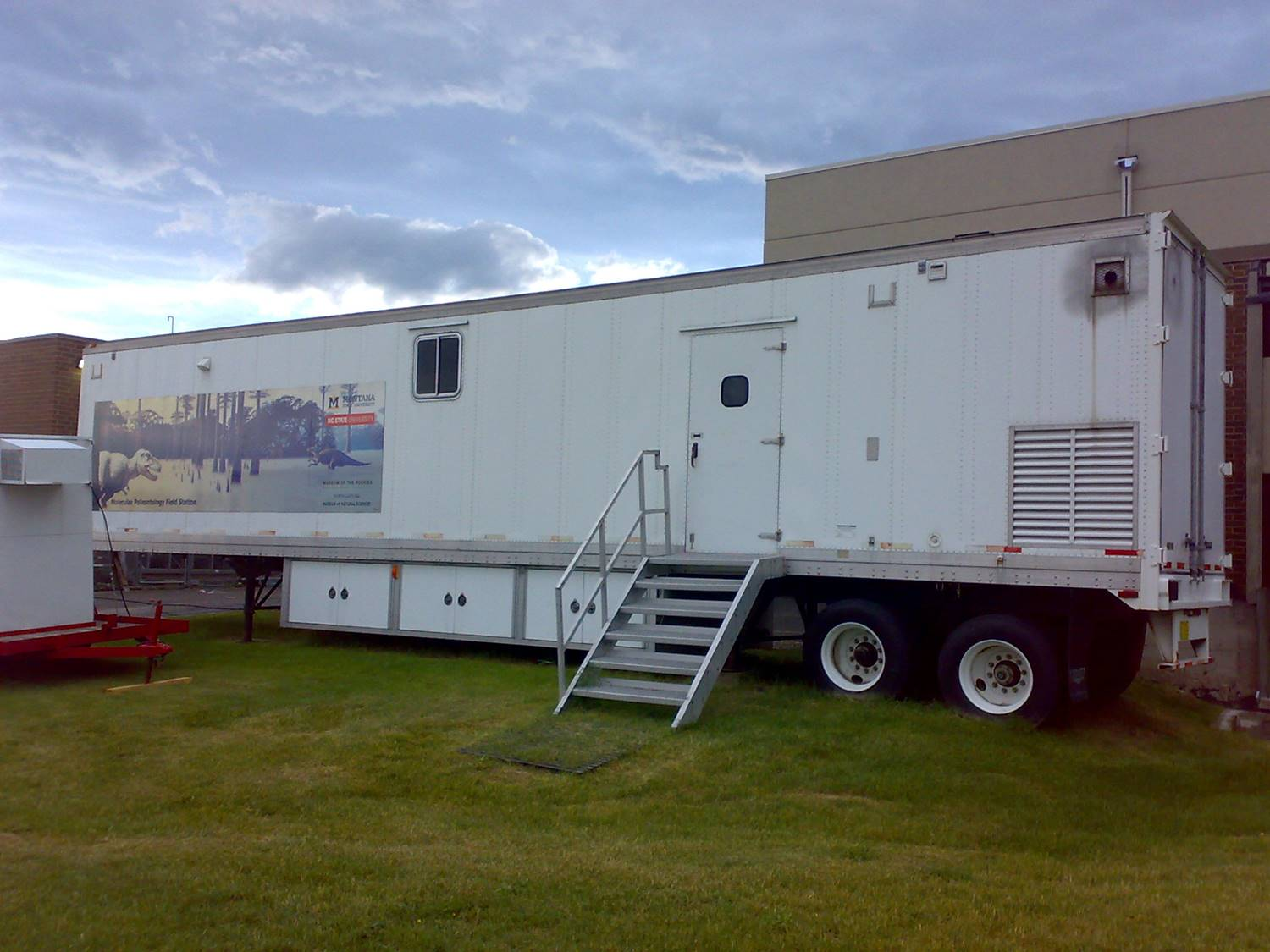
Schweitzer's mobile laboratory, Museum of the Rockies, Bozeman (Montana)

Schweitzer earned a B.S. in Communicative Disorders from Utah State University in 1977, and got a Certificate of Secondary Education in Broadfield Science from Montana State University in 1988. Under the direction of mentor Jack Horner, she received her Ph.D. in Biology from Montana State University in 1995.

She has three children.

Based at North Carolina State University, Schweitzer is currently researching molecular paleontology, molecular diagenesis and taphonomy, evolution of physiological and reproductive strategies in dinosaurs and their bird descendants, and astrobiology.

== Discoveries ==
In 2000, Bob Harmon, chief preparator of paleontology at the Museum of the Rockies, discovered a Tyrannosaurus skeleton in the Hell Creek Formation in Montana. After a two-year retrieval process, Jack Horner, director of the Museum, gave the femur bone to Schweitzer. Schweitzer was able to retrieve proteins from this femur in 2007.

Schweitzer was the first researcher to identify and isolate soft tissues from an ancient fossil bone. The soft tissues are collagen, a connective protein. Amino acid sequencing of several samples have shown matches with the known collagens of chickens, frogs, newts and other animals. Schweitzer has also isolated organic compounds and antigenic structures in sauropod egg shells. With respect to the significance of her work, Kevin Padian, Curator of Paleontology, University of California Museum of Paleontology, has stated "Chemicals that might degrade in a laboratory over a short period need not do so in a protected natural chemical environment...it's time to readjust our thinking."

Schweitzer previously announced similar discoveries in 1993. Since then, the claim of discovering soft tissues in an ancient fossil has been disputed by some molecular biologists. Later research by Kaye et al. published in PLoS ONE (30 July 2008) challenged the claims that the material found is the soft tissue of Tyrannosaurus. A more recent study (October 2010) published in PLoS ONE contradicts the conclusion of Kaye and supports Schweitzer's original conclusion. Evidence for the extraction of short segments of ancient DNA from dinosaur fossils has been reported on two occasions. The extraction of protein, soft tissue, remnant cells and organelle-like structures from dinosaur fossils has been confirmed. Blood-derived porphyrin proteins have also been discovered in a mid-Eocene mosquito fossil.

In the developing field of paleoproteomics, Schweitzer has also discovered that iron particles may play a part in the preservation of soft tissue over geologic time.

== Awards and honors ==
On April 28, 2018, Schweitzer became the first recipient of the Dr. Elizabeth 'Betsy' Nicholls Award for Excellence in Palaeontology at the Canadian Fossil Discovery Centre's Dig Deep Gala event. As the award recipient Schweitzer was the keynote speaker and presented on her research.

On March 20, 2019, the journal Nature Communications published a paper naming an extinct bird "Avimaia schweitzerae... in honor of Mary Higby Schweitzer for her ground-breaking works on MB [ medullary bone ] and for her role in establishing the field of molecular paleontology."
