= DHFS =

DHFS may refer to:

- Dihydrofolate synthase, an enzyme
- Defence Helicopter Flying School
- Dronfield Henry Fanshawe School
