= C10H9ClN4O2S =

The molecular formula C_{10}H_{9}ClN_{4}O_{2}S (molar mass: 284.72 g/mol) may refer to:

- Sulfachlorpyridazine
- Sulfaclozine
