= Chlorproguanil/dapsone =

Combination drug

Combination of
- Chlorproguanil: Antimalarial drug
- Dapsone: Antibiotic

Legal status
- Legal status: Withdrawn

Identifiers
- CAS Number: 209665-78-1

Chlorproguanil/dapsone (sold commercially as Lapdap) was a fixed dose antimalarial combination containing chlorproguanil and dapsone, which act synergistically against malaria. The drug was withdrawn in 2008 following increasing evidence of toxicity in the form of haemolysis occurring in patients with G6PD deficiency.
