= Ormetoprim =

Chemical compound

Clinical data
- Other names: Ormethoprim

Identifiers
- IUPAC name: 5-[(4,5-Dimethoxy-2-methylphenyl)methyl]pyrimidine-2,4-diamine
- CAS Number: 6981-18-6
- PubChem CID: 23418
- ChemSpider: 21899
- UNII: M3EFS94984
- KEGG: D05273
- ChEBI: CHEBI:94553
- ChEMBL: ChEMBL494760
- CompTox Dashboard (EPA): DTXSID1046689
- ECHA InfoCard: 100.027.497

Chemical and physical data
- Formula: C_{14}H_{18}N_{4}O_{2}
- Molar mass: 274.324 g·mol^{−1}
- 3D model (JSmol): Interactive image
- SMILES: CC1=CC(=C(C=C1CC2=CN=C(N=C2N)N)OC)OC
- InChI: InChI=1S/C14H18N4O2/c1-8-4-11(19-2)12(20-3)6-9(8)5-10-7-17-14(16)18-13(10)15/h4,6-7H,5H2,1-3H3,(H4,15,16,17,18); Key:KEEYRKYKLYARHO-UHFFFAOYSA-N

Ormetoprim is an antibiotic used in veterinary medicine. Typically it is used in combination with sulfadimethoxine, and it is used in the poultry and aquaculture industries.

Ormetoprim, like other diaminopyrimidines such as trimethoprim, inhibits the reduction of dihydrofolic acid to tetrahydrofolic acid by bacterial cells.
