= Child Development Associate =

U.S. credential in early childhood education

The Child Development Associate (CDA) Credential is the most widely recognized credential in early childhood education (ECE) in the U.S. The credential is awarded by the Council for Professional Recognition. To earn a CDA, applicants must demonstrate their competency in areas which support the healthy growth and development of children, both in center-based care, family or home based care, and in home visiting programs.

== History ==
In 1973, the U.S. Department of Health, Education, and Welfare, Administration on Children, Youth and Families (ACYF) funded the Child Development Associate Credential (CDA) to improve the quality of early childhood education (ECE.) The CDA was based on a combination of verified training hours, objective testing, and direct observation of the candidate in the classroom environment.

The CDA encompasses both working with children in the ECE setting and interaction with parents or guardians. The first CDA credential was awarded in 1975. The CDA became the sole nationally recognized ECE credential, accepted in all 50 states and U.S. Territories. An initial CDA credential was valid for a period of five years, with a renewal valid for a period of three years.

In 1985, ACYF, in cooperation with the National Association for the Education of Young Children (NAEYC), created a separate non-profit organization for the administration of the CDA Credential. The Council for Early Childhood Professional Recognition was founded to administer the CDA program. In 2003, The Council for Early Childhood Professional Recognition changed its name to Council for Professional Recognition.

In May 2012, the Council for Early Childhood Professional Recognition announced that the CDA Credential process would be updated to include a self-paced online application process and proctored examinations at Pearson VUE testing centers. This CDA 2.0 process began on June 1, 2013.

== The Credential ==
The CDA Credential is offered in four settings and is additionally available in bilingual and Spanish categories.

- Preschool – For candidates working with children ages three to five years of age.
- Infant/Toddler – For candidates working with children from birth to three years of age
- Family Childcare – For candidates working with children from birth to five years of age in a home-based childcare center or business
- Home Visitor – For candidates working directly with parents/caregivers in early child care programs that conduct visits to individual homes.
- Military School Age – specific standards for military teachers and Family Child Care providers.

In 2012, the program was expanded to include GED holders and for high school students enrolled in early educational career-technical and family consumer science programs. In 2012, the Council for Professional Recognition awarded its 300,000th credential.

== Credential framework ==
The credentials involve two main areas: the application, and the observation and testing process.

Each credential type focuses on six Competency Standards and thirteen Functional Areas. With the application, candidates submit documentation of 120 hours of formal Early childhood education training in the appropriate age group, 480 hours of professional experience in the appropriate age group, formal observation by a Council for Professional Recognition certified Professional Development Specialist (PDS), CDA examination, and a statement of ethical conduct. Training can be completed through various methods such as sponsored training programs (Head Start), four-year colleges, community colleges, and various resource and referral agencies.

Once the Council for Professional Recognition has reviewed the application, a PDS will conduct a Verification Visit. During the Verification Visit, the PDS will conduct the R.O.R. (Review-Observe-Reflect) model, which includes an observation and a reflection, and review supporting documentation, including proof of infant and toddler/Pediatric first aid certification.

Once all the parts have been completed, the Council reviews the submitted application in conjunction with the results of the CDA Exam and the Professional Development Specialist's feedback and issues a CDA Credential.

== See also ==
- Teacher training

== Notes and references ==
- FACS Classroom Solutions E-zine. Council for Professional Recognition Announces CDA 2.0. McGraw Hill Education. May 17, 2012
- Council for Professional Recognition. The Child Development Associate National Credentialing Program and Competency Standards: Preschool Edition. 1st Edition. Washington, DC. 2013
- Council for Professional Recognition. The Child Development Associate National Credentialing Program and Competency Standards: Infant-Toddler Edition. 1st Edition. Washington, DC. March 2013
- Council for Professional Recognition. The Child Development Associate Assessment System and Competency Standards: Family Child Care Providers. 2nd Edition. Washington, DC. 2011
- Council for Professional Recognition. The Child Development Associate Assessment System and Competency Standards: Home Visitors. 2nd Edition. Washington, DC. 2013
- Exchange Every Day. Child Care Exchange November 23, 2012
