= 2-Amino-4-hydroxy-6-pyrophosphoryl-methylpteridine =

- Skeletal formula of 2-amino-4-hydroxy-6-pyrophosphoryl-methylpteridine

Names
- Preferred IUPAC name (2-Amino-4-oxo-1,4,7,8-tetrahydropteridin-6-yl)methyl trihydrogen diphosphate
- Other names Pteridine diphosphate

Identifiers
CAS Number	3545-84-4
3D model (JSmol)	Interactive image
Beilstein Reference	8397629
ChEBI	CHEBI:15998
ChEMBL	ChEMBL1229984
ChemSpider	646
KEGG	C04807
MeSH	2-Amino-4-hydroxy-6-pyrophosphoryl-methylpteridine
PubChem CID	666
UNII	CFG9B839S3
CompTox Dashboard (EPA)	DTXSID60956857
- InChI: InChI=1S/C7H11N5O8P2/c8-7-11-5-4(6(13)12-7)10-3(1-9-5)2-19-22(17,18)20-21(14,15)16/h1-2H2,(H,17,18)(H2,14,15,16)(H4,8,9,11,12,13) Key: FCQGJGLSOWZZON-UHFFFAOYSA-N
- SMILES: C1C(=NC2=C(N1)NC(=NC2=O)N)COP(=O)(O)OP(=O)(O)O

Properties
Chemical formula	C_{7}H_{11}N_{5}O_{8}P_{2}
Molar mass	355.140 g·mol^{−1}
log P	-2.915
Acidity (pK_{a})	1.252
Basicity (pK_{b})	12.745
- Except where otherwise noted, data are given for materials in their standard state (at 25 °C [77 °F], 100 kPa). Infobox references

2-Amino-4-hydroxy-6-pyrophosphoryl-methylpteridine (7,8-Dihydropterin pyrophosphate, dihydropterin-CH_{2}OH-diphosphate) is a pteridine; a precursor to dihydrofolic acid.

== Biosynthesis ==
The enzyme 2-amino-4-hydroxy-6-hydroxymethyldihydropteridine diphosphokinase converts 6-hydroxymethyl-7,8-dihydropterin to 2-amino-4-hydroxy-6-pyrophosphoryl-methylpteridine by transferring a pyrophosphate group from the cofactor, adenosine triphosphate (ATP).

6-Hydroxymethyl-7,8-dihydropterin
ATP
AMP
ATP
AMP
2-Amino-4-hydroxy-6-pyrophosphoryl-methylpteridine

In organisms including Escherichia coli and Pneumocystis carinii this is a step in the biosynthesis of dihydrofolic acid.
