= Egg binding =

Health problem in egg-laying animals

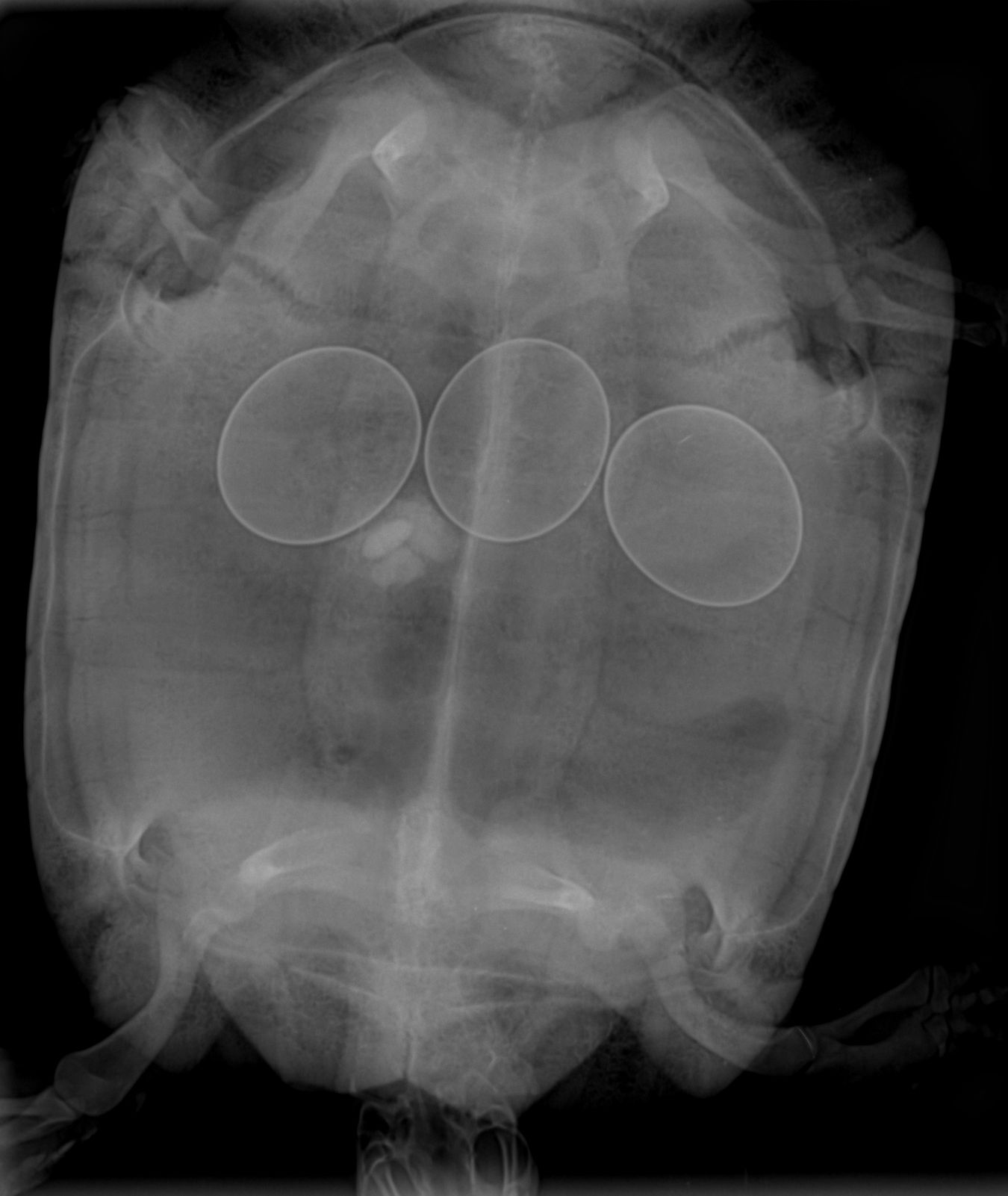
X-ray of a turtle with egg binding.

Egg binding occurs in animals, such as reptiles or birds, when an egg takes longer than usual to pass out of the reproductive tract. It could be considered the oviparous version of a death by childbirth as egg binding can be fatal to the affected mothers and babies.

== In birds ==
In birds, egg binding may be caused by obesity, nutritional imbalances such as calcium deficiency, environmental stress such as temperature changes, or malformed eggs.

The egg may be stuck near the cloaca, or further inside. Egg binding is a relatively common and potentially serious condition that can lead to an infection or damage to internal tissue. The bound egg may be gently massaged out; failing this, it may become necessary to break the egg in situ and remove it in parts. If broken, the oviduct should be cleaned of shell fragments and egg residue to avoid damage or infection.

== In reptiles ==
In reptiles, it is inadvisable to attempt to break a reptile egg to remove it from an egg-bound female. This procedure may be done by a veterinarian, who will insert a needle into the egg, and withdraw the contents with a syringe, allowing the egg to collapse and be removed. Non-surgical interventions include administering oxytocin to improve contractions and allow the egg(s) to pass normally. In many cases, egg-bound reptiles must undergo surgery to have stuck eggs removed.

Egg binding in reptiles is quickly fatal if left untreated; therefore, gravid females who become very lethargic and cease feeding need immediate medical treatment in order to treat the potentially life-threatening condition.

Egg binding can occur if an egg is malformed and/or too large, the animal is weakened by illness, improper husbandry, stress, or if hormonal balances are wrong (producing weak contractions). Factors that can contribute to the risk of egg binding include calcium deficiency, breeding animals that are too young or too small, not providing suitable laying areas (leading to deliberate retention of eggs), and overfeeding of species in which clutch size is dependent on food intake, such as the veiled chameleon.

In the context of behavioral ecology, egg binding can be an important factor in limiting clutch size. Lizards that lay fewer, but larger eggs are at higher risk for egg binding, and so there is selection pressure towards a minimum clutch size. For example, in common side-blotched lizards, females that lay fewer than the average 4–5 eggs per clutch have significantly increased risk of egg binding.

== In popular culture ==
- An episode of the Animal Planet reality show E-Vet Interns featured the treatment of an egg-bound turtle named Napoleon.
- An episode of Netflix animated show Tuca & Bertie, "Yeast Week," featured main character Tuca going to the doctor and undergoing surgery because she is egg-bound.
- Bumpy, an Ankylosaurus character from the animated show Jurassic World: Chaos Theory was egg-bound.
