= Cellular digital accessory =

A cellular digital accessory (CDA) number identifies the software version and customization of a Mobile phone.

Customization, among others, relates to operator-customized startup and shutdown videos, user greeting, web browser's home page and preinstalled bookmarks and also language packs that come preinstalled with the phone. CDA version depends on the country of purchase as well as on the network operator.

The Sony Ericsson Update Service will only allow software updates within one group of CDA numbers.
