= Dihydropteroate synthase =

Class of enzymes

Dihydropteroate synthetase
- Tetrahydrofolate synthesis pathway

Identifiers
- EC no.: 2.5.1.15
- CAS no.: 9055-61-2

Databases
- IntEnz: IntEnz view
- BRENDA: BRENDA entry
- ExPASy: NiceZyme view
- KEGG: KEGG entry
- MetaCyc: metabolic pathway
- PRIAM: profile
- PDB structures: RCSB PDB PDBe PDBsum
- Gene Ontology: AmiGO / QuickGO
Search
- PMC: articles
- PubMed: articles
- NCBI: proteins

Dihydropteroate synthase (DHPS) is an enzyme classified under EC 2.5.1.15. It catalyzes a condensation reaction:

- (2-amino-4-hydroxy-7,8-dihydropteridin-6-yl)methyl diphosphate + 4-aminobenzoate (PABA) $\rightleftharpoons$ diphosphate + dihydropteroate.

This reaction produces dihydropteroate. DHPS is found in archaea, bacteria, some protozoans, fungi, and plants, but not in animals. In non-archaeal organisms, this enzyme participates in folate biosynthesis. In archaea, this enzyme participates in methanopterin biosynthesis. All organisms require a reduced folate/methanopterin cofactor for their one-carbon metabolism. Most microorganisms must synthesize folate de novo because they lack the active transport system of animal cells that allows these organisms to use preformed folates. (Note: Some invertebrates such as C. elegans only have a transporter for reduced folate (i.e. THF, folinic acid, etc.), not oxidized folate, the main form found in food. They can nevertheless make use of oxidized folate by having it break down spontaneously to PABA-glu, which E. coli can turn into PABA intracellularly thanks to a specialized transporter. The THF produced by E. coli is then picked up by the reduced-folate transporter. In contrast, humans can directly use oxidized folates thanks to the proton-coupled folate transporter and have no need for this detour.)

The nonexistence of DHPS in humans (and its essential role in other organisms) makes it a useful target for sulfonamide antibiotics, which compete with the PABA precursor (see dihydropteroate synthase inhibitor). All organisms require reduced folate cofactors

== Examples ==
Bacterial DHPS (gene sul or folP) is a protein of about 275 to 315 amino acid residues that is either chromosomally encoded or found on various antibiotic resistance plasmids.

In the fungus Pneumocystis jirovecii (previously P. carinii) DHPS is the C-terminal domain of a multifunctional folate synthesis enzyme (gene fas) with 2-amino-4-hydroxy-6-hydroxymethyldihydropteridine diphosphokinase (HPPK). A similar arrangement is found in the model plant Arabidopsis thaliana. DHPS is the target of the herbicide asulam.

The Saccharomyces cerevisiae (baker's yeast, a fungus) version is trifunctional: the enzyme has DHPS, HPPK, and dihydroneopterin aldolase.

== Protein domain ==
Pterin binding enzyme

Identifiers
- Symbol: Pterin_bind
- Pfam: PF00809
- InterPro: IPR000489
- PROSITE: PDOC00630
- SCOP2: 1ajz / SCOPe / SUPFAM
Available protein structures:
- PDB: 1twzA:28-230 1twsA:28-230 1twwB:28-230 1tx0A:28-230 1tx2A:28-230 1ad1B:9-210 1ad4A:9-210 1eyeA:11-220 1ajz :20-228 1aj2 :20-228 1aj0 :20-228 2bmbA:509-774 1q8aB:315-515 1q7zB:315-515 1q85A:315-515 1q8jA:315-515 1q7qB:315-515 1q7mA:315-515 1f6yA:1-206 IPR000489 PF00809 (ECOD; PDBsum)
- AlphaFold: IPR000489; PF00809

Proteins containing the pterin-binding enzyme domain include dihydropteroate synthase (EC 2.5.1.15) as well as a group of methyltransferase enzymes including 5-Methyltetrahydrofolate:corrinoid/iron-sulfur protein Co-methyltransferase (MeTr) that catalyses a key step in the Wood-Ljungdahl pathway of carbon dioxide fixation.
