= Dihydroneopterin aldolase =

Enzyme

dihydroneopterin aldolase
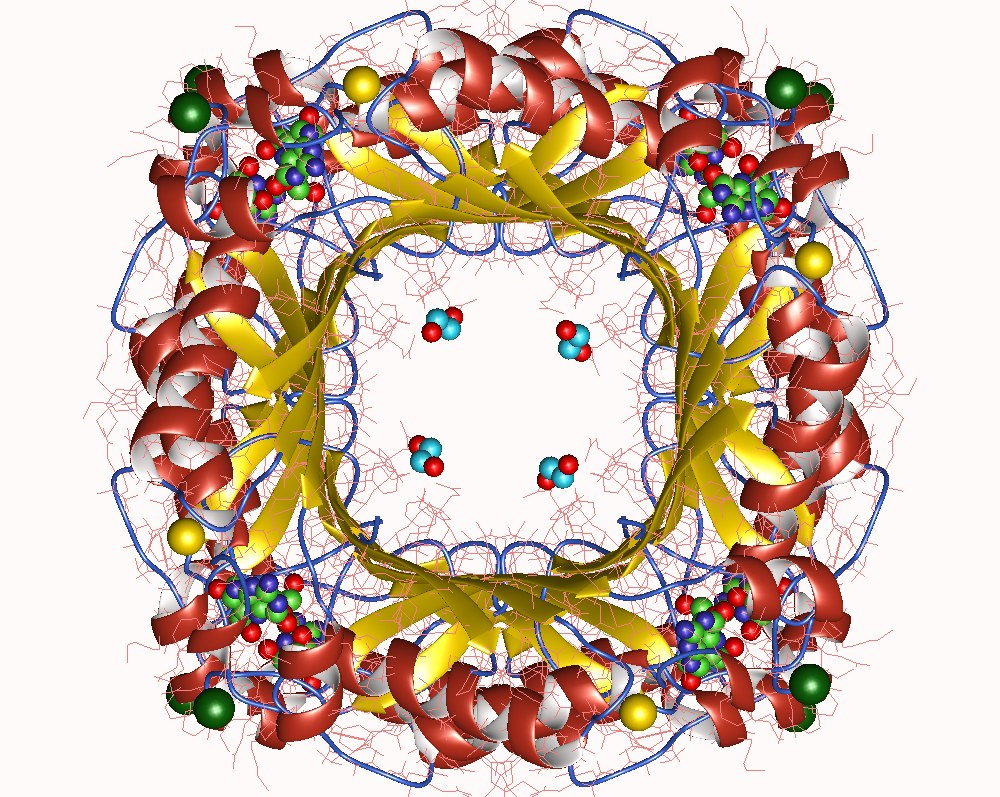
- oktamer

Identifiers
- EC no.: 4.1.2.25
- CAS no.: 37290-59-8

Databases
- IntEnz: IntEnz view
- BRENDA: BRENDA entry
- ExPASy: NiceZyme view
- KEGG: KEGG entry
- MetaCyc: metabolic pathway
- PRIAM: profile
- PDB structures: RCSB PDB PDBe PDBsum
- Gene Ontology: AmiGO / QuickGO
Search
- PMC: articles
- PubMed: articles
- NCBI: proteins

Dihydroneopterin aldolase
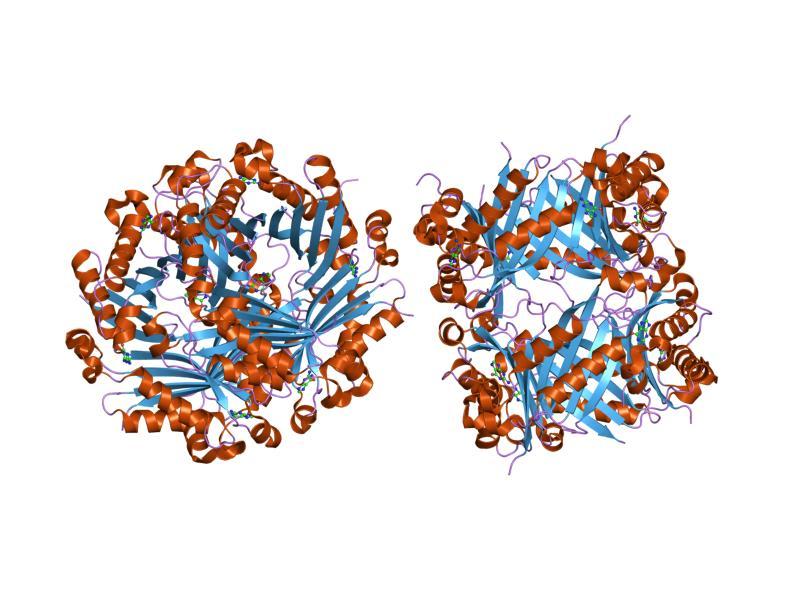
- crystal structure of 7,8-dihydroneopterin aldolase in complex with guanine

Identifiers
- Symbol: FolB
- Pfam: PF02152
- Pfam clan: CL0334
- InterPro: IPR006157
- SCOP2: 1b9l / SCOPe / SUPFAM
Available protein structures:
- PDB: IPR006157 PF02152 (ECOD; PDBsum)
- AlphaFold: IPR006157; PF02152

The enzyme dihydroneopterin aldolase (EC 4.1.2.25) catalyzes the chemical reaction

2-amino-4-hydroxy-6-(D-erythro-1,2,3-trihydroxypropyl)-7,8- dihydropteridine $\rightleftharpoons$ 2-amino-4-hydroxy-6-hydroxymethyl-7,8-dihydropteridine + glycolaldehyde

This enzyme belongs to the family of lyases, specifically the aldehyde-lyases, which cleave carbon-carbon bonds. The systematic name of this enzyme class is 2-amino-4-hydroxy-6-(D-erythro-1,2,3-trihydroxypropyl)-7,8-dihydropt eridine glycolaldehyde-lyase (2-amino-4-hydroxy-6-hydroxymethyl-7,8-dihydropteridine-forming). Other names in common use include 2-amino-4-hydroxy-6-(D-erythro-1,2,3-trihydroxypropyl)-7,8-, and dihydropteridine glycolaldehyde-lyase. This enzyme participates in folate biosynthesis.

== Structural studies ==
As of late 2007, 13 structures have been solved for this class of enzymes, with PDB accession codes 1NBU, 1RRI, 1RRW, 1RRY, 1RS2, 1RS4, 1RSD, 1RSI, 1U68, 1Z9W, 2CG8, 2NM2, and 2NM3.
