= 2-amino-4-hydroxy-6-hydroxymethyldihydropteridine diphosphokinase =

Class of enzyme

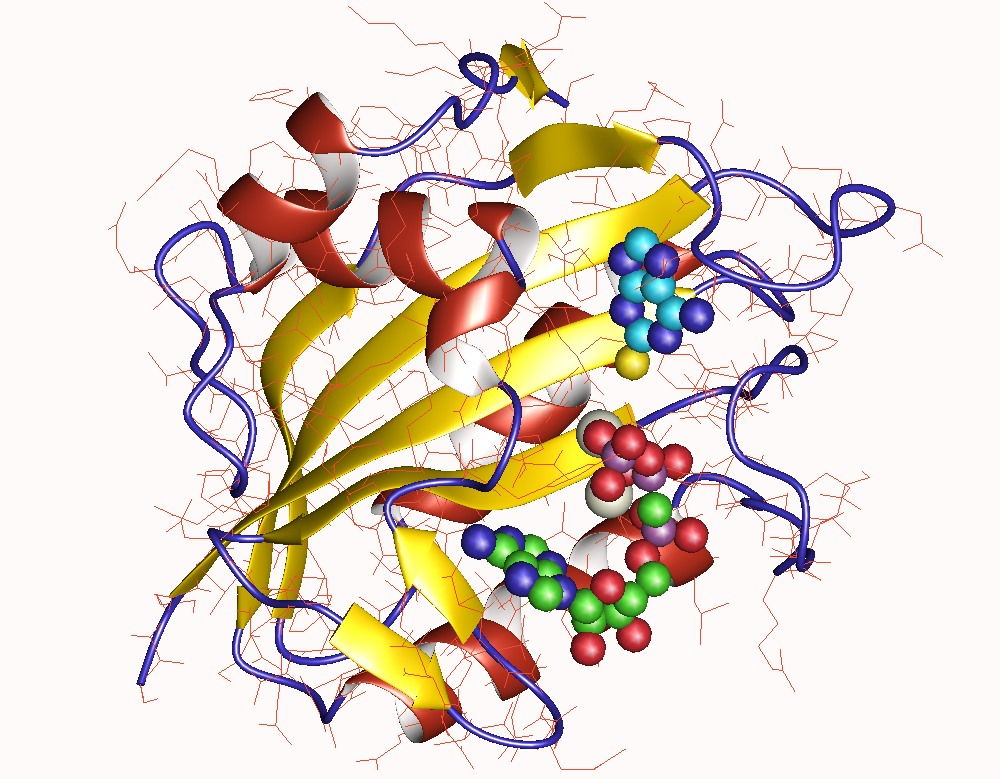
- 2-amino-4-hydroxy-6-hydroxymethyldihydropteridine diphosphokinase monomer, E.Coli

Identifiers
- EC no.: 2.7.6.3
- CAS no.: 37278-23-2

Databases
- BRENDA: enzyme data
- ExPASy: NiceZyme view
- KEGG: enzyme entry
- MetaCyc: metabolic pathway
- Rhea: reactions
- PDB structures: RCSB PDB PDBe PDBsum
- Gene Ontology: AmiGO / QuickGO
Search
- PMC: articles
- PubMed: articles
- NCBI: proteins

7,8-dihydro-6-hydroxymethylpterin-pyrophosphokinase (HPPK)
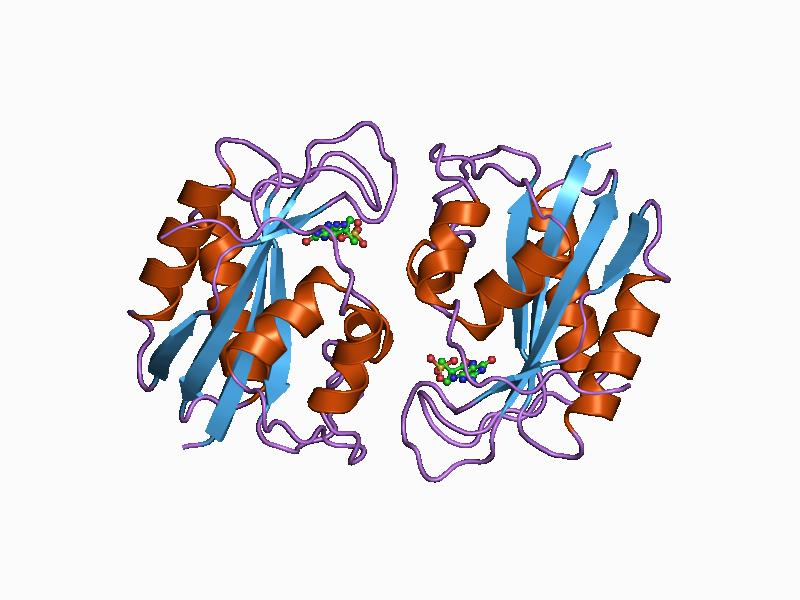
- 7,8-dihydro-6-hydroxymethylpterin-pyrophosphokinase from haemophilus influenzae

Identifiers
- Symbol: HPPK
- Pfam: PF01288
- InterPro: IPR000550
- PROSITE: PDOC00631
- SCOP2: 1hka / SCOPe / SUPFAM
- CDD: cd00483
Available protein structures:
- PDB: IPR000550 PF01288 (ECOD; PDBsum)
- AlphaFold: IPR000550; PF01288

2-amino-4-hydroxy-6-hydroxymethyldihydropteridine diphosphokinase (EC 2.7.6.3) is an enzyme that catalyzes the chemical reaction

6-Hydroxymethyl-7,8-dihydropterin
ATP
AMP
ATP
AMP
2-Amino-4-hydroxy-6-pyrophosphoryl-methylpteridine

The enzyme characterised from Escherichia coli converts 6-hydroxymethyl-7,8-dihydropterin to 2-amino-4-hydroxy-6-pyrophosphoryl-methylpteridine by transferring a pyrophosphate group from the cofactor, adenosine triphosphate (ATP), which is converted to adenosine monophosphate (AMP).

This enzyme catalyses the first step in a three-step pathway leading to 7,8 dihydrofolate. Bacterial HPPK (gene folK or sulD) is a protein of 160 to 270 amino acids. In the lower eukaryote Pneumocystis carinii, HPPK is the central domain of a multifunctional folate synthesis enzyme (gene fas).

== Nomenclature ==
The enzyme is a transferases, specifically one transferring two phosphorus-containing groups (diphosphotransferases). The systematic name of this enzyme class is ATP:2-amino-4-hydroxy-6-hydroxymethyl-7,8-dihydropteridine 6'-diphosphotransferase. Other names in common use include 2-amino-4-hydroxy-6-hydroxymethyldihydropteridine pyrophosphokinase, H2-pteridine-CH_{2}OH pyrophosphokinase, 7,8-dihydroxymethylpterin-pyrophosphokinase, HPPK, 7,8-dihydro-6-hydroxymethylpterin pyrophosphokinase, and hydroxymethyldihydropteridine pyrophosphokinase.

== Structural studies ==
As of late 2007, 23 structures have been solved for this class of enzymes, with Protein Data Bank accession codes PDB: 1DY3, PDB: 1EQ0, PDB: 1EQM, PDB: 1EX8, PDB: 1F9H, PDB: 1F9Y, PDB: 1G4C, PDB: 1HKA, PDB: 1HQ2, PDB: 1IM6, PDB: 1KBR, PDB: 1Q0N, PDB: 1RAO, PDB: 1RB0, PDB: 1RTZ, PDB: 1RU1, PDB: 1RU2, PDB: 1TMJ, PDB: 1TMM, PDB: 2BMB, PDB: 2CG8, PDB: 2F63, and PDB: 2F65.
