= Diabetes Canada =

Charity serving Canadians living with diabetes or prediabetes

- Formation: 1953; 73 years ago
- Location: Toronto, Ontario
- Website: diabetes.ca
- Formerly called: Canadian Diabetes Association

Diabetes Canada (known from 1953 to 2017 as the Canadian Diabetes Association or CDA) is a registered national charity whose mission includes serving the 11 million Canadians living with diabetes or prediabetes. Diabetes Canada programs include:

- Its programs, education and services support people living with diabetes in their daily fight to live as well as possible with diabetes;
- Clinical Practice Guidelines for the Prevention and Management of Diabetes in Canada represent the best evidence-based direction for health-care professionals;
- investments of more than $125 million in diabetes research since 1975; and
- Advocacy efforts have led governments to develop policies that respect the rights of people living with diabetes and access treatments they need to live healthy lives.

== History ==
Dr. Charles Best, a co-inventor of medical insulin, founded the Diabetic Association of Ontario in the late 1940s. As other provinces and territories started to form their own associations, it became clear that if the provincial branches combined their resources they could more effectively serve their membership. This culminated in the formation of the Canadian Diabetes Association in 1953.

On February 13, 2017, the Canadian Diabetes Association became Diabetes Canada.

Today, Diabetes Canada is active in more than 150 Canadian communities and supports people living with diabetes through research, advocacy, education and services. They are supported in their efforts by a community-based network of volunteers, employees, health-care professionals, researchers and partners.

Known as "The Birthplace of Insulin," Banting House, is where Sir Frederick Banting woke up at 2 a.m. on the morning of October 31, 1920 with the idea that led to the discovery of insulin. Diabetes Canada owns Banting House National Historic Site of Canada in London, Ontario.

== Programs ==
D-Camps provide kids with type 1 diabetes with stimulatory experiences in a medically accommodating environment.

Team Diabetes is Diabetes Canada's national activity fundraising program that offers Canadians of all fitness levels the opportunity to walk, run or hike in events across Canada and around the world, while raising funds and awareness.

Clothesline is a program that collects gently used clothing, small household items and electronics. Proceeds from the program support Diabetes Canada.

CDA Expos are educational events in the community.

Diabetes Webinars are free webinars hosted by health-care professionals, diabetes educators and people living well with diabetes.
