= Chlorproguanil =

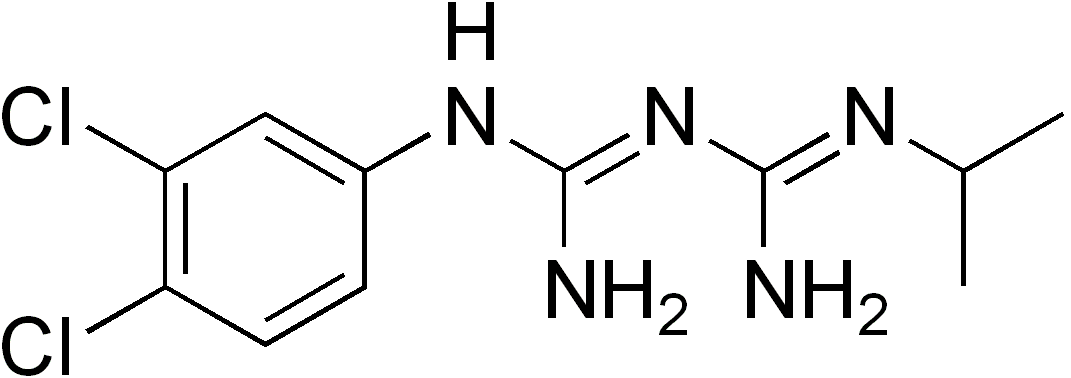

Names
- IUPAC name 1-[Amino-(3,4-dichloroanilino)methylidene]-2-propan-2-ylguanidine

Identifiers
CAS Number	537-21-3
3D model (JSmol)	Interactive image
ChemSpider	20950
ECHA InfoCard	100.007.875
PubChem CID	22323
UNII	8O3249M729
CompTox Dashboard (EPA)	DTXSID5022807
- InChI: InChI=1S/C11H15Cl2N5/c1-6(2)16-10(14)18-11(15)17-7-3-4-8(12)9(13)5-7/h3-6H,1-2H3,(H5,14,15,16,17,18) Key: ISZNZKHCRKXXAU-UHFFFAOYSA-N; InChI=1/C11H15Cl2N5/c1-6(2)16-10(14)18-11(15)17-7-3-4-8(12)9(13)5-7/h3-6H,1-2H3,(H5,14,15,16,17,18) Key: ISZNZKHCRKXXAU-UHFFFAOYAU
- SMILES: Clc1ccc(NC(=N/C(=N/C(C)C)N)N)cc1Cl

Properties
Chemical formula	C_{11}H_{15}Cl_{2}N_{5}
Molar mass	288.18 g/mol
- Except where otherwise noted, data are given for materials in their standard state (at 25 °C [77 °F], 100 kPa). verify (what is ?) Infobox references

Chlorproguanil is an antimalarial drug. In the late 90s and early 2000s, it was studied under collaboration with the UNICEF/UNDP/World Bank Special Program for Research and Training on Tropical Diseases and GlaxoSmithKline. It was a potential alternative to the preexisting combination therapy of chloroquine and sulfadoxine/pyrimethamine, as malaria was showing drug resistance to this approach. It has been trialled in combination therapy with artesunate to treat haemolysis after malaria treatment, however its development was prematurely stopped because of safety concerns secondary to its associated risk of haemolytic anaemia in individuals with glucose-6-phosphate dehydrogenase deficiency.

== See also ==
- Proguanil
- Chlorproguanil hydrochloride-dapsone-artesunate
