= Communicative disorders assistant =

A communicative disorders assistant (CDA) performs hearing and speech-language screenings, prepares therapy materials, implements speech therapy, reports on therapy outcomes, performs routine maintenance on clinical equipment, and works with speech-language pathologists (SLPs) and audiologists to adjust therapy goals. While CDAs cannot perform assessments or set therapy goals, they are a vital part of the therapy team. CDAs are supervised by and work in conjunction with SLPs and audiologists.

While anyone working under the supervision of a speech-language pathologist or audiologist may be considered to be Supportive Personnel, Communicative Disorder Assistants receive their title after being specifically trained and educated in various communicative issues as well as completing field placements in various communication areas (such as fluency, articulation, augmentative and alternative communication, and aural rehabilitation) at various institution types. These may include, but are not limited to school boards, hearing aid manufacturers, acute care hospitals, treatment centres, long-term care facilities, community health units, private agencies, augmentative communication companies and audiology clinics.

== Canadian regulation ==
In Canada, Communicative Disorder Assistants are not regulated, although the Audiologists and Speech-language Pathologists who supervise them typically are regulated under the College of Audiologists and Speech-Language Pathologists of Ontario (CASLPO) or the Canadian Association of Speech-Language Pathologists and Audiologists (CASLPA). The training, supervision, and use of CDAs is specified within these organizations.

The Communicative Disorders Assistant Association of Canada (CDAAC) recognizes for membership only students or graduates of approved Communicative Disorders Assistant programs within Canada (those that include coursework in all areas of communication and prepare students to work with clients of any age).
