= Dihydropteroate =

Names
- IUPAC name 4-{[(2-amino-4-oxo-1,4,7,8-tetrahydropteridin-6-yl)methyl]amino}benzoic acid

Identifiers
CAS Number	2134-76-1
3D model (JSmol)	Interactive image; Interactive image
Beilstein Reference	1226443
ChEBI	CHEBI:4581
ChemSpider	165
KEGG	C00921
PubChem CID	170
UNII	Y3GL4V652E
CompTox Dashboard (EPA)	DTXSID40175605
- InChI: InChI=1S/C14H14N6O3/c15-14-19-11-10(12(21)20-14)18-9(6-17-11)5-16-8-3-1-7(2-4-8)13(22)23/h1-4,16H,5-6H2,(H,22,23)(H4,15,17,19,20,21) Key: WBFYVDCHGVNRBH-UHFFFAOYSA-N; InChI=1/C14H14N6O3/c15-14-19-11-10(12(21)20-14)18-9(6-17-11)5-16-8-3-1-7(2-4-8)13(22)23/h1-4,16H,5-6H2,(H,22,23)(H4,15,17,19,20,21) Key: WBFYVDCHGVNRBH-UHFFFAOYAH
- SMILES: O=C(O)c1ccc(cc1)NCC/2=N/C=3C(=O)\N=C(/NC=3NC\2)N; C1C(=NC2=C(N1)NC(=NC2=O)N)CNC3=CC=C(C=C3)C(=O)O

Properties
Chemical formula	C_{14}H_{14}N_{6}O_{3}
Molar mass	314.3 g/mol

Hazards
- GHS labelling
Pictograms	(GHS06: Toxic)
Signal word	Danger
Hazard statements	H300
Precautionary statements	P264, P301+P310
- Except where otherwise noted, data are given for materials in their standard state (at 25 °C [77 °F], 100 kPa). verify (what is ?) Infobox references

7,8-Dihydropteroate is an important intermediate in folate biosynthesis. It is a pterin created from para-aminobenzoic acid (PABA) by the enzyme dihydropteroate synthase. It is used by dihydrofolate synthase to make dihydrofolic acid.

Tetrahydrofolate synthesis pathway

Bacteriostatic agents such as sulfonamides target dihydropteroate synthetase. The effect of dihydropteroate synthetase inhibition is comparable to that of dihydrofolate reductase inhibition by trimethoprim, another bacteriostatic agent. Combinations of these two drug types, such as the combination trimethoprim/sulfamethoxazole or TMP-SMX), are commonly used to treat recurrent urinary tract, Shigella, Salmonella, and Pneumocystis jirovecii infections, though resistance is known.
