= Dihydrofolate synthase =

Class of enzymes

- Dihydrofolate synthase monomer, E.Coli

Identifiers
- EC no.: 6.3.2.12
- CAS no.: 37318-62-0

Databases
- IntEnz: IntEnz view
- BRENDA: BRENDA entry
- ExPASy: NiceZyme view
- KEGG: KEGG entry
- MetaCyc: metabolic pathway
- PRIAM: profile
- PDB structures: RCSB PDB PDBe PDBsum
- Gene Ontology: AmiGO / QuickGO
Search
- PMC: articles
- PubMed: articles
- NCBI: proteins

In enzymology, a dihydrofolate synthase (EC 6.3.2.12) is an enzyme that catalyzes the chemical reaction

ATP + 7,8-dihydropteroate + L-glutamate $\rightleftharpoons$ ADP + phosphate + 7,8-dihydropteroylglutamate

The 3 substrates of this enzyme are ATP, 7,8-dihydropteroate, and L-glutamate, whereas its 3 products are ADP, phosphate, and 7,8-dihydropteroylglutamate.

This enzyme belongs to the family of ligases, specifically those forming carbon-nitrogen bonds as acid-D-amino-acid ligases (peptide synthases). The systematic name of this enzyme class is 7,8-dihydropteroate:L-glutamate ligase (ADP-forming). Other names in common use include dihydrofolate synthetase, 7,8-dihydrofolate synthetase, H2-folate synthetase, 7,8-dihydropteroate:L-glutamate ligase (ADP), dihydrofolate synthetase-folylpolyglutamate synthetase, folylpoly-(gamma-glutamate) synthetase-dihydrofolate synthase, FHFS, FHFS/FPGS, dihydropteroate:L-glutamate ligase (ADP-forming), and DHFS. This enzyme participates in folate biosynthesis.

== Structural studies ==
As of late 2007, 3 structures have been solved for this class of enzymes, with PDB accession codes 1W78, 1W7K, and 2BMB.
