= Sepiapterin reductase deficiency =

- Other names: SPR deficiency

Sepiapterin reductase deficiency is an inherited pediatric disorder characterized by movement problems, and most commonly displayed as a pattern of involuntary sustained muscle contractions known as dystonia. Symptoms are usually present within the first year of age, but diagnosis is delayed due to physicians lack of awareness and the specialized diagnostic procedures. Individuals with this disorder also have delayed motor skills development including sitting, crawling, and need assistance when walking. Additional symptoms of this disorder include intellectual disability, excessive sleeping, mood swings, and an abnormally small head size. SR deficiency is a very rare condition. The first case was diagnosed in 2001, and since then there have been approximately 30 reported cases. At this time, the condition seems to be treatable, but the lack of overall awareness and the need for a series of atypical procedures used to diagnose this condition pose a dilemma.

== Signs and symptoms ==
=== Cognitive problems ===
- Intellectual disability: Delay in cognitive development
- Extreme mood swings
- Language delay

=== Motor problems ===
- Dystonia: involuntary muscle contractions
- Axial hypotonia: low muscle tone and strength
- Dysarthria: impairment in muscles used for speech
- Muscle stiffness and tremors
- Seizures
- Coordination and balance impairment
- Oculogyric crises: abnormal rotation of the eyes

The oculogyric crises usually occur in the later half of the day and during these episodes patients undergo extreme agitation and irritability along with uncontrolled head and neck movements. Apart from the aforementioned symptoms, patients can also display parkinsonism, sleep disturbances, small head size (microcephaly), behavioral abnormalities, weakness, drooling, and gastrointestinal symptoms.

== Causes ==
This disorder occurs through a mutation in the SPR gene, which is responsible for encoding the sepiapterin reductase enzyme. The enzyme is involved in the last step of producing tetrahydrobiopterin, better known as BH_{4}. BH_{4} is involved in the processing of amino acids and the production of neurotransmitters, specifically that of dopamine and serotonin which are primarily used in transmission of signals between nerve cells in the brain. The mutation in the SPR gene interferes with the production of the enzyme by producing enzymes with little or no function at all. This interference results in a lack of BH_{4} specifically in the brain. The lack of BH_{4} only occurs in the brain because other parts of the body adapt and utilize alternate pathways for the production of BH_{4}. The mutation in the SPR gene leads to nonfunctional sepiapterin reductase enzymes, which results in a lack of BH_{4} and ultimately disrupts the production of dopamine and serotonin in the brain. The disruption of dopamine and serotonin production leads to the visible symptoms present in patients suffering from sepiapterin reductase deficiency. SR deficiency is considered an inherited autosomal recessive condition disorder because each parent carries one copy of the mutated gene, but typically do not show any signs or symptoms of the condition.

== Diagnosis ==
=== CSF neurotransmitter screening ===
The diagnosis of SR deficiency is based on the analysis of the pterins and biogenic amines found in the cerebrospinal fluid (CSF) of the brain. The pterin compound functions as a cofactor in enzyme catalysis and biogenic amines which include adrenaline, dopamine, and serotonin have functions that vary from the control of homeostasis to the management of cognitive tasks. This analysis reveals decreased concentrations of homovanillic acid (HVA), 5-hydroxyindolacetic acid (HIAA), and elevated levels of 7,8-dihydrobiopterin, a compound produced in the synthesis of neurotransmitters. Sepiapterin is not detected by the regularly used methods applied in the investigation of biogenic monoamine metabolites in the cerebrospinal fluid. It must be determined by specialized methods that work by indicating a marked and abnormal increase of sepiapterin in cerebrospinal fluid. Confirmation of the diagnosis occurs by demonstrating high levels of CSF sepiapterin and a marked decrease of SR activity of the fibroblasts along with SPR gene molecular analysis.

== Treatment ==
=== Levodopa and Carbidopa ===
SR deficiency is currently being treated using a combination therapy of levodopa and carbidopa. These treatments are also used for individuals suffering from Parkinson's. The treatment is noninvasive and only requires the patient to take oral tablets 3 or 4 times a day, where the dosage of levodopa and carbidopa is determined by the severity of the symptoms. Levodopa is in a class of medications called central nervous system agents where its main function is to become dopamine in the brain. Carbidopa is in a class of medications called decarboxylase inhibitors and it works by preventing levodopa from being broken down before it reaches the brain. This treatment is effective in mitigating motor symptoms, but it does not totally eradicate them and it is not as effective on cognitive problems. Patients who have been diagnosed with SR deficiency and have undergone this treatment have shown improvements with most motor impairments including oculogyric crises, dystonia, balance, and coordination.

== Case Studies ==
=== Autosomal Recessive DOPA-responsive Dystonia ===
The diagnosis of sepiapterin reductase deficiency in a patient at the age of 14 years was delayed by an earlier diagnosis of an initially unclassified form of methylmalonic aciduria at the age of 2. At that time the hypotonia and delayed development were not considered to be suggestive of a neurotransmitter defect. The clinically relevant diagnosis was only made following the onset of dystonia with diurnal variation, when the patient was a teenager. Variability in occurrence and severity of other symptoms of the condition, such as hypotonia, ataxia, tremors, spasticity, bulbar involvement, oculogyric crises, and cognitive impairment, is comparable with autosomal dominant GTPCH and tyrosine hydroxylase deficiency, which are both classified as forms of DOPA-responsive dystonia.

=== Homozygous Mutation causing Parkinsonism ===
Hypotonia and Parkinsonism were present in two Turkish siblings, brother and sister. By using exome sequencing, which sequences a selective coding region of the genome, researchers have found a homozygous five-nucleotide deletion in the SPR gene which confirmed both siblings were homozygous. It is predicted that this mutation leads to premature translational termination. Translation is the biological process through which proteins are manufactured. The homozygous mutation of the SPR gene in these two siblings exhibiting early-onset Parkinsonism showcases that SPR gene mutations can vary in combinations of clinical symptoms and movement. These differences result in a wider spectrum for the disease phenotype and increases the genetic heterogeneity causing difficulties in diagnosing the disease.

=== Quantification of Sepiapterin in CSF ===
This study examined the clinical history of the CSF and urine of two Greek siblings who were both diagnosed with SR deficiency. Both siblings displayed delayed psychomotor development and a movement disorder. The diagnosis was confirmed by measuring the SR enzyme activity and mutation analysis. The mutation analysis of the gene was performed using genomic DNA isolated from blood samples. The results concluded that both patients have low concentrations of HVA and HIAA and high concentrations of sepiapterin in the CSF, but neopterin and biopterin were abnormal in only one sibling. The results of this research indicates that when diagnosing the SR deficiency, the quantification of sepiapterin in the CSF is more important and indicative of SR deficiency than using neopterin and biopterin alone. The results also show that the urine concentrations of neurotransmitter metabolites are abnormal in patients with this disorder. This finding may provide an initial and easier indication of the deficiency before CSF analysis is performed.

== Figures ==
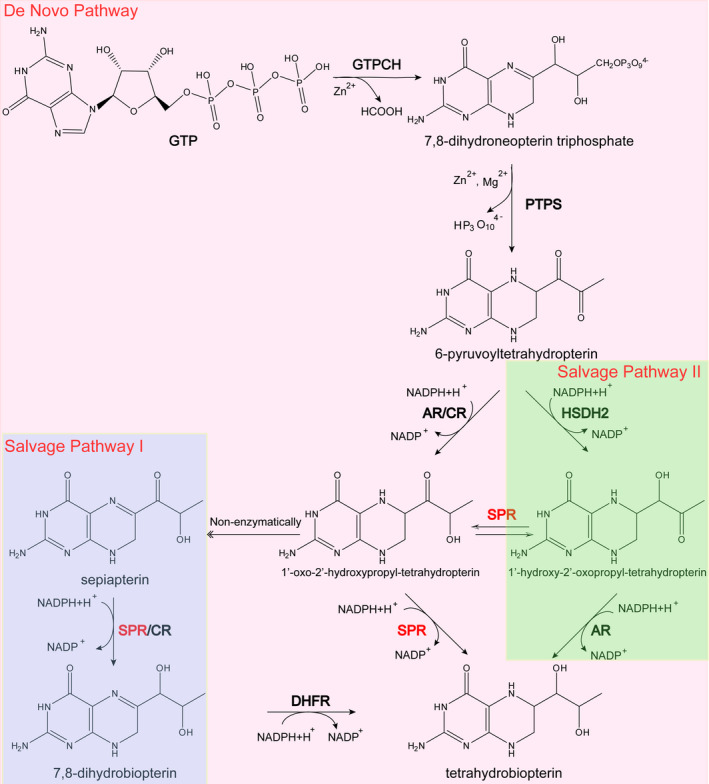
Role of sepiapterine reductase (SPR, in red) in the biosynthesis of tetrahydrobiopterin. From a review by Wu et al., 2020.

== See also ==
- Succinic semialdehyde dehydrogenase deficiency
- Neurotransmitter
- Parkinson's disease
- Cerebral palsy
- Enzyme
- Biochemistry
