= Pterin-4 alpha-carbinolamine dehydratase deficiency =

Pterin-4 alpha-carbinolamine dehydratase deficiency (PCDD) is one of the known forms of tetrahydrobiopterin deficiency. This condition is associated with mutations of the PCBD1 gene. As of 2020, PCDD was the rarest form of BH4 deficiency in terms of cases described in medical literature.

== Symptoms and signs ==
Patients with PCDD are mostly asymptomatic, although they may have transient neurologic deficits in infancy, and sometimes hypomagnesemia and nonautoimmune diabetes mellitus in puberty.

== Diagnosis ==
Pterin-4 alpha-carbinolamine dehydratase deficiency causes hyperphenylalaninemia and therefore can be suspected upon finding elevated levels of phenylalanine. To distinguish it from other forms of BH4 deficiency, further analyses are made. PCDD is associated with elevatel levels of primapterin, especially in urine, while biopterin levels range from low to normal, and neopterin levels from normal to high.

== Treatment ==
Treatment involves a diet with a low phenylalanine content, and sapropterin to help normalize phenylalanine levels. Since phenylalanine levels in this disease have been reported to be only mildly elevated in the majority of patients, relaxation and discontinuation of phenylalanine-reduced diet and/or sapropterin supplementation can be attempted after the first year of life under careful monitoring of phenylalanine levels, according to a consensus guideline published in 2020.
