= Alkylglycerol monooxygenase =

Class of enzymes

alkylglycerol monooxygenase

Identifiers
- EC no.: 1.14.16.5
- CAS no.: 37256-82-9

Databases
- IntEnz: IntEnz view
- BRENDA: BRENDA entry
- ExPASy: NiceZyme view
- KEGG: KEGG entry
- MetaCyc: metabolic pathway
- PRIAM: profile
- PDB structures: RCSB PDB PDBe PDBsum
- Gene Ontology: AmiGO / QuickGO
Search
- PMC: articles
- PubMed: articles
- NCBI: proteins

Alkylglycerol monooxygenase (AGMO) (EC 1.14.16.5) is an enzyme that catalyzes the hydroxylation of alkylglycerols, a specific subclass of ether lipids. This enzyme was first described in 1964 as a pteridine-dependent ether lipid cleaving enzyme. In 2010 finally, the gene coding for alkylglycerol monooxygenase was discovered as transmembrane protein 195 (TMEM195) on chromosome 7. In analogy to the enzymes phenylalanine hydroxylase, tyrosine hydroxylase, tryptophan hydroxylase and nitric oxide synthase, alkylglycerol monooxygenase critically depends on the cofactor tetrahydrobiopterin and iron.

The reaction catalyzed by alkylglycerol monooxygenase:

- 1-alkyl-sn-glycerol + tetrahydrobiopterin + O_{2} $\rightleftharpoons$ 1-hydroxyalkyl-sn-glycerol + 6,7[8H]-dihydrobiopterin + H_{2}O

The unstable intermediate product 1-hydroxyalkyl-sn-glycerol rearranges into the fatty aldehyde and the free glycerol derivative. The fatty aldehyde is then further oxidized to the corresponding acid by fatty aldehyde dehydrogenase.

Alkylglycerol monooxygenase is a membrane-bound mixed-function oxidase and harbours a fatty acid hydroxylase motif. The iron is believed to be coordinated by a diiron center composed of eight histidines, which can be found in all enzymes containing this motif.

== Nomenclature ==
The systematic name for this enzyme is 1-alkyl-sn-glycerol,tetrahydrobiopterin:oxygen oxidoreductase. Other names in use are glyceryl-ether monooxygenase, glyceryl-ether cleaving enzyme, glyceryl ether oxygenase, glyceryl etherase, and O-alkylglycerol monooxygenase.
