= Biopterin =

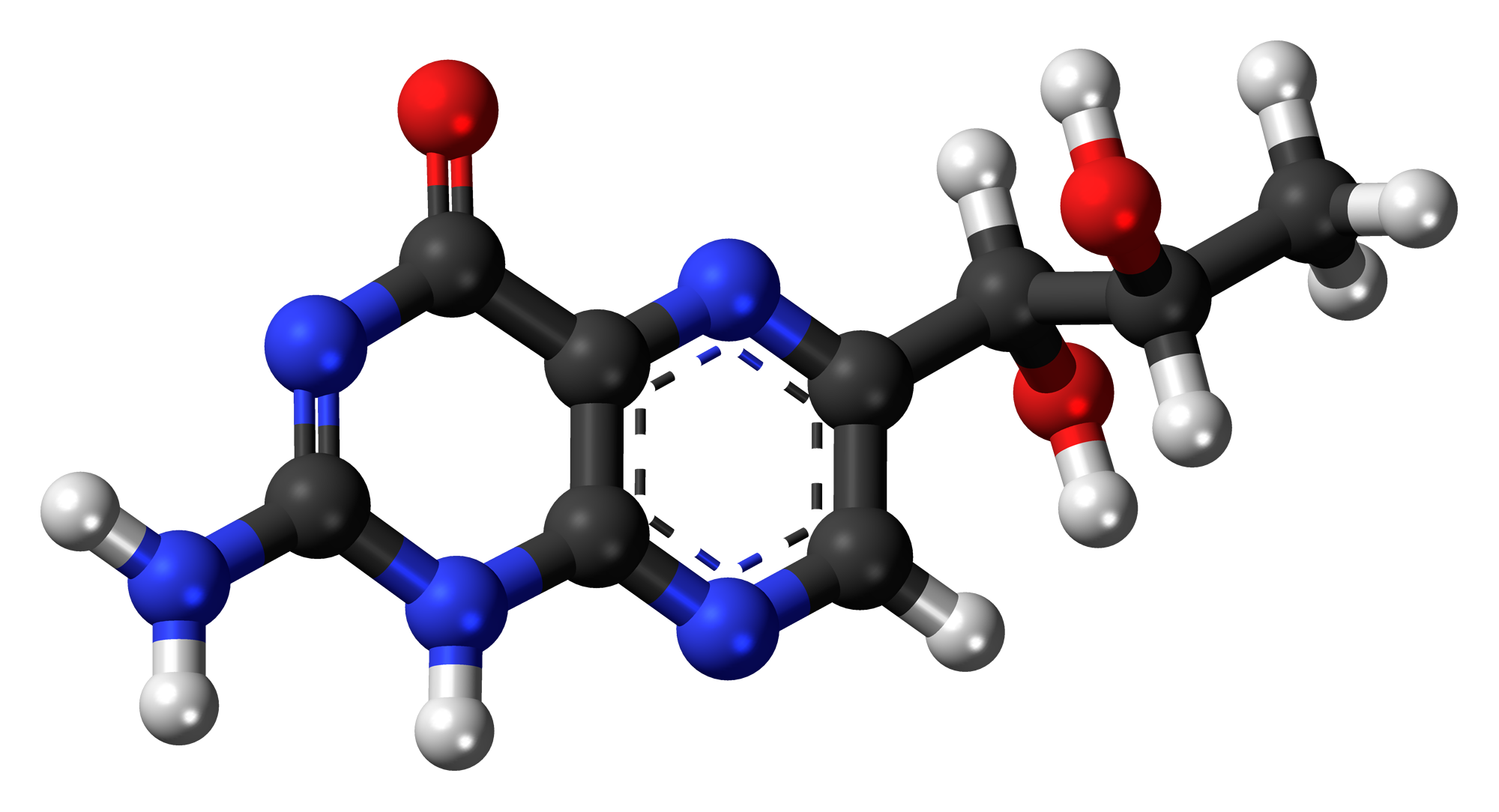

Names
- IUPAC name 2-Amino-6-(1,2-dihydroxypropyl)-1H-pteridin-4-one

Identifiers
CAS Number	22150-76-1
3D model (JSmol)	Interactive image; Interactive image
ChemSpider	392795
ECHA InfoCard	100.040.719
KEGG	C06313
MeSH	Biopterin
PubChem CID	445040
UNII	E54CTM794Y
CompTox Dashboard (EPA)	DTXSID30912041
- InChI: InChI=1S/C9H11N5O3/c1-3(15)6(16)4-2-11-7-5(12-4)8(17)14-9(10)13-7/h2-3,6,15-16H,1H3,(H3,10,11,13,14,17)/t3-,6-/m0/s1 Key: LHQIJBMDNUYRAM-DZSWIPIPSA-N; InChI=1/C9H11N5O3/c1-3(15)6(16)4-2-11-7-5(12-4)8(17)14-9(10)13-7/h2-3,6,15-16H,1H3,(H3,10,11,13,14,17) Key: LHQIJBMDNUYRAM-UHFFFAOYAC; InChI=1/C9H11N5O3/c1-3(15)6(16)4-2-11-7-5(12-4)8(17)14-9(10)13-7/h2-3,6,15-16H,1H3,(H3,10,11,13,14,17)/t3-,6-/m0/s1 Key: LHQIJBMDNUYRAM-DZSWIPIPBD
- SMILES: O=C2\N=C(/Nc1ncc(nc12)C(O)C(O)C)N; O=C2\N=C(/Nc1ncc(nc12)[C@@H](O)[C@@H](O)C)N

Properties
Chemical formula	C_{9}H_{11}N_{5}O_{3}
Molar mass	237.216 g/mol
- Except where otherwise noted, data are given for materials in their standard state (at 25 °C [77 °F], 100 kPa). verify (what is ?) Infobox references

Biopterins are pterin derivatives which function as endogenous enzyme cofactors in many species of animals and in some bacteria and fungi. The prototypical compound of the class is biopterin (6-(1,2-dihydroxypropyl)-pterin), as shown in the infobox. Biopterins act as cofactors for aromatic amino acid hydroxylases (AAAH), which are involved in synthesizing a number of neurotransmitters including dopamine, norepinephrine, epinepherine, and serotonin, along with several trace amines. Nitric oxide synthesis also uses biopterin derivatives as cofactors. In humans, tetrahydrobiopterin (BH4) is the endogenous cofactor for AAAH enzymes.

As with pterins in general, biopterins exhibit tautomerism. In other words, there are a number of forms that readily interconvert, differing by the placement of hydrogen atoms. Depictions of the chemical structure may therefore vary among sources.

== Compounds ==
Biopterin compounds found in the animal body include BH4, the free radical BH3•, and the semi-oxidized form BH2. The fully oxidized form, i.e. "biopterin" proper, has little biological significance.

Bacteria produce several unique glycosides of biopterin (and of other pterins as well), using a specific BPt glucosyltransferase. They may have a function in UV protection.

== Biosynthesis ==
BH4 is the principal active cofactor. BH4 synthesis occurs through two principal pathways; the de novo pathway involves three enzymatic steps and proceeds from GTP, while the salvage pathway converts sepiapterin to BH4 using dihydrofolate reductase. In addition, BH2 is recycled to BH4 by dihydrobiopterin reductase.

In the de novo pathway, GTP is converted to 7,8-dihydroneopterin triphosphate by GTP cyclohydrolase I (GTPCH-1, FolE), which expands the imidazole ring in GTP by one carbon. The intermediate is converted to 6-pyruvoyl-5,6,7,8-tetrahydropterin by 6-pyruvoyltetrahydropterin synthase, which removes the phosphate and produces the diketone (pyruvoyl) substituent. The final stage is mediated by sepiapterin reductase.

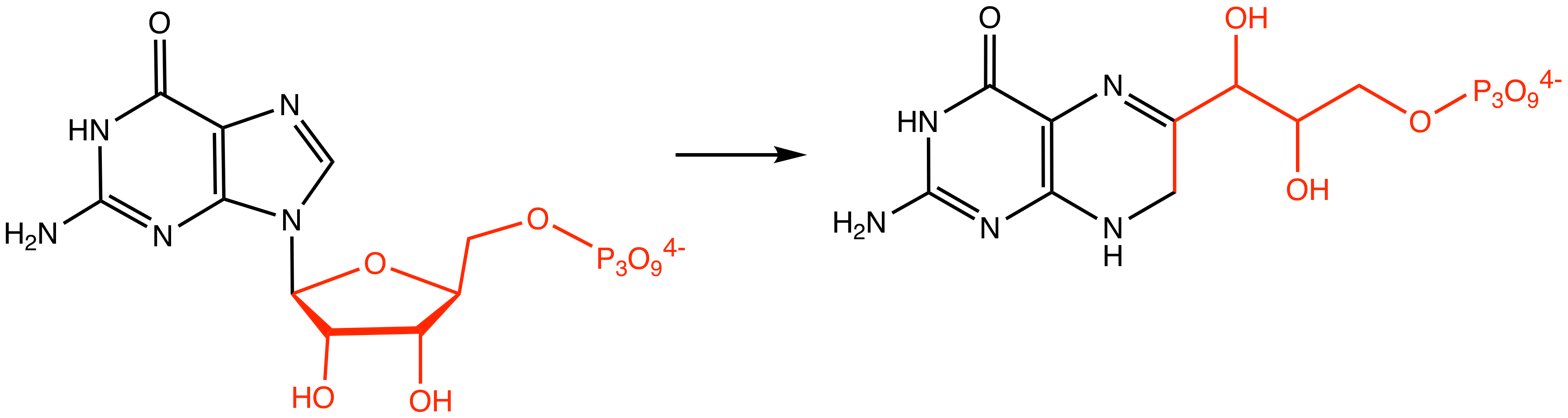
step in biosynthesis of dihydroneopterin from GTP.

== Biopterin disorders ==
A number of disorders of biopterin regulation exist.

Single-gene defects affecting the gene GCH1 block the first step in biopterin synthesis, and lead to dopamine-responsive dystonia, also known as Segawa's syndrome. This is due to the role of BH4 in synthesising neurotransmitters, including Dopamine, and is treated with supplementation with levodopa, which does not require BH4 for conversion to dopamine. GCH1 defects are autosomal dominant, meaning that only one defective gene copy is required for the condition to occur. Mouse gene knockout models that block biopterin synthesis completely die shortly after birth due to their inability to produce catecholamines and neurotransmitters.

Biopterin synthesis disorders are also a cause of hyperphenylalaninemia; phenylalanine metabolism requires BH4 as a cofactor.

In psychiatry, imbalances of biopterin concentrations have been hypothesized to be linked to mood disorders, particularly depression.
