= Dihydrobiopterin =

- L-erythro-7,8-dihydrobiopterin

Names
- IUPAC name 2-Amino-6-(1,2-dihydroxypropyl)-7,8-dihydro-1H-pteridin-4-one
- Other names 7,8-Dihydrobiopterin

Identifiers
CAS Number	6779-87-9
3D model (JSmol)	Interactive image
ChEBI	CHEBI:64240
ChemSpider	106382
KEGG	C02953
PubChem CID	135398687
UNII	AYP47DS84P
CompTox Dashboard (EPA)	DTXSID00987125
- InChI: InChI=1S/C9H13N5O3/c1-3(15)6(16)4-2-11-7-5(12-4)8(17)14-9(10)13-7/h3,6,15-16H,2H2,1H3,(H4,10,11,13,14,17)/t3-,6-/m0/s1 Key: FEMXZDUTFRTWPE-DZSWIPIPSA-N
- SMILES: CC(C(C1=NC2=C(NC1)NC(=NC2=O)N)O)O

Properties
Chemical formula	C_{9}H_{13}N_{5}O_{3}
Molar mass	239.235 g·mol^{−1}
- Except where otherwise noted, data are given for materials in their standard state (at 25 °C [77 °F], 100 kPa). Infobox references

Dihydrobiopterin (BH_{2}) is a pteridine compound produced in the synthesis of L-DOPA, dopamine, serotonin, norepinephrine and epinephrine. It is restored to the required cofactor tetrahydrobiopterin by dihydrobiopterin reductase.

== Biochemistry ==
Dihydrobiopterin is an intermediate in the pathway to the cofactor, tetrahydrobiopterin, which is used by three aromatic amino acid hydroxylase enzymes which are important in the metabolism of the amino acid phenylalanine and to make the neurotransmitters serotonin, melatonin, dopamine, noradrenaline, and adrenaline.

In higher organisms, tetrahydrobiopterin is derived from guanosine triphosphate by the action of a sequence of three enzymes GTP cyclohydrolase, 6-pyruvoyltetrahydropterin synthase and sepiapterin reductase. The final enzyme performs a stepwise reduction of L-sepiapterin

L-sepiapterin
+ NADH
H^{+}
H^{+}
dihydrobiopterin
+ NAD^{+}
dihydrobiopterin
+ NADH
2 H^{+}
2 H^{+}
tetrahydrobiopterin
+ NAD^{+}

In some bacteria, for example Chlorobium tepidum, the reduction of L-sepiapterin leads to the L-threo isomer of dihydrobiopterin.

L-sepiapterin
+ NADPH
H^{+}
H^{+}
L-threo-7,8-dihydrobiopterin
+ NAPD^{+}

=== Quinonoid isomer ===
When tetrahydrobiopterin is used in oxidation reactions as an enzyme cofactor, it can be converted into an alternative isomer of the L-erythro-7,8-dihydrobiopterin form of dihydrobiopterin that is involved in the biosynthesis. This compound, called (6R)-L-erythro-6,7-dihydrobiopterin, is unstable and may spontaneously revert to the more stable isomer. Nevertheless, the enzyme 6,7-dihydropteridine reductase acts directly on it to allow its recycling to tetrahydrobiopterin:

quinonoid isomer
+ 2 NADH
2 H^{+}
2 H^{+}
recycled cofactor
+ 2 NAD^{+}

== See also ==
- Pteridine
- Dihydropteridine reductase deficiency
