= Pteridine reductase =

Identifiers
- EC no.: 1.5.1.33
- CAS no.: 131384-61-7

Databases
- IntEnz: IntEnz view
- BRENDA: BRENDA entry
- ExPASy: NiceZyme view
- KEGG: KEGG entry
- MetaCyc: metabolic pathway
- PRIAM: profile
- PDB structures: RCSB PDB PDBe PDBsum
Search
- PMC: articles
- PubMed: articles
- NCBI: proteins

Pteridine reductase (EC 1.5.1.33) is an enzyme that catalyzes the chemical reaction

biopterin
+ 2 NADPH
2 H^{+}
2 H^{+}
tetrahydrobiopterin
+ 2 NADP^{+}

The substrates of this enzyme are biopterin, reduced nicotinamide adenine dinucleotide phosphate (NADPH), and two protons. Its products are tetrahydrobiopterin and oxidised NADP^{+}. It was isolated from the parasite Leishmania major.

This enzyme belongs to the family of oxidoreductases, specifically those acting on the CH-NH group of donors with NAD+ or NADP+ as acceptor. The systematic name of this enzyme class is 5,6,7,8-tetrahydrobiopterin:NADP+ oxidoreductase. Other names in common use include PTR1, and pteridine reductase 1.

== Structural studies ==
As of late 2007, 7 structures have been solved for this class of enzymes, with PDB accession codes 1W0C, 2BF7, 2BFA, 2BFM, 2BFO, 2BFP, and 2C7V.
