= QDPR =

Human gene

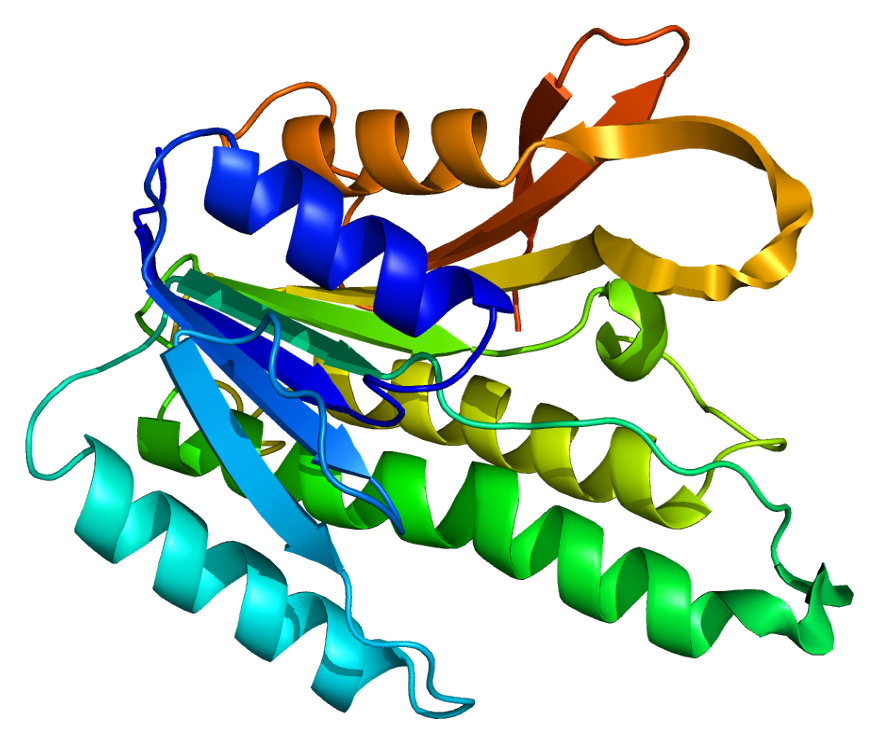

Identifiers
- Aliases: QDPR, DHPR, PKU2, SDR33C1, quinoid dihydropteridine reductase, HDHPR
- External IDs: OMIM: 612676; MGI: 97836; GeneCards: QDPR
Available structures
PDB	Ortholog search: PDBe RCSB
PDB	List of PDB id codes 1HDR

Gene location (Human)
Chr.	Chromosome 4 (human)
Band	4p15.32	Start	17,460,261 bp
Band	4p15.32	End	17,512,206 bp

Gene location (Mouse)
Chr.	Chromosome 5 (mouse)
Band	5 B3|5 24.9 cM	Start	45,591,363 bp
Band	5 B3|5 24.9 cM	End	45,607,578 bp
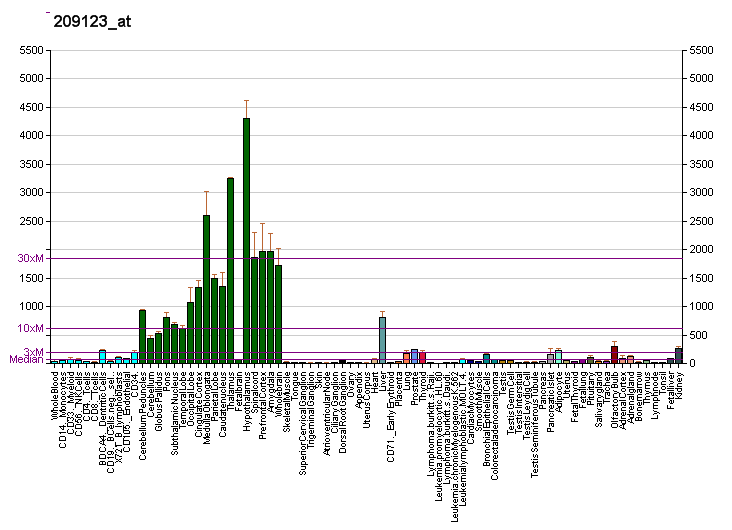
RNA expression pattern
Bgee	Human / Mouse (ortholog); Top expressed in: inferior ganglion of vagus nerve; external globus pallidus; superior vestibular nucleus; pars reticulata; pars compacta; inferior olivary nucleus; ventral tegmental area; thalamus; subthalamic nucleus; pons / Top expressed in: substantia nigra; deep cerebellar nuclei; Paneth cell; lateral geniculate nucleus; globus pallidus; medial geniculate nucleus; ventral tegmental area; medial vestibular nucleus; dorsal tegmental nucleus; lateral hypothalamus; More reference expression data
BioGPS	More reference expression data
Gene ontology
Molecular function	protein homodimerization activity; 6,7-dihydropteridine reductase activity; NADPH binding; NADH binding; electron transfer activity; oxidoreductase activity
Cellular component	cytoplasm; cytosol; mitochondrion; neuron projection; extracellular exosome
Biological process	response to glucagon; cellular amino acid metabolic process; L-phenylalanine catabolic process; dihydrobiopterin metabolic process; response to lead ion; response to aluminum ion; tetrahydrobiopterin biosynthetic process; liver development; electron transport chain
Sources:Amigo / QuickGO
Orthologs
Databases	NCBI: entry; OMA: entry
Species	Human	Mouse
Entrez	5860	110391
Ensembl	ENSG00000151552	ENSMUSG00000015806
UniProt	P09417	Q8BVI4
RefSeq (mRNA)	NM_000320; NM_001306140	NM_024236
RefSeq (protein)	NP_000311; NP_001293069	NP_077198
Location (UCSC)	Chr 4: 17.46 – 17.51 Mb	Chr 5: 45.59 – 45.61 Mb
PubMed search
- Wikidata
View/Edit Human	View/Edit Mouse

QDPR (quinoid dihydropteridine reductase) is a human gene that produces the enzyme quinoid dihydropteridine reductase. This enzyme is part of the pathway that recycles a substance called tetrahydrobiopterin, also known as BH4. Tetrahydrobiopterin works with an enzyme called phenylalanine hydroxylase to process a substance called phenylalanine. Phenylalanine is an amino acid (a building block of proteins) that is obtained through the diet; it is found in all proteins and in some artificial sweeteners. When tetrahydrobiopterin interacts with phenylalanine hydroxylase, tetrahydrobiopterin is altered and must be recycled to a usable form. The regeneration of this substance is critical for the proper processing of several other amino acids in the body. Tetrahydrobiopterin also helps produce certain chemicals in the brain called neurotransmitters, which transmit signals between nerve cells.

The QDPR gene is located on the short (p) arm of chromosome 4 at position 15.31, from base pair 17,164,291 to base pair 17,189,981.

In melanocytic cells QDPR gene expression may be regulated by MITF.

== Related conditions ==
Mutations in the QDPR gene cause dihydropteridine reductase deficiency, one of the subtypes of tetrahydrobiopterin deficiency. More than 30 disorder-causing mutations in this gene have been identified, including aberrant splicing, amino acid substitutions, insertions, or premature terminations. These mutations completely, or almost completely, inactivate quinoid dihydropteridine reductase, which prevents the normal recycling of tetrahydrobiopterin. In the absence of usable tetrahydrobiopterin, the body cannot process phenylalanine correctly. As a result, phenylalanine from the diet builds up in the bloodstream and other tissues and can lead to brain damage. Neurotransmitters in the brain are also affected, resulting in delayed development, seizures, movement disorders, and other symptoms.

In addition, a reduction in the activity of quinoid dihydropteridine reductase may cause calcium to build up abnormally in certain parts of the brain, resulting in damage to nerve cells.
