= Sepiapterin reductase (L-threo-7,8-dihydrobiopterin forming) =

Identifiers
- EC no.: 1.1.1.325
- CAS no.: 9059-48-7

Databases
- BRENDA: enzyme data
- ExPASy: NiceZyme view
- KEGG: enzyme entry
- MetaCyc: metabolic pathway
- Rhea: reactions
- PDB structures: RCSB PDB PDBe PDBsum
Search
- PMC: articles
- PubMed: articles
- NCBI: proteins

Sepiapterin reductase (L-threo-7,8-dihydrobiopterin forming) (EC 1.1.1.325) is an enzyme with systematic name L-threo-7,8-dihydrobiopterin:NADP^{+} oxidoreductase. This enzyme catalyses the following two chemical reactions:

L-threo-7,8-dihydrobiopterin
+ NAPD^{+}
H^{+}
H^{+}
L-sepiapterin
+ NADPH
(6R)-L-threo-tetrahydrobiopterin
+ 2 NADP^{+}
2 H^{+}
2 H^{+}
(R)-dyspropterin
+ 2 NADPH

This bacterial (Chlorobium tepidum) enzyme catalyses the final step in the de novo synthesis of tetrahydrobiopterin from GTP.
