= C9H13N5O3 =

The molecular formula C_{9}H_{13}N_{5}O_{3} (molar mass: 239.235 g/mol) may refer to:

- Dihydrobiopterin (BH_{2})
- S2242
