= Sepiapterin deaminase =

Class of enzymes

Identifiers
- EC no.: 3.5.4.24
- CAS no.: 62213-22-3

Databases
- BRENDA: enzyme data
- ExPASy: NiceZyme view
- KEGG: enzyme entry
- MetaCyc: metabolic pathway
- Rhea: reactions
- PDB structures: RCSB PDB PDBe PDBsum
- Gene Ontology: AmiGO / QuickGO
Search
- PMC: articles
- PubMed: articles
- NCBI: proteins

Sepiapterin deaminase (EC 3.5.4.24) is an enzyme characterised from silkworm that catalyzes the hydrolysis of sepiapterin to xanthopterin-B2:

sepiapterin
H_{2}O
NH_{3}
xanthopterin-B2

The product is a biosynthetic intermediate to a type of compound called a lumazine and the enzyme contributes to pterin pathways, especially in insects.

This enzyme is hydrolase, one acting on carbon-nitrogen bonds other than peptide bonds, specifically in cyclic amidines. The systematic name of this enzyme class is sepiapterin aminohydrolase.
