= C9H11N5O3 =

The molecular formula C_{9}H_{11}N_{5}O_{3} (molar mass: 237.21 g/mol, exact mass: 237.0862 u) may refer to:

- Biopterin
- Dyspropterin
- Sepiapterin
