= DHPR =

DHPR may refer to:

- 6,7-dihydropteridine reductase, an enzyme
- dihydropyridine receptor, a calcium channel
