= Pterin deaminase =

Calss of enzymes

Identifiers
- EC no.: 3.5.4.11
- CAS no.: 9025-04-1

Databases
- BRENDA: enzyme data
- ExPASy: NiceZyme view
- KEGG: enzyme entry
- MetaCyc: metabolic pathway
- Rhea: reactions
- PDB structures: RCSB PDB PDBe PDBsum
- Gene Ontology: AmiGO / QuickGO
Search
- PMC: articles
- PubMed: articles
- NCBI: proteins

Pterin deaminase (EC 3.5.4.11) is an enzyme characterised from bacteria and rat liver that catalyzes the hydrolysis of pterin to 2,4-dihydroxypteridine (lumazine) and ammonia:

pterin
H_{2}O
NH_{3}
lumazine

The enzyme is widely present in prokaryotes and in some eukaryotes and is active on substituted pterins. It plays an important role in regulating regulation of purine and pyrimidine metabolism.

This enzyme is a hydrolase, one acting on carbon-nitrogen bonds other than peptide bonds, specifically in cyclic amidines. The systematic name of this enzyme class is 2-amino-4-hydroxypteridine aminohydrolase. It is also called acrasinase.
