= Pteridine oxidase =

pteridine oxidase

Identifiers
- EC no.: 1.17.3.1
- CAS no.: 74082-65-8

Databases
- IntEnz: IntEnz view
- BRENDA: BRENDA entry
- ExPASy: NiceZyme view
- KEGG: KEGG entry
- MetaCyc: metabolic pathway
- PRIAM: profile
- PDB structures: RCSB PDB PDBe PDBsum
- Gene Ontology: AmiGO / QuickGO
Search
- PMC: articles
- PubMed: articles
- NCBI: proteins

In enzymology, a pteridine oxidase (EC 1.17.3.1) is an enzyme that catalyzes the chemical reaction

2-amino-4-hydroxypteridine + O_{2} $\rightleftharpoons$ 2-amino-4,7-dihydroxypteridine + (?)

Thus, the two substrates of this enzyme are 2-amino-4-hydroxypteridine and O_{2}, whereas its product is 2-amino-4,7-dihydroxypteridine.

This enzyme belongs to the family of oxidoreductases, specifically those acting on CH or CH_{2} groups with oxygen as acceptor. The systematic name of this enzyme class is 2-amino-4-hydroxypteridine:oxygen oxidoreductase (7-hydroxylating).
