= PCBD1 =

Protein-coding gene in the species Homo sapiens

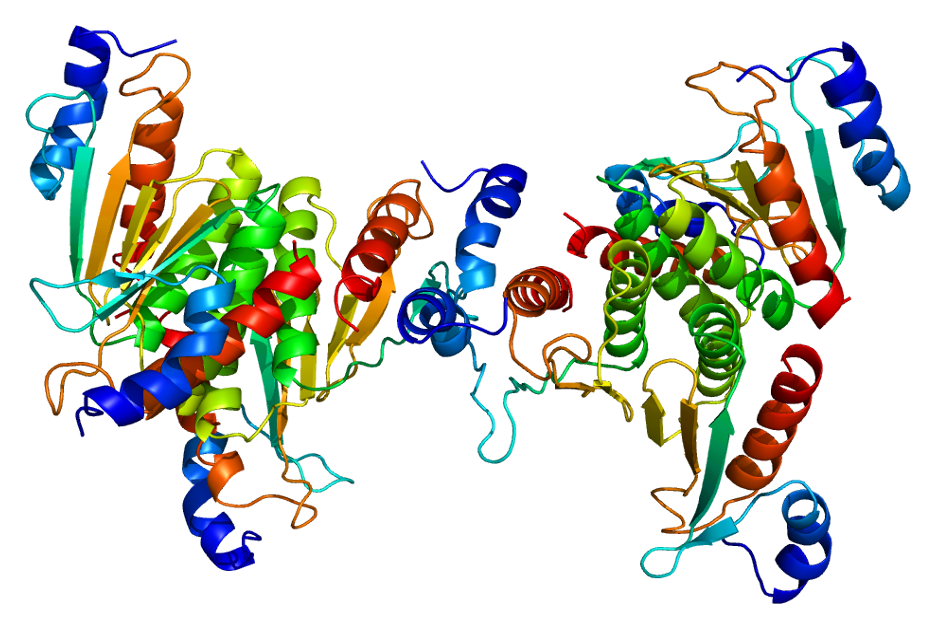

Identifiers
- Aliases: PCBD1, DCOH, PCBD, PCD, PHS, pterin-4 alpha-carbinolamine dehydratase 1
- External IDs: OMIM: 126090; MGI: 94873; GeneCards: PCBD1
Available structures
PDB	Ortholog search: PDBe RCSB
PDB	List of PDB id codes 1DCH, 1F93, 1DCO, 1DCP
Enzyme activity
EC #	BRENDA	ExPASy	KEGG	MetaCyc
4.2.1.96	↗	↗	↗	↗

Gene location (Human)
Chr.	Chromosome 10 (human)
Band	10q22.1	Start	70,882,280 bp
Band	10q22.1	End	70,888,565 bp

Gene location (Mouse)
Chr.	Chromosome 10 (mouse)
Band	10 B4|10 32.14 cM	Start	60,925,110 bp
Band	10 B4|10 32.14 cM	End	60,930,103 bp
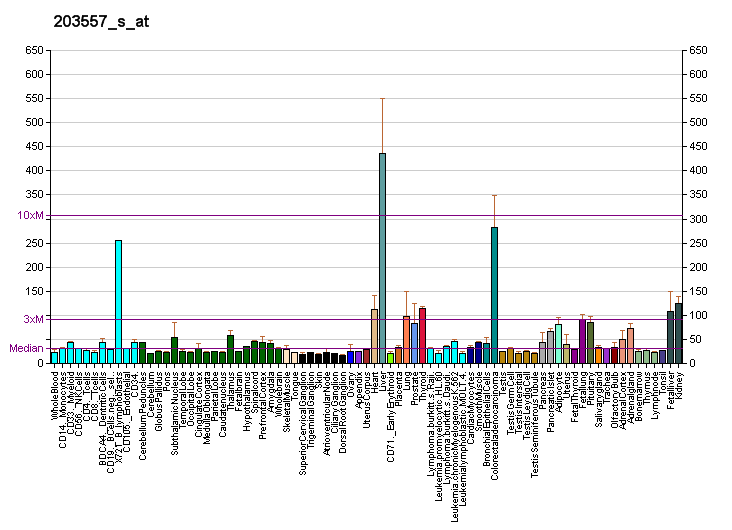
RNA expression pattern
Bgee	Human / Mouse (ortholog); Top expressed in: right lobe of liver; body of pancreas; right adrenal cortex; left adrenal gland; left adrenal cortex; apex of heart; mucosa of transverse colon; body of stomach; right auricle of heart; muscle layer of sigmoid colon / Top expressed in: right kidney; yolk sac; proximal tubule; left lobe of liver; human kidney; islet of Langerhans; epithelium of stomach; lumbar spinal ganglion; migratory enteric neural crest cell; Ileal epithelium; More reference expression data
BioGPS	More reference expression data
Gene ontology
Molecular function	transcription coactivator activity; phenylalanine 4-monooxygenase activity; protein binding; lyase activity; identical protein binding; 4-alpha-hydroxytetrahydrobiopterin dehydratase activity
Cellular component	nucleoplasm; extracellular exosome; nucleus; cytoplasm; cytosol
Biological process	regulation of transcription, DNA-templated; protein heterooligomerization; L-phenylalanine catabolic process; transcription, DNA-templated; positive regulation of transcription, DNA-templated; tetrahydrobiopterin biosynthetic process; protein homotetramerization; regulation of protein homodimerization activity; L-phenylalanine metabolic process
Sources:Amigo / QuickGO
Orthologs
Databases	NCBI: entry; OMA: entry
Species	Human	Mouse
Entrez	5092	13180
Ensembl	ENSG00000166228	ENSMUSG00000020098
UniProt	P61457	P61458
RefSeq (mRNA)	NM_000281; NM_001289797; NM_001323004; NM_001001939	NM_025273
RefSeq (protein)	NP_000272; NP_001276726; NP_001309933	NP_079549
Location (UCSC)	Chr 10: 70.88 – 70.89 Mb	Chr 10: 60.93 – 60.93 Mb
PubMed search
- Wikidata
View/Edit Human	View/Edit Mouse

Pterin-4-alpha-carbinolamine dehydratase is an enzyme that in humans is encoded by the PCBD1 gene.

== Function ==
This gene encodes pterin-4 alpha-carbinolamine dehydratase, an enzyme involved in phenylalanine hydroxylation. The enzyme regulates the homodimerization of the transcription factor hepatocyte nuclear factor 1 (HNF1).

== Clinical significance ==
Mutations of the PCBD1 gene cause pterin-4 alpha-carbinolamine dehydratase deficiency, one of the forms of tetrahydrobiopterin deficiency.

== Interactions ==
PCBD1 has been shown to interact with DYRK1B and HNF1A.
