= DNAJC12 =

Protein-coding gene in the species Homo sapiens

An Error has occurred retrieving Wikidata item for infobox

DnaJ heat shock protein family (Hsp40) member C12 is a protein that in humans is encoded by the DNAJC12 gene.

== Function ==
This gene encodes a member of a subclass of the HSP40/DnaJ protein family. Members of this family of proteins are associated with complex assembly, protein folding, and export. Two transcript variants encoding distinct isoforms have been identified for this gene.

== Pathology ==
Mutations of the gene cause mild non-BH4-deficient hyperphenylalaninemia (HPANBH4), also called DNAJC12-deficient hyperphenylalaninemia or DNAJC12 deficiency.
