= 6,7-dihydropteridine reductase =

Class of enzymes

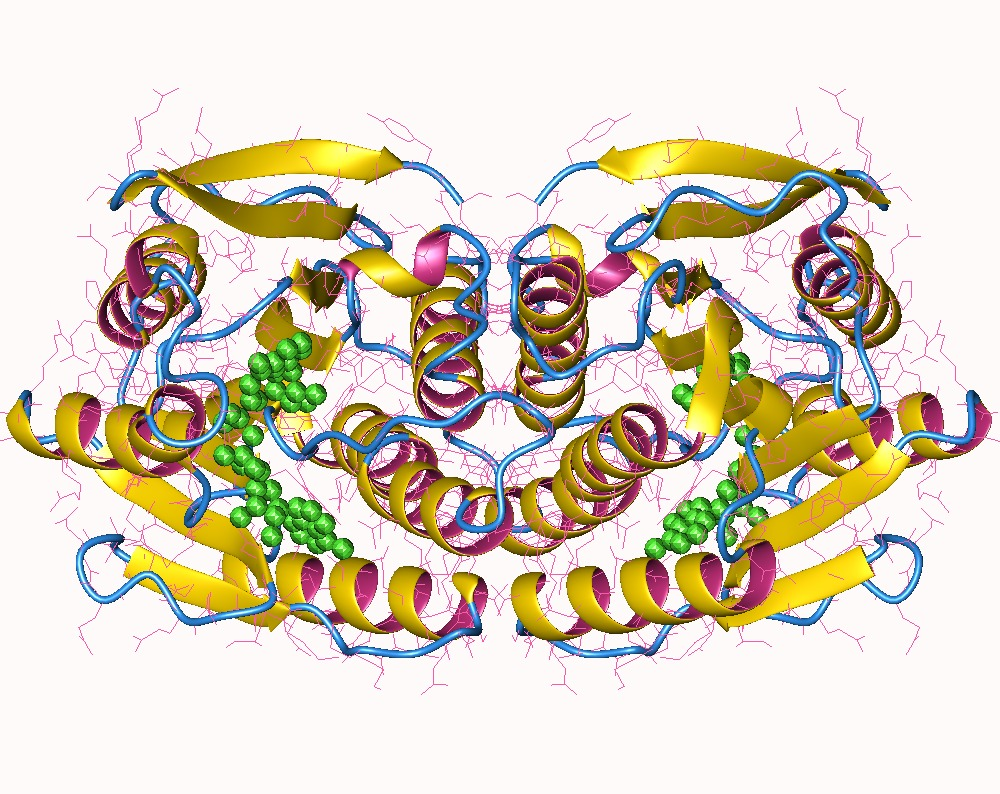
- Dihydropteridine reductase dimer, Human

Identifiers
- EC no.: 1.5.1.34
- CAS no.: 9074-11-7

Databases
- IntEnz: IntEnz view
- BRENDA: BRENDA entry
- ExPASy: NiceZyme view
- KEGG: KEGG entry
- MetaCyc: metabolic pathway
- PRIAM: profile
- PDB structures: RCSB PDB PDBe PDBsum
- Gene Ontology: AmiGO / QuickGO
Search
- PMC: articles
- PubMed: articles
- NCBI: proteins

6,7-dihydropteridine reductase (EC 1.5.1.34, also dihydrobiopterin reductase) is an enzyme that catalyzes the chemical reaction

dihydrobiopterin
+ 2 NADH
2 H^{+}
2 H^{+}
tetrahydrobiopterin
+ 2 NAD^{+}

The substrates of this enzyme are dihydrobiopterin (specifically the isomer (6R)-L-erythro-6,7-dihydrobiopterin), reduced nicotinamide adenine dinucleotide (NADH), and two protons. Its products are tetrahydropteridine and oxidised NAD^{+}. Nicotinamide adenine dinucleotide phosphate can be used as an alternative cofactor. The enzyme participates in folate biosynthesis. In the human genome, the enzyme is encoded by the QDPR gene.

== Nomenclature ==
This enzyme belongs to the family of oxidoreductases, specifically those acting on the CH-NH group of donors with NAD+ or NADP+ as acceptor. The systematic name of this enzyme class is 5,6,7,8-tetrahydropteridine:NAD(P)+ oxidoreductase. Other names in common use include 6,7-dihydropteridine:NAD(P)H oxidoreductase, DHPR, NAD(P)H:6,7-dihydropteridine oxidoreductase, NADH-dihydropteridine reductase, NADPH-dihydropteridine reductase, NADPH-specific dihydropteridine reductase, dihydropteridine (reduced nicotinamide adenine dinucleotide), reductase, dihydropteridine reductase, dihydropteridine reductase (NADH), and 5,6,7,8-tetrahydropteridine:NAD(P)H+ oxidoreductase.

L-erythro-7,8-dihydrobiopterin

The enzyme is believed to act on the so-called "quinonoid" form of the starting dihydrobiopterin. This is in contrast to the enzyme dihydrofolate reductase, which normally acts on dihydrofolic acid but can also reduce the isomer, L-erythro-7,8-dihydrobiopterin.

== Clinical significance ==
Dihydropteridine reductase deficiency is a defect in the regeneration of tetrahydrobiopterin. Many patients have significant developmental delays despite therapy, develop brain abnormalities, and are prone to sudden death. The reason is not completely clear, but might be related to the accumulation of dihydrobiopterin and abnormal metabolism of folic acid. Response to treatment is variable and the long-term and functional outcome is unknown. To provide a basis for improving the understanding of the epidemiology, genotype/phenotype correlation and outcome of these diseases their impact on the quality of life of patients, and for evaluating diagnostic and therapeutic strategies a patient registry was established by the noncommercial International Working Group on Neurotransmitter Related Disorders (iNTD). Dihydropteridine reductase deficiency is treated with tyrosine supplements, a controlled diet which is lacking in phenylalanine, well as supplementation of L-DOPA.

== See also ==
- Sepiapterin reductase
