= Dihydropteridine reductase deficiency =

Genetic metabolic disorder

Dihydropteridine reductase deficiency (DHPRD) is a genetic disorder affecting the tetrahydrobiopterin (BH4) synthesis pathway, inherited in the autosomal recessive pattern. It is one of the six known disorders causing tetrahydrobiopterin deficiency, and occurs in patients with mutations of the QDPR gene.

== Presentation ==
The disease presents with such symptoms as elevated levels of phenylalanine (hyperphenylalaninemia), microcephaly, hypotonus, intellectual disability and epileptic seizures.

== Diagnostics ==
Besides the traditional analysis of symptoms and investigation of phenylalanine concentrations, patients suspected for DHPRD undergo the assessment of enzymatic activity using the dried blood spot method - this permits to distinguish DHPR deficiency from the other forms of BH4 deficiency.

== Treatment ==
Patients are prescribed a phenylalanine-reduced diet, with regular monitoring of phenylalanine levels in the blood. Besides the diet, a patient may be prescribed sapropterin, a synthetic analogue of tetrahydrobiopterin.

In order to restore dopamine levels in the central nervous system, patients are given L-dopa in conjunction with an inhibitor of aromatic amino acid decarboxylase that acts outside the nervous system, so as to promote the transformation of L-dopa into dopamine inside the central nervous system, and thus to improve the efficiency of the treatment.

Since the insufficient levels of BH4 inhibit the transformation of tryptophan into 5-hydroxytryptophan in a reaction in which BH4 serves as a cofactor of the enzyme tryptophane hydroxylase 2, patients have a lack of serotonin in their CNS. In order to correct this deficiency, they are given 5-hydroxytryptophan.

In patients with DHPR deficiency, a pronounced lack of 5-methyltetrahydrofolate (5-MTHF) is observed in the central nervous system. This condition, termed cerebral folate deficiency, (CFD) is more severe in DHPRD patients than in patients with other forms of BH4 deficiency. CFD is corrected by treating patients with folinic acid, a form of folate that efficiently passes the hematoencephalic barrier. The use of folic acid, the synthetic form of folate employed in food fortification, should be avoided because folic acid tightly binds to the folate receptor alpha and may inhibit the transport of folate into the central nervous system.
