= S2242 =

Names
- IUPAC name 2-[(2-Aminopurin-7-yl)methoxy]propane-1,3-diol
- Other names 2-Amino-7-(1,3-dihydroxy-2-propoxymethyl)purine

Identifiers
3D model (JSmol)	Interactive image
ChemSpider	414654
PubChem CID	472169
CompTox Dashboard (EPA)	DTXSID901028117
- InChI: InChI=1S/C9H13N5O3/c10-9-11-1-7-8(13-9)12-4-14(7)5-17-6(2-15)3-16/h1,4,6,15-16H,2-3,5H2,(H2,10,11,13) Key: BSNKMHPUZGTSQB-UHFFFAOYSA-N; InChI=1/C9H13N5O3/c10-9-11-1-7-8(13-9)12-4-14(7)5-17-6(2-15)3-16/h1,4,6,15-16H,2-3,5H2,(H2,10,11,13) Key: BSNKMHPUZGTSQB-UHFFFAOYAS
- SMILES: C1=C2C(=NC(=N1)N)N=CN2COC(CO)CO

Properties
Chemical formula	C_{9}H_{13}N_{5}O_{3}
Molar mass	239.235 g·mol^{−1}
- Except where otherwise noted, data are given for materials in their standard state (at 25 °C [77 °F], 100 kPa). Infobox references

S2242 is an experimental antiviral agent that is an inhibitor of herpes virus replication.
