= Mixed-function oxidase =

Mixed-function oxidase refers to a family of oxidase enzymes that catalyze the splitting of oxygen (O_{2}) into water and an O atom, which attaches to substrate. A major example is cytochrome P450, a large family of enzymes. The term "mixed function oxidase" is seldom used among enzymologists.

Oxidase is a general name for enzymes that catalyze oxidations in which molecular oxygen (O_{2}) is the electron acceptor but oxygen atoms do not appear in the oxidized product. Often, oxygen is reduced to either water (cytochrome oxidase of the mitochondrial electron transfer chain) or hydrogen peroxide (dehydrogenation of fatty acyl-CoA in peroxisomes). Most of the oxidases are flavoproteins. By contrast, "mixed-function oxidase" behaves only partially as an oxidase (producing water from O_{2}) but partially for some other process such as hydroxylation or desaturation of fatty acyl-CoA in vertebrates is an example of the mixed-function oxidase reaction. In the process, saturated fatty acyl-CoA and NADPH are oxidized by molecular oxygen (O_{2}) to produce monounsaturated fatty acyl-CoA, NADP^{+} and 2 molecules of water.

== Reaction ==
Simplified cycle for hydroxylation by an iron-based mixed-function oxidase. In this scheme, L represents the ligand(s) that bind to the Fe and RH represents the substrate that is hydroxylated.

The mixed-function oxidases operate by this stoichiometry:

AH + BH_{2} + O_{2} → AOH + B + H_{2}O, where BH_{2} is a reductant, and AH is a substrate

== Medical significance ==
Mixed-function oxidases are important in metabolism of drugs and other "xenobiotic" compounds: "Mixed function oxidases catalyze the oxidation of an extremely diverse array of lipophilic drug substrates as well as endobiotics such as steroid and thyroid hormones, fatty acids, and arachidonic acid metabolites. Because they introduce the hydrophilic hydroxy group, these oxidases convert lipophilic compounds to those that are more readily secreted or are often more available for further biodegradation.

High levels of mixed-function oxidase activity have been studied for their activation effects in human colon carcinoma cell lines, to study the susceptibility to certain cancers. The research has been successful in mice but remains inconclusive in humans.
