= Hyperphenylalaninemia =

- Hyperphenylalaninemia can be inherited in an autosomal recessive manner.
- Specialty: Endocrinology
- Differential diagnosis: Phenylketonuria (PKU), BH4 Deficiency (Tetrahydrobiopterin Deficiency), Tyrosinemia.
- Frequency: 15–75 per 1,000,000 births.

Hyperphenylalaninemia is a medical condition characterized by mildly or strongly elevated concentrations of the amino acid phenylalanine in the blood. Phenylketonuria (PKU) can result in severe hyperphenylalaninemia. Phenylalanine concentrations are routinely screened in newborns by the neonatal heel prick (Guthrie test), which takes a few drops of blood from the heel of the infant. Standard phenylalanine concentrations in unaffected persons are about 2-6mg/dl (120–360 μmol/L) phenylalanine concentrations in those with untreated hyperphenylalaninemia can be up to 20 mg/dL (1200 μmol/L). Measurable IQ deficits are often detected as phenylalanine levels approach 10 mg/dL (600 mol/L). Phenylketonuria (PKU)-like symptoms, including more pronounced developmental defects, skin irritation, and vomiting, may appear when phenylalanine levels are near 20 mg/dL (1200 mol/L).Hyperphenylalaninemia is a recessive hereditary metabolic disorder that is caused by the body's failure to convert phenylalanine to tyrosine as a result of the entire or partial absence of the enzyme phenylalanine hydroxylase.

== Symptoms and signs ==
The coloration of the skin, hair, and eyes is different in children with PKU. This is caused by low levels of tyrosine, whose metabolic pathway is blocked by deficiency of PAH. Another skin alteration that might occur is the presence of irritation or dermatitis. The child's behaviour may be influenced as well due to augmented levels of phenethylamine which in turn affects levels of other amines in the brain. Psychomotor function may be affected and observed to worsen progressively.

== Cause ==
People with the genotype for PKU are unaffected in utero, because maternal circulation prevents buildup of [phe]. After birth, PKU in newborns is treated by a special diet with highly restricted phenylalanine content. Persons with genetic predisposition to PKU have normal mental development on this diet. Previously, it was thought safe to withdraw from the diet in the late teens or early twenties, after the central nervous system was fully developed; recent studies suggest some degree of relapse, and a continued phenylalanine-restricted diet is now recommended.

PKU or hyperphenylalaninemia may also occur in persons without the PKU genotype. If the mother has the PKU genotype but has been treated so as to be asymptomatic, high levels of [phe] in the maternal blood circulation may affect the non-PKU fetus during gestation. Mothers successfully treated for PKU are advised to return to the [phe]-restricted diet during pregnancy.

A small subset of patients with hyperphenylalaninemia shows an appropriate reduction in plasma phenylalanine levels with dietary restriction of this amino acid; however, these patients still develop progressive neurologic symptoms and seizures and usually die within the first 2 years of life ("malignant" hyperphenylalaninemia). These infants exhibit normal phenylalanine hydroxylase (PAH) enzymatic activity but have a deficiency in dihydropteridine reductase (DHPR), an enzyme required for the regeneration of tetrahydrobiopterin (THB or BH_{4}), a cofactor of PAH.

Less frequently, DHPR activity is normal but a defect in the biosynthesis of THB exists. In either case, dietary therapy corrects the hyperphenylalaninemia. However, THB is also a cofactor for two other hydroxylation reactions required in the syntheses of neurotransmitters in the brain: the hydroxylation of tryptophan to 5-hydroxytryptophan and of tyrosine to L-dopa. It has been suggested that the resulting deficit in the CNS neurotransmitter activity is, at least in part, responsible for the neurologic manifestations and eventual death of these patients. Hyperphenylalaninemia most is commonly diagnosed by newborn screening and must be distinguished from classic PKU by confirmatory testing at an experienced center. Some cases in adult women have been detected using maternal screening programs or following birth of children with birth defects. Elevated phenylalanine levels are associated with neuropsychological effects.

== Diagnosis ==
Screening is done using tandem mass spectroscopy. Confirmation is done by checking for elevated Phe concentration (> 120 μmol/L) and increased Phe/tyrosine ratio (> 3 if tandem mass spectrometry is used) in a blood sample.

== Treatment ==
Maintain plasma phenylalanine values in therapeutic range of 120 to 360 mM using a diet that restricts phenylalanine but otherwise nutritionally complete. Treatment for life is recommended to reduce the risk of long term neuropsychiatric problems and reduce the risk of maternal PKU syndrome.

== Outcome ==
With treatment the outcome is excellent. Most infants with classic PKU who are treated within the first 10 days of life achieve normal intelligence. However learning problems are more frequent than in unaffected peers.

== See also ==
- Mild non-BH4-deficient hyperphenylalaninemia – rare disorder discovered in 2017
