= Biopterin-dependent aromatic amino acid hydroxylase =

Biopterin_H
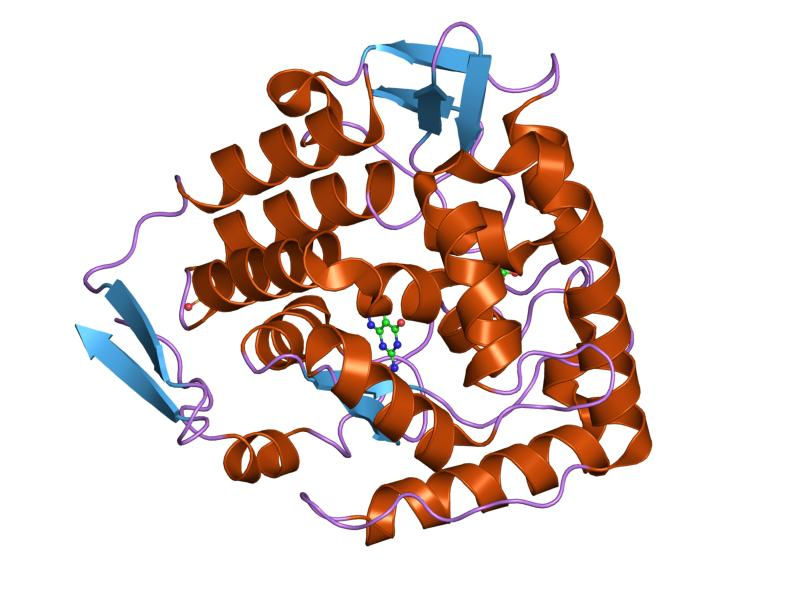
- crystal structure of ternary complex of the catalytic domain of human phenylalanine hydroxylase (Fe(II)) complexed with tetrahydrobiopterin and norleucine

Identifiers
- Symbol: Biopterin_H
- Pfam: PF00351
- InterPro: IPR019774
- PROSITE: PDOC00316
- SCOP2: 1toh / SCOPe / SUPFAM
- CDD: cd00361
Available protein structures:
- PDB: IPR019774 PF00351 (ECOD; PDBsum)
- AlphaFold: IPR019774; PF00351

Biopterin-dependent aromatic amino acid hydroxylases (AAAH) are a family of aromatic amino acid hydroxylase enzymes which includes phenylalanine 4-hydroxylase (EC 1.14.16.1), tyrosine 3-hydroxylase (EC 1.14.16.2), and tryptophan 5-hydroxylase (EC 1.14.16.4). These enzymes primarily hydroxylate the amino acids L-phenylalanine, L-tyrosine, and L-tryptophan, respectively.

The AAAH enzymes are functionally and structurally related proteins which act as rate-limiting catalysts for important metabolic pathways. Each AAAH enzyme contains iron and catalyzes the ring hydroxylation of aromatic amino acids using tetrahydrobiopterin (BH4) as a substrate. The AAAH enzymes are regulated by phosphorylation at serines in their N-termini.

== Role in metabolism ==
In humans, phenylalanine hydroxylase deficiency can cause phenylketonuria, the most common inborn error of amino acid metabolism. Phenylalanine hydroxylase catalyzes the conversion of L-phenylalanine to L-tyrosine. Tyrosine hydroxylase catalyzes the rate-limiting step in catecholamine biosynthesis: the conversion of L-tyrosine to L-DOPA. Similarly, tryptophan hydroxylase catalyzes the rate-limiting step in serotonin biosynthesis: the conversion of L-tryptophan to 5-hydroxy-L-tryptophan.

Biosynthetic pathways for catecholamines and trace amines in the human brain
In humans, catecholamines and phenethylaminergic trace amines are derived from the amino acid L-phenylalanine.

== Structure ==
It has been suggested that the AAAH enzymes each contain a conserved C-terminal catalytic (C) domain and an unrelated N-terminal regulatory (R) domain. It is possible that the R protein domains arose from genes that were recruited from different sources to combine with the common gene for the catalytic core. Thus, by combining with the same C domain, the proteins acquired the unique regulatory properties of the separate R domains.
