= Neopterin =

Names
- Preferred IUPAC name 2-Amino-6-(1,2,3-trihydroxypropyl)pteridin-4(1H)-one

Identifiers
CAS Number	2009-64-5
3D model (JSmol)	Interactive image; Interactive image
ChemSpider	395518
DrugBank	DB02385
ECHA InfoCard	100.016.296
MeSH	Neopterin
PubChem CID	448839
UNII	9PLD60N7SO
CompTox Dashboard (EPA)	DTXSID90862811
- InChI: InChI=1S/C9H11N5O4/c10-9-13-7-5(8(18)14-9)12-3(1-11-7)6(17)4(16)2-15/h1,4,6,15-17H,2H2,(H3,10,11,13,14,18)/t4-,6+/m1/s1 Key: BMQYVXCPAOLZOK-XINAWCOVSA-N
- SMILES: O=C2\N=C(/Nc1ncc(nc12)[C@H](O)[C@H](O)CO)N; C1=C(N=C2C(=N1)NC(=NC2=O)N)C(C(CO)O)O

Properties
Chemical formula	C_{9}H_{11}N_{5}O_{4}
Molar mass	253.215 g/mol
Density	2.02 g/cm^{3}
- Except where otherwise noted, data are given for materials in their standard state (at 25 °C [77 °F], 100 kPa). verify (what is ?) Infobox references

Neopterin is an organic compound belonging to the pteridine class of heterocyclic compounds.

Neopterin belongs to the chemical group known as pteridines. It is synthesised by human macrophages upon stimulation with the cytokine interferon-gamma and is indicative of a pro-inflammatory immune status. Neopterin serves as a marker of cellular immune system activation. In humans neopterin follows a circadian (daily) and circaseptan (weekly) rhythm.

== Biosynthesis ==
The biosynthesis of neopterin occurs in two steps from guanosine triphosphate (GTP). The first being catalyzed by GTP cyclohydrolase, which opens the ribose group. Phosphatases next catalyze the hydrolysis of the phosphate ester group.

== Neopterin as disease marker ==
Measurement of neopterin concentrations in body fluids like blood serum, cerebrospinal fluid or urine provides information about activation of cellular immune activation in humans under the control of T helper cells type 1. High neopterin production is associated with increased production of reactive oxygen species, neopterin concentrations also allow to estimate the extent of oxidative stress elicited by the immune system.

Increased neopterin production is found in, but not limited to, the following diseases:

- Viral infections including human immunodeficiency virus (HIV), hepatitis B and hepatitis C, SARS-CoV-1, SARS-CoV-2.
- Bacterial infections by intracellular living bacteria such as Borrelia (Lyme disease), Mycobacterium tuberculosis, and Helicobacter pylori.
- parasites such as Plasmodium (malaria)
- Autoimmune diseases such as rheumatoid arthritis (RA) and systemic lupus erythematosus (SLE)
- Malignant tumor diseases
- Allograft rejection episodes.
- A leukodystrophy called Aicardi-Goutieres syndrome
- Depression and somatization.

Neopterin concentrations usually correlate with the extent and activity of the disease, and are also useful to monitor during therapy in these patients. Elevated neopterin concentrations are among the best predictors of adverse outcome in patients with HIV infection, in cardiovascular disease and in various types of cancer.

In the laboratory it is measured by radioimmunoassay (RIA), ELISA, or high-performance liquid chromatography (HPLC). It has a native fluorescence of wavelength excitation at 353 nm and emission at 438 nm, rendering it readily detected.
