= Pteridine =

Aromatic compound made of fused pyrimidine and pyrazine rings

- Skeletal formula of pteridine

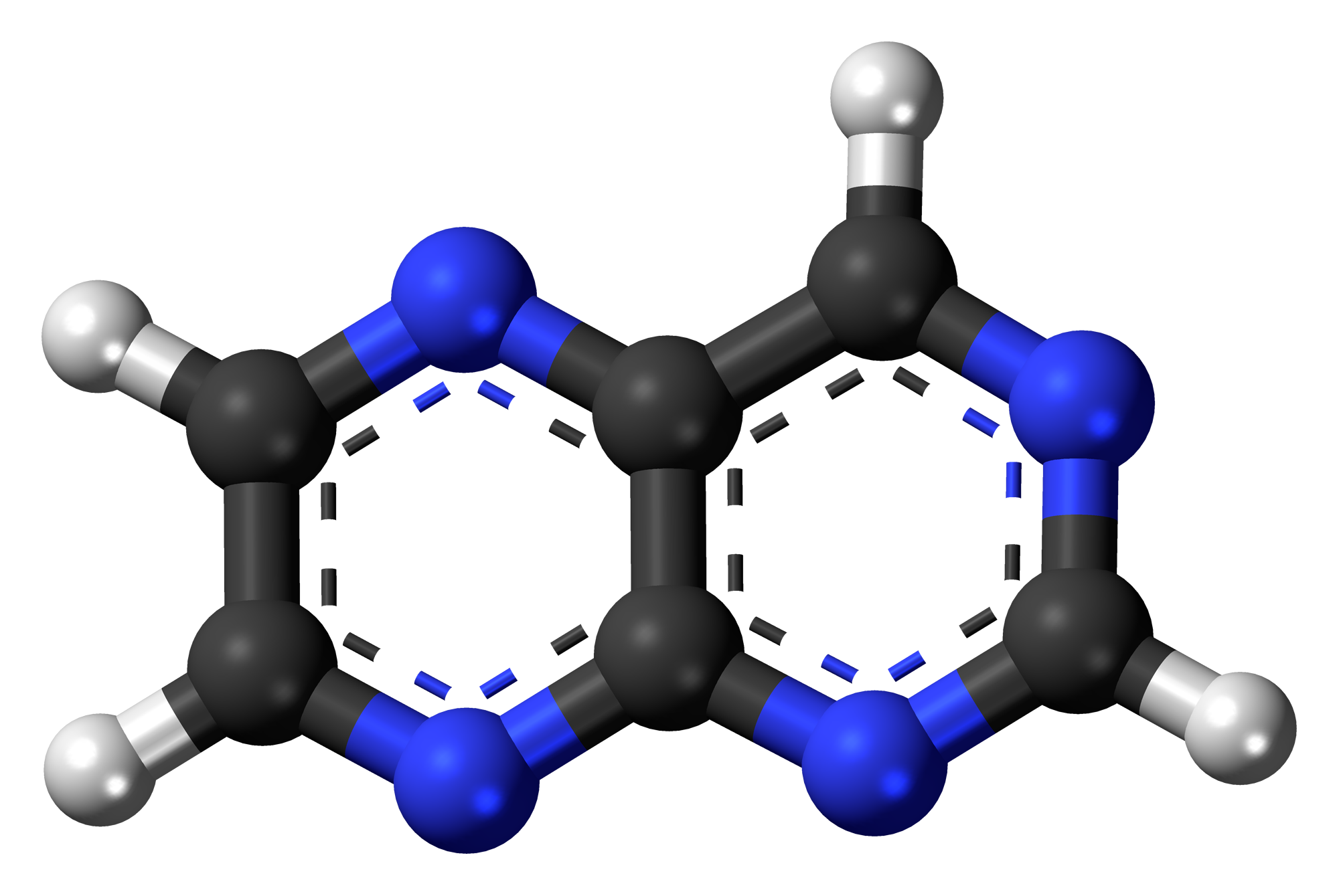
C=black, H=white, N=blue
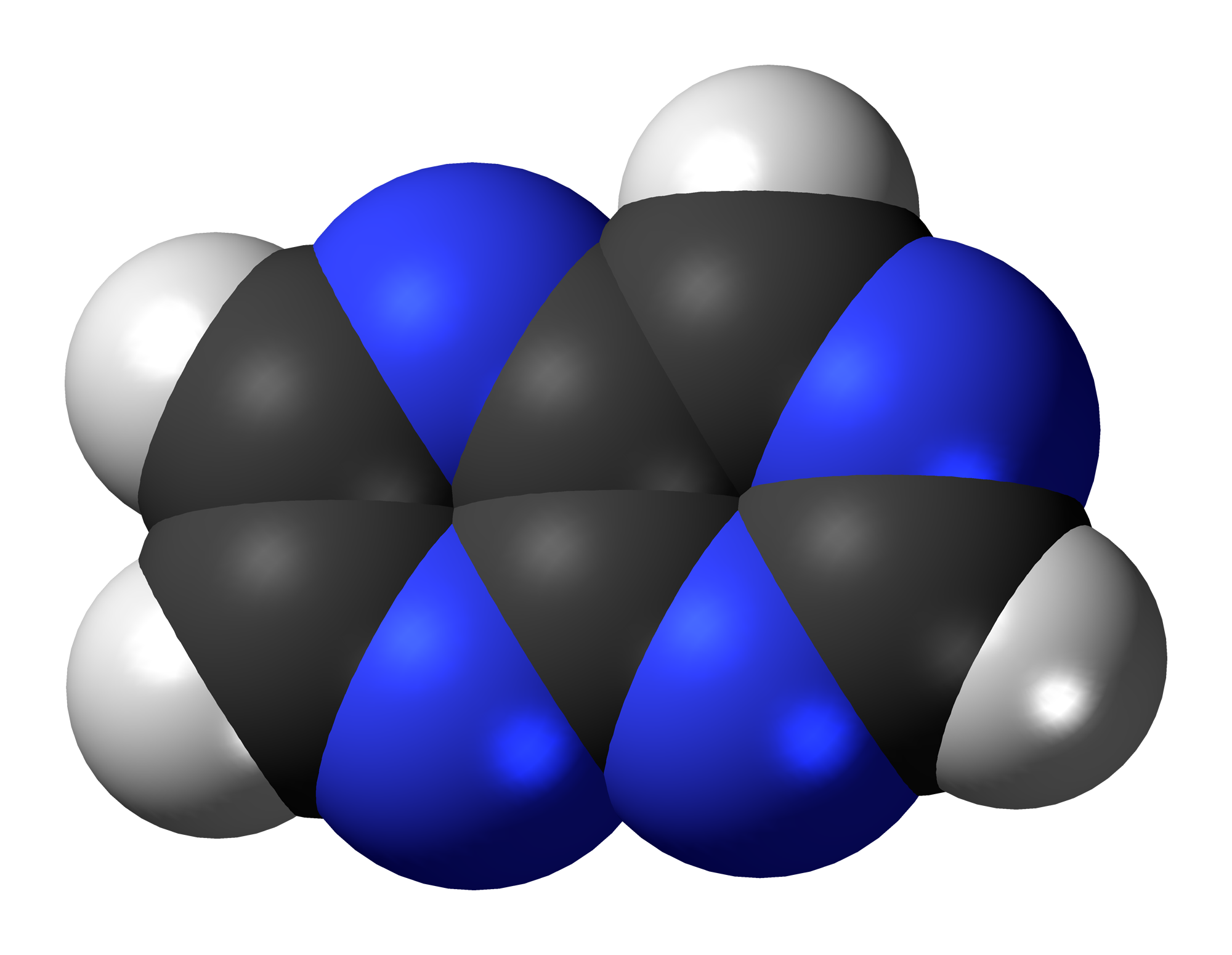
C=black, H=white, N=blue

Names
- Preferred IUPAC name Pteridine

Identifiers
| CAS Number | 91-18-9 |
| 3D model (JSmol) | Interactive image |
| ChEBI | CHEBI:27601 |
| ChemSpider | 1014 |
| KEGG | C07581 |
| PubChem CID | 1043 |
| UNII | 6EZF26XQ81 |
| CompTox Dashboard (EPA) | DTXSID60238347 |
- InChI: InChI=1S/C6H4N4/c1-2-9-6-5(8-1)3-7-4-10-6/h1-4H Key: CPNGPNLZQNNVQM-UHFFFAOYSA-N; InChI=1/C6H4N4/c1-2-9-6-5(8-1)3-7-4-10-6/h1-4H Key: CPNGPNLZQNNVQM-UHFFFAOYAU
- SMILES: C1=CN=C2C(=N1)C=NC=N2

Properties
| Chemical formula | C_{6}H_{4}N_{4} |
| Molar mass | 132.126 g·mol^{−1} |
| Melting point | 139.5 °C (283.1 °F; 412.6 K) |
- Except where otherwise noted, data are given for materials in their standard state (at 25 °C [77 °F], 100 kPa). verify (what is ?) Infobox references

A pteridine is a bicyclic heterocyclic system with two nitrogen atoms at positions 1 and 4 in ring A, and two nitrogen atoms at positions 1 and 3 in ring B. Pteridines constitute a large group of heterocyclic compounds containing a wide variety of substituents on this parent structure. Pterins and flavins are classes of substituted pteridines that have diverse biological roles.

Synthesis of pteridine from 4,5-diaminopyrimidine and glyoxal

== See also ==
- Dihydrobiopterin
- Pyrazine
- Pyrimidine
- Tetrahydrobiopterin
