= Phenylalanine hydroxylase =

Mammalian protein found in Homo sapiens

PAH
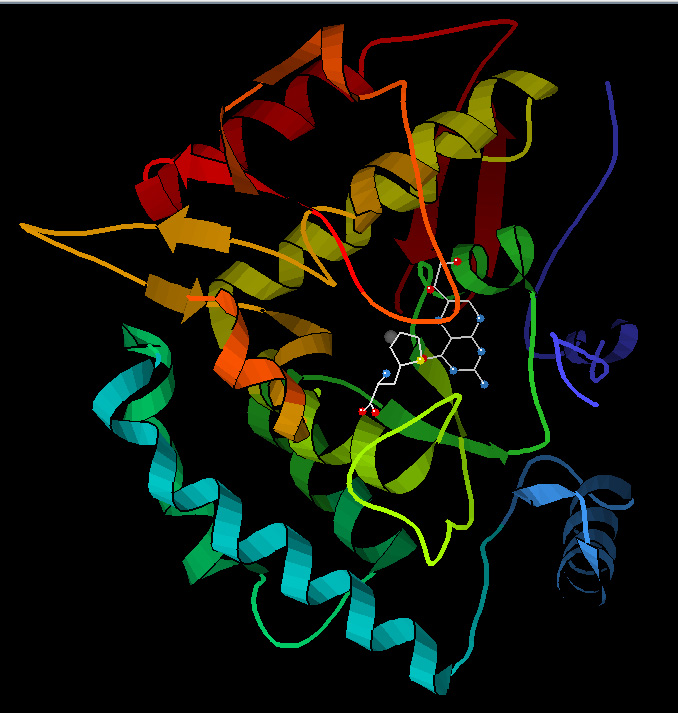

Identifiers
- Aliases: PAH, PH, PKU, PKU1, phenylalanine hydroxylase
- External IDs: OMIM: 612349; MGI: 97473; GeneCards: PAH
Available structures
PDB	Ortholog search: PDBe RCSB
PDB	List of PDB id codes 1DMW, 1J8T, 1J8U, 1KW0, 1LRM, 1MMK, 1MMT, 1TDW, 1TG2, 2PAH, 3PAH, 4ANP, 5PAH, 6PAH, 5FII
Enzyme activity
EC #	BRENDA	ExPASy	KEGG	MetaCyc
1.14.16.1	↗	↗	↗	↗

Gene location (Human)
Chr.	Chromosome 12 (human)
Band	12q23.2	Start	102,836,889 bp
Band	12q23.2	End	102,958,410 bp

Gene location (Mouse)
Chr.	Chromosome 10 (mouse)
Band	10 C1|10 43.64 cM	Start	87,357,657 bp
Band	10 C1|10 43.64 cM	End	87,419,998 bp
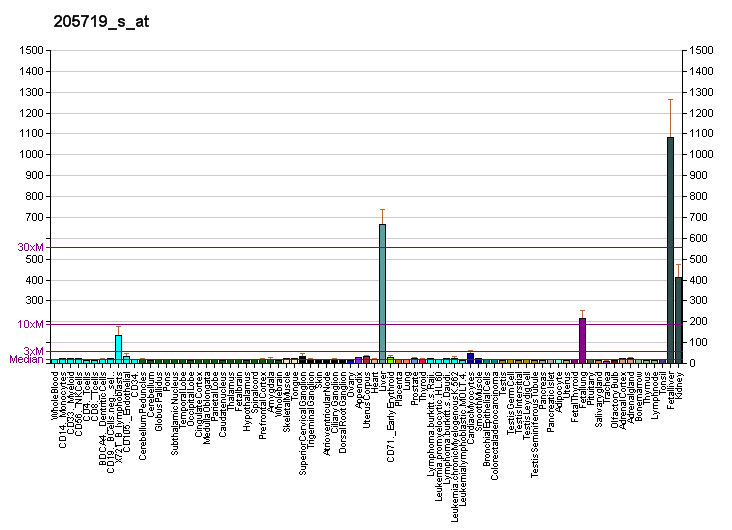

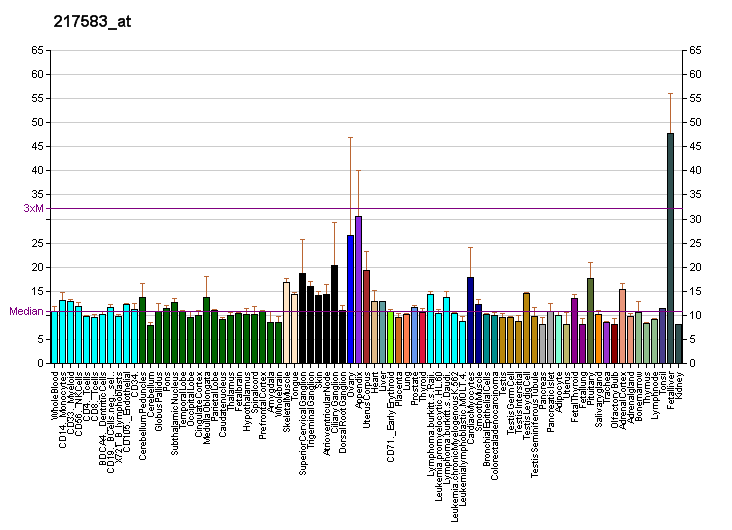
RNA expression pattern
Bgee	Human / Mouse (ortholog); Top expressed in: right lobe of liver; gallbladder; kidney tubule; glomerulus; metanephric glomerulus; body of pancreas; renal medulla; human kidney; testicle; sperm / Top expressed in: left lobe of liver; human kidney; right kidney; gallbladder; proximal tubule; pyloric antrum; human fetus; fetal liver hematopoietic progenitor cell; pancreas; sexually immature organism; More reference expression data
BioGPS	More reference expression data
Gene ontology
Molecular function	iron ion binding; phenylalanine 4-monooxygenase activity; metal ion binding; monooxygenase activity; catalytic activity; oxidoreductase activity, acting on paired donors, with incorporation or reduction of molecular oxygen, reduced pteridine as one donor, and incorporation of one atom of oxygen; oxidoreductase activity
Cellular component	cytosol
Biological process	catecholamine biosynthetic process; neurotransmitter biosynthetic process; L-phenylalanine catabolic process; cellular amino acid biosynthetic process; aromatic amino acid family metabolic process; metabolism; tyrosine biosynthetic process
Sources:Amigo / QuickGO
Orthologs
Databases	NCBI: entry; OMA: entry
Species	Human	Mouse
Entrez	5053	18478
Ensembl	ENSG00000171759	ENSMUSG00000020051
UniProt	P00439	P16331
RefSeq (mRNA)	NM_000277; NM_001354304	NM_008777
RefSeq (protein)	NP_000268; NP_001341233	NP_032803
Location (UCSC)	Chr 12: 102.84 – 102.96 Mb	Chr 10: 87.36 – 87.42 Mb
PubMed search
- Wikidata
View/Edit Human	View/Edit Mouse

Phenylalanine hydroxylase (PAH) (EC 1.14.16.1) is an enzyme that catalyzes the hydroxylation of the aromatic side-chain of phenylalanine to generate tyrosine. PAH is one of three members of the biopterin-dependent aromatic amino acid hydroxylases, a class of monooxygenase that uses tetrahydrobiopterin (BH_{4}, a pteridine cofactor) and a non-heme iron for catalysis. During the reaction, molecular oxygen is heterolytically cleaved with sequential incorporation of one oxygen atom into BH_{4} and phenylalanine substrate. In humans, mutations in its encoding gene, PAH, can lead to the metabolic disorder phenylketonuria.

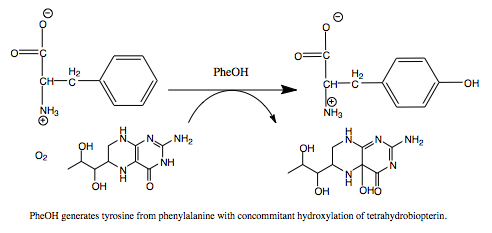
Reaction catalyzed by PAH

== Enzyme mechanism ==
The reaction is thought to proceed through the following steps:

1. formation of a Fe(II)-O-O-BH_{4} bridge.
2. heterolytic cleavage of the O-O bond to yield the ferryl oxo hydroxylating intermediate Fe(IV)=O
3. attack on Fe(IV)=O to hydroxylate phenylalanine substrate to tyrosine.

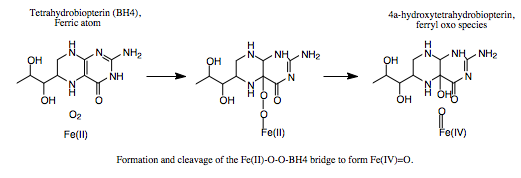
PAH mechanism, part I

Formation and cleavage of the iron-peroxypterin bridge. Although evidence strongly supports Fe(IV)=O as the hydroxylating intermediate, the mechanistic details underlying the formation of the Fe(II)-O-O-BH_{4} bridge prior to heterolytic cleavage remain controversial. Two pathways have been proposed based on models that differ in the proximity of the iron to the pterin cofactor and the number of water molecules assumed to be iron-coordinated during catalysis. According to one model, an iron dioxygen complex is initially formed and stabilized as a resonance hybrid of Fe^{2+}O_{2} and Fe^{3+}O_{2}^{−}. The activated O_{2} then attacks BH_{4}, forming a transition state characterized by charge separation between the electron-deficient pterin ring and the electron-rich dioxygen species. The Fe(II)-O-O-BH_{4} bridge is subsequently formed. On the other hand, formation of this bridge has been modeled assuming that BH4 is located in iron's first coordination shell and that the iron is not coordinated to any water molecules. This model predicts a different mechanism involving a pterin radical and superoxide as critical intermediates. Once formed, the Fe(II)-O-O-BH_{4} bridge is broken through heterolytic cleavage of the O-O bond to Fe(IV)=O and 4a-hydroxytetrahydrobiopterin; thus, molecular oxygen is the source of both oxygen atoms used to hydroxylate the pterin ring and phenylalanine.

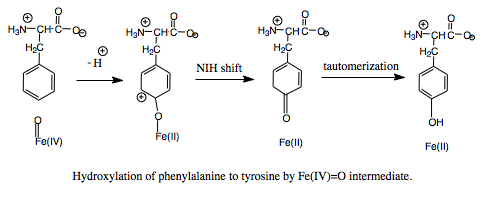
PAH mechanism, part II

Hydroxylation of phenylalanine by ferryl oxo intermediate. Because the mechanism involves a Fe(IV)=O (as opposed to a peroxypterin) hydroxylating intermediate, oxidation of the BH_{4} cofactor and hydroxylation of phenylalanine can be decoupled, resulting in unproductive consumption of BH_{4} and formation of H_{2}O_{2}. When productive, though, the Fe(IV)=O intermediate is added to phenylalanine in an electrophilic aromatic substitution reaction that reduces iron from the ferryl to the ferrous state. Although initially an arene oxide or radical intermediate was proposed, analyses of the related tryptophan and tyrosine hydroxylases have suggested that the reaction instead proceeds through a cationic intermediate that requires Fe(IV)=O to be coordinated to a water ligand rather than a hydroxo group. This cationic intermediate subsequently undergoes a 1,2-hydride NIH shift, yielding a dienone intermediate that then tautomerizes to form the tyrosine product. The pterin cofactor is regenerated by hydration of the carbinolamine product of PAH to quinonoid dihydrobiopterin (qBH_{2}), which is then reduced to BH_{4}.

== Enzyme regulation ==
PAH is proposed to use the morpheein model of allosteric regulation.

Mammalian PAH exists in an equilibrium consisting of tetramers of two distinct architectures, with one or more dimeric forms as part of the equilibrium. This behavior is consistent with a dissociative allosteric mechanism.

Many studies suggest that mammalian PAH shows behavior comparable to porphobilinogen synthase (PBGS), wherein a variety of factors such as pH and ligand binding are reported to affect enzyme activity and protein stability.

== Structure ==
The PAH monomer (51.9 kDa) consists of three distinct domains: a regulatory N-terminal domain (residues 1–117) that contains a Phe-binding ACT subdomain, the catalytic domain (residues 118–427), and a C-terminal domain (residues 428–453) responsible for oligomerization of identical monomers. Extensive crystallographic analysis has been performed, especially on the pterin- and iron-coordinated catalytic domain to examine the active site. The structure of the N-terminal regulatory domain has also been determined, and together with the solved structure of the homologous tyrosine hydroxylase C-terminal tetramerization domain, a structural model of tetrameric PAH was proposed. Using X-ray crystallography, the structure of full-length rat PAH was determined experimentally and showed the auto-inhibited, or resting-state form of the enzyme. The resting-state form (RS-PAH) is architecturally distinct from the activated form (A-PAH). A full-length structure of A-PAH is currently lacking, but the Phe stabilized ACT-ACT interface that is characteristic of A-PAH has been determined and a structural model of A-PAH based on SAXS analysis has been proposed.

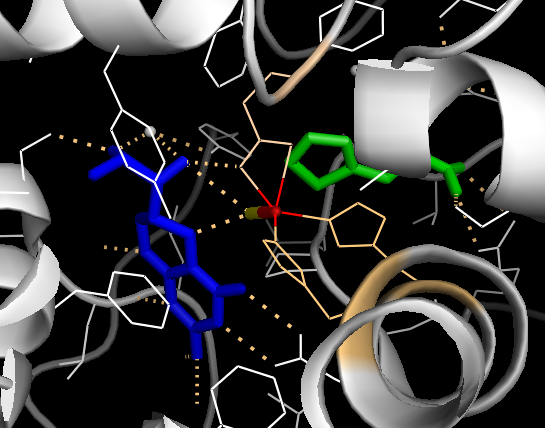
Model of the active site of PAH bound to BH4, ferrous, and a phenylalanine analogue. (from PDB 1KW0) Phenylalanine analogue, BH4, iron, Fe(II)-coordinated His and Glu residues

=== Catalytic domain ===
Solved crystal structures of the catalytic domain indicate that the active site consists of an open and spacious pocket lined primarily by hydrophobic residues, though three glutamic acid residues, two histidines, and a tyrosine are also present and iron-binding. Contradictory evidence exists about the coordination state of the ferrous atom and its proximity to BH4 within the active site. According to crystallographic analysis, Fe(II) is coordinated by water, His285, His290, and Glu330 (a 2-his-1-carboxylate facial triad arrangement) with octahedral geometry. Inclusion of a Phe analogue in the crystal structure changes both iron from a six- to a five-coordinated state involving a single water molecule and bidentate coordination to Glu330 and opening a site for oxygen to bind. BH4 is concomitantly shifted toward the iron atom, although the pterin cofactor remains in the second coordination sphere. On the other hand, a competing model based on NMR and molecular modeling analyses suggests that all coordinated water molecules are forced out of the active site during the catalytic cycle while BH4 becomes directly coordinated to iron. As discussed above, resolving this discrepancy will be important for determining the exact mechanism of PAH catalysis.

=== N-terminal regulatory domain ===
The regulatory nature of the N-terminal domain (residues 1–117) is conferred by its structural flexibility. Hydrogen/deuterium exchanges analysis indicates that allosteric binding of Phe globally alters the conformation of PAH such that the active site is less occluded as the interface between the regulatory and catalytic domains is increasingly exposed to solvent. This observation is consistent with kinetic studies, which show an initially low rate of tyrosine formation for full-length PAH. This lag time is not observed, however, for a truncated PAH lacking the N-terminal domain or if the full-length enzyme is pre-incubated with Phe. Deletion of the N-terminal domain also eliminates the lag time while increasing the affinity for Phe by nearly two-fold; no difference is observed in the V_{max} or K_{m} for the tetrahydrobiopterin cofactor. Additional regulation is provided by Ser16; phosphorylation of this residue does not alter enzyme conformation but does reduce the concentration of Phe required for allosteric activation. This N-terminal regulatory domain is not observed in bacterial PAHs but shows considerable structural homology to the regulatory domain of phosphogylcerate dehydrogenase, an enzyme in the serine biosynthetic pathway.

=== Tetramerization domain ===
Prokaryotic PAH is monomeric, whereas eukaryotic PAH exists in an equilibrium between homotetrameric and homodimeric forms. The dimerization interface is composed of symmetry-related loops that link identical monomers, while the overlapping C-terminal tetramerization domain mediates the association of conformationally distinct dimers that are characterized by a different relative orientation of the catalytic and tetramerization domains (Flatmark, Erlandsen). The resulting distortion of the tetramer symmetry is evident in the differential surface area of the dimerization interfaces and distinguishes PAH from the tetramerically symmetrical tyrosine hydroxylase. A domain-swapping mechanism has been proposed to mediate formation of the tetramer from dimers, in which C-terminal alpha-helixes mutually alter their conformation around a flexible C-terminal five-residue hinge region to form a coiled-coil structure, shifting equilibrium toward the tetrameric form. Although both the homodimeric and homotetrameric forms of PAH are catalytically active, the two exhibit differential kinetics and regulation. In addition to reduced catalytic efficiency, the dimer does not display positive cooperativity toward L-Phe (which at high concentrations activates the enzyme), suggesting that L-Phe allosterically regulates PAH by influencing dimer-dimer interaction.

== Biological function ==
PAH is a critical enzyme in phenylalanine metabolism and catalyzes the rate-limiting step in its complete catabolism to carbon dioxide and water. Regulation of flux through phenylalanine-associated pathways is critical in mammalian metabolism, as evidenced by the toxicity of high plasma levels of this amino acid observed in phenylketonuria (see below). The principal source of phenylalanine is ingested proteins, but relatively little of this pool is used for protein synthesis. Instead, the majority of ingested phenylalanine is catabolized through PAH to form tyrosine; addition of the hydroxyl group allows for the benzene ring to be broken in subsequent catabolic steps. Transamination to phenylpyruvate, whose metabolites are excreted in the urine, represents another pathway of phenylalanine turnover, but catabolism through PAH predominates.

In humans, this enzyme is expressed both in the liver and the kidney, and there is some indication that it may be differentially regulated in these tissues. PAH is unusual among the aromatic amino acid hydroxylases for its involvement in catabolism; tyrosine and tryptophan hydroxylases, on the other hand, are primarily expressed in the central nervous system and catalyze rate-limiting steps in neurotransmitter/hormone biosynthesis.

== Disease relevance ==
Deficiency in PAH activity due to mutations in PAH causes hyperphenylalaninemia (HPA), and when blood phenylalanine levels increase above 20 times the normal concentration, the metabolic disease phenylketonuria (PKU) results. PKU is both genotypically and phenotypically heterogeneous: Over 300 distinct pathogenic variants have been identified, the majority of which correspond to missense mutations that map to the catalytic domain. When a cohort of identified PAH mutants were expressed in recombinant systems, the enzymes displayed altered kinetic behavior and/or reduced stability, consistent with structural mapping of these mutations to both the catalytic and tetramerization domains of the enzyme. BH4_{4} has been administered as a pharmacological treatment and has been shown to reduce blood levels of phenylalanine for a segment of PKU patients whose genotypes lead to some residual PAH activity but have no defect in BH4_{4} synthesis or regeneration. Follow-up studies suggest that in the case of certain PAH mutants, excess BH4_{4} acts as a pharmacological chaperone to stabilize mutant enzymes with disrupted tetramer assembly and increased sensitivity to proteolytic cleavage and aggregation. Mutations that have been identified in the PAH locus are documented at the Phenylalanine Hydroxylase Locus Knowledgbase (PAHdb, https://web.archive.org/web/20130718162051/http://www.pahdb.mcgill.ca/).

Since phenylketonuria can cause irreversible damage, it is imperative that deficiencies in the phenylalanine hydroxylase are determined early on in development. Originally, this was done using a bacterial inhibition assay known as the Guthrie Test. Now, PKU is part of newborn screening in many countries, and elevated phenylalanine levels are identified shortly after birth by measurement with tandem mass spectrometry. Placing the individual on a low phenylalanine, high tyrosine diet can help prevent any long-term damage to their development.

== PAH Knock-out Model ==
The first attempt at creating a Pah-KO mouse model was reported in a research article published in 2021. This knockout mouse was created to be homozygous through its development within the C57BL/6 J strain using CRISPR/Cas9. Codon 7, GAG, in the Pah gene was altered to the stop codon TAG, depicting an intentional point mutation. Two to six-month-old, male, homozygous mice were studied by scientific methods such as behavioral and biochemical assays, MRI, and histopathology. The homozygous mice were routinely compared to control mice, age and sex-matched heterozygous Pah-KO mice that expressed sufficient PAH enzyme activity to supply phenylalanine and tyrosine levels similar to wild type mice.

The Pah-KO mouse model presented high blood phenylalanine and low tyrosine levels, hypocholesterolemia, high phenylalanine and low levels of neurotransmitters and tyrosine in the brain, hypomyelination, low brain and body weight, high grade of ocular pathology, hypopigmentation, and a progressive behavioral deficit compared to heterozygous mice. After termination of the homozygous mice, no hepatic PAH proteins were detected by western blot analysis. The increased amount of phenylalanine in whole brain homogenates of homozygous mice was similar to PKU patients. The hair coat color of both mice was dependent on the amount of melanin pigment in hair shafts; thus, homozygous mice were prone to be a lighter brown based on less melanin present. Mice behavior was tested with a nesting building assay.

This model sets up the potential for an extensive investigation of PKU biology resembling PKU patients and for the evaluation of modern therapeutic strategies for PKU treatment.

== Related enzymes ==
Phenylalanine hydroxylase is closely related to two other enzymes:

- tryptophan hydroxylase (EC number 1.14.16.4), which controls levels of serotonin in the brain and the gastrointestinal tract
- tyrosine hydroxylase (EC number 1.14.16.2), which controls levels of dopamine, epinephrine, and norepinephrine in the brain and the adrenal medulla.

The three enzymes are homologous, that is, are thought to have evolved from the same ancient hydroxylase.
