= Mild non-BH4-deficient hyperphenylalaninemia =

Metabolic disorder

Mild non-BH4-deficient hyperphenylalaninemia (HPANBH4) is a rare metabolic disorder characterized by mild hyperphenylalaninemia (HPA) and a range of variable neurologic symptoms, including movement abnormalities and intellectual impairment. HPANBH4 has an autosomal-recessive pattern of inheritance.

== Causes ==
The disorder is caused by homozygous and compound heterozygous mutations in the DNAJC12 gene, which encodes a molecular chaperone belonging to the DnaJ/HSP40 family of proteins.

== History ==
Mild non-BH4-deficient hyperphenylalaninemia was first reported in 6 patients from 4 unrelated consanguineous families by a large group of researchers in 2017.

== Alternative names ==
- DNAJC12 deficiency
