= Sepiapterin reductase =

Mammalian protein found in Homo sapiens

SPR
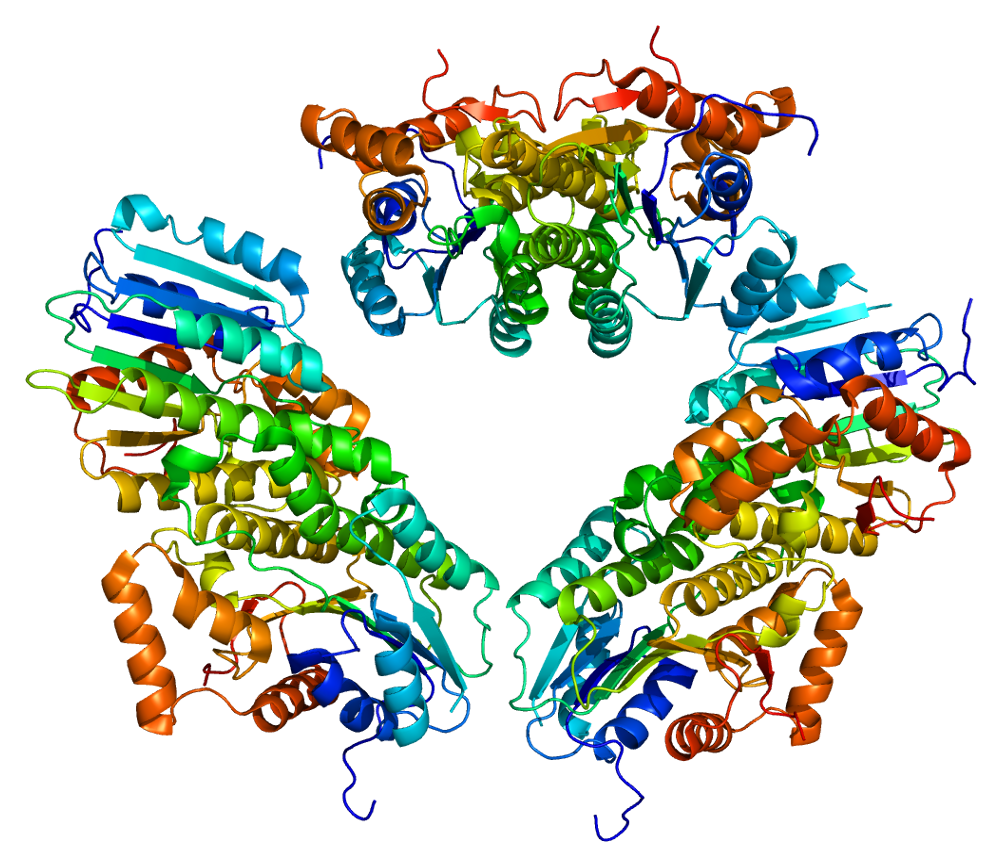

Identifiers
- Aliases: SPR, SDR38C1, sepiapterin reductase (7,8-dihydrobiopterin:NADP+ oxidoreductase), sepiapterin reductase
- External IDs: OMIM: 182125; MGI: 103078; GeneCards: SPR
Available structures
PDB	Ortholog search: PDBe RCSB
PDB	List of PDB id codes 1Z6Z, 4HWK, 4J7U, 4J7X, 4XWY, 4Z3K
Enzyme activity
EC #	BRENDA	ExPASy	KEGG	MetaCyc
1.1.1.153	↗	↗	↗	↗

Gene location (Human)
Chr.	Chromosome 2 (human)
Band	2p13.2	Start	72,887,382 bp
Band	2p13.2	End	72,892,158 bp

Gene location (Mouse)
Chr.	Chromosome 6 (mouse)
Band	6 C3|6 37.15 cM	Start	85,107,158 bp
Band	6 C3|6 37.15 cM	End	85,114,748 bp
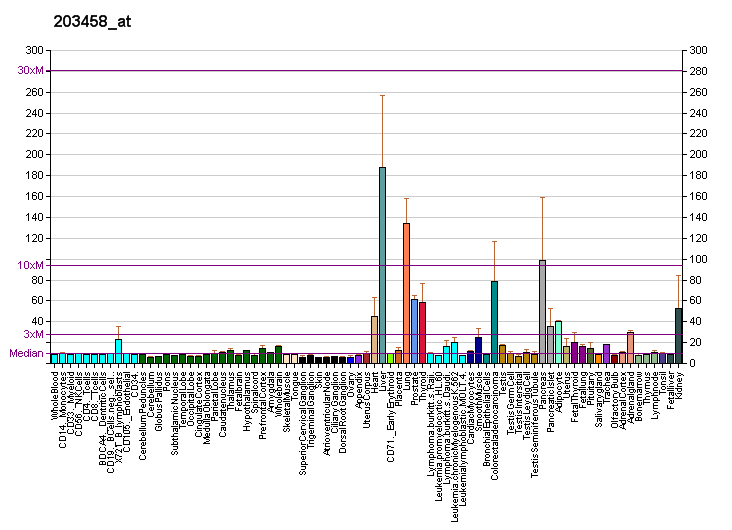
RNA expression pattern
Bgee	Human / Mouse (ortholog); Top expressed in: mucosa of transverse colon; right lobe of liver; right adrenal gland; right adrenal cortex; apex of heart; body of pancreas; left adrenal gland; left adrenal cortex; body of stomach; human kidney / Top expressed in: right kidney; ankle joint; human kidney; yolk sac; muscle of thigh; left lobe of liver; proximal tubule; lip; mucous cell of stomach; choroid plexus of fourth ventricle; More reference expression data
BioGPS	More reference expression data
Gene ontology
Molecular function	sepiapterin reductase activity; aldo-keto reductase (NADP) activity; NADP binding; oxidoreductase activity
Cellular component	nucleoplasm; extracellular exosome; cytoplasm; cytosol
Biological process	nitric oxide biosynthetic process; regulation of nitric-oxide synthase activity; tetrahydrobiopterin biosynthetic process
Sources:Amigo / QuickGO
Orthologs
Databases	NCBI: entry; OMA: entry
Species	Human	Mouse
Entrez	6697	20751
Ensembl	ENSG00000116096	ENSMUSG00000033735
UniProt	P35270	Q64105
RefSeq (mRNA)	NM_003124	NM_011467
RefSeq (protein)	NP_003115	n/a
Location (UCSC)	Chr 2: 72.89 – 72.89 Mb	Chr 6: 85.11 – 85.11 Mb
PubMed search
- Wikidata
View/Edit Human	View/Edit Mouse

Sepiapterin reductase is an enzyme that in humans is encoded by the SPR gene.

== Function ==
Sepiapterin reductase (7,8-dihydrobiopterin:NADP^{+} oxidoreductase; EC 1.1.1.153) catalyzes the NADPH-dependent reduction of various carbonyl substances, including derivatives of pteridines, and belongs to a group of enzymes called aldo-keto reductases. SPR plays an important role in the biosynthesis of tetrahydrobiopterin.

== Reaction ==
sepiapterin reductase
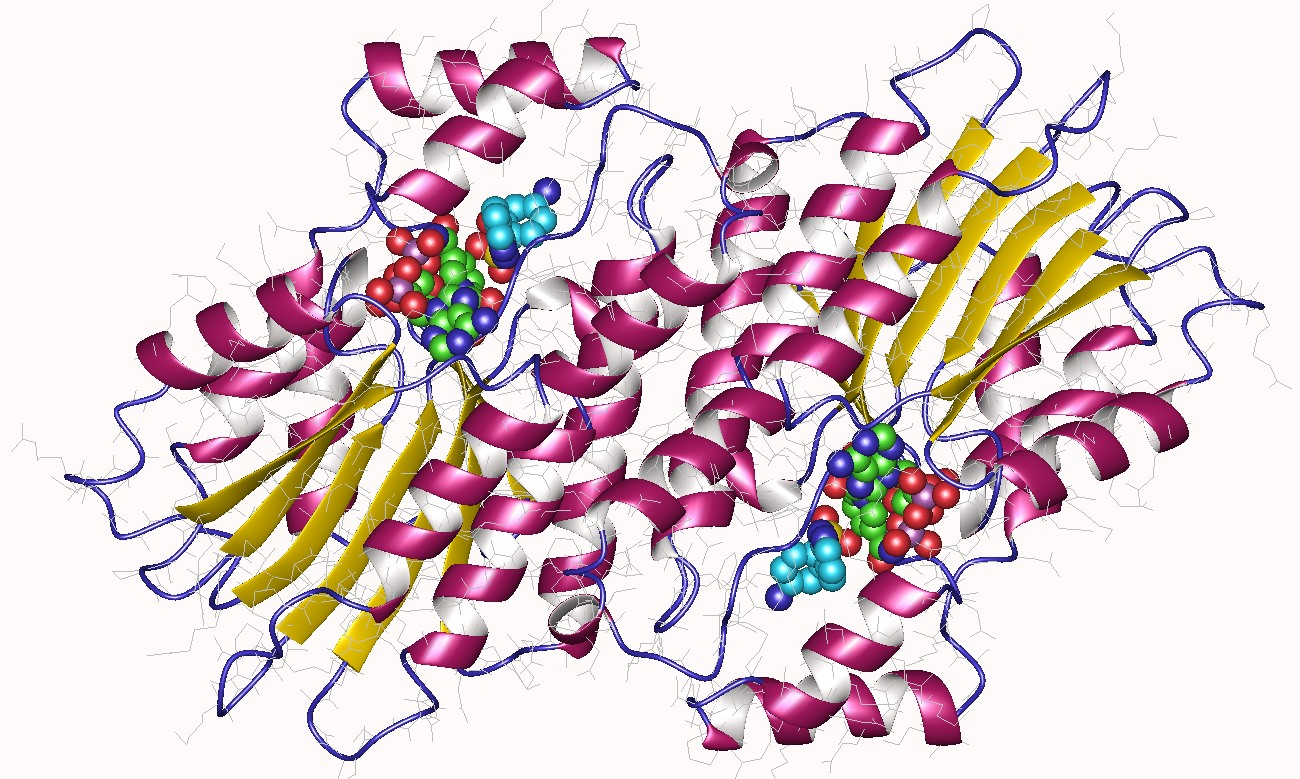
- Sepiapterin reductase homodimer, Human

Identifiers
- EC no.: 1.1.1.153

Databases
- BRENDA: enzyme data
- ExPASy: NiceZyme view
- KEGG: enzyme entry
- MetaCyc: metabolic pathway
- Rhea: reactions
- PDB structures: RCSB PDB PDBe PDBsum
- Gene Ontology: AmiGO / QuickGO
Search
- PMC: articles
- PubMed: articles
- NCBI: proteins

Sepiapterin reductase (SPR) catalyzes the chemical reaction

L-erythro-7,8-dihydrobiopterin
+ NADP^{+}
H^{+}
H^{+}
L-sepiapterin
+ NADPH

The two substrates of this enzyme are L-erythro-7,8-dihydrobiopterin and oxidised Nicotinamide adenine dinucleotide phosphate (NADP^{+}). Its products are sepiapterin, reduced NADPH, and a proton.

This enzyme belongs to the family of oxidoreductases, to be specific, those acting on the CH-OH group of donor with NAD^{+} or NADP^{+} as acceptor. The systematic name of this enzyme class is 7,8-dihydrobiopterin:NADP^{+} oxidoreductase. This enzyme participates in folate biosynthesis.

== Clinical significance ==
Mutations of the SPR gene may cause sepiapterin reductase deficiency, a rare disease. The clinical phenotype can include progressive psychomotor retardation, altered tone, seizures, choreoathetosis, temperature instability, hypersalivation, microcephaly, and irritability. Patients with sepiapterin reductase deficiency also manifest dystonia with diurnal variation, oculogyric crises, tremor, hypersomnolence, oculomotor apraxia, and weakness. Response to treatment is variable and the long-term and functional outcome is unknown. To provide a basis for improving the understanding of the epidemiology, genotype/phenotype correlation and outcome of these diseases their impact on the quality of life of patients, and for evaluating diagnostic and therapeutic strategies a patient registry was established by the noncommercial International Working Group on Neurotransmitter Related Disorders (iNTD).
