= Sepiapterin =

Medication

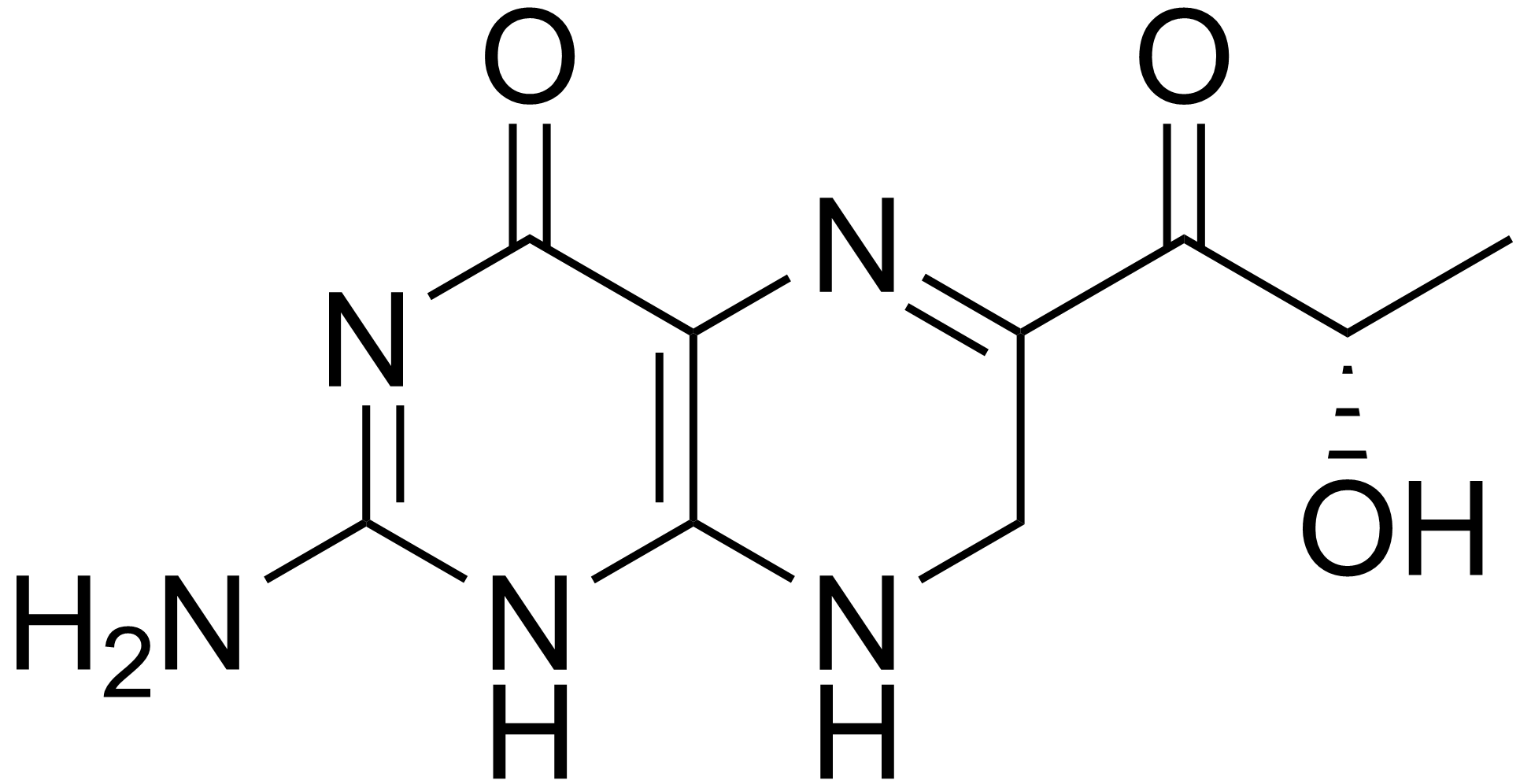

Clinical data
- Trade names: Sephience
- Other names: Sephience
- AHFS/Drugs.com: Monograph
- MedlinePlus: a625095
- License data: US DailyMed: Sepiapterin
- Routes of administration: By mouth
- ATC code: A16AX28 (WHO)

Legal status
- Legal status: AU: S4 (Prescription only); CA: ℞-only; US: ℞-only; EU: Rx-only

Identifiers
- IUPAC name: 2-amino-6-[(2S)-2-hydroxypropanoyl]-7,8-dihydro-1H-pteridin-4-one
- CAS Number: 17094-01-8
- PubChem CID: 65253
- IUPHAR/BPS: 5276
- DrugBank: DB16326
- ChemSpider: 58746
- UNII: CJQ26KO7HP
- KEGG: C00835
- ChEBI: CHEBI:194527
- ChEMBL: ChEMBL1255653
- PDB ligand: H4B (PDBe, RCSB PDB)

Chemical and physical data
- Formula: C_{9}H_{11}N_{5}O_{3}
- Molar mass: 237.219 g·mol^{−1}
- SMILES: None
- InChI: InChI=InChI=1S/C9H11N5O3/c1-3(15)6(16)4-2-11-7-5(12-4)8(17)14-9(10)13-7/h3,15H,2H2,1H3,(H4,10,11,13,14,17)/t3-/m0/s1; Key:VPVOXUSPXFPWBN-VKHMYHEASA-N

Sepiapterin, sold under the brand name Sephience, is a medication used for the treatment of hyperphenylalaninemia. Sepiapterin is a phenylalanine hydroxylase activator. It is also metabolite that is naturally synthesized in the human body.

The most common side effects are upper respiratory tract infection, headache, diarrhea, abdominal pain, hyperphenylalaninemia and discoloration of feces.

== Biochemistry ==
Sepiapterin is a naturally produced metabolite that can in turn be metabolized into tetrahydrobiopterin via a salvage pathway. Tetrahydrobiopterin is an essential cofactor in humans for breakdown of phenylalanine and a catalyst of the metabolism of phenylalanine, tyrosine, and tryptophan to precursors of the neurotransmitters dopamine and serotonin.

== Medical uses ==
Sepiapterin is indicated for the treatment of hyperphenylalaninemia in people with phenylketonuria.

== Side effects ==
The most common side effects are upper respiratory tract infection, headache, diarrhea, abdominal pain, hyperphenylalaninemia and discoloration of feces.

== Mechanism of action ==
Sepiapterin is a metabolite that is naturally synthesized in the human body. Synthetic sepiapterin also functions as a prodrug that serves as a precursor to tetrahydrobiopterin (BH4). The therapeutic effect of sepiapterin results from its conversion to BH4, which functions as a cofactor for phenylalanine hydroxylase (PAH). This enzymatic activity enables patients with phenylketonuria (PKU) to better metabolize phenylalanine, thereby reducing its neurotoxic concentration in the blood.

== Society and culture ==
=== Legal status ===
In April 2025, the Committee for Medicinal Products for Human Use of the European Medicines Agency adopted a positive opinion, recommending the granting of a marketing authorization for the medicinal product Sephience, intended for the treatment of hyperphenylalaninemia in adults and children with phenylketonuria. The applicant for this medicinal product is PTC Therapeutics International Limited. Sepiapterin was authorized for medical use in the European Union in June 2025.

Sepiapterin was approved for medical use in the United States in July 2025.

== Research ==
Deficiency of tetrahydrobiopterin can cause toxic buildup of phenylalanine (phenylketonuria) as well as deficiencies of dopamine, norepinephrine, and epinephrine, leading to dystonia and other neurological illnesses. This has led to clinical study of sepiapterin in humans to treat tetrahydrobiopterin deficiency.

Since atherosclerosis and other circulatory diseases associated with diabetes are also associated with tetrahydrobiopterin deficiency, animal studies of the value of sepiaterin in these vascular diseases have been done. These studies show that relaxation of the blood vessels studied was impaired after animals were given sepiapterin, even though their levels of tetrahydrobiopterin were replenished.
