= Pterin =

Substituted bicyclic heterocyclic compound derived from pteridine

- Pterine numbering

Names
- IUPAC names 2-Aminopteridin-4(3H)-one (one of many tautomers; see text)
- Other names Pteridoxamine; Pterine; 4-Oxopterin; 2-Amino-4-pteridone; 2-Amino-4-hydroxypteridine; 2-Amino-4-oxopteridine; 2-aminopteridin-4-ol 2-Amino-4-pteridinol

Identifiers
CAS Number	2236-60-4
3D model (JSmol)	Interactive image
ChEBI	CHEBI:44992
ChEMBL	ChEMBL278009
ChemSpider	65806
ECHA InfoCard	100.017.091
PubChem CID	73000
UNII	85MA24E1NH
CompTox Dashboard (EPA)	DTXSID40176894
- InChI: InChI=1S/C6H5N5O/c7-6-10-4-3(5(12)11-6)8-1-2-9-4/h1-2H,(H3,7,9,10,11,12) Key: HNXQXTQTPAJEJL-UHFFFAOYSA-N; InChI=1/C6H5N5O/c7-6-10-4-3(5(12)11-6)8-1-2-9-4/h1-2H,(H3,7,9,10,11,12) Key: HNXQXTQTPAJEJL-UHFFFAOYAD
- SMILES: O=C2\N=C(/Nc1nccnc12)N

Properties
Chemical formula	C_{6}H_{5}N_{5}O
Molar mass	163.137
- Except where otherwise noted, data are given for materials in their standard state (at 25 °C [77 °F], 100 kPa). verify (what is ?) Infobox references

Pterin is a heterocyclic compound composed of a pteridine ring system, with a "keto group" (a lactam) and an amino group on positions 4 and 2 respectively. It is structurally related to the parent bicyclic heterocycle called pteridine. Pterins, as a group, are compounds related to pterin with additional substituents. Pterin itself is of no biological significance.

Pterins were first discovered in the pigments of butterfly wings (hence the origin of their name, from the Greek pteron (πτερόν), wing) and perform many roles in coloration in the biological world.

== Chemistry ==
Pterins exhibit a wide range of tautomerism in water, beyond what is assumed by just keto-enol tautomerism. For the unsubstituted pterin, at least five tautomers are commonly cited. For 6-methylpterin, seven tautomers are theoretically predicted to be important in solution.

The pteridine ring system contains four nitrogen atoms, reducing its aromaticity to the point that it can be attacked by nucleophile. Pterins can take three oxidation states on the ring system: the unprefixed oxidized form, the 7,8-dihydro semi-reduced form (among other, less stable tautomers), and finally the 5,6,7,8-tetrahydro fully-reduced form. The latter two are more common in biological systems.

=== Tautomers ===
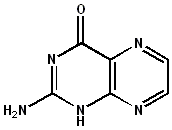
2-aminopteridin-4(1H)-one

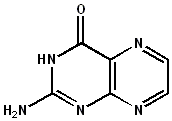
2-aminopteridin-4(3H)-one

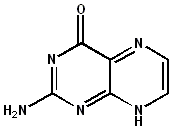
2-aminopteridin-4(8H)-one

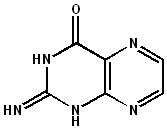
2-imino-2,3-dihydropteridin-4(1H)-on

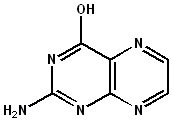
2-aminopteridin-4-ol

The above series of structures shows 5 of the possible tautomers of pterin. They only differ in the position of hydrogen atoms on oxygen or nitrogen. In water, and thus biological systems, this structures are in a fast equilibrium, meaning each of the structures might be present to perform a reaction. Although the pattern of single and double bonds in the ring system changes with the position of the hydrogen atoms, the overall π-system does not change. (Note: By accepting a hydrogen ion on its lone pair, nitrogen still has a p-orbital perfectly in line with the others in the ring system.) What does change is the charge distribution and hence the possible reactions of the species. With respect to reaction speed, if a single tautomer is required, each molecule spends part of its time as one of the tautomers. This might reduce the speed of reaction, leaving a very fast (enzymatic!) reaction just to be fast.

== Biosynthesis ==
Pterin rings are either salvaged from existing ones or produced de novo in living organisms. The ring comes from rearrangement of guanosine in bacteria and humans.

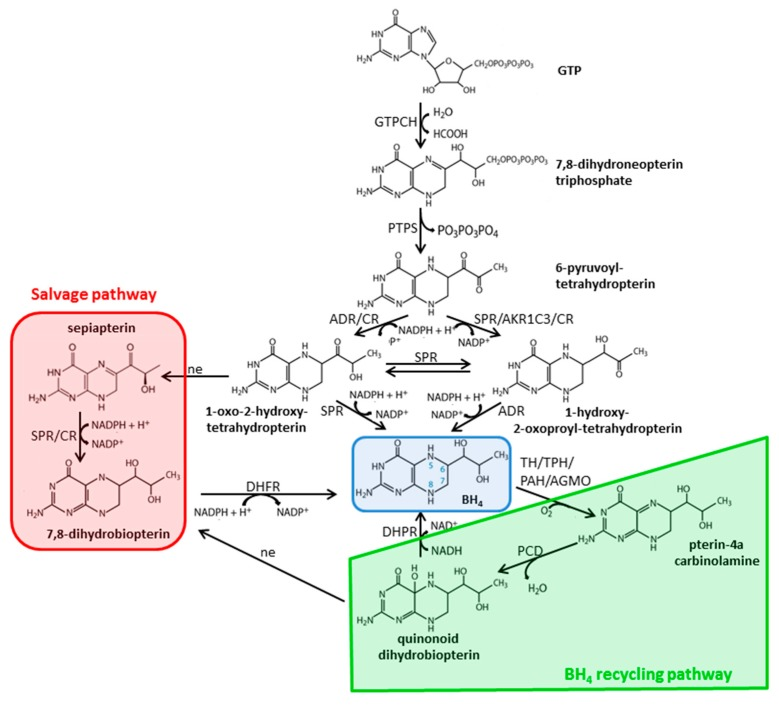
Biosynthesis of tetrahydrobiopterin (BH_{4}) and derivatives. Sepiapterin is a yellow pigment.

== Pterin cofactors ==
Pterin derivatives are common cofactors in all domains of life.

=== Folates ===
One important family of pterin derivatives are folates. Folates are pterins that contain p-aminobenzoic acid connected to the methyl group at position 6 of the pteridine ring system (known as pteroic acid) conjugated with one or more L-glutamates. They participate in numerous biological group transfer reactions. Folate-dependent biosynthetic reactions include the transfer of methyl groups from 5-methyltetrahydrofolate to homocysteine to form L-methionine, and the transfer of formyl groups from 10-formyltetrahydrofolate to L-methionine to form N-formylmethionine in initiator tRNAs. Folates are also essential for the biosynthesis of purines and one pyrimidine.

Substituted pteridines are intermediates in the biosynthesis of dihydrofolic acid in many microorganisms. The enzyme dihydropteroate synthetase converts pteridine and 4-aminobenzoic acid to dihydrofolic acid in the presence of glutamate. The enzyme dihydropteroate synthetase is inhibited by sulfonamide antibiotics.

=== Molybdopterin ===
Molybdopterin is a cofactor found in virtually all molybdenum and tungsten-containing proteins. It binds molybdenum to yield redox cofactors involved in biological hydroxylations, reduction of nitrate, and respiratory oxidation. Molybdopterin biosynthesis is described here.

=== Tetrahydrobiopterin ===
Tetrahydrobiopterin, the major unconjugated pterin in vertebrates, is involved in three families of enzymes that effect hydroxylation. The aromatic amino acid hydroxylases include phenylalanine hydroxylase, tyrosine hydroxylase, and tryptophan hydroxylases. They are involved in the synthesis of neurotransmitters catecholamine and serotonin. Tetrahydrobiopterin is also required for the functioning of alkylglycerol monooxygenase, whereby monoalkylglycerols are broken down to glycerol and an aldehyde. In the synthesis of nitric oxide the pterin-dependent nitric oxide synthase converts arginine to its N-hydroxy derivative, which in turn releases nitric oxide.

=== Other pterins ===
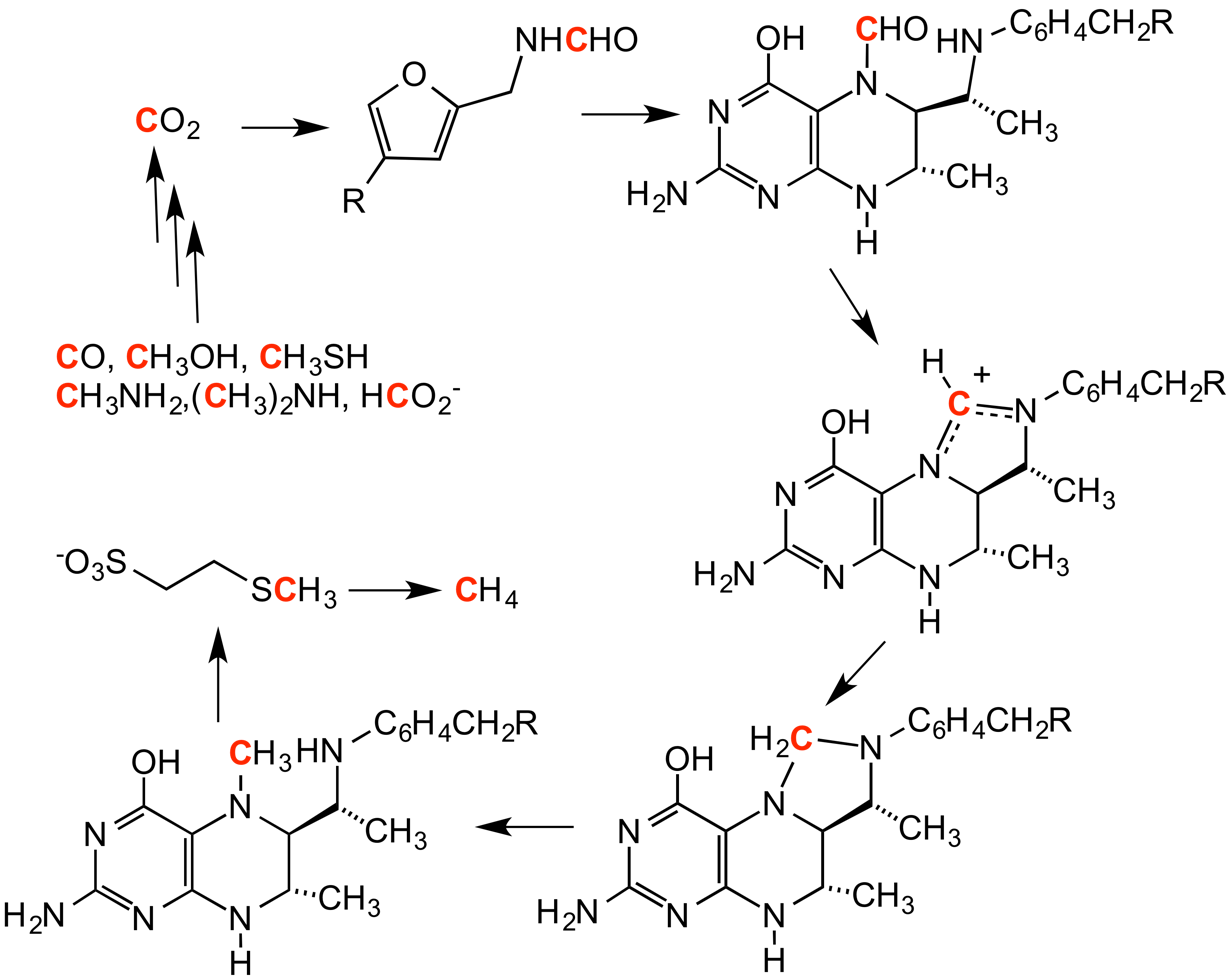
Cycle for methanogenesis, showing intermediates.

Tetrahydromethanopterin is a cofactor in methanogenesis, which is a metabolism adopted by many organisms, as a form of anaerobic respiration. It carries the C1 substrate in the course of the formation or production of methane. It is structurally similar to folate.

=== Pterin pigments ===
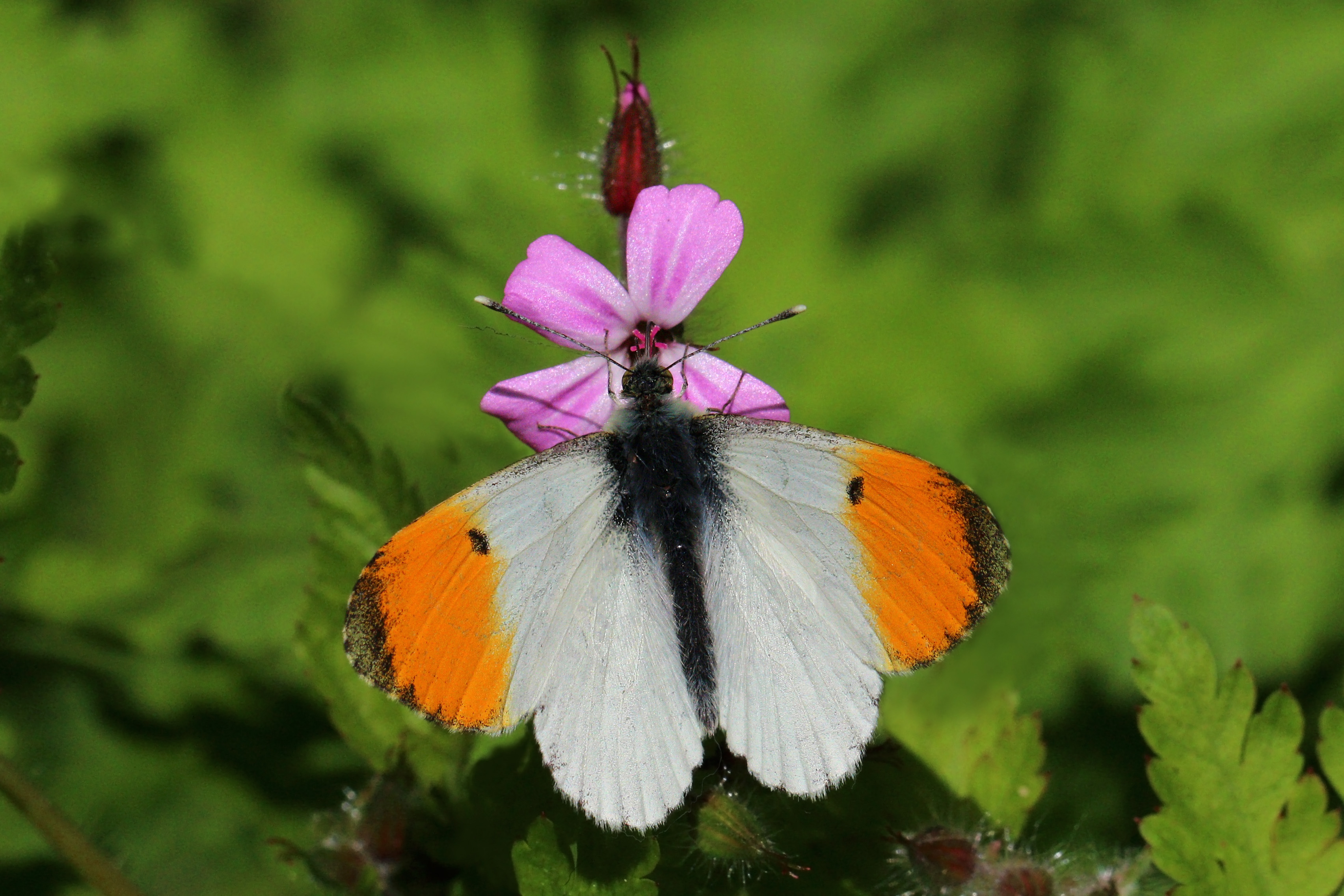
The wings of the orange tip butterfly are colored by orange pterin-containing pigments.

Cyanopterin is a glycosylated derivative of pteridine, having an unknown function in cyanobacteria.

== See also ==
- Folic acid
- Molybdopterin
- Pteridine
- Tetrahydrobiopterin
- Tetrahydromethanopterin
