= Causes of mental disorders =

Etiology of psychopathology

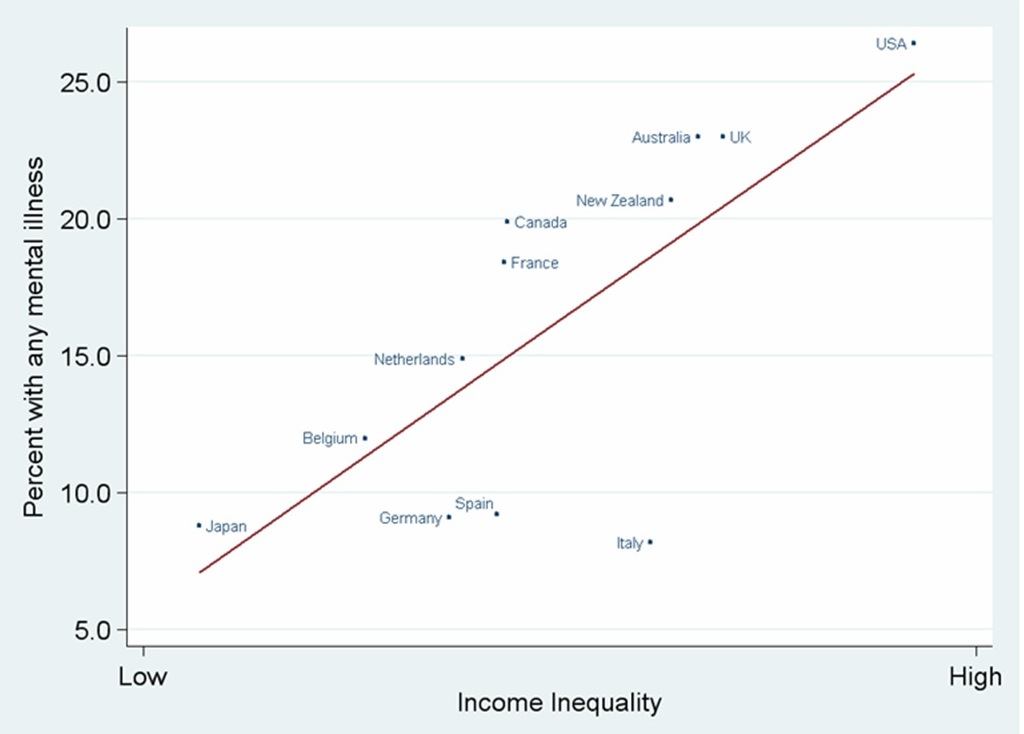
Image 1: The prevalence of mental illness is higher in more unequal rich countries

A mental disorder is an impairment of the mind disrupting normal thinking, feeling, mood, behavior, or social interactions, and accompanied by significant distress or dysfunction. The causes of mental disorders are very complex and vary depending on the particular disorder and the individual. Although the causes of most mental disorders are not fully understood, researchers have identified a variety of biological, psychological, and environmental factors that can contribute to the development or progression of mental disorders. Most mental disorders result from a combination of several different factors rather than just a single factor.

== Risk factors ==
Risk factors for mental illness include psychological trauma, adverse childhood experiences, genetic predisposition, and personality traits. Correlations between mental disorders and substance use are also found to have a two way relationship, in that substance use can lead to the development of mental disorders and having mental disorders can lead to substance abuse. This effect is stronger and more reliable in some substance use than others.

Mental illnesses have risk factors including unequal treatment, adverse life events and drug use, migration and discrimination, childhood trauma, loss or separation, cannabis use in schizophrenia and psychosis, parenting factors, child abuse, family history (e.g. of anxiety), temperament and attitudes (e.g. pessimism) in anxiety. Many psychiatric disorders include problems with impulse and other emotional control.

In February 2013, a study found genetic links between five major psychiatric disorders: autism, ADHD, bipolar disorder, major depressive disorder, and schizophrenia. Abnormal functioning of neurotransmitter systems is also responsible for some mental disorders, including serotonin, norepinephrine, dopamine, and glutamate system's abnormal functioning. Differences have also been found in the size or activity of specific brain regions in some cases. Psychological mechanisms have also been implicated, such as cognitive (e.g. reasoning) biases, emotional influences, personality dynamics, temperament, and coping style. Studies have indicated that variation in genes can play an important role in the evolution of mental disorders, although the reliable identification of connections between specific genes and specific disorders has proven more difficult. Environmental events surrounding pregnancy (such as maternal hypertension, preeclampsia, or infection) and birth have also been implicated. Traumatic brain injury may increase the risk of developing certain mental disorders. Throughout the years, there have been inconsistent links found to certain viral infections, substance misuse, and general physical health that have been false.

Adverse experiences affect a person's mental health, including abuse, neglect, bullying, social stress, traumatic events, and other overwhelming life experiences. The specific risks and pathways to particular disorders are less clear, however. Aspects of the wider community have also been implicated, including employment problems, socioeconomic inequality, lack of social cohesion, problems linked to migration, and features of particular societies and cultures. The loss of cultural connection can result in cultural bereavement.

== Theories ==
=== General theories ===
Several theories or models seek to explain the causes (etiology) of mental disorders. These theories may differ in regards to how they explain the cause of the disorder, how to treat the disorder, and how they classify mental disorders. Theories also differ about the philosophy of mind they accept; that is, whether the mind and brain are identical or not.

During most of the 20th century, mental illness was ascribable to problematic relationships between children and their parents. This view was held well into the late 1990s, in which people still believed this child-parent relationship was a large determinant of severe mental illness, such as depression and schizophrenia. In the 21st century, additional factors have been identified such as genetic contributions, though experience also plays a role. So, the perceived causes of mental illness have changed over time and will most likely continue to alter while more research develops throughout the years.

A practical mixture of models will explain particular issues and disorders, although there may be difficulty defining boundaries for indistinct psychiatric syndromes.

=== Medical or biomedical model ===
An overall distinction is also commonly made between a "medical model" (also known as a biomedical or disease model) and a "social model" (also known as an empowerment or recovery model) of mental disorder and disability, with the former focusing on hypothesized disease processes and symptoms, along with latter focusing on hypothesized social constructionism and social contexts.

Biological psychiatry has tended to follow a biomedical model focused on organic or "hardware" pathology of the brain, where many mental disorders are conceptualized as disorders of brain circuits shaped by a complex interplay of genetics and experience.

The social and medical models of mental disorders each work to identify and study distinct aspects, solutions, and potential therapies of disorders. The intersection and cross reference between the two models can further be used to develop more holistic models of mental disorders. Many criticisms historically of each model is the exclusivity of the other perspective. Therefore, intersectional research improved the impact and importance of future findings.

=== Biopsychosocial model ===
The primary model of contemporary mainstream Western psychiatry is the biopsychosocial model (BPS), which integrates biological, psychological, and social factors. The Biopsychosocial model was first conceptualised by George Engel in 1977, suggesting that to understand a person's medical condition it is not simply the biological factors to consider, but also the psychological and social factors. The biopsychosocial approach systematically considers biological, psychological, and social factors and their complex interactions in understanding health, illness, and health care delivery. Biological, psychological, and social factors exist along a continuum of natural systems. The factors within the model contain the following:

- Biological (physiological pathology)
- Psychological (thoughts emotions and behaviours such as psychological distress, fear/avoidance beliefs, current coping methods and attribution)
- Social (socio-economical, socio-environmental, and cultural factors such as work issues, family circumstances and benefits/economics)

This model is commonly used for case conceptualization of psychological disorders as well as chronic pain, with the view that the pain is a psychophysiological behavior pattern that cannot be categorised into biological, psychological, or social factors alone.

A related view, the diathesis-stress model, posits that mental disorders result from genetic dispositions and environmental stressors, combining to cause patterns of distress or dysfunction. The model is one way to explain why some individuals are more vulnerable to mental disorders than others. Additionally, it explains why some people may develop a mental disorder after exposure to stressful life events while others do not.

=== Psychoanalytic theories ===
Psychoanalytic theories focus on unresolved internal and relational conflicts. These theories have been predicated as explanations of mental disorders. Many psychoanalytic groups are said to adhere to the biopsychosocial model and to accept an eclectic mix of subtypes of psychoanalysis. Sigmund Freud developed the psychoanalytic theory. This theory focuses on the impact of unconscious forces on human behavior. According to Freud, a personality has three parts: the id, ego, and superego. The id operates under the pleasure principle, the ego operates under the reality principle, and the superego is the "conscience" and incorporates what is and is not socially acceptable into a person's value system. According to the psychoanalytic theory, there are five stages of psychosexual development that everyone goes through the oral stage, anal stage, phallic stage, latency stage, and genital stage. Mental disorders can be caused by an individual receiving too little or too much gratification in one of the psychosexual developmental stages. When this happens, the individual is said to be in that developmental stage.

=== Attachment theory ===
Attachment theory is a kind of evolutionary-psychological approach sometimes applied in the context of mental disorders, which focuses on the role of early caregiver-child relationships, responses to danger, and the search for a satisfying reproductive relationship in adulthood. According to this theory, a child's attachment is to a nurturing adult, the more likely that child will maintain healthy relationships with others in their life. As found by the Strange Situation experiment run by Mary Ainsworth based on the formulations of John Bowlby, there are four patterns of attachment: secure attachment, avoidant attachment, disorganized attachment, and ambivalent attachment. Later research found the fourth pattern of attachment is known as disorganized disoriented attachment. Secure attachments reflect trust in the child-caretaker relationship while insecure attachment reflects mistrust. The security of attachment in a child affects the child's emotional, cognitive, and social competence later in life.

=== Evolutionary psychology ===
Evolutionary psychology and evolutionary psychiatry posit that mental disorders involve the dysfunctional operation of mental modules adapted to ancestral physical or social environments but not necessarily to modern ones. Behavioral abnormalities that resemble human mental illness have been found in related species (great apes).

Other theories suggest that mental illness could have evolutionary advantages for the species, including enhancing creativity and stress to enhance survival by activating the flight-or-fight response in anticipation of danger.

Mania and depression could have benefited from seasonal changes by helping to increase energy levels during times of plenty and rejuvenating energy during times of scarcity. In this way, mania was set in motion during the spring and summer to facilitate energy for hunting; depression worked best during the winter, similar to how bears hibernate to recover their energy levels. This may explain the connection between circadian genes and bipolar disorder and explain the relationship between light and seasonal affective disorder.

== Biological factors ==
Biological factors consist of anything physical that can cause adverse effects on a person's mental health. Biological factors include genetics, prenatal damage, infections, exposure to toxins, brain defects or injuries, and substance abuse. Many professionals believe that the cause of mental disorders is the biology of the brain and the nervous system.

Mind mentions genetic factors, long-term physical health conditions, and head injuries or epilepsy (affecting behavior and mood) as factors that may trigger an episode of mental illness.

=== Genetics ===
Some rare mental disorders are caused only by genetics such as Huntington's disease.

Family linkage and some twin studies have indicated that genetic factors often play a role in the heritability of mental disorders. The reliable identification of specific genetic variation can cause indication of higher risk to particular disorders, through linkage, Genome Wide Association Scores or association studies, has proven difficult. This is due to the complexity of interactions between genes, environmental events, and early development or the need for new research strategies. No specific gene results in a complex trait disorder, but specific variations of alleles result in higher risk for a trait. The heritability of behavioral traits associated with a mental disorder may be in permissive than in restrictive environments, and susceptibility genes probably work through both "within-the-skin" (physiological) pathways and "outside-the-skin" (behavioral and social) pathways. Investigations increasingly focus on links between genes and endophenotypes because they are more specific traits. Some include neurophysiological, biochemical, endocrinological, neuroanatomical, cognitive, or neuropsychological, rather than disease categories. Concerning a well-known mental disorder, schizophrenia, it is said with certainty that alleles (forms of genes) were responsible for this disorder. Some research has indicated only multiple, rare mutations are thought to alter neurodevelopmental pathways that can ultimately contribute to schizophrenia; virtually every rare structural mutation was different in each individual.

Research has shown that many conditions are polygenic meaning there are multiple defective genes rather than only one that is responsible for a disorder, and these genes may also be pleiotropic meaning that they cause multiple disorders, not just one. Schizophrenia and Alzheimer's are both examples of hereditary mental disorders. When exonic genes encode for proteins, these proteins do not just affect one trait. The pathways that contribute to complex traits and phenotypes interact with multiple systems, even though proteins have specific functions. brain plasticity (neuroplasticity) raises questions of whether some brain differences may be caused by mental illnesses or by pre-existing and then causing them.

==== Attention deficit hyperactivity disorder ====
Literature reviews published in Biological Psychiatry and in Molecular Psychiatry have found the average heritability estimate of ADHD to be from 0.74 to 0.8, based on family, twin studies, and adoption studies. Additionally, evolutionary psychiatrist Randolph M. Nesse has argued that the 5:1 male-to-female sex ratio in the epidemiology of ADHD suggests that ADHD may be the end of a continuum where males are overrepresented at the tails, citing clinical psychologist Simon Baron-Cohen's suggestion for the sex ratio in the epidemiology of autism as an analogue.

Natural selection has been acting against genetic variants for ADHD over at least 45,000 years, complicating the suggestion that ADHD was adaptive in the human evolutionary past. The disorder may remain at a stable rate by the balance of genetic mutations and removal rate (natural selection) across generations; over thousands of years, these genetic variants become more stable, decreasing disorder prevalence. During human evolution, executive functions disrupted in ADHD likely provide the capacity to bind contingencies across time, thereby directing behaviour toward future over immediate events so as to maximise social consequences for humans.

There are multiple gene variants which each slightly increase the likelihood of a person having ADHD; it is polygenic and thus arises through the accumulation of many genetic risks each having a very small effect. The siblings of children with ADHD are three to four times more likely to develop the disorder than siblings of children without the disorder.

The association of maternal smoking observed in large population studies disappears after adjusting for family history of ADHD, which indicates that the association between maternal smoking during pregnancy and ADHD is due to familial or genetic factors that increase the risk for the confluence of smoking and ADHD.

ADHD presents with reduced size, functional connectivity and activation as well as low noradrenergic and dopaminergic functioning in brain regions and networks crucial for executive functioning and self-regulation. Typically, a number of genes are involved, many of which directly affect brain functioning and neurotransmission. Those involved with dopamine include DAT, DRD4, DRD5, TAAR1, MAOA, COMT, and DBH. Other genes associated with ADHD include SERT, HTR1B, SNAP25, GRIN2A, ADRA2A, TPH2, and BDNF. A common variant of a gene called latrophilin 3 is estimated to be responsible for about 9% of cases and when this variant is present, people are particularly responsive to stimulant medication. The 7 repeat variant of dopamine receptor D4 (DRD4–7R) causes increased inhibitory effects induced by dopamine and is associated with ADHD. The DRD4 receptor is a G protein-coupled receptor that inhibits adenylyl cyclase. The DRD4–7R mutation results in a wide range of behavioural phenotypes, including ADHD symptoms reflecting split attention. The DRD4 gene is both linked to novelty seeking and ADHD. The genes GFOD1 and CDH13 show strong genetic associations with ADHD. CDH13's association with autism spectrum disorder (ASD), schizophrenia, bipolar disorder, and depression make it an interesting candidate causative gene. Another candidate causative gene that has been identified is ADGRL3. In zebrafish, knockout of this gene causes a loss of dopaminergic function in the ventral diencephalon and the fish display a hyperactive/impulsive phenotype.

For genetic variation to be used as a tool for diagnosis, more validating studies need to be performed. However, smaller studies have shown that genetic polymorphisms in genes related to catecholaminergic neurotransmission or the SNARE complex of the synapse can reliably predict a person's response to stimulant medication. Rare genetic variants show more relevant clinical significance as their penetrance (the chance of developing the disorder) tends to be much higher. However their usefulness as tools for diagnosis is limited as no single gene predicts ADHD. ASD shows genetic overlap with ADHD at both common and rare levels of genetic variation.

Evolutionary theorists view ADHD traits (such as novelty-seeking, rapid task-switching, and high exploratory drive) as possible cognitive specialisations that were advantageous in ancestral forager-gatherer environments. In modern structured settings these traits may become mismatched, leading to functional impairment. A recent evolutionary-mismatch hypothesis proposes that high trait curiosity associated with ADHD prepared ancestors to discover new opportunities in unpredictable environments, but in information-saturated, stable modern settings this drive may manifest as distractibility or impulsivity.

==== Bipolar disorder ====
Behavioral genetic studies have suggested that many chromosomal regions and candidate genes are related to bipolar disorder susceptibility with each gene exerting a mild to moderate effect. The risk of bipolar disorder is nearly ten-fold higher in first-degree relatives of those with bipolar disorder than in the general population; similarly, the risk of major depressive disorder is three times higher in relatives of those with bipolar disorder than in the general population.

Although the first genetic linkage finding for mania was in 1969, linkage studies have been inconsistent. Findings point strongly to heterogeneity, with different genes implicated in different families. Robust and replicable genome-wide significant associations showed several common single-nucleotide polymorphisms (SNPs) are associated with bipolar disorder, including variants within the genes CACNA1C, ODZ4, and NCAN. The largest and most recent genome-wide association study failed to find any locus that exerts a large effect, reinforcing the idea that no single gene is responsible for bipolar disorder in most cases. Polymorphisms in BDNF, DRD4, DAO, and TPH1 have been frequently associated with bipolar disorder and were initially associated in a meta-analysis, but this association disappeared after correction for multiple testing. On the other hand, two polymorphisms in TPH2 were identified as being associated with bipolar disorder.

Due to the inconsistent findings in a genome-wide association study, multiple studies have undertaken the approach of analyzing SNPs in biological pathways. Signaling pathways traditionally associated with bipolar disorder that have been supported by these studies include corticotropin-releasing hormone signaling, cardiac β-adrenergic signaling, phospholipase C signaling, glutamate receptor signaling, cardiac hypertrophy signaling, Wnt signaling, Notch signaling, and endothelin 1 signaling. Of the 16 genes identified in these pathways, three were found to be dysregulated in the dorsolateral prefrontal cortex portion of the brain in post-mortem studies: CACNA1C, GNG2, and ITPR2.

Bipolar disorder is associated with reduced expression of specific DNA repair enzymes and increased levels of oxidative DNA damages. The AKAP11 gene was discovered in 2022 as the first gene linked to bipolar disorder. The exomes of around 14,000 individuals with bipolar disorder were analyzed and compared to those without the condition. The findings were combined with data from another study in the Schizophrenia Exome Sequencing Meta-Analysis (SCHEMA), examining the genome sequences of 24,000 people alongside the original 14,000 bipolar disorder cases. This study identified genetic variants, including the AKAP11 gene, associated with an increased risk of bipolar disorder. The AKAP11 gene's interaction with the GSK3B protein, a molecular target of lithium, points to a possible mechanism behind the medication's therapeutic effects.

=== Prenatal damage ===
Any damage that occurs to a fetus while still in its mother's womb is considered prenatal damage. Mental disorders can develop if the pregnant mother uses drugs or alcohol or is exposed to illnesses or infections during pregnancy. Environmental events surrounding pregnancy and birth have increased the development of mental illness in the offspring. Some events may include maternal exposure to stress or trauma, conditions of famine, obstetric birth complications, infections, and gestational exposure to alcohol or cocaine. These factors have been hypothesized to affect areas of neurodevelopment, general development, and restrict neuroplasticity.

=== Infection, disease and toxins ===
==== Infection ====
There have been some findings of links between infection by the parasite Toxoplasma gondii and schizophrenia.

AIDS has been linked to some mental disorders. Research shows that infections and exposure to toxins such as HIV and streptococcus cause dementia. This HIV infection that makes its way to the brain is called encephalopathy which spreads itself through the brain leading to dementia. The infections or toxins that trigger a change in the brain chemistry can develop into a mental disorder.

Depression and emotional liability may be also be caused by babesiosis.

There is some evidence that there may be a relationship between BoDV-1 infection and psychiatric disease.

The research on Lyme disease caused by a deer tick and toxins is expanding the link between bacterial infections and mental illness.

==== Disease ====
Depression, anxiety, mania, psychosis, vegetative symptoms, cognitive deficit and consciousness impairment may be caused by internal disease as well as endocrine and metabolic disorders, deficiency states and neurologic disorders.

=== Injury and brain defects ===
Any damage to the brain can cause a mental disorder. The brain is the control system for the nervous system and the rest of the body. Without it, the body cannot function properly.

Increased mood swings, insane behavior, and substance abuse disorders are traumatic brain injury (TBI) examples. Findings on the relationship between TBI severity and prevalence of subsequent psychiatric disorders have been inconsistent, and occurrence relates to prior mental health problems and direct neurophysiological effects in a complex interaction with personality, attitude, and social influences.

Head trauma classifies as either open or closed head injury. In open head injury, the skull is punctured and the brain tissue is demolished. Closed head injury is more common, the skull is not punctured because there is an impact of the brain against the skull that creates permanent structural damage (subdural hematoma). With both types, symptoms may disappear or persist over time. Typically the longer the length of time spent unconscious and the length of post-traumatic amnesia the worse the prognosis for the individual. The cognitive residual symptoms of head trauma are associated with the type of injury (either an open head injury or closed head injury) and the amount of tissue destroyed. Closed injury head trauma symptoms include; Deficits in abstract reasoning ability, judgment, memory, and marked personality changes. Open injury head trauma symptoms tend to be the experience of classic neuropsychological syndromes like aphasia, visual-spatial disorders, and types of memory or perceptual disorders.

Brain tumors are classified as either malignant and benign, and as intrinsic (directly infiltrate the parenchyma of the brain) or extrinsic (grows on the external surface of the brain and produces symptoms as a result of pressure on the brain tissue). Progressive cognitive changes associated with brain tumors may include confusion, poor comprehension, and even dementia. Symptoms tend to depend on the location of the tumor in the brain. For example, tumors on the frontal lobe tend to be associated with the sign of impairment of judgment, apathy, and loss of the ability to regulate/modulate behavior.

Findings have indicated abnormal functioning of brainstem structures in individuals with mental disorders such as schizophrenia, and other disorders that have to do with impairments in maintaining sustained attention. Some abnormalities in the average size or shape of some regions of the brain have been found in some disorders, reflecting genes and experiences. Studies of schizophrenia have tended to find enlarged ventricles and sometimes reduced volume of the cerebrum and hippocampus, while studies of (psychotic) bipolar disorder have sometimes found increased amygdala volume. Findings differ over whether volumetric abnormalities are risk factors or are only found alongside the course of mental health problems, possibly reflecting neurocognitive or emotional stress processes and medication use or substance use. Some studies have also found reduced hippocampal volumes in major depression, possibly worsening with time depressed.

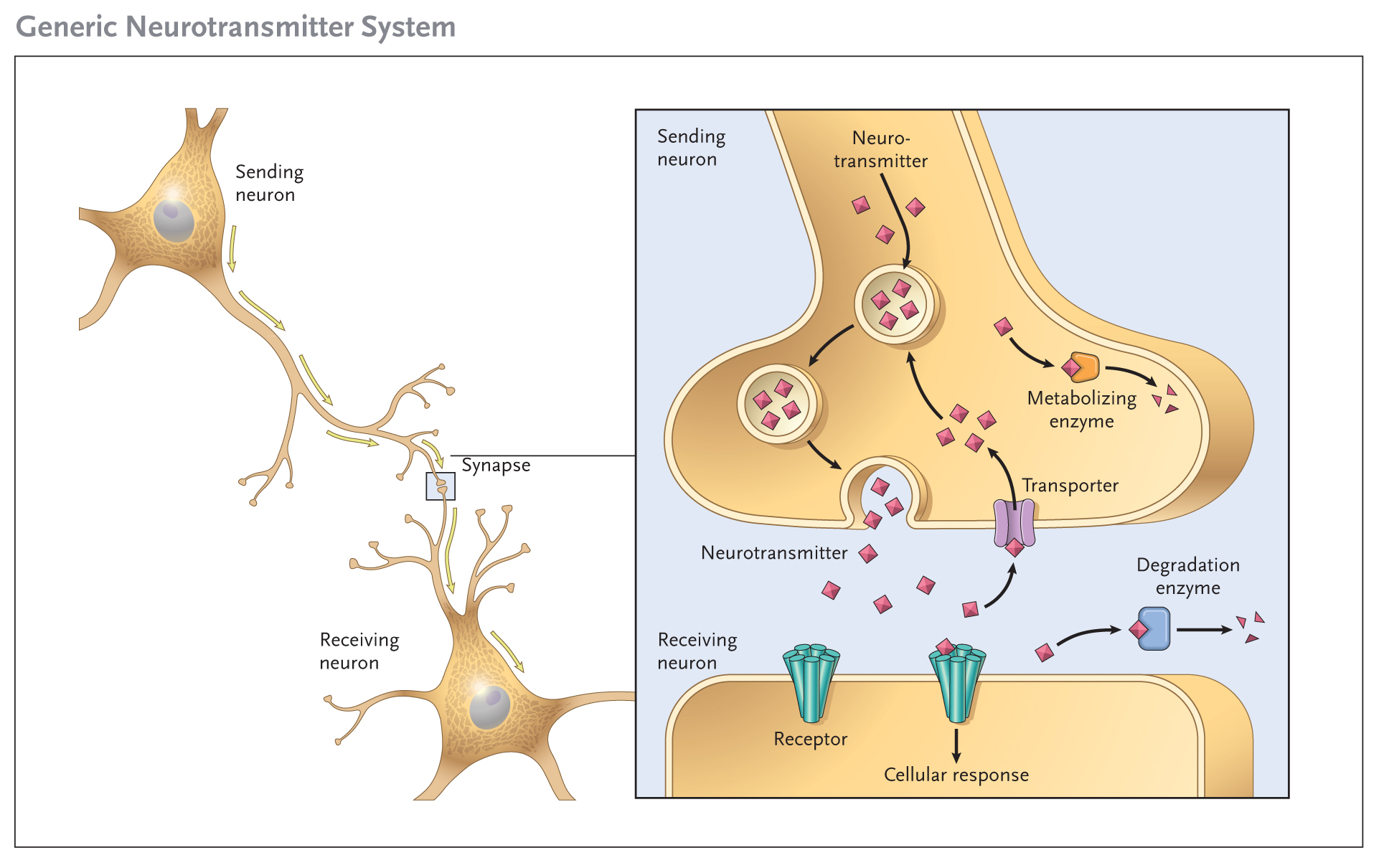
Generic Neurotransmitter System

=== Neurotransmitter systems ===
Abnormal levels of dopamine activity correspond with several disorders (reduced in ADHD and OCD, and increased in schizophrenia). The dysfunction in serotonin and other monoamine neurotransmitters (norepinephrine and dopamine) correspond with certain mental disorders and their associated neural networks. Some include major depression, obsessive-compulsive disorder, phobias, post-traumatic stress disorder, and generalized anxiety disorder. Studies of depleted levels of monoamine neurotransmitters show an association with depression and other psychiatric disorders, but "... it should be questioned whether 5-HT [serotonin] represents just one of the final and not the main, factors in the neurological chain of events underlying psychopathological symptoms...."

Simplistic "chemical imbalance" explanations for mental disorders have never received empirical support; and most prominent psychiatrists, neuroscientists, and psychologists have not espoused such ill-defined, facile etiological theories. Instead, neurotransmitter systems have been understood in the context of the diathesis-stress or biopsychosocial models. The following 1967 quote from renowned psychiatric and neuroscience researchers exemplifies this more sophisticated understanding (in contrast to the woolly "chemical imbalance" notion).

Whereas specific genetic factors may be of importance in the etiology of some, and possibly all, depressions, it is equally conceivable that early experiences of the infant or child may cause enduring biochemical changes, that may predispose some individuals to depressions in adulthood. It is not likely that changes in the metabolism of the biogenic amines alone will account for the complex phenomena of normal or pathological affect.

=== Substance abuse ===
Substance abuse, especially long-term abuse, can cause or exacerbate many mental disorders. Alcoholism is linked to depression while abuse of amphetamines and LSD can leave a person feeling paranoid and anxious.

Correlations of mental disorders with drug use include cannabis, alcohol, and caffeine. At more than 300 mg, caffeine may cause anxiety or worsen anxiety disorders. Illicit drugs can stimulate particular parts of the brain that can affect development in adolescence. Cannabis has also been found to worsen depression and lessen an individual's motivation. Alcohol has the potential to damage "white matter" in the brain that affects thinking and memory. Alcohol is a problem in many countries due to many people participating in excessive drinking or binge drinking.

=== Nutrition ===
Nutritional psychiatry is the emerging scientific field dedicated to exploring the relationship between the effects of diet and mental health. There is ongoing research about how poor diets directly influence the development of cognitive decline, as well as symptoms of psychiatric conditions, such as ADHD, depression, inflammation, anxiety, bipolar disorder, and schizophrenia. There is also research about how specific diets, those that focus on maintaining balanced nutrition, could be potential avenues for treatment of mental health conditions. A healthy diet provides the necessary micro and macronutrients that serve as the building blocks for curating stable mental health.

== Environmental factors ==
The term "environment" is very loosely defined in the context of mental illnesses. Unlike biological and psychological causes, environmental causes denote a wide range of stressors that individuals experience in everyday life. They are more psychologically than biologically based. Events that evoke feelings of loss are the most likely to cause a mental disorder to develop in an individual.

Environmental factors include but are not limited to dysfunctional home life, poor interpersonal relationships, substance abuse, not meeting social expectations, low self-esteem, and poverty. The British charity organisation Mind lists childhood abuse, trauma, violence, neglect, social isolation, discrimination, grief, stress, homelessness, social disadvantage, debt, unemployment, caring for a family member or friend, and significant trauma as an adult (such as war, an accident, or being the victim of a violent crime) as possible triggers of an episode of mental illness.

Repeating generational patterns, behaviors that are passed down through different familial generations, are also a risk factor for mental illness, especially in children.

=== Life events and emotional stress ===
Mistreatment in childhood or adulthood (including sexual-, physical-, and emotional abuse, domestic violence, and bullying) has been linked to the onset of mental disorders through an interaction of societal, familial, psychological, and biological factors. More generally, negative or stressful life events have been implicated in the development of a range of disorders, including mood and anxiety disorders.

The main risks appear to be from the accumulation of such experiences over time, although a single major trauma can sometimes lead to disorders, especially post-traumatic stress disorder. Resilience to such experiences varies; a person may be resistant to some stressors but not to others. The psychological resilience of an individual can be affected by genetics, temperamental characteristics, cognitive flexibility, coping strategies, and previous experiences. For example, in the case of bipolar disorder, stress is not a specific cause but does place genetically and biologically vulnerable people at risk for more severe forms of the illness.

=== Adverse childhood experiences ===
The Adverse Childhood Experiences Study has shown a strong dose–response relationship between adverse childhood experiences or ACEs (such as physical and/or emotional neglect, abuse, poverty, malnutrition, and traumatic experiences) and numerous health, social, and behavioral problems including suicide attempts and the frequency of depressive episodes. Several such experiences can cause toxic stress.

ACEs may affect the structural and functional development of the brain and lead to abnormalities, and chronic trauma can disrupt immune responses and cause lasting dysregulated inflammatory response. A child's neurological development can be disrupted when chronically exposed to stressful events, and his/her cognitive functioning and/or ability to cope with negative emotions can diminish. Over time, the child may adopt various harmful coping strategies that contribute to later mental and physical problems. Findings have been mixed, but some studies suggest that cognitive deficit is more related to neglect than other forms of adversity.

Poor parenting is a risk factor for depression and anxiety. Separation, grief in families, and other forms childhood trauma are risk factors for schizophrenia. Children are more susceptible to psychological harm from traumatic events than adults, but their reaction does vary by individual child, age, the type of event, and the length of exposure.

Neglect is a form of mistreatment in which the responsible caretakers fail to provide the necessary age-appropriate care, supervision, and protection. It is different from abuse in that it is, in this context, not intentional in causing harms. The long-term effects of neglect can be reduced physical, emotional, and mental health throughout the victim's life.

=== Familial and close relationships ===
Parental divorce, death, absence, or the lack of stability appears to increase the risk of mental disorders in a child. Early social privation, and the lack of "ongoing, harmonious, secure, committed" relationships have been implicated in the development of mental illnesses. Continuous conflict with friends, one's support system, and family can all increase the risk of developing a mental illness or can worsen one's mental health.

Divorce is a factor that affects adults as well as children. Divorcees may have emotional adjustment problems due to a loss of intimacy and social connections; however, new statistics show that the negative effects of divorce have been overstated.

=== Social expectations and self-esteem ===
Having both too low or too high self-esteem can be detrimental to an individual's mental health. Low self-esteem in particular can result in aggression, self-deprecating behavior, anxiety, and other mental disorders. Being perceived as someone who does not "fit in" can result in bullying and other types of emotional abuse, which can lead to the victim experiencing depression, anger, and loneliness.

=== Poverty ===
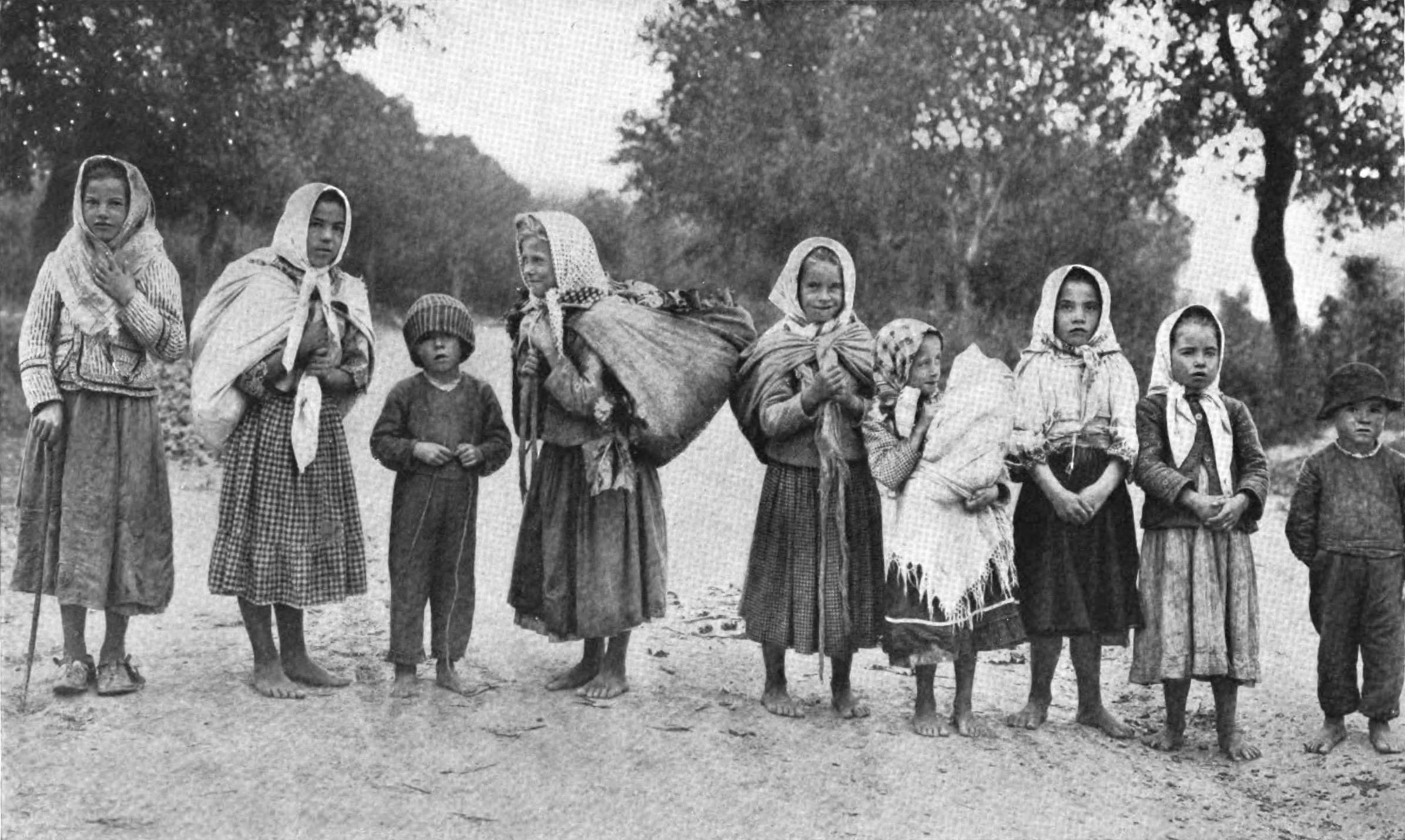
Poor Czech children in 1917.

Studies show that there is a direct correlation between poverty and mental illness: the lower the socioeconomic status of an individual, the higher the risk of mental illness. Impoverished people in England, defined as those who live in the lowest 20% income bracket, are two to three times more likely to develop mental illness than those of a higher economic class. This increased risk remains consistent for all poor individuals regardless of any in-group demographic differences, as all disadvantaged families experience economic stressors such as unemployment or lack of housing. A lower or more insecure educational, occupational, economic, or social position is generally linked to more mental disorders. Children from these backgrounds may have low levels of self-efficiency and self-worth. Studies have also shown a strong relationship between poverty and substance abuse, another risk factor in the onset of mental disorders.

Problems in one's community or culture including poverty, unemployment or underemployment, a lack of social cohesion, and migration have been associated with the development of mental disorders. Personal resources, community factors, and interactions between individual and regional-level income levels have been implicated. Socioeconomic deprivation in neighborhoods can cause worsen mental health, even after accounting for genetic factors. According to a 2009 meta-analysis by Paul and Moser, countries with high income inequality and poor unemployment protections have worse mental health outcomes among the unemployed.

The effects of different socioeconomic factors varies by country. Minority ethnic groups, including first or second-generation immigrants, are at a greater risk of developing mental disorders. This has been attributed to the insecurities in their lives and their disadvantages, including racism. There have been alternate models, such as the drift hypothesis to account for the complex relationship between an individual's social status and mental health.

== Psychological and individual factors, including resilience ==
Some clinicians believe that psychological characteristics alone determine mental disorders. Others speculate that abnormal behavior can be explained by a mix of social and psychological factors. In many examples, environmental and psychological triggers complement one another resulting in emotional stress, which in turn activates a mental illness. Each person is unique in how they will react to psychological stressors. What may break one person may have little to no effect on another. Psychological stressors, which can trigger mental illness, are as follows: emotional, physical, or sexual abuse, loss of a significant loved one, neglect, and being unable to relate to others.

The inability to relate to others is also known as emotional detachment. Emotional detachment makes it difficult for an individual to empathize with others or to share their feelings. These individuals tend to stress the importance of their independence and tend to struggle relating to others. An emotionally detached person may try to rationalize or apply logic to a situation to which there is no logical explanation. Often, the inability to relate to others stems from a traumatic event.

Mental characteristics of individuals, as assessed by both neurological and psychological studies, have been linked to the development and maintenance of mental disorders. This includes cognitive or neurocognitive factors, such as the way a person perceives, thinks, or feels about certain things; or an individual's overall personality, temperament, or coping style or the extent of protective factors or "positive illusions" such as optimism, personal control and a sense of meaning.

== See also ==
- Air pollution
- Correlates of crime
- Diseases of poverty
- Social medicine
- Winner and loser culture
