= Fenclonine =

Chemical compound

Clinical data
- Other names: CP-10188; Fenclonina; Fencloninum; NSC-77370; Parachlorophenylalanine; PCPA
- Drug class: Irreversible inhibitor of tryptophan hydroxylase, monoamine-depleting agent
- ATC code: None

Identifiers
- IUPAC name: (S)-2-Amino-3-(4-chlorophenyl)propanoic acid
- CAS Number: 7424-00-2
- PubChem CID: 4652
- IUPHAR/BPS: 5240
- ChemSpider: 4491
- UNII: R5J7E3L9SP
- KEGG: D04143
- CompTox Dashboard (EPA): DTXSID4045139
- ECHA InfoCard: 100.028.229

Chemical and physical data
- Formula: C_{9}H_{10}ClNO_{2}
- Molar mass: 199.63 g·mol^{−1}
- 3D model (JSmol): Interactive image
- Density: 1.336 g/cm^{3}
- Melting point: 240 °C (464 °F)
- Boiling point: 339.5 °C (643.1 °F)
- SMILES: Clc1ccc(cc1)CC(C(=O)O)N
- InChI: InChI=1S/C9H10ClNO2/c10-7-3-1-6(2-4-7)5-8(11)9(12)13/h1-4,8H,5,11H2,(H,12,13); Key:NIGWMJHCCYYCSF-UHFFFAOYSA-N

Fenclonine, also known as para-chlorophenylalanine (PCPA), acts as a selective and irreversible inhibitor of the tryptophan hydroxylase (TPH), which is a rate-limiting enzyme in the biosynthesis of the neurotransmitter serotonin.

It has been used experimentally to treat carcinoid syndrome, but the side effects, mostly hypersensitivity reactions and psychiatric disturbances, have prevented development for this use.

The effects of serotonin depletion from fenclonine are so drastic that serotonin cannot even be detected immunohistochemically within the first day after administration of a control dose. TPH activity can be detected neither in cell bodies or nerve terminals. After one week 10% of control values (the baseline extrapolated for the study) had replenished in the raphe nucleus, and after two weeks from initial treatment as much was again detected in the hypothalamus region. Aromatic L-amino acid decarboxylase (AADC) levels were at no time affected.

It is used in scientific research in humans and animals to investigate the effects of serotonin depletion.

== See also ==
- α-Methyl-para-tyrosine (AMPT, metirosine)
- para-Chloroamphetamine (PCA)
- Telotristat ethyl (Xermelo)
- AGN-2979
