= Shit life syndrome =

Existential crisis caused by relative poverty

Shit life syndrome (SLS) is a phrase used by physicians in the United Kingdom, the United States, and Australia to characterise a variety of disorders as being induced by a patient’s experiences of poverty or abuse.

== History ==
Sarah O'Connor's 2017 article for the Financial Times "Left behind: can anyone save the towns the economy forgot?" on shit life syndrome in the English coastal town of Blackpool won the 2018 Orwell Prize for Exposing Britain's Social Evils. O'Connor wrote that

Blackpool exports healthy skilled people and imports the unskilled, the unemployed and the unwell. As people overlooked by the modern economy wash up in a place that has also been left behind, the result is a quietly unfolding health crisis. More than a tenth of the town's working-age inhabitants live on state benefits paid to those deemed too sick to work. Antidepressant prescription rates are among the highest in the country. Life expectancy, already the lowest in England, has recently started to fall. Doctors in places such as this have a private diagnosis for what ails some of their patients: "Shit Life Syndrome" ... People with SLS really do have mental or physical health problems, doctors say. But they believe the causes are a tangled mix of economic, social and emotional problems that they — with 10- to 15-minute slots per patient — feel powerless to fix. The relationship between economics and health is blurry, complex and politically fraught. But it is too important to ignore.

— Sarah O'Connor, "Left behind: can anyone save the towns the economy forgot?", Financial Times (2017)

In a column for The Irish Times, writer John McManus questioned whether Ireland had developed shit life syndrome in the wake of a recent fall in life expectancy.

A 2018 article in The Quietus on the films of the British director Mike Leigh identified shit life syndrome in Leigh's 2002 film All or Nothing. Kinney wrote that "The film asks questions about poverty – what does poverty do to people? How do you react when the chips are down? ... The rise of populism in this country has been analysed through the lens of the 'left behind' – in a less crude way, this is exactly what All or Nothing was observing sixteen years ago."

Rosemary Rizq, in an essay in the 2016 collection The Future of Psychological Therapy, questioned the origin of the term shit life syndrome, writing that "The phrase seemed to denote a level of long-standing poverty, family breakdown, lack of stability, unemployment and potential risk factors common to many of the predominantly young, working class patients referred to the [psychotherapeutic] service" for shit is "something that we continually reject, get rid of or hide. At the same time it is something we cannot completely repudiate, it is part of us, something we need" and that the individuals with SLS have problems so "terrible, so untouchable" that they "quite literally cannot be thought about, cannot be handled by the service", yet a therapeutic organisation is "obliged to do so".

== See also ==
- Disease of despair
- Diseases of poverty
- Disability and poverty
- Social murder
