= JP-2266 =

JP-2266 is a small-molecule SGLT1/2 dual inhibitor that is designed to help patients with diabetes. It was tested as an adjunct to insulin in type 1 diabetes and also in patients with type 2 diabetes. It is reported to be a better drug candidate than sotagliflozin.
