= Social murder =

Unnatural death caused by social, political, or economic factors

Social murder (translated from the German term sozialer Mord) is a concept used to describe unnatural or premature deaths that occurs due to preventable problems in social, political, or economic systems, rather than the direct violence often associated with murder. The term originally specifically described deaths due to problems stemming from working conditions under capitalism, the term has since expanded to include preventable deaths due to systemic issues other than ones believed to be inherent under capitalism.

The term was coined by German philosopher Friedrich Engels in 1845 to describe premature, preventable deaths resulting from social and economic conditions affecting the English working class. Since then, it has been used by politicians, journalists, academics, and activists to describe deaths attributed to broader social forces or systemic conditions. The term has seen renewed use in the 21st century, particularly in discussions of disasters, public policy, healthcare, and other events in which deaths are argued to have been preventable.

== Definition ==
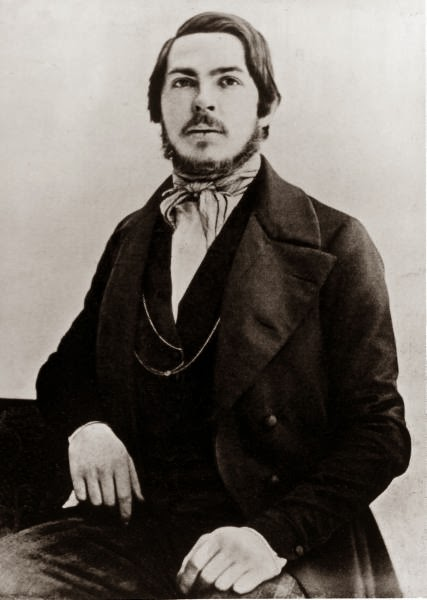
Friedrich Engels around the time his writing of The Condition of the Working-Class in England, which introduced the idea of social murder

The term "social murder" was first introduced by Friedrich Engels in his 1845 work The Condition of the Working-Class in England with regard to the living and working conditions of the Victorian era English working class. Engels contended that the conditions created by the English authorities and bourgeoisie for workers was leading to the premature death of workers, and, by doing nothing to change these conditions, the ruling class was guilty of social murder. As Engels wrote in The Condition of the Working-Class in England:

When one individual inflicts bodily injury upon another such that death results, we call the deed manslaughter; when the assailant knew in advance that the injury would be fatal, we call his deed murder. But when society places hundreds of proletarians in such a position that they inevitably meet a too early and an unnatural death, ... knows that these thousands of victims must perish, and yet permits these conditions to remain, its deed is murder just as surely as the deed of the single individual; disguised, malicious murder, murder against which none can defend himself, which does not seem what it is, because no man sees the murderer, because the death of the victim seems a natural one, since the offence is more one of omission than of commission. But murder it remains.

Engels argued these conditions were the results of inherent exploitation and pursuit of profit under the capitalist system. In his opinion, at fault was "the class which at present holds social and political control", who placed workers in a position where they came to die an early and unnatural death. In a review of academic usage of the phrase "social murder" throughout the 20th and 21st centuries, authors Stella Medvedyuk, Piara Govender, and Dennis Raphael identified four key aspects of social murder as per Engels' original definition:

1. It involves premature death due to working conditions.
2. The working conditions are themselves a consequence of exploitation under capitalism.
3. There exists a class (e.g. the bourgeoisie) that benefits from this exploitation.
4. The benefiting class is aware of the exploitation, and thus responsible for it.

In the 21st century, usage of the phrase has expanded such that it doesn't necessarily include a critique of capitalist exploitation. In the more general sense, social murder has been used to refer to excess death as a result of bad public policy.

== History ==
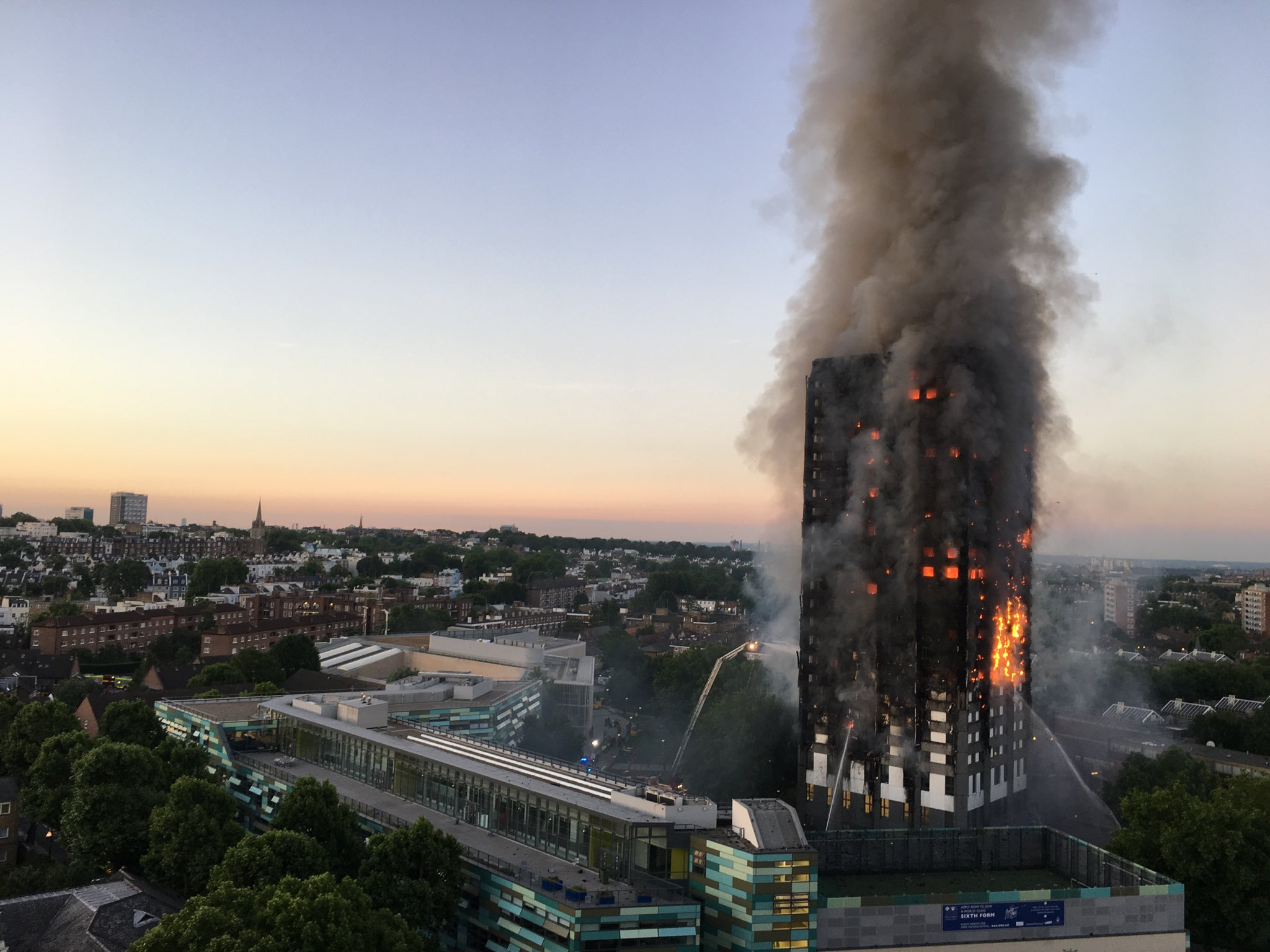
The Grenfell Tower fire is often cited as a modern example of social murder

In the 21st century, the term social murder reemerged in response to growing social and health inequalities seen around the world. For example, British Politician John McDonnell used the term to describe Conservative economic policy as well as events such as the 2017 Grenfell Tower fire. York University professor Dennis Raphael used it to describe Conservative public policy in Ontario, Canada.

Canadian economists Robert Chernomas and Ian Hudson of the University of Manitoba used the term to refer to conservative economics in their book Social Murder: And Other Shortcomings of Conservative Economics released in 2007.

In an article published in Critical Social Policy in 2018, sociologist Chris Grover of Lancaster University writes that social security austerity in Great Britain, which imposes hardships on the mental and physical well-being of working-class people, has resulted in "social murder" with increases in suicides, deaths from malnutrition, and people dying on the streets. In 2021, the BMJ executive editor Kamran Abbasi used the term to describe governmental policy which he proposed had failed to control the COVID-19 pandemic.

Since 2021, researchers Stella Medvedyuk, Piara Govender and Denis Raphael have published a series of articles arguing for the relevance of the social murder concept to contemporary society. These articles trace the use of the concept, the media's response to it, the use of the term in a cultural context, and the similarities between 1845 England and contemporary Canada.

Political scientist Marie Gottschalk of the University of Pennsylvania writes in 2025 that US corporations in the neoliberal era are committing social murder with total impunity to a much greater extent than ever before. She highlights the opioid epidemic and pharmaceutical executives responsibility for it, Wall Street firms that unleashed the Great Recession and the 2010 foreclosure crisis, and oil executives who were aware for decades that the burning of fossil fuels is responsible for climate change that as notable examples, for which there was little to no accountability.

Author and journalist Chris Hedges claims "ruling elites" are the "architects of social murder" by accelerating ecological collapse and climate change:

What is taking place is not neglect. It is not ineptitude. It is not policy failure. It is murder. It is murder because it is premeditated. It is murder because a conscious choice was made by the global ruling classes to extinguish life rather than protect it. It is murder because profit, despite the hard statistics, the growing climate disruptions and the scientific modeling, is deemed more important than human life and human survival.

In the United Kingdom, consistent cuts of healthcare and public services spending, together with a push towards privatized jobs with poor conditions, are argued to be the same kind of consequences that Engels saw in the 1840s.

During the 2024 Spanish floods, the World Socialist Web Site criticized the Spanish governments' actions, describing them as social murder.

After the December 2024 killing of UnitedHealthcare CEO Brian Thompson, an opinion piece by New York Intelligencer argued that the company's policies and practices related to denying coverage for essential medical treatments fall under the concept of social murder, also noting that it could have potentially contributed as a motive for the attack. As they put it in their piece, "UnitedHealthcare does not pull a trigger and shoot its victims in the street. Instead, they suffer and may die of cancer, or of heart disease, or of some other treatable condition".

== See also ==
- Diseases of despair
- Monopoly on violence
- Shit life syndrome

== Works cited ==
- Medvedyuk, Stella; Govender, Piara; Raphael, Dennis (1 November 2021). "The reemergence of Engels' concept of social murder in response to growing social and health inequalities". Social Science & Medicine. 289 114377. doi:10.1016/j.socscimed.2021.114377. ISSN 0277-9536. PMID 34662784.
- Sow, Marissa Jackson (1 February 2025). "Social Murder". Washington and Lee Law Review. Forthcoming. doi:10.2139/ssrn.5142005.
- Engels, Friedrich (2009) [1845]. The Condition of the Working Class in England. Cosimo, Inc. p. 95. ISBN 978-1-60520-368-3.
