= AGN-2979 =

Chemical compound

Clinical data
- ATC code: None

Identifiers
- IUPAC name: 3-(3-Dimethylaminopropyl)-3-(3-methoxyphenyl)-4,4-dimethyl-piperidine-2,6-dione
- CAS Number: 53873-21-5 103353-87-3 (HCl)
- PubChem CID: 40914
- ChemSpider: 37360
- UNII: P4HXVYBZ5F
- CompTox Dashboard (EPA): DTXSID30968644

Chemical and physical data
- Formula: C_{19}H_{28}N_{2}O_{3}
- Molar mass: 332.444 g·mol^{−1}
- 3D model (JSmol): Interactive image
- SMILES: O=C1NC(=O)CC(C1(c2cccc(OC)c2)CCCN(C)C)(C)C
- InChI: InChI=1S/C19H28N2O3/c1-18(2)13-16(22)20-17(23)19(18,10-7-11-21(3)4)14-8-6-9-15(12-14)24-5/h6,8-9,12H,7,10-11,13H2,1-5H3,(H,20,22,23); Key:UJFNSGBGJMRZKS-UHFFFAOYSA-N

AGN-2979 is a glutarimide tryptophan hydroxylase activation inhibitor. It shows antidepressant properties in rodent models of depression.
