= Diseases of poverty =

Diseases more prevalent in low-income populations

Diseases of poverty, also known as poverty-related diseases (PRDs), are diseases that are more prevalent in low-income populations. They include infectious diseases, as well as diseases related to malnutrition and poor health behaviour. Poverty is one of the major social determinants of health. The World Health Report (2002) states that diseases of poverty account for 45% of the disease burden in the countries with high poverty rate which are preventable or treatable with existing interventions. Diseases of poverty are often co-morbid and ubiquitous with malnutrition. Poverty increases the chances of having these diseases as the deprivation of shelter, safe drinking water, nutritious food, sanitation, and access to health services contributes towards poor health behaviour. At the same time, these diseases act as a barrier for economic growth to affected people and families caring for them which in turn results into increased poverty in the community. These diseases produced in part by poverty are in contrast to diseases of affluence, which are diseases thought to be a result of increasing wealth in a society.

Poverty and infectious diseases are causally related. Even before the time of vaccines and antibiotics, before 1796, it can be speculated that, leaders were adequately protected in their castles with decent food and standard accommodation, conversely, the vast majority of people were living in modest, unsanitary homes; cohabiting with their animals. During this time people were unknowingly dying of infectious diseases in an event that; they touched their sick animals, had cuts in their skins, drank something that was not boiled or ate food that was contaminated by microbes. To exacerbate the situation, epidemics known as plagues then would emerge and wipe out the whole community. During this time, people had no knowledge on infectious diseases and their causes. After speculations that their illnesses were being caused by an invisible army of tiny living beings, microorganisms, Antonie van Leeuwenhoek invented the first microscope that confirmed the existence of microorganisms that cannot be visualised with the naked eye (around the 17th century).

Human immunodeficiency virus (HIV), malaria, and tuberculosis (TB), also known as "the big three", have been acknowledged as infectious diseases that disproportionately affect developing countries. HIV is a viral illness that can be transmitted sexually, by transfusion, shared needles and during child birth from mother to child. Due to its long latent period, there is a danger of its spread without action. It affects the human body by targeting T-cells, that are responsible for protection from uncommon infections and cancers. It is managed by life prolonging drugs known as antiretroviral drugs (ARVs). TB was discovered by Robert Koch in 1882. It is characterised by fever, weight loss, poor appetite and night sweats. Throughout the years, there has been an improvement in mortality and morbidity caused by TB. This improvement has been attributed to the introduction of the TB vaccine in 1906. Despite this, each year the majority infected by TB are the poor. Finally, malaria used to be prevalent throughout the world. It is now limited to developing and warm regions; Africa, Asia, and South America.

== Contributing factors ==
The prevalence of unfavorable environmental and social factors that contribute to disease are highest among individuals living in poverty. These communities are at a higher risk of adverse health outcomes, particularly with infectious diseases and noncommunicable diseases.

=== Physical activity ===
Physical activity is a protective factor against chronic conditions such as type 2 diabetes, high blood pressure, and coronary heart disease. Lack of physical activity is related to socioeconomic status, with a higher prevalence of sedentary lifestyles among less affluent groups. There are several factors which contribute to the barriers of exercise among these groups.

Within low-income communities in the US, there is reduced access to environments that promote physical activity including parks, recreational facilities, and gyms. Only about one in five homes in low-income areas have parks within a half-mile distance, and about the same number have a fitness or recreation center within that distance. Expanded availability of local environments enabling exercise is associated with an increase in physical activity and a decrease in individuals with an overweight status.

In addition, concerns of unsafe neighborhoods in low-income areas may result in reduced physical activity in both adults and children. Children from low-income families are more likely to engage in sedentary, indoor activities due to challenges in obtaining adult supervision of outdoor play and parental concern for noise complaints. One in three children are physically active on a daily basis, and children spend seven or more hours a day is spent in front of a screen whether it be a computer, a TV, or video games. Children and adults who do not exercise frequently lower their quality of life, which will impact them as they age.

=== Mental health ===
Mental health is "a state of successful performance of mental function, resulting in productive activities, fulfilling relationships with other people, and the ability to adapt to change and to cope with adversity". Poverty has a profound effect on a person's mental health. According to Alyssa Brown of the Washington D.C. Gallup, 31% of people living in poverty have reported at some point been diagnosed with depression compared with 15.8% of those not in poverty. There is evidence that low income or loss of income are associated with worsening mental health while wealth and gain of income are linked with improvements in mental health. Furthermore, individuals living in poverty are disproportionally exposed to air pollution, temperature extremes, and violence, which all negatively impact mental health. These factors can induce chronic stress, which result in high cortisol levels. Excess cortisol is associated with unfavorable health outcomes, such as hypertension, diabetes, osteoporosis, and increased risk of infections.

It is uncertain whether poverty induces depression or depression causes poverty. What is certain is that the two are closely linked. A reason for this link could be due to the lack of support groups such as community centers. Isolation plays an integral role in depression. Results from a cohort study of approximately 2,000 older adults aged 65 years and older from the New Haven Established Populations for the Epidemiological Study of the Elderly found that social engagement was associated with lower depression scores after adjustment for various demographic characteristics, physical activity and functional status.

=== Contaminated water ===
Each year many children and adults die as a result of a lack of access to clean drinking water and poor sanitation, which enables the spread of poverty-related diseases. Contaminated water enables the spread of various waterborne-pathogens, including bacteria (E. coli, cholera), viruses (hepatitis A, norovirus), and protozoa (schistosomiasis). According to UNICEF, 3,000 children die every day, worldwide due to contaminated drinking water and poor sanitation.

Although the Millennium Development Goal (MDG) of halving the number of people who did not have access to clean water by 2015 was reached five years ahead of schedule in 2010, there are still 783 million people who rely on unimproved water sources. In 2010 the United Nations declared access to clean water a fundamental human right, integral to the achievement of other rights. This made it enforceable and justifiable to permit governments to ensure their populations access to clean water. There have been efforts to improve water quality using new technology, which allows water to be disinfected immediately upon collection and during the storage process. Clean water is necessary for cooking, cleaning, and laundry because many people come into contact with disease-causing pathogens through their food, or while bathing or washing.

Though access to water has improved for some, it continues to be especially difficult for women and children as they bear most of the burden for accessing water and supplying it to their households. In India, Sub-Saharan Africa, and parts of Latin America, women are required to travel long distances in order to access a clean water source and then bring some water home. This has a significant impact on girls' educational attainment.

An ongoing issue of contaminated water in the United States has been taking place in Flint, Michigan since 2014. The issue of lead-contaminated water began after the source of drinking water was changed from Lake Huron to the Flint River, resulting in corrosion of supply pipes and lead leaching into the city's water supply. Exposure to lead has serious health complications in developing fetuses, children, and adults. Children are particularly vulnerable to low levels of lead, and can display behavioral changes, hearing problems, and other neurologic consequences as a result of lead ingestion.

=== Air pollution ===
Studies show that there is an association between low socioeconomic status and exposure to higher concentrations of air pollution. This relationship is especially apparent in North America, New Zealand, Asia, and Africa. Exposure to environmental toxins, like ambient particulate matter (or air pollution), has been linked to the development of diseases like cancer, immune system impairment, and reproductive dysfunction.

According to the World Health Organization, 2.4 billion people are exposed to household air pollution through the use of open fire cooking and inefficient stoves. This resulted in 3.2 million deaths per year in 2020 and countless cases of stroke, heart disease, and lung cancer. Exposure to household air pollution is especially prevalent in lower-resourced areas, contributing to the high burden of air pollution-related disease in locations considered "impoverished." Women and children, especially those who bear the burden of household chores in under-resourced areas, face increased risks of household air pollution associated complications because they are the most exposed to cooking, burning, and other household pollution emitting chores.

=== Education ===
Education is affected by poverty, which is known as the income achievement gap. This gap shows that children living in poverty or have lower-income are less likely to have the cognitive development and early literacy levels of those who do not. The amount of income affects the amount of extra money a family has to spend on additional educational programs; including summer camps and out of school assistance. In addition to finances, environmental toxins, including lead and stress and lack of nutritious food can diminish cognitive development. In later education, low-income individuals or those living in poverty are more likely to dropout of school or only receive a high school diploma. The failure to achieve higher levels of education attributes to the cycle of poverty which can continue for generations in the same family and even in the community. Studies have linked adults with low educational achievement to worse general health and increases in chronic conditions and disabilities. These individuals are more likely to engage in behaviors that worsen health, such as smoke, have an unhealthy diet, and are less likely to exercise. Higher educational achievement correlates with more opportunities for secure jobs, which enables individuals to generate wealth that can be used to improve factors that impact health outcomes.

=== Sanitation and hygiene ===
Inadequate sanitation is attributed to approximately 432,000 deaths in LMIC each year. Poor sanitation can lead to diarrheal disease and malnutrition, which can result in serious illness. Globally, 2.3 billion people do not have access to basic sanitation services, which include access to unshared facilities for disposal of human waste and waste management services. These inequalities in access result in open defecation and improperly treated wastewater that is used for food production. Countries where open defecation is seen have higher levels of poverty, adverse health outcomes, and death in children due to diarrheal disease.

Further, one in four individuals lack access to a handwashing station with soap and water, thereby enabling the transmission of respiratory and diarrheal disease. In 2016, inadequate handwashing was attributed to 370,000 respiratory deaths and 165,000 diarrheal deaths. Diarrheal diseases contribute not only to the decreased health of an individual, but also to an increase in poverty. Diseases of this nature cause an inability to attend school and work, thus directly decreasing income as well as educational development. The problem of inadequate sanitation is cyclical in nature—just as it is caused by poverty, it also worsens poverty.

=== Poor nutrition ===
Malnutrition disproportionately affects those in sub-Saharan Africa. Over 35 percent of children under the age of 5 in sub-Saharan Africa show physical signs of malnutrition. Malnutrition, the immune system, and infectious diseases operate in a cyclical manner: infectious diseases have deleterious effects on nutritional status, and nutritional deficiencies can lower the strength of the immune system which affects the body's ability to resist infections. Similarly, malnutrition of both macronutrients (such as protein and energy) and micronutrients (such as iron, zinc, and vitamins) increase susceptibility to HIV infections by interfering with the immune system and promoting viral replication that contributes to greater risks of HIV transmission from mother-to-child as well as those through sexual transmission. Increased mother-to-child transmission is related to specific deficiencies in micro-nutrients such as vitamin A. Further, anemia, a decrease in the number of red blood cells, increases viral shedding in the birth canal, which also increases risk of mother-to-child transmission. Without these vital nutrients, the body lacks the defense mechanisms to resist infections. At the same time, HIV lowers the body's ability to intake essential nutrients. HIV infection can affect the production of hormones that interfere with the metabolism of carbohydrates, proteins, and fats.

In the United States, 11.1 percent of households struggle with food insecurity. Food insecurity refers to the lack of access to quality food for a healthy lifestyle. The rate of hunger and malnutrition in female headed households was three times the national average at 30.2 percent. According to the Food and Agriculture Organization of the United Nations, 10 percent of the population in Latin America and the Caribbean are affected by hunger and malnutrition.

=== Poor housing conditions ===
Families living in poverty often struggle not only with housing problems, but neighborhood safety and affordability problems as well. Avoiding neighborhood safety problems often means staying home which reduces opportunity for exercise outside the home which exacerbates health issues due to lack of exercise. Staying in the home can mean exposure to lead, mold and rodents within that home that can lead to an increased risk of illness due to these inadequate housing issues.

=== Lack of access to health services ===
According to WHO, medical strategies report, approximately 30% of the global population does not have regular access to medicines. In the poorest parts of Africa and Asia, this percent goes up to 50%. The population below the poverty line lacks access due to higher retail price and unavailability of the medicines. The higher cost can be due to the higher manufacturing price or due to local or regional tax and Value Added Tax. There is a significant disparity in the research conducted in the health sector. It is claimed that only 10% of the health research conducted globally focuses on 90% disease burden. However, diseases such as cancer, cardiovascular diseases etc. that traditionally were associated with the wealthier community are now becoming more prevalent in the poor communities as well. Hence, the research conducted now is relevant to poor population. Political priority is also one of the contributing factors of inaccessibility. The government of poor countries may allocate less funding to public health due to the scarcity of resources.

Beyond the cost of medicines, systemic issues within healthcare access contribute to disparities in disease treatment and prevention. Implementation research has shown that strategies such as mobile clinics, community-based health workers, and telemedicine have expanded healthcare coverage in underserved areas. Without these interventions, poverty-related diseases will continue to disproportionately impact low-income populations.

=== Cycle of poverty ===
The cycle of poverty is the process through which families already in poverty are likely to remain in those circumstances unless there is an intervention of some kind. This cycle of poverty has an impact on the types of diseases that are experienced by these individuals, and will often be passed down through generations. Mental illnesses are particularly important when discussing the cycle of poverty, because these mental illnesses prevent individuals from obtaining gainful employment. The stressful experience of living in poverty can also exacerbate mental illnesses.

This cycle of poverty also impacts the familial diseases that are passed down each generation. By experiencing the same stressful situations for decades, individuals become more susceptible to diseases like cardiovascular disease, obesity, diabetes, and mental illnesses including schizophrenia and bipolar disorder.

Health disparities contribute significantly to the cycle of poverty. Chronic conditions such as diabetes and hypertension reduce an individual's ability to work, further deepening economic hardship. Studies have shown that children in low-income families are at greater risk of malnutrition, which can lead to long-term cognitive and physical health issues. Addressing these health disparities requires policies that integrate healthcare, education, and economic support systems

== Infectious diseases ==
Together, diseases of poverty kill approximately 14 million people annually. Gastroenteritis with its associated diarrhea results in about 1.8 million deaths in children yearly with most of these in the world's poorest nations.

At the global level, the three primary PRDs are tuberculosis, AIDS/HIV and malaria. Developing countries account for 95% of the global AIDS prevalence and 98% of active tuberculosis infections. Furthermore, 90% of malaria deaths occur in African countries. Together, these three diseases account for 10% of global mortality.

While infectious diseases such as HIV, tuberculosis, and malaria remain significant health threats, they are not the only major health concerns for impoverished populations. Research indicates that chronic diseases are becoming increasingly prevalent in these communities due to changing lifestyles and environmental factors. Expanding healthcare interventions to address both infectious and non-communicable diseases can provide a more comprehensive approach to reducing the global disease burden.

Treatable childhood diseases are another set which have disproportionately higher rates in poor countries despite the availability of cures for decades. These include measles, pertussis and polio. The largest three PRDs—AIDS, malaria, and tuberculosis—account for 18% of diseases in poor countries. The disease burden of treatable childhood diseases in high-mortality, poor countries is 5.2% in terms of disability-adjusted life years but just 0.2% in the case of advanced countries.

In addition, infant mortality and maternal mortality are far more prevalent among the poor. For example, 98% of the 11,600 daily maternal and neonatal deaths occur in developing countries.

Three other diseases, measles, pneumonia, and diarrheal diseases, are also closely associated with poverty, and are often included with AIDS, malaria, and tuberculosis in broader definitions and discussions of diseases of poverty.

=== Neglected diseases ===
Based upon the spread of research in cures for diseases, certain diseases are identified and referred to as "neglected diseases". These include the following diseases:

- African trypanosomiasis
- Chagas disease
- Leishmaniasis
- Lymphatic filariasis
- Dracunculiasis ("Guinea worm disease")
- Onchocerciasis
- Schistosomiasis
- Trichomoniasis

Tropical diseases such as these tend to be neglected in research and development efforts. Of 1393 new drugs brought into use over a period of 25 years (1975–1999), only a total of thirteen, less than 1%, related to these diseases. Of 20 multinational drug companies surveyed for research on PRDs, only two had projects targeted towards these neglected PRDs. However, the combined total number of deaths due to these diseases is dwarfed by the enormous number of patients affected by PRDs such as respiratory infections, HIV/AIDS, diarrhea and tuberculosis, besides many others. Similar to the spread of tropical neglected diseases in developing nations, these neglected infections disproportionately affect poor and minority populations in the United States. These diseases have been identified by the Centers for Disease Control and Prevention, as priorities for public health action based on the number of people infected, the severity of the illnesses, and the ability to prevent and treat them.

=== Trichomoniasis ===
Trichomoniasis is the most common sexually transmitted infection affecting more than 200 million people worldwide. It is especially prevalent among young, poor and African American women. This infection is also common in poor communities in Sub-Saharan Africa and impoverished parts of Asia. This neglected infection is one of special concern because it is associated with a heightened risk for contracting HIV and pre-term deliveries.

In addition, availability of cures and recent advances in medicine have led to only three diseases being considered neglected diseases, namely, African trypanosomiasis, Chagas disease and Leishmaniasis.

=== Malaria ===
Africa accounts for a majority of malaria infections and deaths worldwide. Over 80 percent of the 300 to 500 million malaria infections occurring annually worldwide are in Africa. Each year, about one million children under the age of five die from malaria. Children who are poor, have mothers with little to no education, and live in rural areas are more susceptible to malaria and more likely to die from it. Malaria is directly related to the spread of HIV in sub-Saharan Africa. It increases viral load seven to ten times, which increases the chances of transmission of HIV through sexual intercourse from a patient with malaria to an uninfected partner. After the first pregnancy, HIV can also decrease the immunity to malaria. This contributes to the increase of the vulnerability to HIV and higher mortality from HIV, especially for women and infants. HIV and malaria interact in a cyclical manner—being infected with malaria increases susceptibility to HIV infection, and HIV infections increase malarial episodes. The co-existence of HIV and malaria infections helps spread both diseases, particularly in Sub-Saharan Africa. Malaria vaccines are an area of intensive research.

=== Intestinal parasites ===
Intestinal parasites are extremely prevalent in tropical areas. These include helminths like hookworms, roundworms, and flukes and protozoa like giardia, amoebas and Leishmania. They can aggravate malnutrition by depleting essential nutrients through intestinal blood loss and chronic diarrhea. Chronic worm infections can further burden the immune system. At the same time, chronic worm infections can cause immune activation that increases susceptibility of HIV infection and vulnerability to HIV replication once infected.

=== Schistosomiasis ===
Schistosomiasis (bilharzia) is a parasitic disease caused by the parasitic flatworm trematodes. Moreover, more than 80 percent of the 200 million people worldwide who have schistosomiasis live in sub-Saharan Africa. Infections often occur in contaminated water where freshwater snails release larval forms of the parasite. After penetrating the skin and eventually traveling to the intestines or the urinary tract, the parasite lays eggs and infects those organs. It damages the intestines, bladder, and other organs and can lead to anemia and protein-energy deficiency. Along with malaria, schistosomiasis is one of the most important parasitic co-factors aiding in HIV transmission. Epidemiological data shows schistosome-endemic areas coincide with areas of high HIV prevalence, suggesting that parasitic infections such as schistosomiasis increase risk of HIV transmission.

=== Tuberculosis ===
Tuberculosis is the leading cause of death around the world for an infectious disease. This disease is especially prevalent in sub-Saharan Africa, and the Latin American and Caribbean region. While the tuberculosis rate is decreasing in the rest of the world, it is increasing by rate of 6 percent per year in Sub-Saharan Africa. It is the leading cause of death for people with HIV in Africa. Tuberculosis (TB) is closely related to lifestyles of poverty, overcrowded conditions, alcoholism, stress, drug addiction and malnutrition. This disease spreads quickly among people who are undernourished. According to the Center for Disease Control and Prevention, in the United States, tuberculosis is more prevalent among foreign born persons, and ethnic minorities. The rates are especially high among Hispanics, Blacks and Asians. HIV infection and TB are also closely tied. Being infected with HIV increases the rate of activation of latent TB infections, and having TB, increases the rate of HIV replication, therefore accelerating the progression of AIDS.

=== AIDS ===
AIDS is a disease of the human immune system caused by the human immunodeficiency virus (HIV). Primary modes of HIV transmission in sub-Saharan Africa are sexual intercourse, mother-to-child transmission (vertical transmission), and through HIV-infected blood. Since rate of HIV transmission via heterosexual intercourse is so low, it is insufficient to cause AIDS disparities between countries. Critics of AIDS policies promoting safe sexual behaviors believe that these policies miss the biological mechanisms and social risk factors that contribute to the high HIV rates in poorer countries. In these developing countries, especially those in sub-Saharan Africa, certain health factors predispose the population to HIV infections.

Many of the countries in Sub-Saharan Africa are ravaged with poverty and many people live on less than one United States dollar a day. The poverty in these countries gives rise to many other factors that explain the high prevalence of AIDS. The poorest people in most African countries are malnourished, lack of access to clean water, and have improper sanitation. Because of a lack of clean water many people are plagued by intestinal parasites that significantly increase their chances of contracting HIV due to compromised immune system. Malaria, a disease still rampant in Africa also increases the risk of contracting HIV. These parasitic diseases, affect the body's immune response to HIV, making people more susceptible to contracting the disease once exposed. Genital schistosomiasis, also prevalent in the topical areas of Sub-Saharan Africa and many countries worldwide, produces genital lesions and attract CD4 cells to the genital region which promotes HIV infection. All these factors contribute to the high rate of HIV in Sub-Saharan Africa. Many of the factors seen in Africa are also present in Latin America and the Caribbean and contribute to the high rates of infections seen in those regions. In the United States, poverty is a contributing factor to HIV infections. There is also a large racial disparity, with African Americans having a significantly higher rate of infection than their white counterparts.

== Noncommunicable diseases ==
Noncommunicable diseases (NCDs) such as cardiovascular disease, chronic respiratory diseases, cancer, and diabetes place a significant and growing burden of disease in low and middle income countries (LMICs), where they have shifted from being perceived as “diseases of affluence” to key drivers of poverty cycles due to limited access and preventive care. NCDs cause 43 million deaths each year (2021 data), which account for 75% of all non-pandemic-related deaths globally, of which 73% (32 million) are in LMICs. Of the 18 million premature NCD deaths under age 70 documented in a 2021, 82% occur in LMICs, disproportionately affecting vulnerable populations and impeding poverty reduction through rising household healthcare costs.

=== Chronic diseases and poverty ===
Poverty also significantly contributes to chronic diseases, including diabetes, cardiovascular disease, and mental illness. A study by Johns Hopkins Public Health highlights that people living in poverty have a heightened risk of developing non-communicable diseases (NCDs) due to inadequate access to nutritious food, preventive medical care, and healthcare services. Recent evidence underscores bidirectional causal links between poverty and mental health disorders like depression. For instance, individuals with low income are 1.5 to 3 times more likely to develop depression and anxiety, while mental illness can trap people in poverty through reduced productivity and higher healthcare costs. In adolescents, exposure to household poverty from early school years correlates with 0.32 standard deviations higher depressive symptoms by grade 8. Poor dietary habits, increased stress, and environmental factors such as air pollution further exacerbate these health risks. Addressing these chronic illnesses is critical to understanding the full impact of poverty on health.

=== Respiratory diseases ===
More than 300 million people worldwide have asthma. The rate of asthma increases as countries become more urbanized and in many parts of the world those who develop asthma do not have access to medication and medical care. Within the United States, African Americans and Latinos are four times more likely to have severe asthma than whites. The disease is closely tied to poverty and poor living conditions. Asthma is also prevalent in children in low income countries. Homes with roaches and mice, as well as mold and mildew put children at risk for developing asthma as well as exposure to cigarette smoke.

Unlike many other Western countries, the mortality rate for asthma has steadily risen in the United States over the last two decades. Mortality rates for African American children due to asthma are also far higher than that of other racial groups. For African Americans, the rate of visits to the emergency room is 330 percent higher than their white counterparts. The hospitalization rate is 220 percent higher and the death rate is 190 percent higher. Among Hispanics, Puerto Ricans are disporpotionatly affected by asthma with a disease rate that is 113 percent higher than non-Hispanic Whites and 50 percent higher than non-Hispanic Blacks. Studies have shown that asthma morbidity and mortality are concentrated in inner city neighborhoods characterized by poverty and large minority populations and this affects both genders at all ages. Asthma continues to have an adverse effects on the health of the poor and school attendance rates among poor children. 10.5 million days of school are missed each year due to asthma.

=== Cardiovascular disease ===
Though heart disease is not exclusive to the poor, there are aspects of a life of poverty that contribute to its development. This category includes coronary heart disease, stroke and heart attack. Heart disease is the leading cause of death worldwide and there are disparities of morbidity between the rich and poor. Studies from around the world link heart disease to poverty. Low neighborhood income and education were associated with higher risk factors. Poor diet, lack of exercise and limited (or no) access to a specialist were all factors related to poverty, thought to contribute to heart disease. Both low income and low education were predictors of coronary heart disease, a subset of cardiovascular disease. Of those admitted to hospital in the United States for heart failure, women and African Americans were more likely to reside in lower income neighborhoods. In the developing world, there is a 10 fold increase in cardiac events in the black and urban populations.

=== Cancer ===
While cancer affects all populations, certain populations are disproportionally affected by the disease due to differences in risk factor exposures. People living in poverty are at an increased risk of cancer incidence and mortality, with annual death rates being 12% higher in countries living in poverty. Globally, two out of three cancer deaths are attributed to lifestyle and behaviors such as smoking, poor diet, physical inactivity, and insufficient cancer screenings. Breast Cancer is a commonly found in woman who are exposed to fine-air pollution and particles, which can be found and stimulated from a dirty environment. Individuals living in LMIC have greater exposure to these risk factors in the setting of reduced access to health care services. Inadequate access to health care presents a major barrier as individuals are less likely to receive regular cancer screenings resulting in a late-stage diagnosis, which is associated with worse health outcomes. People living in poverty have also higher levels of chronic stress, which also increases an individual's risk of cancer due to inflammatory changes.

=== Obesity ===
Obesity is a chronic non-communicable disease (NCD) that is diagnosed in individuals who have a body mass index (BMI) greater than 30 kg/m^{2}. Generally, low-income populations, whether they live in high-income countries or in low-middle income countries (LMIC) suffer higher disease burden for chronic conditions including obesity when compared to their higher income counterparts. Higher obesity rates tend to be observed in LMICs and it has been believed that lower socioeconomic statuses (SES) leads to higher obesity rates because individuals living in poverty are limited in their abilities to engage in healthy exercising and dieting practices. In the United States, there tends to be higher obesity rates in lower SES neighborhoods, which are called food deserts. A food desert lacks supermarkets that offer healthy and fresh food options and instead have highly processed foods. Because of the limited access to healthy foods, it follows that individuals who live farther away from supermarkets tend to have higher rates of obesity. Besides food access, individuals living in poverty may also be limited in their healthcare access, leading to later diagnosis and management of chronic conditions like obesity. Conversely, chronic conditions such as obesity can also increase rates of poverty via increased healthcare expenditures, wage loss during peak productive years, and missed schooling. These points underscore the positive effect poverty alleviation has on improving health outcomes as it concerns obesity and other chronic NCDs. In spite of this data, pervasive attitudes remain that individual behavior, not SES, is responsible for obesity. These attitudes stigmatize individuals with obesity, which further hampers public health interventions to reduce obesity rates and accelerates health disparities along SES lines. This stigma extends to other NCDs, including mental health conditions, where societal biases delay treatment and exacerbate isolation in low-resource settings.

=== Social and economic determinants of health ===
Poverty related diseases are not just biological but are deeply influenced by social and economic conditions. According to the Centers for Disease Control and Prevention (CDC), factors such as income security, stable housing, education, and employment opportunities play a critical role in determining health outcomes. Individuals in poverty often live in environments with higher exposure to pollutants, limited access to fresh food, and higher stress levels, all of which contribute to poor health. Socioeconomic disparities persist even in high income areas. For example, 2025 surveillance in France revealed persistent TB hotspots in low SES urban areas of metropolitan regions, with area-level variables like unemployment and housing instability associated with 1.5 to 2 times higher notification rates illustrating how poverty amplifies both communicable and non-communicable disease risks through shared structural drivers.

=== Healthcare access and policy solutions ===
Access to healthcare remains a crucial determinant of health outcomes for individuals in poverty. Research demonstrates that healthcare system improvements in low- and middle-income countries (LMICs) can significantly reduce the burden of poverty-related diseases. However, many impoverished communities continue to face barriers such as high medical costs, lack of healthcare infrastructure, and limited insurance coverage. Implementing policies that prioritize equitable healthcare access, such as universal health coverage and community health programs, can help mitigate these disparities. To address NCD inequities, governments should invest in user-centered health systems, including affordable interventions for behavioral risk factors, e.g. tobacco control, and early detection as recommended by global frameworks like the WHO’s 2025 equity report.

== Other health complications ==
=== Maternal health ===
Obstetric fistula or vaginal fistula is a medical condition in which a fistula (hole) develops between either the rectum and vagina (see rectovaginal fistula) or between the bladder and vagina (see vesicovaginal fistula) after severe or failed childbirth, when adequate medical care is not available. It is considered a disease of poverty because of its tendency to occur women in poor countries who do not have health resources comparable to developed nations.

=== Dental decay ===
Dental decay or dental caries is the gradual destruction of tooth enamel. Poverty is a significant determinant for oral health. Dental caries is one of the most common chronic diseases worldwide. In the United States it is the most common chronic disease of childhood. Risk factors for dental caries includes living in poverty, poor education, low socioeconomic status, being part of an ethnic minority group, having a developmental disability, recent immigrants and people infected with HIV/AIDS. In Peru, poverty was found to be positively correlated with dental caries among children. According to a report by U.S. health surveillance, tooth decay peaks earlier in life and is more severe in children with families living below the poverty line. Tooth decay is also strongly linked to dietary behaviors, and in poor rural areas where nutrient dense foods, fruits and vegetables are unavailable, the consumption of sugary and fatty food increases the risk of dental decay. Because the mouth is a gateway to the respiratory and digestive tracts, oral health has a significant impact on other health outcomes. Gum disease has been linked to diseases such as cardiovascular disease.

== Societal consequences ==
Diseases of poverty reflect the dynamic relationship between poverty and poor health; while such diseases result directly from poverty, they also perpetuate and deepen impoverishment by sapping personal and national health and financial resources. For example, malaria decreases GDP growth by up to 1.3% in some developing nations, and by killing tens of millions in sub-Saharan Africa, AIDS alone threatens "the economies, social structures, and political stability of entire societies".

=== For women ===
Women and children are often put at a high risk of being infected by schistosomiasis, which in turn puts them at a higher risk of acquiring HIV. Since the mode of schistosomiasis transmission is usually through contaminated water in streams and lakes, women and children who do their household chores by the water are more likely to acquire the disease. Activities that women and children often do around waterfront include washing clothes, collecting water, bathing, and swimming. Women who have schistosomiasis lesions are three times more likely to be infected with HIV.

Women also have a higher risk of HIV transmission through the use of medical equipment such as needles. Because more women than men use health services, especially during pregnancy, they are more likely to come across unsterilized needles for injections. Although statistics estimate that unsterilized needles only account for 5 to 10 percent of primary HIV infections, studies show this mode of HIV transmission may be higher than reported. This increased risk of contracting HIV through non-sexual means has social consequences for women as well. Over half of the husbands of HIV-positive women in Africa tested HIV-negative. When HIV-positive women reveal their HIV status to their HIV-negative husbands, they are often accused of infidelity and face violence and abandonment from their family and community.

=== Relating to human capabilities ===
Malnutrition associated with HIV impacts people's ability to provide for themselves and their dependents, thus limiting the human capabilities of both themselves and their dependents. HIV can negatively affect work output, which impacts the ability to generate income. This is crucial in parts of Africa where farming is the primary occupation and obtaining food is dependent on the agricultural outcome. Without adequate food production, malnutrition becomes more prevalent. Children are often collateral damage in the AIDS crisis. As dependents, they can be burdened by the illness and eventual death of one or both parents due to HIV/AIDS. Studies have shown that orphaned children are more likely to display physical symptoms of malnutrition than children whose parents are both alive.

== Public policy proposals ==
There are a number of proposals for reducing the diseases of poverty and eliminating health disparities within and between countries. The World Health Organization proposes closing the gaps by acting on social determinants. Their first recommendation is to improve daily living conditions. This area involves improving the lives of women and girls so that their children are born in healthy environments and placing an emphasis on early childhood health. Their second recommendation is to tackle the inequitable distribution of money, power and resources. This would involve building stronger public sectors and changing the way in which society is organized. Their third recommendation is to measure and understand the problem and assess the impact of action. This would involve training policy makers and healthcare practitioners to recognize problems and form policy solutions.

=== Health in All Policies ===
The 8th Global Conference on Health Promotion held in Helsinki in June 2013 has proposed an approach termed Health in All Policies. Health inequalities are shaped by many powerful forces and social, political, and economic determinants. Governments have a responsibility to ensure that their people are able to live healthy lives and have equitable access to achieving a reasonable state of good health. Policies that governments craft and implement in all sectors have a significant and ongoing impact on public health, health equity, and the lives of their citizens. Increases in technology, medical innovation, and living conditions have led to the disappearance of diseases and other factors contributing to poor health. However, there are many diseases of poverty that still persist in developed and developing countries. Tackling these health inequalities and diseases of poverty requires a willingness to engage the whole government in health. The Helsinki Statement lays out a framework of action for countries and calls on governments to make a commitment to building health equity within their country.

Health in All Policies (HiAP) is an approach to public policies across all sectors of government that takes into account the health implications of all government and policy decisions to improve health equity across all populations residing within the borders of a country. This concept is built upon principles in line with the Universal Declaration of Human Rights, The United Nations Millennium Development Declaration, and principles of good governance: legitimacy given by national and international law, accountability of government, transparency of policy making, participation of citizens, sustainability ensuring policies meet the needs of both present and future generations, and collaboration across sectors and levels of government.

Finally the Framework lists and expands upon six steps for implementation that may be undertaken by a country in taking action towards Health in All Policies. These are components of action and not a rigid checklist of steps to adhere to. The most important aspect of this policy is that governments should adapt the policy to suit the needs of their citizens, their socioeconomic situation, and their governance system.

1. Establish the need and priorities for HiAP
2. Frame planned action
3. Identify supportive structures and processes
4. Facilitate assessment and engagement
5. Ensure monitoring, evaluation, and reporting
6. Build capacity.

=== HIV/AIDS policy ===
- Nutrition Supplements: Focusing on reversing the pattern of malnutrition in sub-Saharan African and other poor countries is a one possible way of decreasing susceptibility to HIV infections. Micro-nutrients such as iron and vitamin A can be delivered and provided at a very low cost. For example, vitamin A supplements cost $0.02 per capsule if provided twice a year. Iron supplements per child cost $0.02 if provided weekly or $0.08 if provided daily.
- Eliminating Co-factors: Tackling the very diseases that increase risk of HIV infections can help slow down the rates of HIV transmission. Co-factors such as malaria and parasitic infections can be combated in an effective and cost-efficient manner. For example, mosquito nets can be easily used to prevent malaria. Parasites can be eliminated with medication that is cost-effective and easy to administer. Twice-yearly treatments range from $0.02 to $0.25 depending on the type of worm.

== See also ==
- Diseases of despair
- Effects of poverty on mental health
- Health equity
- Hygiene hypothesis
- Inequality in disease
- Shit life syndrome
- Social determinants of health
- Social determinants of obesity
- Social epidemiology
- Typhus § History
- Unnatural Causes: Is Inequality Making Us Sick?
