= Rs1800532 =

SNP: rs1800532
- Name(s): A218C
- Gene: TPH1
- Chromosome: 11
- Region: Intron 7

External databases
- Ensembl: Human SNPView
- dbSNP: 1800532
- HapMap: 1800532
- SNPedia: 1800532

In genetics, rs1800532 (A218C) is a genetic variant. It is a single nucleotide polymorphism in the TPH1 gene and located in intron 7.

It has been examined in relation to personality traits.

A779C is another SNP in same intron.
