= Disease of despair =

Classes of medical conditions

External videos
- Krystal and Saagar: New Study Shows Deaths Of Despair Hitting Poor Working Class Of ALL Races on YouTube

A disease of despair is one of three classes of behavior-related medical conditions that increase in groups of people who experience despair due to a sense that their long-term social and economic prospects are bleak. The three disease types are drug overdose (including alcohol overdose), suicide, and alcoholic liver disease.

In 2017, diseases of despair, and the resulting deaths of despair, were high in the Appalachian region of the United States, especially in Pennsylvania, West Virginia, and Delaware. The prevalence increased markedly during the first decades of the 21st century, especially among middle-aged and older working class White Americans starting in 2010, followed by an increase in mortality for Hispanic Americans in 2011 and African Americans in 2014. It gained media attention because of its connection to the opioid epidemic. In 2018, some 158,000 people in the United States died from these causes, compared to 65,000 in 1995. The economists Anne Case and Angus Deaton attribute this rising mortality to the flaws in contemporary capitalism.

Deaths of despair have increased sharply during the COVID-19 pandemic and associated recession, with a 10% to 60% increase above pre-pandemic levels. Life expectancy in the United States declined further to 76.4 years in 2021, with the main drivers being the COVID-19 pandemic, along with deaths from drug overdoses, suicides and liver disease.

== Definitions ==
Despair often breeds disease.

— Sophocles

The concept of despair in any form can affect an individual person, and arise in and spread through social communities.

There are four basic types of despair. Cognitive despair denotes thoughts connected to defeat, guilt, hopelessness and pessimism. It may make a person perceive other people's actions as hostile and discount the value of long-term outcomes. Emotional despair refers to feelings of sadness, irritability, loneliness and apathy and may partly impede the process of creating and nourishing interpersonal relationships. The term behavioural despair describes risky, reckless and self-destructive acts reflecting little to no consideration of the future, such as self-harm, reckless driving, drug use, risky sexual behaviours and others. Biological despair relates to dysfunction or dysregulation of the body's stress reactive system and/or to hormonal instability.

Being under the influence of despair for an extended amount of time may lead to the development of one or more of the diseases of despair, such as suicidal thoughts or drug and alcohol abuse. If an individual has a disease of despair, there is an increased risk of death of despair, usually classified as a suicide, drug or alcohol overdose, or liver failure.

== Risk factors ==
Unstable mental health, depression, suicidal thoughts and addiction to drugs and alcohol affect people of every age, every ethnicity, and every demographic group in every country in the world.

=== United States ===
In 2017, these problems were on the rise, especially among the US White non-Hispanic men and women in midlife. Since the beginning of the millennium, this particular group of people is the single one in the world which experienced continual increase in mortality and morbidity while US Black non-Hispanics and US Hispanics, as well as all subgroups of populations in other rich countries (such as countries from the EU, Japan, Australia and others), show the exact opposite trend. Men and women having no more than high school education and those living in rural areas are more affected by this phenomenon than their peers who are college-educated and live in urban areas.

==== African Americans ====
In 2024, UCLA researchers Joseph Friedman and Helena Hansen stated that African-American deaths of despair are extensive—and have been ignored by policy makers, the medical establishment, and the media. Friedman and Hansen cited African Americans' relatively low life expectancy, and the high rate of African-American drug overdose deaths.

==== Native Americans ====
In 2024, UCLA researchers Joseph Friedman and Helena Hansen found that rates of "mid life mortality from deaths of despair" among Native American and Native Alaskans individuals was significantly higher than that among White individuals from 1999 to 2022. In 2022, the Native American midlife death rate was 241.70 per 100,000 people, 2.36 times the rate among white individuals.

In 2022, Native Americans had a drug overdose rate of 104.95 per 100,000 people. This is in comparison to the 2022 Black rate of 84.80 overdoses per 100,000, and the White rate of 59.26 per 100,000.

In 2022, the Native American mid life rate of alcoholic liver disease was 108.83 per 100,000 people. This was more than six times the White rate, at 17.92 per 100,000.

==== Hispanic Americans ====
In 2024, UCLA researchers Joseph Friedman and Helena Hansen stated that deaths of despair amongst Latinos in 2022, were catching up to the higher White and Black rates of deaths of despair.

== History ==
Mortality and morbidity rates in the United States have been decreasing for decades. Between 1970 and 2013, mortality rates for middle-aged Americans fell by 44% and morbidity was on a decline even among the elderly. After 1998, mortality rates in other rich countries have been declining by 2% a year. Midlife mortality fell by more than 200 per 100,000 for Black non-Hispanics and by more than 60 per 100,000 for Hispanics during the 1998–2013 period.

The AIDS epidemic in the US was brought under control. In 2018, 37,968 people received an HIV diagnosis in the US and its 6 dependent areas, which is an overall 7% decrease compared with the year 2014. In 2017, cardiovascular disease and cancer, the two biggest killers in middle age, were on a decline, even though escalating obesity remained uncontrolled. Despite all of these satisfactory numbers, the White non-Hispanic population exhibited an increase in premature deaths, especially in those caused by suicide, drug overdose and alcoholic liver disease.

There were two main factors driving this trend. The 2017 data showed that the US White non-Hispanic population significantly differed from populations in other countries. For example, in 2015, drug, alcohol and suicide mortality was more than two times higher among US White non-Hispanics, in comparison to people from the United Kingdom, Sweden or Australia. In comparison to US Black non-Hispanics, the mortality and morbidity rates were lower. In 2017, the gap between these groups was narrowing quickly. For people aged 30–34, the difference between these two ethnicities was almost completely diminished.

In 2015, White non-Hispanics aged 50–54 with no more than a high school diploma had almost 1,000 premature deaths per 100,000. The average for all White non-Hispanics regardless of their education was around 500 deaths per 100,000. Therefore, education probably negatively correlates with the probability of developing a disease of despair. That means higher education correlates with lower probability of developing a disease of despair.

Secondly, the excess premature deaths are, as stated above, caused primarily by suicide, poisonings or drug overdoses and other causes connected especially to alcoholism such as chronic liver diseases. The proportion of these causes of death (in comparison to deaths caused by assaults, cancer, cardiovascular diseases, HIV and motor vehicle crashes) in population white non-Hispanic people aged 25–44 is increased by 210%. It is also worth noting that the highest rates are to be discovered among people living in rural areas. For example, during the years 1999–2015, the rate of deaths of despair increased twice as much as the rate of other causes of deaths in the population of White non-Hispanics aged 30–44 living in rural areas. In total, death rates in rural subpopulations for all ethnicities increased among those aged 25–64 years by 6%. As a result of these findings, it is possible to assume that living in rural areas is also connected to the diseases and deaths of despair.

In 2022, US suicides reached record levels, with 49,369 suicide deaths. Since 2011, roughly 540,000 people have died by suicide in the United States.

In 2010, life expectancy for working class Americans without a college degree peaked and has been declining since, with adult life expectancy after the age of 25 being another 49.8 years, down from 51.6 in 1992. Anne Case and Angus Deaton attribute this trend in part to rising deaths of despair.

== Causes ==
Our account echoes the account of suicide by Emile Durkheim, the founder of sociology, of how suicide happens when society fails to provide some of its members with the framework within which they can live dignified and meaningful lives.

— Anne Case and Angus Deaton, Deaths of Despair and the Future of Capitalism (2020)

The factors that seem to exacerbate diseases of despair are not fully known, but they are generally recognized as including a worsening of economic inequality and feeling of hopelessness about personal financial success. This can take many forms and appear in different situations. For example, people feel inadequate and disadvantaged when products are marketed to them as being important, but these products repeatedly prove to be unaffordable for them.

This increase in rates of mental distress and diseases of despair have been attributed to the flaws in contemporary capitalism and policies associated with the ideology of neoliberalism, which seeks to release markets from all restrictions and reduce or eliminate government assistance programs. The overall loss of employment in affected geographic regions, and stagnant wages and deteriorating working conditions along with the decline of labor unions and the welfare state, are widely hypothesized factors. As such, some scholars have characterized deaths of despair as driven by austerity policies and privatization as "social murder".

The changes in the labor market also affect social connections that might otherwise provide protection, as people at risk for this problem are less likely to get married, more likely to get divorced, and more likely to experience social isolation. However, some experts claim the correlation between income and mortality/morbidity rate is only coincidental and may not be associated with deaths for all groups. In 2017, Anne Case and Angus Deaton argued that "after 1999, blacks with a college education experienced even more severe percentage declines in income than did whites in the same education group. Yet black mortality rates have fallen steadily, at rates between 2 and 3 percent per year for all age groups." Other examples from Europe show that decreased incomes and/or increased unemployment do not, in general, correlate with increased mortality rates.

Case and Deaton argue that the ultimate cause, is people's sense that life is meaningless, unsatisfying, or unfulfilling, rather than strictly the basic economic security that makes these higher order feelings more likely. In their 2020 book, Case and Deaton assert that in the United States, much more so than in peer countries such as those of Western Europe, globalization and technological advancement dramatically shifted political power towards capital, and away from labor, by empowering corporations and weakening labor unions. As such, other rich countries, while facing challenges associated with globalization and technological change, did not experience a "long-term stagnation of wages, nor an epidemic of deaths of despair." In addition, Marie Gottschalk notes that, following the September 11th attacks, the state prioritized "forever wars" which plundered working class communities of vital resources that resulted in an "alarming erosion in the quality of life for so many people, and the surge in various forms of violence in rural America and across the country."

2018 data shows that diseases of despair pose a complex threat to modern society and that they are not correlated only to the economic strength of an individual. Social connections, level of education, place of residence, medical condition, mental health, working opportunities, subjective perception of one's own future – all of these play a role in determining whether the individual will develop diseases of despair or not. Additionally, the younger generations are more and more influenced by social media and other modern technologies, which may have unexpected and unfavourable effects on their lives as well. For example, a 2016 study stated that the use of social media "was significantly associated with increased depression."

== COVID-19 pandemic ==
Preliminary studies indicate an aggravation of depression, anxiety, drug overdoses, and suicidal ideation following the beginning of the COVID-19 pandemic. Though health aspects like stress can be concurrent with the crisis, other biopsychosocial risk factors such as job loss, housing precarity, and food insecurity can manifest over time. This range of social determinants, commonly experienced during an economic downturn, can induce and aggravate a sense of despair. Loneliness, which is associated with despair, was also aggravated by social isolation practices put in place during the COVID-19 pandemic, which may contribute to a rise in diseases of despair.

A 2022 preliminary review of 70 published studies conducted in 17 countries concerning the potential impacts of COVID-19 on deaths of despair, indicates that women, ethnic minorities and younger age groups, may have suffered disproportionately more than other groups.

=== Drug overdoses ===
Fentanyl. 2 mg (white powder to the right) is a lethal dose in most people. US penny is 19 mm (0.75 in) wide.

In 2021, preliminary indications in Canada and the United States demonstrated that the trajectory of drug overdose-related deaths was exacerbated by the COVID-19 pandemic. In Canada, drug overdose-related deaths stabilized prior to the onset of COVID-19, but increased after the onset of COVID-19. In the United States, drug overdose-related deaths increased prior to and accelerated after the onset of COVID-19.

More specifically, it was found that the pandemic had remarkably escalated the opioid overdose crisis in Milwaukee County, Wisconsin. The worst of the drug impacts seemed to primarily occur in poor, urban, ethnic minority neighborhoods, though even wealthy and prosperous White communities within the suburbs saw a similar, though reduced, impact.

=== Impact on Wisconsin opioid crisis ===
The idea of the use of opioids for recreation or self-medicating purposes has given way to the idea of an opioid crisis within the last two decades, and particularly since 2010. This is primarily because the introduction of synthetic opioids has caused a doubling of the annual number of deaths from overdose in the decade from 2010 and 2019 within the USA. One study done in Milwaukee county, Michigan, found that monthly overdose deaths increased by 12 during the COVID-19 pandemic, primarily among urban, poor, Black and Latino neighborhoods. White neighborhoods saw a lower increase.

== Contrasted with diseases of poverty ==
Diseases of despair differ from diseases of poverty because poverty itself is not the central factor. Groups of impoverished people with a sense that their lives or their children's lives will improve are not affected as much by diseases of despair. Instead, this affects people who have little reason to believe that the future will be better. As a result, this problem is distributed unevenly, for example by affecting working-class people in the United States more than working-class people in Europe, even when the European economy was weaker. It also affects White people more than racially disadvantaged groups, possibly because working-class White people are more likely to believe that they are not doing better than their parents did, while non-White people in similar economic situations are more likely to believe that they are better off than their parents.

== Effects ==
Starting in 1998, a rise in deaths of despair has resulted in an unexpected increase in the number of middle-aged White Americans dying (the age-specific mortality rate). By 2014, the increasing number of deaths of despair had resulted in a drop in overall life expectancy. Anne Case and Angus Deaton propose that the increase in mid-life mortality is the result of cumulative disadvantages that have occurred over decades, and that solving it will require patience and perseverance for many years, rather than a quick fix that produces immediate results. The number of deaths of despair in the United States has been estimated at 150,000 per year in 2017.

Even though the main cause of diseases of despair may not be purely economical, the consequences of this phenomenon are, in terms of money, expensive. According to a report from 2016, alcohol misuse, misuse of illegal drugs and non-prescribed medications, treatment of associated disorders and lost productivity cost the US more than $400 billion every year. About 40 percent of those costs were paid by government, which implies a huge cost of alcohol and drug misuse to taxpayers. Another study claims even higher costs of around $1.5 trillion in economic loss, loss of productivity, and societal harm.

== Terminology ==
The phrase diseases of despair has been criticized for medicalizing problems that are primarily social and economic, and for underplaying the role of specific drugs, such as OxyContin, in increasing deaths. While the disease model of addiction has a strong body of empirical support, there is weak evidence for biological markers of suicidal thoughts and behaviors and no evidence that suicide fits a disease model. The use of the phrase diseases of despair to describe suicide in medical literature is more reflective of the medical model than suicidal thoughts and behaviors.

== See also ==
- Alcohol abuse
- Anhedonia
- Causes of mental disorders
- Depression (mood)
- Diseases of affluence
- Diseases of poverty
- Social murder
- Major depressive disorder
- Sadness
- Substance abuse
- Suicidal behavior
