= Rs1799913 =

SNP: rs1799913
- Name(s): A779C
- Gene: TPH1
- Chromosome: 11
- Region: Intron 7

External databases
- Ensembl: Human SNPView
- dbSNP: 1799913
- HapMap: 1799913
- SNPedia: 1799913
- SzGene: Meta-analysis; Overview

In genetics, rs1799913, also called A779C, is a gene variation—a single nucleotide polymorphism (SNP)— in the TPH1 gene. It is located in intron 7.

The SNP association with schizophrenia has been examined in several studies, though as of 2007 with no definitive conclusion.

One study has found that the SNP may be associated with heroin addiction. Other study relate it to figural and numeric creativity.

A218C (rs1800532) is another SNP in the same intron in the same gene.
