= TPH2 =

Protein-coding gene in the species Homo sapiens

Identifiers
- Aliases: TPH2, ADHD7, NTPH, tryptophan hydroxylase 2
- External IDs: OMIM: 607478; MGI: 2651811; GeneCards: TPH2
Available structures
PDB	Ortholog search: PDBe RCSB
PDB	List of PDB id codes 4V06
Enzyme activity
EC #	BRENDA	ExPASy	KEGG	MetaCyc
1.14.16.4	↗	↗	↗	↗

Gene location (Human)
Chr.	Chromosome 12 (human)
Band	12q21.1	Start	71,938,845 bp
Band	12q21.1	End	72,186,618 bp

Gene location (Mouse)
Chr.	Chromosome 10 (mouse)
Band	10|10 D2	Start	114,914,546 bp
Band	10|10 D2	End	115,020,927 bp
RNA expression pattern
Bgee	Human / Mouse (ortholog); Top expressed in: secondary oocyte; testicle; gonad; superior vestibular nucleus; islet of Langerhans; sural nerve; prefrontal cortex; anterior pituitary; white blood cell; monocyte / Top expressed in: dorsal tegmental nucleus; central gray substance of midbrain; zygote; secondary oocyte; primary oocyte; embryo; enteric nervous system; sensory ganglion; trigeminal ganglion; pontine nuclei; More reference expression data
BioGPS	n/a
Gene ontology
Molecular function	iron ion binding; metal ion binding; monooxygenase activity; tryptophan 5-monooxygenase activity; oxidoreductase activity, acting on paired donors, with incorporation or reduction of molecular oxygen, reduced pteridine as one donor, and incorporation of one atom of oxygen; oxidoreductase activity
Cellular component	cytosol; neuron projection
Biological process	cellular response to lithium ion; response to glucocorticoid; response to activity; serotonin biosynthetic process; response to estrogen; response to calcium ion; aromatic amino acid family metabolic process; response to nutrient levels; circadian rhythm; indolalkylamine biosynthetic process
Sources:Amigo / QuickGO
Orthologs
Databases	NCBI: entry; OMA: entry
Species	Human	Mouse
Entrez	121278	216343
Ensembl	ENSG00000139287	ENSMUSG00000006764
UniProt	Q8IWU9	Q8CGV2
RefSeq (mRNA)	NM_173353	NM_173391
RefSeq (protein)	NP_775489	NP_775567
Location (UCSC)	Chr 12: 71.94 – 72.19 Mb	Chr 10: 114.91 – 115.02 Mb
PubMed search
- Wikidata
View/Edit Human	View/Edit Mouse

Tryptophan hydroxylase 2 (TPH2) is an isozyme of tryptophan hydroxylase found in vertebrates. In humans, TPH2 is primarily expressed in the serotonergic neurons of the brain, with the highest expression in the raphe nucleus of the midbrain. Until the discovery of TPH2 in 2003, serotonin levels in the central nervous system were believed to be regulated by serotonin synthesis in peripheral tissues, in which tryptophan hydroxylase is the dominant form.

== Function ==
Tryptophan hydroxylase (TPH; EC 1.14.16.4) is the rate-limiting enzyme in the synthesis of serotonin (5-hydroxytryptamine, or 5HT). 5HT is causally involved in numerous central nervous activities, and it has several functions in peripheral tissues, including the maintenance of vascular tone and gut motility.[supplied by OMIM]

Disabling this enzyme with drugs (especially p-chlorophenylalanine aka PCPA or Fenclonine) has allowed researchers to investigate the effects of very low serotonin levels on humans and others animals, and by extension, gain insights into the functions of serotonin systems more broadly (such as hypersexuality as well as increased social aggression in rodents and hypersexuality cats following PCPA administration). In rat brain, administration of a single PCPA injection resulted in the lowest level of serotonin production occurring on day 2 and returning to control values on day 7. Drugs such as MDMA and methamphetamine have been shown to lower levels of this enzyme which may result in periods of low serotonin levels following drug use. In a study investigating the effects of Fenclonine on humans, the greatly lowered serotonin levels were associated with "fatigue, dizziness, nausea, uneasiness [anxiety], fullness in the head [a feeling of pressure in the head] paresthesias [a pricking, pins-and-needles, burning, and/or aching sensation--typically the limbs], headache, and constipation".

== See also ==
- Tryptophan hydroxylase
- TPH1
