= Lexicon Pharmaceuticals =

American pharmaceutical company

Lexicon Pharmaceuticals, Inc.
- Type: Public
- Traded as: Nasdaq: LXRX; Russell 2000 Component
- Industry: Pharmaceutical
- Founded: 1995; 31 years ago, in The Woodlands, Texas
- Headquarters: The Woodlands, Texas, U.S.
- Key people: Mike Exton, Chief Executive Officer and Director; Brian P. Zambrowicz, EVP & Chief Scientific Officer; Jeffrey L. Wade, EVP of Corporate Development & Chief Scientific Officer; Alan J. Main, EVP of Pharmaceutical Research; Pablo Lapuerta, EVP of Clinical Development & Chief Medical Officer; James F. Tessmer, VP of Finance and Accounting
- Revenue: ▲$324.1 Million(2019)
- Number of employees: 225 (2011)
- Website: lexpharma.com

Lexicon Pharmaceuticals, Inc. is a biopharmaceutical company developing treatments for human disease. The company was founded in 1995 in The Woodlands, Texas under the name Lexicon Genetics, Incorporated by co-founders Professor Allan Bradley, FRS and Professor Bradley's postdoctoral fellow Arthur T Sands. The company has used its mouse gene knockout technology and in vivo screening capabilities to study nearly 5,000 genes in its Genome5000 program and has identified over 100 potential therapeutic targets. Lexicon has advanced multiple drug candidates into human clinical trials and has a broad and diverse pipeline of drug targets behind its clinical programs. Lexicon is pursuing drug targets in five therapeutic areas including oncology, gastroenterology, immunology, metabolism, and ophthalmology.

The company's clinical drug candidates include sotagliflozin (LX4211) for the treatment of type 2 diabetes; LX1033 for the treatment of irritable bowel syndrome and other gastrointestinal disorders; telotristat ethyl (LX1032) for the treatment of the symptoms associated with carcinoid syndrome; and LX2931 for the treatment of autoimmune diseases, such as rheumatoid arthritis.

== Company history ==
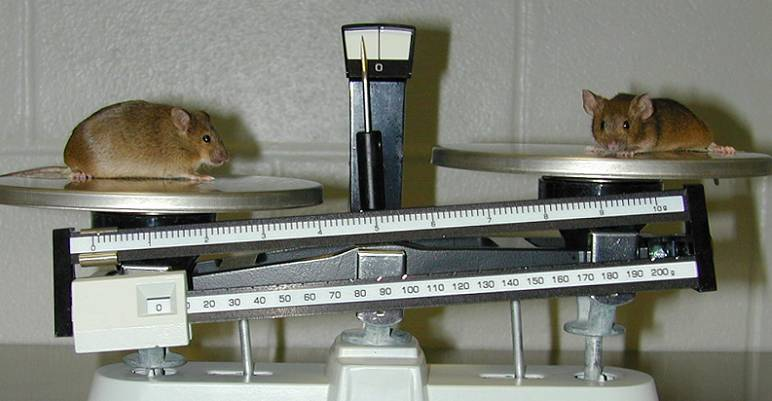
A Lexicon Genetics knockout mouse (left) that is a model of obesity, compared with a normal mouse.

Lexicon Pharmaceuticals was founded in September 1995 as a biotech venture of Baylor College of Medicine. The company went public in April 2000 with $220 million initial public offerings. In June, 2001 Lexicon purchased a privately owned small chemical library synthesis company, Coelacanth Corporation in Princeton, New Jersey, which became the site for the company's small molecule and medicinal chemistry efforts. The company's original name was Lexicon Genetics Incorporated, but in 2007, the name changed to Lexicon Pharmaceuticals, Inc. to reflect a renewed focus on drug development.

The company initially focused on using gene knockout technology to define the function of genes. This effort complemented and benefited from the international effort to sequence the human and mouse genomes (see Human Genome Project). Using its proprietary gene trapping and gene targeting technologies, the company created A repository of genetically modified mouse embryonic stem cells, known as OmniBank, and established a large-scale mammalian knockout program to discover the physiological and behavioral functions of the most druggable mammalian genes. The information collected from this program is stored in the company's LexVision database, which contains almost 5,000 gene knockouts studied. Over the years, Lexicon evolved from a genomics company into a drug discovery and development company focused on discovering and developing treatments for human disease. The company currently has multiple drug candidates in various stages of clinical trials.

In 2016, the company was ranked #8 on the Deloitte Fast 500 North America list.

== Technology ==
Lexicon uses patented gene trapping and gene targeting technologies to generate and study knockout mice to discover the physiological and behavioral effects that result from the disruption of a single gene knockout. Because there is a close similarity in gene function and physiology between mice and humans, with a large majority of human genes having a counterpart in the mouse genome, knockout mouse technology has become a powerful tool in the discovery of new medicines.

The value of Lexicon's technology in drug discovery has been described in a retrospective analysis by the scientific journal Nature. The conclusion of this analysis was that, in most cases, there was a direct correlation when comparing the physiological characteristics, or phenotypes, of knockout mice to the therapeutic effect of the 100 best-selling drugs of 2001. The tremendous utility of knockout mouse technology was recognized in 2007 with the Nobel Prize in Physiology or Medicine to Drs. Mario Capecchi, Martin Evans, and Oliver Smithies.

In developing small molecule drugs for its validated targets, Lexicon uses medicinal chemistry known as "click chemistry." Dr. K. Barry Sharpless, who was awarded the 2001 Nobel Prize in Chemistry, developed this tools for the rapid synthesis of novel compounds. Lexicon uses solution-phase chemistry to generate diverse libraries of optically pure compounds that are built using organic reactions that allow the company to generate collections of different compounds and to tailor the compound collections to address various therapeutic target families. Lexicon's medicinal chemists design these libraries by analyzing the chemical structures of drugs that have been proven safe and effective against human disease and using that knowledge in the design of scaffolds and chemical building blocks for the generation of large numbers of new drug-like compounds.

== Locations ==
Lexicon operates from two locations found in Texas and New Jersey. The corporate headquarters are in The Woodlands, Texas just north of Houston. This location serves as Lexicon's primary research facility to discover and validate the company's drug targets and test drug candidates in preclinical research. The company's clinical development and regulatory team is also based at the corporate headquarters.

Lexicon's campus in Princeton, New Jersey is the home of Lexicon's small molecule medicinal chemistry and preclinical development efforts. This site serves as Lexicon's primary medicinal chemistry site to create new chemical entities for therapeutic development.
