= Tryptophan hydroxylase =

Class of enzymes

Tryptophan 5-monooxygenase
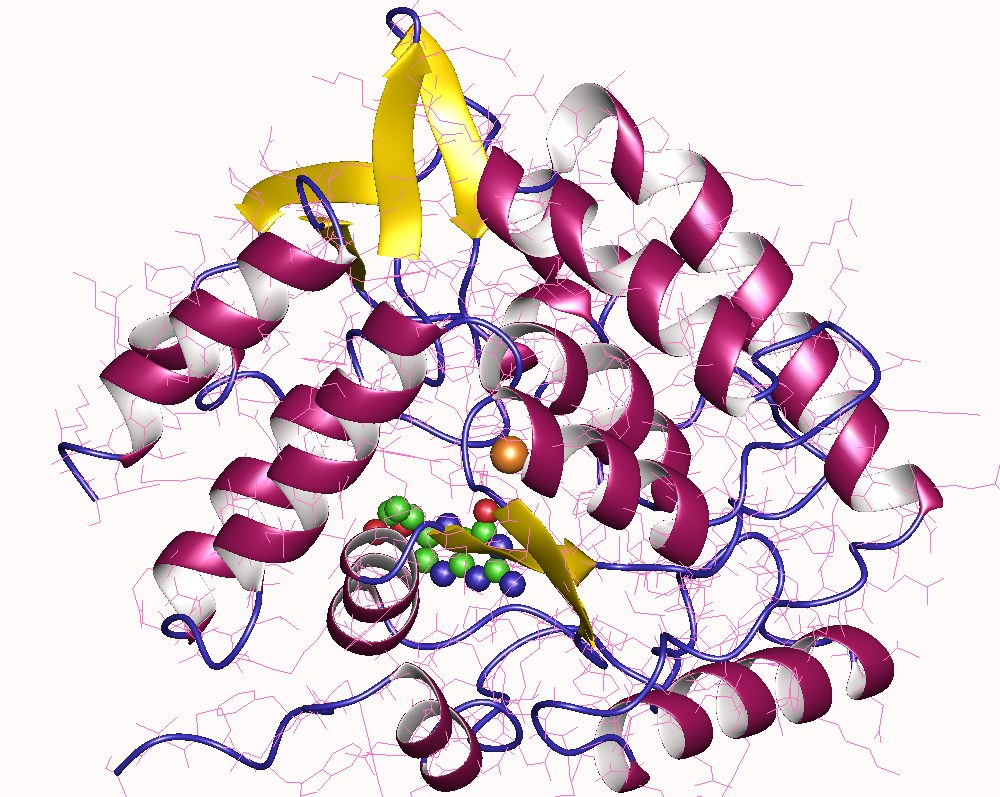
- Tryptophan 5-monooxygenase monomer (human)

Identifiers
- EC no.: 1.14.16.4
- CAS no.: 9037-21-2

Databases
- IntEnz: IntEnz view
- BRENDA: BRENDA entry
- ExPASy: NiceZyme view
- KEGG: KEGG entry
- MetaCyc: metabolic pathway
- PRIAM: profile
- PDB structures: RCSB PDB PDBe PDBsum
- Gene Ontology: AmiGO / QuickGO
Search
- PMC: articles
- PubMed: articles
- NCBI: proteins

tryptophan hydroxylase 1 (tryptophan 5-monooxygenase)

Identifiers
- Symbol: TPH1
- Alt. symbols: TPRH, TPH
- NCBI gene: 7166
- HGNC: 12008
- OMIM: 191060
- PDB: 1MLW
- RefSeq: NM_004179
- UniProt: P17752

Other data
- EC number: 1.14.16.4
- Locus: Chr. 11 p15.3-p14
Search for
- Structures: Swiss-model
- Domains: InterPro

tryptophan hydroxylase 2

Identifiers
- Symbol: TPH2
- NCBI gene: 121278
- HGNC: 20692
- OMIM: 607478
- RefSeq: NM_173353
- UniProt: Q8IWU9

Other data
- Locus: Chr. 12 q15
Search for
- Structures: Swiss-model
- Domains: InterPro

Tryptophan hydroxylase (TPH) is an enzyme (EC 1.14.16.4) involved in the synthesis of the monoamine neurotransmitter serotonin. Tyrosine hydroxylase, phenylalanine hydroxylase, and tryptophan hydroxylase together constitute the family of biopterin-dependent aromatic amino acid hydroxylases. TPH catalyzes the following chemical reaction:

Tryptophan
+
Tetrahydrobiopterin
O_{2}
H_{2}O
5-Hydroxytryptophan
+
Dihydrobiopterin

It employs one additional cofactor, iron.

== Function ==
It is responsible for addition of the -OH group (hydroxylation) to the 5 position to form the amino acid 5-hydroxytryptophan (5-HTP), which is the initial and rate-limiting step in the synthesis of the neurotransmitter serotonin. It is also the first enzyme in the synthesis of melatonin.

Tryptophan hydroxylase (TPH), tyrosine hydroxylase (TH) and phenylalanine hydroxylase (PAH) are members of a superfamily of aromatic amino acid hydroxylases, catalyzing key steps in important metabolic pathways. Analogously to phenylalanine hydroxylase and tyrosine hydroxylase, this enzyme uses (6R)-L-erythro-5,6,7,8-tetrahydrobiopterin (BH_{4}) and dioxygen as cofactors.

In humans, the stimulation of serotonin production by administration of tryptophan has an antidepressant effect and inhibition of tryptophan hydroxylase (e.g. by p-chlorophenylalanine) may precipitate depression.

The activity of tryptophan hydroxylase (i.e., the rate at which it converts L-tryptophan into the serotonin precursor L-5-hydroxytryptophan) can be increased when it undergoes phosphorylation. Protein Kinase A, for example, can phosphorylate tryptophan hydroxylase, thus increasing its activity.

== Isoforms ==
In humans, as well as in other mammals, there are two distinct TPH genes. In humans, these genes are located on chromosomes 11 and 12 and encode two different homologous enzymes TPH1 and TPH2 (sequence identity 71%).

- TPH1 is mostly expressed in tissues that express serotonin (a neurotransmitter) in the periphery (skin, gut, pineal gland) but it is also expressed in the central nervous system.
- On the other hand, TPH2 is exclusively expressed in neuronal cell types and is the predominant isoform in the central nervous system.

== Inhibitors ==
Tryptophan hydroxylase inhibitors include fenclonine (para-chlorophenylalanine or PCPA) and telotristat ethyl (a prodrug of telotristat).

== Additional images ==
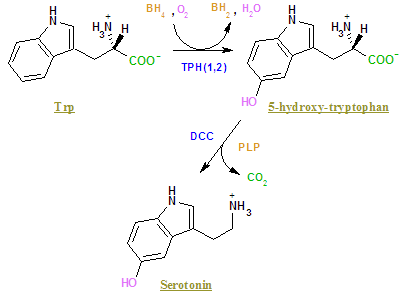
The pathway for the synthesis of serotonin from tryptophan

Metabolic pathway from tryptophan to serotonin
