= Drift hypothesis =

Relationship between mental illness and social class

Drift hypothesis, concerning the relationship between mental illness and social class, is the argument that illness causes one to have a downward shift in social class. The circumstances of one's social class do not cause the onset of a mental disorder, but rather, an individual's deteriorating mental health occurs first, resulting in low social class attainment. The drift hypothesis is the opposing theory of the social causation thesis, which says being in a lower social class is a contributor to the development of a mental illness.

== Support ==
A study by E. M. Goldberg and S. L. Morrison looked at the relationship between schizophrenia and social class. They wanted to find out if men, before they had been admitted to a mental hospital, drifted down the occupational scale to unskilled jobs because of their developing illness, or if it was because they were born into families with a lower social class attainment, that they developed their mental illness. They looked at men who had their first admission in a mental hospital between the ages of 25–34. They also looked at their fathers' occupation, in order to see if the social class they grew up in played a role in the development of schizophrenia. They found the men had grown up in families whose social class was similar to the general population. So the social class they grew up in did not seem to be a contributor to the development of their schizophrenia.

== Opposition ==
The main opposition to the drift hypothesis is the social causation thesis, which says social class position is causally related to the probability of mental illness. John W. Fox, from the University of Northern Colorado, conducted a study in 1990 that looked at previous studies concerning the relationship between social class and mental illness. These studies he looked at supported the drift hypothesis, but when he examined them, he found their conclusions were "based on assumptions and methods that lacked empirical support." Another statement in Fox's study was, in studies done on social class and mental illness, "identify drift as an individual's downward intergenerational social mobility after the onset of mental illness, rather than as residential drift from higher to lower class status areas". So depending on what one's definition of drift hypothesis is, there will be data either to support or refute the validity of it.

From an economic perspective of social class and mental illness, the social causation thesis is the ruling theory. People who are unemployed have been shown to have an increased amount of distress; have more physical health problems, which are often seen to be contributors of depression; and experience more frequent and more uncontrollable life events, which studies have shown increase the risk of developing some form of mental illness.

When looking at the gender differences in people who have mental illnesses, women are overly represented. Women are also the majority of people who are in poverty. Deborah Belle, a professor at Boston University, did a literature review on poverty and women's mental health and examined the psychological stressors that poor women and mothers experience. "A number of community studies conducted in the 1970s reported that mothers who were in financially strained circumstances were more likely to develop depressive symptoms than other women.

A person with mental illness, particularly if more severe, may suffer from loss of income. With this may come the need to accept public housing or food or utilities, if the person can find them.
