= Dennis Raphael =

Canadian sociologist

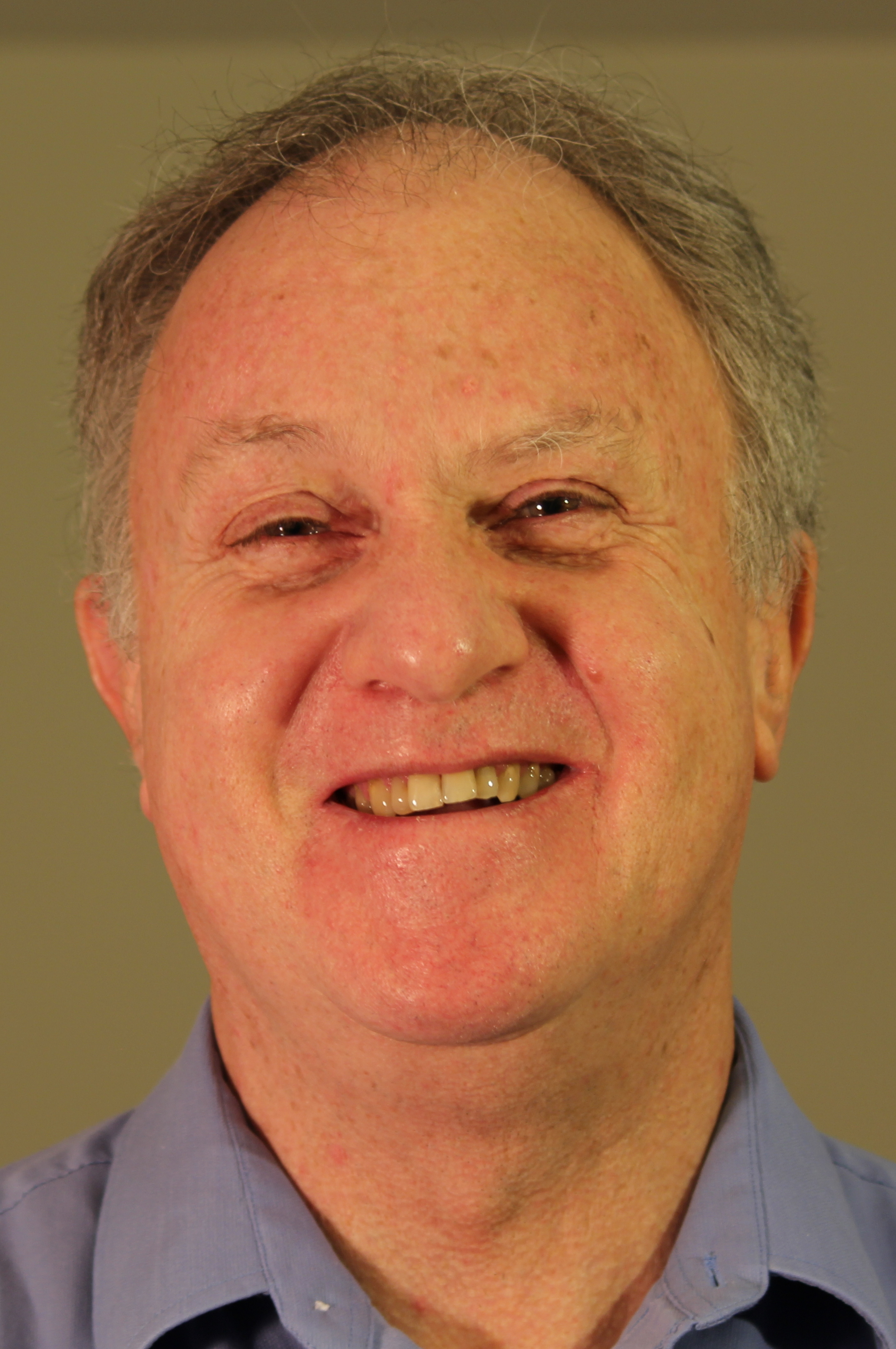
- Spouse: Toba Bryant

Academic background
- Education: University of Toronto
- Thesis: An investigation into aspects of identity status of high school females (1975)

Academic work
- Discipline: Health Studies
- Sub-discipline: Public Health
- Institutions: York University

Dennis Raphael is a Canadian social scientist who has written extensively on the social inequalities in health in Canada and elsewhere.

== Career ==
Raphael obtained his PhD from the University of Toronto in 1975. He has spent the majority of his career in the Department of Health Policy and Management at York University in Toronto.

== Research ==
Most of his over 300 scientific publications have focused on the health effects of income inequality and poverty, the quality of life of communities and individuals, and the impact of government decisions on Canadians' health and well-being. More recently, he has written on the need for a socialist future as capitalism is not only creating numerous health problems but seems incapable of solving them. Over the course of his career he has published 16 books, 67 book chapters, and 160 refereed journal articles. Raphael has recently published on the affinities between the social determinants of health and the social determinants of oral health, health discourses among disease associations, and concepts of legitimacy and competency of governing authorities in liberal welfare states. He also has had articles published concerning health inequalities in the Republic of Rwanda and the Nordic nations. He previously published two articles on the health of Nordic nations in the Scandinavian Journal of Public Health. Raphael's extensive contributions to the field were recognized by his being promoted to full professor and being the recipient of the 2009–2010 York University Faculty of Health Dean's Award in the Research — Established Career Category. Since 2004, he has managed the Social Determinants of Health Listserve at York University.

Most recently, he updated Staying Alive: Critical Perspectives on Health, Illness, and Health Care (third edition, 2019) with Toba Bryant and Marcia Rioux and, with Toba Bryant, prepared the volume The Politics of Health in the Canadian Welfare State (published in 2020). In June 2019 he gave a keynote address at the 9th Nordic Health Promotion Research Conference in Roskilde, Denmark. He has updated Poverty in Canada: Implications for Health and Quality of Life (third edition published in 2020). With Toba Bryant, Juha Mikkonen and Alexander Raphael he prepared the second edition of Social Determinants of Health: The Canadian Facts which is available at http://thecanadianfacts.org The first version was downloaded 1,200,000 times and helped shift the discourse on health and its determinants in Canada.

== Selected publications ==
- The politics of health in the Canadian welfare state (with Toba Bryant). https://www.canadianscholars.ca/books/the-politics-of-health-in-the-canadian-welfare-state] 2020. ISBN 9781773381893
- Social determinants of health: The Canadian facts (with Toba Bryant, Juha Mikkonen and Alexander Raphael). 2nd edition, http://thecanadianfacts.org] 2020. ISBN 978-0968348420
- Poverty in Canada: Implications for health and quality of life. 3rd edition, Canadian Scholars’ Press, 2020. ISBN 9781773381923
- Staying alive: Critical perspectives on health, illness, and health care (with Toba Bryant and Marcia Rioux). 3rd edition, Canadian Scholars’ Press, 2019. ISBN 9781773381305
- Immigration, public policy, and health: Newcomer experiences in developed nations. Canadian Scholars’ Press , 2016. ISBN 9781551309279
- Social determinants of health: Canadian perspectives. 3rd edition, Canadian Scholars’ Press , 2016. ISBN 978-1-55130-897-5
- Tackling health inequalities: Lessons from International experiences. Canadian Scholars’ Press.CSPI. 2012. ISBN 978-1551304120
- About Canada: Health and illness, 2nd edition , 2010. Fernwood Publishers. ISBN 978-1-55266-375-2
- Health promotion and quality of life in Canada: Essential readings. Canadian Scholars’ Press, 2010. ISBN 978-1-55130-367-3
- Reducing Social and Health Inequalities Requires Building Social and Political Movements; Humanity & Society , Vol 33, Issue 1-2, pp. 145–165; February 1, 2009; doi:10.1177/016059760903300109
