= Telotristat ethyl =

Chemical compound

Clinical data
- Trade names: Xermelo
- Other names: LX1032, LX1606
- AHFS/Drugs.com: Monograph
- MedlinePlus: a617029
- License data: US DailyMed: Telotristat_ethyl
- Pregnancy category: AU: B3
- Routes of administration: By mouth
- ATC code: A16AX15 (WHO)

Legal status
- Legal status: AU: S4 (Prescription only); CA: ℞-only; UK: POM (Prescription only); US: ℞-only; EU: Rx-only

Pharmacokinetic data
- Protein binding: >99% (both telotristat ethyl and telotristat)
- Metabolism: Hydrolysis via carboxylesterases
- Metabolites: Telotristat
- Elimination half-life: 0.6 hours (telotristat ethyl), 5 hours (telotristat)
- Excretion: Feces (92.8%), urine (less than 0.4%)

Identifiers
- IUPAC name: [(S)-Ethyl 2-amino-3-(4-(2-amino-6-((R)-1-(4-chloro-2-(3-methyl-1H-pyrazol-1-yl)phenyl)-2,2,2-trifluoroethoxy)pyrimidin-4-yl)phenyl)propanoate]
- CAS Number: 1033805-22-9
- PubChem CID: 25181577
- DrugBank: DB12095
- ChemSpider: 28189674
- UNII: 8G388563M7
- KEGG: D09974; as etiprate: D09975
- ChEMBL: ChEMBL2105695
- CompTox Dashboard (EPA): DTXSID001102271

Chemical and physical data
- Formula: C_{27}H_{26}ClF_{3}N_{6}O_{3}
- Molar mass: 574.99 g·mol^{−1}
- 3D model (JSmol): Interactive image
- SMILES: CCOC(=O)C(CC1=CC=C(C=C1)C2=CC(=NC(=N2)N)OC(C3=C(C=C(C=C3)Cl)N4C=CC(=N4)C)C(F)(F)F)N
- InChI: InChI=1S/C27H26ClF3N6O3/c1-3-39-25(38)20(32)12-16-4-6-17(7-5-16)21-14-23(35-26(33)34-21)40-24(27(29,30)31)19-9-8-18(28)13-22(19)37-11-10-15(2)36-37/h4-11,13-14,20,24H,3,12,32H2,1-2H3,(H2,33,34,35)/t20-,24+/m0/s1; Key:MDSQOJYHHZBZKA-GBXCKJPGSA-N

Telotristat ethyl (USAN, brand name Xermelo) is a prodrug of telotristat, which is an inhibitor of tryptophan hydroxylase. It is formulated as telotristat etiprate — a hippurate salt of telotristat ethyl.

On February 28, 2017, the U.S. Food and Drug Administration (FDA) approved telotristat ethyl in combination with somatostatin analog (SSA) therapy for the treatment of adults with diarrhea associated with carcinoid syndrome that SSA therapy alone has inadequately controlled. Telotristat ethyl was approved for use in the European Union in September 2017.

The U.S. Food and Drug Administration (FDA) considers it to be a first-in-class medication.

== Pharmacology ==
Telotristat is an inhibitor of tryptophan hydroxylase, which mediates the rate-limiting step in serotonin biosynthesis.

Action of telotristat on tryptophan hydroxylase

== Adverse effects ==
Common adverse effects noted in clinical trials include nausea, headache, elevated liver enzymes, depression, accumulation of fluid causing swelling (peripheral edema), flatulence, decreased appetite, and fever. Constipation is also common, and may be serious or life-threatening (especially in overdose).

== Formulations ==
It is marketed by Lexicon Pharmaceuticals (as telotristat etiprate). 328 mg telotristat etiprate is equivalent to 250 mg telotristate ethyl.

Telotristat etiprate
