= TPH1 =

Protein-coding gene in the species Homo sapiens

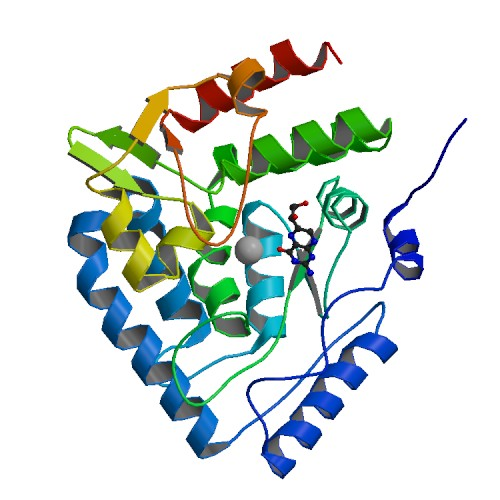

Identifiers
- Aliases: TPH1, TPRH, TRPH, tryptophan hydroxylase 1
- External IDs: OMIM: 191060; MGI: 98796; GeneCards: TPH1
Available structures
PDB	Ortholog search: PDBe RCSB
PDB	List of PDB id codes 1MLW, 3HF6, 3HF8, 3HFB, 5J6D
Enzyme activity
EC #	BRENDA	ExPASy	KEGG	MetaCyc
1.14.16.4	↗	↗	↗	↗

Gene location (Human)
Chr.	Chromosome 11 (human)
Band	11p15.1	Start	18,017,555 bp
Band	11p15.1	End	18,046,269 bp

Gene location (Mouse)
Chr.	Chromosome 7 (mouse)
Band	7 B3|7 30.43 cM	Start	46,294,065 bp
Band	7 B3|7 30.43 cM	End	46,321,961 bp
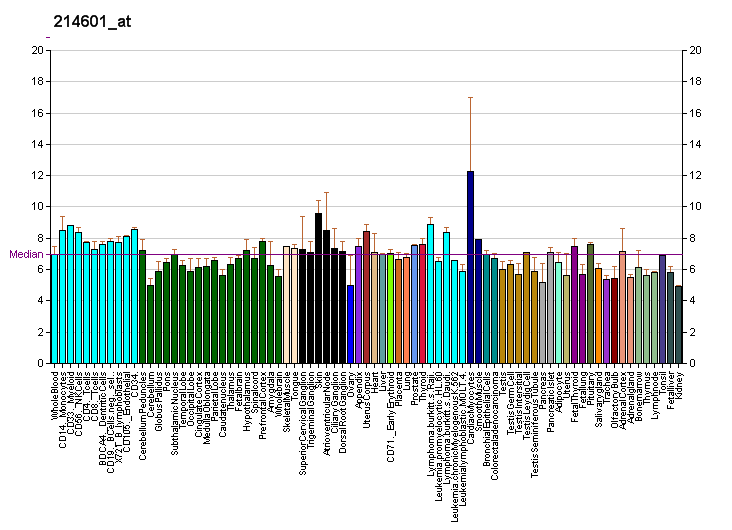
RNA expression pattern
Bgee	Human / Mouse (ortholog); Top expressed in: buccal mucosa cell; rectum; ascending aorta; Descending thoracic aorta; mucosa of sigmoid colon; testicle; pylorus; tibial arteries; jejunal mucosa; duodenum / Top expressed in: pineal gland; duodenum; lactiferous gland; pyloric antrum; embryo; embryo; jejunum; muscle of thigh; left colon; extraocular muscle; More reference expression data
BioGPS	More reference expression data
Gene ontology
Molecular function	iron ion binding; metal ion binding; monooxygenase activity; tryptophan 5-monooxygenase activity; oxidoreductase activity, acting on paired donors, with incorporation or reduction of molecular oxygen, reduced pteridine as one donor, and incorporation of one atom of oxygen; oxidoreductase activity
Cellular component	cytoplasm; cytosol; neuron projection
Biological process	response to immobilization stress; mammary gland alveolus development; serotonin biosynthetic process; negative regulation of ossification; aromatic amino acid family metabolic process; bone remodeling; circadian rhythm; positive regulation of fat cell differentiation; indolalkylamine biosynthetic process
Sources:Amigo / QuickGO
Orthologs
Databases	NCBI: entry; OMA: entry
Species	Human	Mouse
Entrez	7166	21990
Ensembl	ENSG00000129167	ENSMUSG00000040046
UniProt	P17752	P17532
RefSeq (mRNA)	NM_004179	NM_001136084; NM_001276372; NM_009414
RefSeq (protein)	NP_004170	NP_001129556; NP_001263301; NP_033440
Location (UCSC)	Chr 11: 18.02 – 18.05 Mb	Chr 7: 46.29 – 46.32 Mb
PubMed search
- Wikidata
View/Edit Human	View/Edit Mouse

Tryptophan hydroxylase 1 (TPH1) is an isoenzyme of tryptophan hydroxylase which in humans is encoded by the TPH1 gene.

TPH1 was first discovered to support serotonin synthesis in 1988 by converting tryptophan into 5-hydroxytryptophan. It was thought that there only was a single TPH gene until 2003. A second form was found in the mouse (Tph2), rat and human brain (TPH2) and the original TPH was then renamed to TPH1.

== Function ==
Tryptophan hydroxylases catalyze the biopterin-dependent monooxygenation of tryptophan to 5-hydroxytryptophan (5-HTP), which is subsequently decarboxylated by aromatic amino acid decarboxylase to form the neurotransmitter serotonin (5-hydroxytryptamine or 5-HT). It is the rate-limiting enzyme in the biosynthesis of serotonin.

TPH expression is limited to a few specialized tissues: raphe neurons, pinealocytes, mast cells, mononuclear leukocytes, beta-cells of the islets of Langerhans, and intestinal and pancreatic enterochromaffin cells.

== Clinical significance ==
Tryptophan hydroxylase is important for synthesizing indoleamine neurotransmitters and related compounds in the body and brain, including serotonin and melatonin. TPH1 is expressed in the body, but not the brain. Nevertheless, the effect of variations in the TPH1 gene on brain-related variables, such as personality traits and neuropsychiatric disorders, has been studied. For example, one study (1998) found an association between a polymorphism in the gene with impulsive-aggression measures, while a case-control study (2001) could find no association between polymorphisms and Alzheimer's disease.

One human mutant of TPH1, A218C found in intron 7, is highly associated with schizophrenia. Introns are regions of DNA that do not code for the amino acid sequence of a protein and were long considered to be 'junk DNA' lacking purpose. The correlation of an intron mutation with schizophrenia is significant because it suggests that introns have an important role in translation, transcription, or another, possibly unknown, aspect of the production of proteins from DNA.

== See also ==
- Tryptophan hydroxylase
- TPH2
- Rs1799913 (A779C): intron related to figural and numeric creativity
- rs1800532 (A218C)
