= ARFB =

'ARFB, ArfB or arfB may refer to:

== Biochemistry ==
- 2-amino-5-formylamino-6-ribosylaminopyrimidin-4(3H)-one 5'-monophosphate deformylase, an enzyme
- Alternative ribosome-rescue factor B - ArfB, a protein that helps rescue stalled ribosomes.
- arfB the gene for ArfB.

== Organisations ==
- Arkansas Farm Bureau Federation, a non-profit organization
- Association Royale des anciens élèves de l'institut des industries de Fermentation de Bruxelles, a non-profit organization
