= GTP cyclohydrolase =

Guanosine triphosphate (GTP), the substrate of GTP cyclohydrolases

GTP cyclohydrolases are enzymes that catalyze imidazole ring opening of guanosine triphosphate (GTP). This reaction is the committed step in the biosynthesis of multiple coenzymes (such as riboflavin and folate), tRNA bases, and the phytotoxin toxoflavin. Several GTP cyclohydrolases exist, which sometimes synthesize different products for different purposes:

- GTP cyclohydrolase I, part of the tetrahydrobiopterin, tetrahydrofolate, queuosine and other biosynthetic pathways
- GTP cyclohydrolase Ia,
- GTP cyclohydrolase Ib, part of the tetrahydrobiopterin, tetrahydrofolate, queueosine and other biosynthetic pathways
- GTP cyclohydrolase II, part of the riboflavin and toxoflavin biosynthetic pathways
- GTP cyclohydrolase IIa (or GTP cyclohydrolase III), part of the riboflavin and deazaflavin cofactor biosynthetic pathways
- GTP cyclohydrolase IV
- GTP cyclohydrolase MptA, GTP cyclohydrolase Ib paralog

These enzymes require divalent cations for catalysis.
