= 2,5-Diamino-6-hydroxy-4-(5-phosphoribosylamino)pyrimidine =

- (1)

Names
- IUPAC name (1R)-1,4-Anhydro-1-[(2,5-diamino-6-oxo-1,6-dihydropyrimidin-4-yl)amino]-D-ribitol 5-(dihydrogen phosphate)
- Systematic IUPAC name {(2R,3S,4R,5R)-5-[(2,5-Diamino-6-oxo-1,6-dihydropyrimidin-4-yl)amino]-3,4-dihydroxyoxolan-2-yl}methyl dihydrogen phosphate
- Other names 2,5-Diamino-6-ribofuranosylamino-4(3H)-pyrimidinone monophosphate; N-(2,5-Diamino-6-hydroxypyrimidin-4-yl)-5-O-phosphono-β-D-ribofuranosylamine

Identifiers
CAS Number	73477-63-1
3D model (JSmol)	Interactive image
ChEBI	CHEBI:29114; tautomer: CHEBI:59546
ChemSpider	388579
KEGG	C01304
PubChem CID	135398601
CompTox Dashboard (EPA)	DTXSID601146968
- InChI: InChI=1S/C9H16N5O8P/c10-3-6(13-9(11)14-7(3)17)12-8-5(16)4(15)2(22-8)1-21-23(18,19)20/h2,4-5,8,15-16H,1,10H2,(H2,18,19,20)(H4,11,12,13,14,17)/t2-,4-,5-,8-/m1/s1 Key: OCLCLRXKNJCOJD-UMMCILCDSA-N; InChI=1/C9H16N5O8P/c10-3-6(13-9(11)14-7(3)17)12-8-5(16)4(15)2(22-8)1-21-23(18,19)20/h2,4-5,8,15-16H,1,10H2,(H2,18,19,20)(H4,11,12,13,14,17)/t2-,4-,5-,8-/m1/s1 Key: OCLCLRXKNJCOJD-UMMCILCDBC
- SMILES: C([C@@H]1[C@H]([C@H]([C@@H](O1)NC2=C(C(=O)N=C(N2)N)N)O)O)OP(=O)(O)O

Properties
Chemical formula	C_{9}H_{16}N_{5}O_{8}P
Molar mass	353.228 g·mol^{−1}
- Except where otherwise noted, data are given for materials in their standard state (at 25 °C [77 °F], 100 kPa). Infobox references

2,5-diamino-6-hydroxy-4-(5-phosphoribosylamino)pyrimidine (1) is a metabolite in purine metabolism, in a biosynthetic pathway from guanosine triphosphate to riboflavin.

== Biosynthesis ==
The compound (1) is formed by the hydrolysis of guanosine triphosphate (GTP) by GTP cyclohydrolase II, giving formic acid and phosphoric acid (P_{i}) as byproducts:

guanosine triphosphate
4 H_{2}O
HCO_{2}H
(1)
+ 2 P_{i}

Alternatively, two separate enzymes can carry out the overall reaction. Initially, GTP cyclohydrolase IIa hydrolyses the 8,9 bond and removes two phosphate groups, giving 2-amino-5-formylamino-6-(5-phospho-D-ribosylamino)pyrimidin-4(3H)-one (2), followed by de-formylation by 2-amino-5-formylamino-6-ribosylaminopyrimidin-4(3H)-one 5'-monophosphate deformylase.

GTP
hydrolase
3 H_{2}O
2 P_{i}
(2)
deformylase
H_{2}O
HCO_{2}H
(1)

== Metabolism ==
Compound (1) is deaminated by diaminohydroxyphosphoribosylaminopyrimidine deaminase to form 5-amino-6-(5-phospho-β-D-ribosylamino)uracil. In this sequence towards riboflavin, the next step is a reduction reaction which opens the ribose ring.

(1)
H_{2}O
NH_{3}
5-amino-6-(5-phospho-β-D-ribosylamino)uracil

In plants, 5-amino-6-(5-phospho-β-D-ribosylamino)uracil functions in the early part of the riboflavin biosynthesis pathway. Riboflavin is later used to produce flavin cofactors such as FMN and FAD. In rice, this part of the pathway involves bifunctional RibA proteins that possess both GTP cyclohydrolase II activity and 3,4-dihydroxy-2-butanone-4-phosphate (3,4-DHBP) synthase activity. The 3,4-DHBP synthase activity converts D-ribulose 5-phosphate into L-3,4-dihydroxy-2-butanone 4-phosphate and formate, providing other early precursors needed for riboflavin synthesis.

Studies of rice RibA proteins point towards the fact that the catalytic steps associated with this compound are important for regulating vitamin B₂ biosynthesis in plants. RibA activity contributes to the production of early intermediates in the riboflavin pathway, and changes in this part of the pathway could affect the amount of riboflavin produced by plant cells. 2,5-diamino-6-hydroxy-4-(5-phosphoribosylamino)pyrimidine is relevant not only as a biochemical intermediate, but also as part of a metabolic pathway in plants that is involved in flavin cofactor production.

In some archaea, compound (1) is first acted on by the reductase, 2,5-diamino-6-(ribosylamino)-4(3H)-pyrimidinone 5'-phosphate reductase to give compound (3), 2,5-diamino-6-(5-phosphono)ribitylamino-4(3H)-pyrimidinone. In this sequence, the deaminase reaction is a later step.

(1) + NADH
H^{+}
H^{+}
(3)
+ NAD^{+}
