= Diaminohydroxyphosphoribosylaminopyrimidine deaminase =

Class of enzymes

Diaminohydroxyphosphoribosyl aminopyrimidine deaminase

Identifiers
- EC no.: 3.5.4.26
- CAS no.: 68994-19-4

Databases
- BRENDA: enzyme data
- ExPASy: NiceZyme view
- KEGG: enzyme entry
- MetaCyc: metabolic pathway
- Rhea: reactions
- PDB structures: RCSB PDB PDBe PDBsum
- Gene Ontology: AmiGO / QuickGO
Search
- PMC: articles
- PubMed: articles
- NCBI: proteins

Diaminohydroxyphosphoribosylaminopyrimidine deaminase (EC 3.5.4.26) is an enzyme characterised from Escherichia coli that catalyzes the hydrolysis of 2,5-diamino-6-hydroxy-4-(5-phosphoribosylamino)pyrimidine to 5-amino-6-(5-phospho-β-D-ribosylamino)uracil and ammonia:

2,5-Diamino-6-hydroxy-4-(5-phosphoribosylamino)pyrimidine
H_{2}O
NH_{3}
5-amino-6-(5-phospho-β-D-ribosylamino)uracil

The reaction is part of the biosynthesis of riboflavin in Streptomyces davawensis.

This enzyme is a hydrolase, one acting on carbon-nitrogen bonds other than peptide bonds (specifically in cyclic amidines). The systematic name of this enzyme class is 2,5-diamino-6-hydroxy-4-(5-phosphoribosylamino)pyrimidine 2-aminohydrolase.

== Structural studies ==
As of late 2007, 6 structures have been solved for this class of enzymes, with PDB accession codes PDB: 2B3Z, PDB: 2D5N, PDB: 2G6V, PDB: 2HXV, PDB: 2O7P, and PDB: 2OBC.
