= PTS (gene) =

Protein-coding gene in the species Homo sapiens

Identifiers
- Aliases: PTS, Pts, PTPS, 6-pyruvoyltetrahydropterin synthase, 6-pyruvoyl-tetrahydropterin synthase
- External IDs: OMIM: 612719; MGI: 1338783; GeneCards: PTS
Available structures
PDB	Ortholog search: PDBe RCSB
PDB	List of PDB id codes 3I2B
Enzyme activity
EC #	BRENDA	ExPASy	KEGG	MetaCyc
4.2.3.12	↗	↗	↗	↗

Gene location (Human)
Chr.	Chromosome 11 (human)
Band	11q23.1	Start	112,226,367 bp
Band	11q23.1	End	112,269,955 bp

Gene location (Mouse)
Chr.	Chromosome 9 (mouse)
Band	9|9 A5.3	Start	50,521,617 bp
Band	9|9 A5.3	End	50,528,724 bp
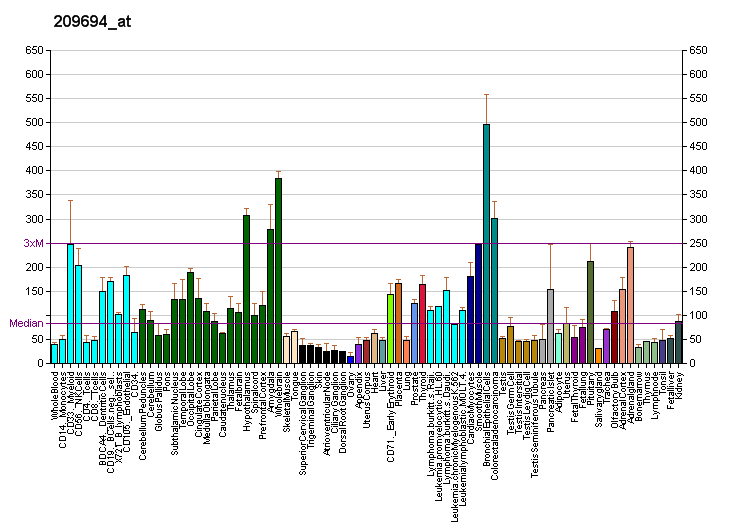
RNA expression pattern
Bgee	Human / Mouse (ortholog); Top expressed in: right adrenal gland; left adrenal cortex; right lobe of liver; right adrenal cortex; pons; hypothalamus; superior vestibular nucleus; glutes; biceps brachii; gingival epithelium / Top expressed in: right kidney; granulocyte; proximal tubule; corneal stroma; medullary collecting duct; intercostal muscle; Paneth cell; brown adipose tissue; lumbar spinal ganglion; islet of Langerhans; More reference expression data
BioGPS	More reference expression data
Gene ontology
Molecular function	protein binding; protein homodimerization activity; metal ion binding; lyase activity; 6-pyruvoyltetrahydropterin synthase activity; identical protein binding
Cellular component	cytoplasm; cytosol; mitochondrion
Biological process	tetrahydrobiopterin biosynthetic process; cellular amino acid metabolic process; central nervous system development
Sources:Amigo / QuickGO
Orthologs
Databases	NCBI: entry; OMA: entry
Species	Human	Mouse
Entrez	5805	19286
Ensembl	ENSG00000150787	ENSMUSG00000032067
UniProt	Q03393	Q9R1Z7
RefSeq (mRNA)	NM_000317	NM_011220
RefSeq (protein)	NP_000308	NP_035350; NP_001351417; NP_001351418; NP_001351419
Location (UCSC)	Chr 11: 112.23 – 112.27 Mb	Chr 9: 50.52 – 50.53 Mb
PubMed search
- Wikidata
View/Edit Human	View/Edit Mouse

6-pyruvoyltetrahydropterin synthase, also known as PTS, is a human gene which facilitates folate biosynthesis.

== See also ==
- 6-pyruvoyltetrahydropterin synthase
- 6-Pyruvoyltetrahydropterin synthase deficiency
