= Cyclin-dependent kinase regulatory subunit family =

CKS
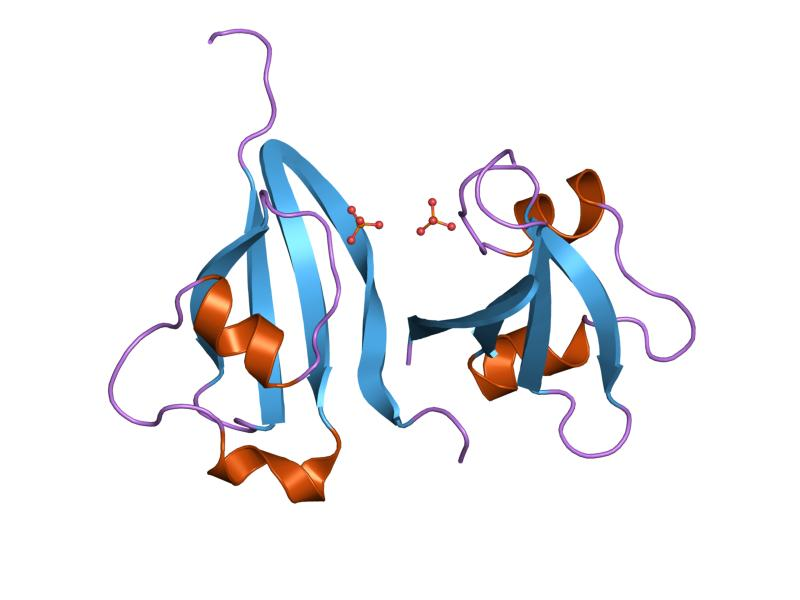
- ckshs1: human cyclin dependent kinase subunit, type 1 in complex with phosphate

Identifiers
- Symbol: CKS
- Pfam: PF01111
- InterPro: IPR000789
- PROSITE: PDOC00728
- SCOP2: 1cks / SCOPe / SUPFAM
Available protein structures:
- PDB: IPR000789 PF01111 (ECOD; PDBsum)
- AlphaFold: IPR000789; PF01111

In molecular biology, the cyclin-dependent kinase regulatory subunit family is a family of proteins consisting of the regulatory subunits of cyclin-dependent protein kinases.

In eukaryotes, cyclin-dependent protein kinases interact with cyclins to regulate cell cycle progression, and are required for the G1 and G2 stages of cell division. The proteins bind to a regulatory subunit, cyclin-dependent kinase regulatory subunit (CKS), which is essential for their function. This regulatory subunit is a small protein of 79 to 150 residues. In yeast (gene CKS1) and in fission yeast (gene suc1) a single isoform is known, while mammals have two highly related isoforms. The regulatory subunits exist as hexamers, formed by the symmetrical assembly of 3 interlocked homodimers, creating an unusual 12-stranded beta-barrel structure. Through the barrel centre runs a 12Å diameter tunnel, lined by 6 exposed helix pairs. Six kinase units can be modelled to bind the hexameric structure, which may thus act as a hub for cyclin-dependent protein kinase multimerisation.

This family includes the CKS1B and CKS2 genes in mammals.
