= Dopamine-responsive dystonia =

Movement disorder

- Other names: Segawa syndrome, Segawa's disease, Segawa's dystonia, hereditary progressive dystonia with diurnal fluctuation
- Specialty: Neurology, medical genetics

Dopamine-responsive dystonia (DRD) also known as Segawa syndrome (SS), is a genetic movement disorder which usually manifests itself during early childhood at around ages 5–8 years (variable start age).

Characteristic symptoms are increased muscle tone (dystonia, such as clubfoot) and Parkinsonian features, typically absent in the morning or after rest but worsening during the day and with exertion. Children with dopamine-responsive dystonia are often misdiagnosed as having cerebral palsy. The disorder responds well to treatment with levodopa.

== Signs and symptoms ==
The disease typically starts in one limb, typically one leg. Progressive dystonia results in clubfoot and tiptoe walking. The symptoms can spread to all four limbs around age 18, after which progression slows and eventually symptoms reach a plateau. There can be regression in developmental milestones (both motor and mental skills) and failure to thrive in the absence of treatment.

In addition, dopamine-responsive dystonia is typically characterized by signs of parkinsonism that may be relatively subtle. Such signs may include slowness of movement (bradykinesia), tremors, stiffness and resistance to movement (rigidity), balance difficulties, and postural instability. Approximately 25% also have abnormally exaggerated reflex responses (hyperreflexia), particularly in the legs. These symptoms can result in a presentation similar to that of Parkinson's disease.

Many patients experience improvement with sleep, are relatively free of symptoms in the morning, and develop increasingly severe symptoms as the day progresses (i.e., diurnal fluctuation). Accordingly, this disorder has sometimes been referred to as "progressive hereditary dystonia with diurnal fluctuations" (Segawa, 2000). Yet some people with dopamine-responsive dystonia do not experience such diurnal fluctuations, causing many researchers to prefer other disease terms.

== Genetics ==
Autosomal dominant and autosomal recessive forms of the disease have been reported. Mutations in five genes have been shown to cause dopamine-responsive dystonia. These mutations, according to a review published in 2021, are associated with the following conditions:

- Autosomal dominant GTP cyclohydrolase I deficiency (autosomal dominant Segawa syndrome)
- Autosomal recessive GTP cyclohydrolase I deficiency
- Tyrosine hydroxylase deficiency (autosomal recessive Segawa syndrome)
- 6-Pyruvoyltetrahydropterin synthase deficiency
- Sepiapterin reductase deficiency
- Dihydropteridine reductase deficiency

The precursor of the neurotransmitter dopamine, L-dopa, is synthesised from tyrosine by the enzyme tyrosine hydroxylase and utilises tetrahydrobiopterin (BH4) as a cofactor. A mutation in the gene GCH1, which encodes the enzyme GTP cyclohydrolase I, disrupts the production of BH4, decreasing dopamine levels (hypodopaminergia). This autosomal-dominant condition is the most frequent cause of dopamine-responsive dystonia. Mutations in the gene for tyrosine hydroxylase may lead to tyrosine hydroxylase deficiency, a rare form of dopamine-responsive dystonia inherited in an autosomal recessive manner. The activity of dopaminergic neurons in the nigrostriatal pathway normally peaks during the morning and also decreases with age until after age 20, which explains why the symptoms worsen during the course of the day and with increasing age until the third decade of life.

== Diagnosis ==
Due to the condition's rarity, it is frequently misdiagnosed, often as cerebral palsy. This results in patients often living their entire childhood with the condition untreated.

The diagnosis of dopamine-responsive dystonia can be made from a typical history, a trial of dopamine medications, and genetic testing. Not all patients show mutations in the GCH1 gene (GTP cyclohydrolase I), which makes genetic testing imperfect.

Sometimes a lumbar puncture is performed to measure concentrations of biopterin and neopterin, which can help determine the exact form of dopamine-responsive movement disorder: early onset parkinsonism (reduced biopterin and normal neopterin), GTP cyclohydrolase I deficiency (both decreased) and tyrosine hydroxylase deficiency (both normal).

In approximately half of cases, a phenylalanine loading test can be used to show decreased conversion from the amino acid phenylalanine to tyrosine. This process uses BH4 as a cofactor.

During a sleep study (polysomnography), decreased twitching may be noticed during REM sleep.

An MRI scan of the brain can be used to look for conditions that can mimic dopamine-responsive dystonia (for example, metal deposition in the basal ganglia can indicate Wilson's disease or pantothenate kinase-associated neurodegeneration). Nuclear imaging of the brain using positron emission tomography (PET scan) shows a normal radiolabelled dopamine uptake in dopamine-responsive dystonia, contrary to the decreased uptake in Parkinson's disease.

Other differential diagnoses include metabolic disorders (such as GM2 gangliosidosis, phenylketonuria, hypothyroidism, Leigh syndrome) primarily dystonic juvenile parkinsonism, autosomal recessive early-onset parkinsonism with diurnal fluctuation, early-onset idiopathic parkinsonism, focal dystonias, dystonia musculorum deformans, and dyspeptic dystonia with hiatal hernia.

== Treatment ==
In those with dopamine-responsive dystonia, symptoms typically dramatically improve with low-dose administration of levodopa, which is a biochemically significant metabolite of the amino acid phenylalanine, as well as a biological precursor of dopamine, a neurotransmitter. Low-dose levodopa usually results in near-complete or total reversal of all associated symptoms for these patients. In addition, the effectiveness of such therapy is typically long term, without the complications that often occur for those with Parkinson's disease who undergo levodopa treatment.

No data are available on mortality associated with dopamine-responsive dystonia, but patients surviving beyond the fifth decade with treatment have been reported. However, in severe, early autosomal recessive forms of the disease, patients have been known to pass away during childhood. Females seem to be somewhat more commonly affected. The disease less commonly begins during puberty or after age 20, and very rarely, cases in older adults have been reported.

Due to commonly being misdiagnosed, it is common for the disease to remain untreated. When left untreated, patients often need Achilles' tendon surgery by the age of 21. They will also struggle with walking, an ability that will degrade throughout the day. Power napping can provide temporary relief in untreated patients. It also impairs development into adulthood, reduces balance, and reduces calf muscle development. Socially, it can result in depression, lack of social skills, and inability to find employment.

== Epidemiology ==
This condition is very rare, only affecting one in two million people. It is more common in females than in males. There are several hundred cases in the United States, 25 known cases in the United Kingdom, and less than that in Australia and New Zealand.

== Research ==
Response to treatment is variable and the long-term and functional outcome is unknown. To provide a basis for improving the understanding of the epidemiology, genotype/phenotype correlation and outcome of these diseases their impact on the quality of life of patients, and for evaluating diagnostic and therapeutic strategies a patient registry was established by the noncommercial International Working Group on Neurotransmitter Related Disorders.

== History ==
The disease is named after Dr. Masaya Segawa, who provided an early clinical description in 1976.
