= (tyrosine 3-monooxygenase) kinase =

Class of enzymes

[tyrosine 3-monooxygenase] kinase

Identifiers
- EC no.: 2.7.11.6
- CAS no.: 103537-12-8

Databases
- IntEnz: IntEnz view
- BRENDA: BRENDA entry
- ExPASy: NiceZyme view
- KEGG: KEGG entry
- MetaCyc: metabolic pathway
- PRIAM: profile
- PDB structures: RCSB PDB PDBe PDBsum
- Gene Ontology: AmiGO / QuickGO
Search
- PMC: articles
- PubMed: articles
- NCBI: proteins

In enzymology, a [tyrosine 3-monooxygenase] kinase (EC 2.7.11.6) is an enzyme that catalyzes the chemical reaction

ATP + [tyrosine-3-monooxygenase] $\rightleftharpoons$ ADP + phospho-[tyrosine-3-monooxygenase]

Thus, the two substrates of this enzyme are ATP and tyrosine 3-monooxygenase, whereas its two products are ADP and phospho-(tyrosine-3-monooxygenase).

This enzyme belongs to the family of transferases, specifically those transferring a phosphate group to the sidechain oxygen atom of serine or threonine residues in proteins (protein-serine/threonine kinases). The systematic name of this enzyme class is ATP:[tyrosine-3-monoxygenase] phosphotransferase. Other names in common use include pheochromocytoma tyrosine hydroxylase-associated kinase, STK4, and tyrosine 3-monooxygenase kinase (phosphorylating). This enzyme participates in MAPK signaling pathway and non-small cell lung cancer.
