= Tyrosine hydroxylase deficiency =

Medical condition

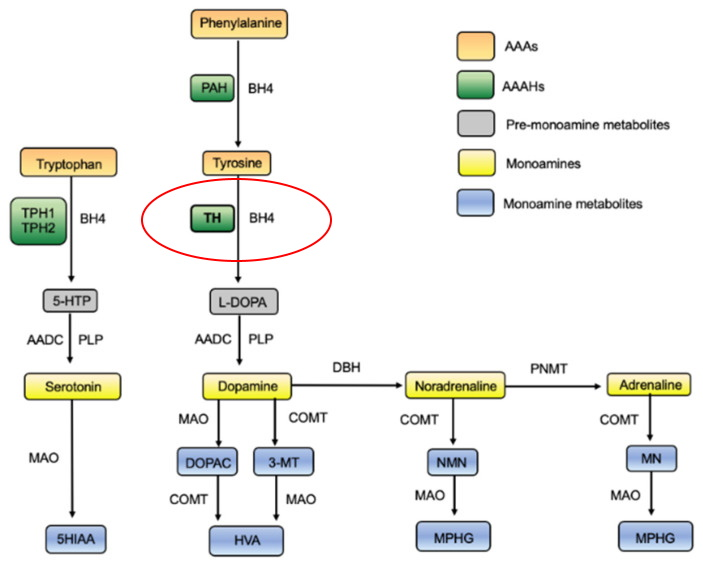
- Simplified overview of the biosynthesis and catabolism of serotonin and the catecholamines, with tyrosine hydroxylase (TH) and its cofactor tetrahydrobiopterin (BH_{4}) circled in red. Note that different parts of these processes take place in different tissues. Abbreviations: 3-MT, 3-methoxytyramine; 5-HTP, 5-hydroxytryptophan; 5HIAA, 5-hydroxyindolacetic acid; AAAHs, aromatic amino acid hydroxylases; AAAs, aromatic amino acids; AADC, aromatic acid decarboxylase; BH4, (6R)-L-erythro-5,6,7,8-tetrahydrobiopterin; COMT, catechol-O-methyltransferase; DBH, dopamine beta-hydroxylase; DOPAC, 3,4-dihydroxyphenylacetic acid; HVA, homovanillic acid; L-DOPA, L-3,4-dihydroxyphenylalanine; MN, metanephrine; MAO, monoamine oxidase; MPHG, 3-methoxy-4-hydroxyphenylethylene glycol; NMN, normetanephrine; PAH, phenylalanine hydroxylase; PLP, pyridoxal phosphate; PNMT, phenylethanolamine N-methyltransferase; TH, tyrosine hydroxylase; TPH, tryptophan hydroxylase. From a review by Gyrid Nygaard et al., 2021.

Tyrosine hydroxylase deficiency (THD) is a disorder caused by disfunction of tyrosine hydroxylase, an enzyme involved in the biosynthesis of dopamine. This condition is one of the causes of dopa-responsive dystonia.

In the case of True Segawa’s syndrome this dopa-responsive dystonia is not neurodegenerative when observed, nor is it typically a progressive disease process. It also typically does not result in significant disability. The condition typically responds significantly to Levodopa at very low clinical doses, typically resulting in improved symptoms at a dose of half ½ that of Levodopa which is employed in Parkinson’s disease (on average,100mg 3x a day with the presence of a dopamine decarboxylase inhibitor). Notably even when treatment is withheld for extended periods of time there is no progressive worsening of disability over time. Most patients exhibit a full recovery and many go on to not have symptoms even when the medication is not even active.

== Symptoms and signs ==
Patients present with symptoms reflecting the decreased production of dopamine: hypokinetic-rigid syndrome, dystonia, complex encephalopathy. Symptom severity and age at onset are highly variable. A review published on GeneReviews and last updated in 2017 suggests the approximate subdivision of patients into three groups based on differences in severity of symptoms, nature of symptoms, and age at onset. A review published more recently, in 2021, suggests that the disease may have a more gradual and overlapping spectrum, and categorization may be imprecise.

According to the classification on GeneReviews, three approximate phenotypes could be discerned:

- 1. TH-deficient dopa-responsive dystonia - the mildest phenotype with onset between 1 and 12 years of age, with its initial symptoms being lower-limb dystonia and/or difficulty in walking. Symptoms may gradually worsen over the day and become less pronounced after a period of rest.
- 2. TH-deficient infantile parkinsonism with motor delay - the intermediate phenotype, with onset between 3 and 12 months of age. Development of motor skills is visibly delayed, and trunkal hypotonia and parkinsonism are present.
- 3. TH-deficient progressive infantile encephalopathy - the most severe phenotype, with onset recognisable at the fetal stage of development. There is pronounced delay of motor development, truncal hypotonia, marked hypokinesia, limb hypertonia, hyperreflexia, oculogyric crises, ptosis, intellectual disability, and paroxysmal periods of lethargy (with increased sweating and drooling) alternating with irritability.

Exhibiting a distinctive pathology where levodopa seemingly builds up in the system or more accurately entrains the striatal system, this results in an astonishing lack of symptoms even when the levodopa has since passed its active stage. This is distinct from Parkinsonian Pathology where the lack of the drug being active in the system results in an onset of “off-time” or a period of time where the Parkinsonian Symptoms are worse than if the patient had not consumed the levodopa. Typically these off periods are also associated with worsened dystonic reactions and can pose a risk to muscle groups such as the calf muscles and biceps too tearing from active dystonia, and another effect primary to Parkinsonian pathology is both peak dose; and offset dyskinesia. Where the patient may exhibit involuntary movements either at the peak concentration of levodopa, or following immediately as the levodopa wears off. This is usually a result of long term therapy of levodopa in this population with a predisposed dopamine deficiency in their nigrostriatal section of the brain.

== Diagnosis ==
In order to diagnose tyrosine hydroxylase deficiency, a sample of the patient's cerebrospinal fluid may be obtained to assess neurotransmitter metabolites that may be affected, as illustrated by the metabolic links in Figure 1. Patients typically have normal levels of 5-hydroxyindolacetic acid (5HIAA), low levels of homovanillic acid (HVA) and 3-methoxy-4-hydroxyphenylethylene glycol (MHPG), and a low HVA:5-HIAA ratio. Upon finding a pattern of CSF abrormalities suggestive of the disease, the diagnosis may be confirmed by analysing the TH gene encoding the enzyme.

According to a review of dopa-responsive dystonias published in 2021, tyrosine hydroxylase deficiency may be hard to diagnose, with a median diagnostic delay of 4 years, and misdiagnosis happens in a significant proportion of patients, with cerebral palsy being the most common erroneous diagnosis.

== Treatment ==
Patients with tyrosine hydroxylase deficiency are treated with L-dopa in conjunction with decarboxylase inhibitors. A significant percentage of patients do not achieve a complete response on this regimen.

== History ==
The first case reports of "Segawa syndrome" and parkinsonism caused by mutations in the tyrosine hydroxylase gene were published in 1995 and 1996. Differing names:

Segawa Syndrome; Segawa’s Disease; Segawa’s Dystonia;

== Alternative names ==
- Autosomal recessive Segawa syndrome (autosomal dominant Segawa syndrome affects a different gene, GCH1)
- DYT/PARK-TH - designation in accordance with the Nomenclature of Genetic Movement Disorders maintained by the International Parkinson and Movement Disorder Society
- Dopa-responsive dystonia 5b, DYT5b
