= 3,4-dihydroxy-2-butanone-4-phosphate synthase =

Class of enzymes

DHBP_synthase
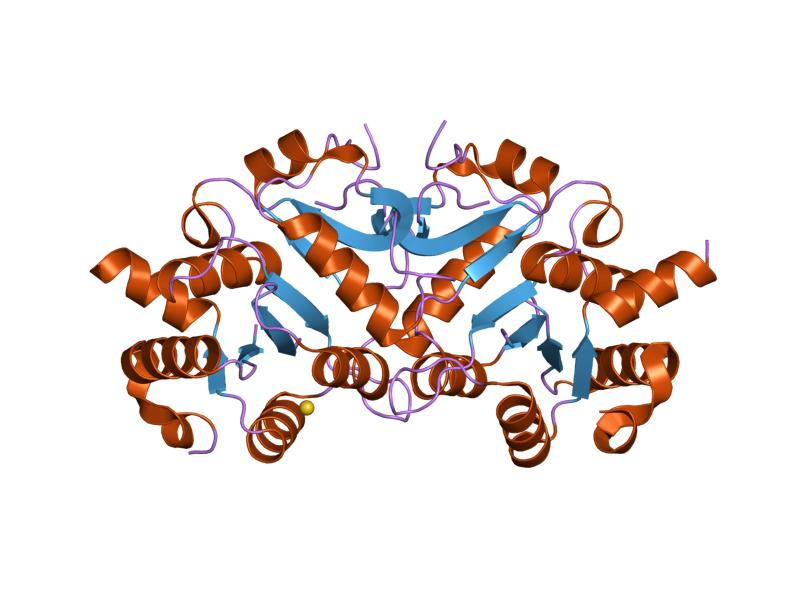
- crystal structure of 3,4-dihydroxy-2-butanone 4-phosphate synthase gold derivative

Identifiers
- Symbol: DHBP_synthase
- Pfam: PF00926
- InterPro: IPR000422
- SCOP2: 1iez / SCOPe / SUPFAM
Available protein structures:
- PDB: IPR000422 PF00926 (ECOD; PDBsum)
- AlphaFold: IPR000422; PF00926

The enzyme 3,4-dihydroxy-2-butanone 4-phosphate synthase (DHBP synthase) (RibB) EC 4.1.99.12 catalyses the conversion of D-ribulose 5-phosphate to formate and 3,4-dihydroxy-2-butanone 4-phosphate, the latter serving as the biosynthetic precursor for the xylene ring of riboflavin. In Photobacterium leiognathi, the riboflavin synthesis genes ribB (DHBP synthase), ribE (riboflavin synthase), ribH (lumazine synthase) and ribA (GTP cyclohydrolase II) all reside in the lux operon. RibB is sometimes found as a bifunctional enzyme with GTP cyclohydrolase II that catalyses the first committed step in the biosynthesis of riboflavin. No sequences with significant homology to DHBP synthase are found in the metazoa.
