= GTP cyclohydrolase I =

Class of enzymes

GCH1
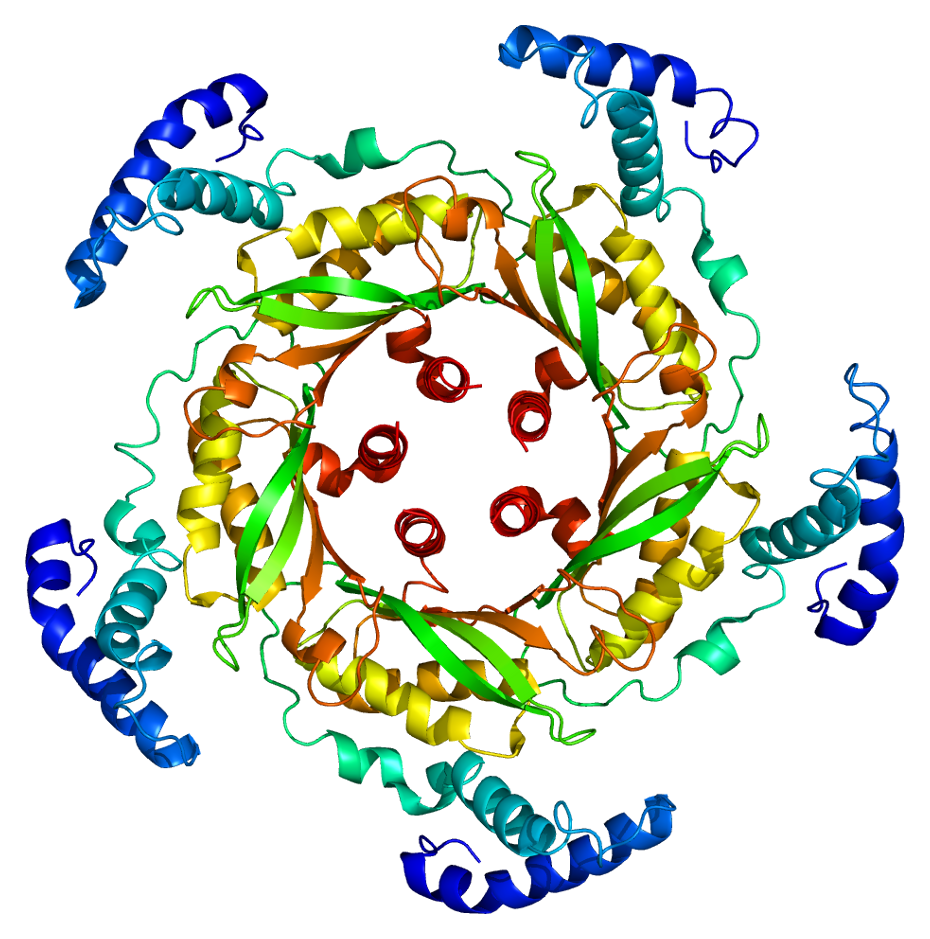

Identifiers
- Aliases: GCH1, DYT14, DYT5, DYT5a, GCH, GTP-CH-1, GTPCH1, HPABH4B, GTP cyclohydrolase 1
- External IDs: OMIM: 600225; MGI: 95675; GeneCards: GCH1
Available structures
PDB	Ortholog search: PDBe RCSB
PDB	List of PDB id codes 1FB1
Enzyme activity
EC #	BRENDA	ExPASy	KEGG	MetaCyc
3.5.4.16	↗	↗	↗	↗

Gene location (Human)
Chr.	Chromosome 14 (human)
Band	14q22.2	Start	54,842,008 bp
Band	14q22.2	End	54,902,826 bp

Gene location (Mouse)
Chr.	Chromosome 14 (mouse)
Band	14 C1|14 24.6 cM	Start	47,391,352 bp
Band	14 C1|14 24.6 cM	End	47,426,870 bp
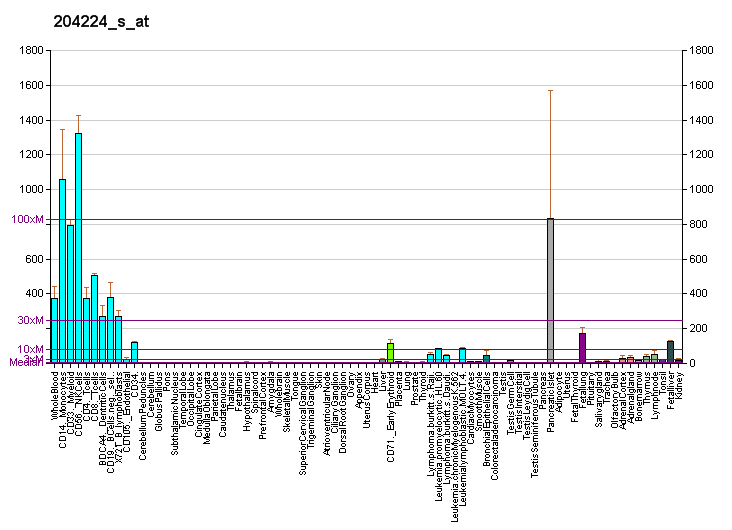
RNA expression pattern
Bgee	Human / Mouse (ortholog); Top expressed in: secondary oocyte; beta cell; jejunal mucosa; kidney tubule; cartilage tissue; palpebral conjunctiva; mononuclear cell; monocyte; epithelium of nasopharynx; right lobe of liver / Top expressed in: superior cervical ganglion; pineal gland; left lobe of liver; islet of Langerhans; zygote; gastrula; pyloric antrum; secondary oocyte; cumulus cell; tibiofemoral joint; More reference expression data
BioGPS	More reference expression data
Gene ontology
Molecular function	nucleotide binding; calcium ion binding; protein homodimerization activity; zinc ion binding; GTP binding; metal ion binding; protein binding; catalytic activity; hydrolase activity; GTP cyclohydrolase I activity; mitogen-activated protein kinase binding; GTPase activity; GTP-dependent protein binding; translation initiation factor binding
Cellular component	cytoplasm; cytosol; nuclear membrane; nucleoplasm; cytoplasmic vesicle; nucleus; neuron projection terminus; protein-containing complex
Biological process	nitric oxide biosynthetic process; response to interferon-gamma; neuromuscular process controlling posture; protein heterooligomerization; negative regulation of blood pressure; dopamine biosynthetic process; regulation of lung blood pressure; vasodilation; pteridine-containing compound biosynthetic process; 7,8-dihydroneopterin 3'-triphosphate biosynthetic process; dihydrobiopterin metabolic process; regulation of blood pressure; response to tumor necrosis factor; tetrahydrofolate biosynthetic process; response to lipopolysaccharide; positive regulation of nitric-oxide synthase activity; response to pain; tetrahydrobiopterin biosynthetic process; metabolism; protein homooligomerization; regulation of removal of superoxide radicals; positive regulation of heart rate; protein-containing complex assembly
Sources:Amigo / QuickGO
Orthologs
Databases	NCBI: entry; OMA: entry
Species	Human	Mouse
Entrez	2643	14528
Ensembl	ENSG00000131979	ENSMUSG00000037580
UniProt	P30793	Q05915
RefSeq (mRNA)	NM_000161; NM_001024024; NM_001024070; NM_001024071	NM_008102
RefSeq (protein)	NP_000152; NP_001019195; NP_001019241; NP_001019242	NP_032128
Location (UCSC)	Chr 14: 54.84 – 54.9 Mb	Chr 14: 47.39 – 47.43 Mb
PubMed search
- Wikidata
View/Edit Human	View/Edit Mouse

GTP cyclohydrolase I (GTPCH) (EC 3.5.4.16) is a member of the GTP cyclohydrolase family of enzymes. GTPCH is part of the folate and biopterin biosynthesis pathways. It is responsible for the hydrolysis of guanosine triphosphate (GTP) to form 7,8-dihydroneopterin triphosphate (7,8-DHNP-3'-TP, 7,8-NH_{2}-3'-TP).

== Gene ==
GTPCH is encoded by the gene GCH1. Several alternatively spliced transcript variants encoding different isoforms have been described; however, not all of the variants give rise to a functional enzyme.

== Function ==
GTP cyclohydrolase I

Identifiers
- EC no.: 3.5.4.16
- CAS no.: 37289-19-3

Databases
- BRENDA: enzyme data
- ExPASy: NiceZyme view
- KEGG: enzyme entry
- MetaCyc: metabolic pathway
- Rhea: reactions
- PDB structures: RCSB PDB PDBe PDBsum
- Gene Ontology: AmiGO / QuickGO
Search
- PMC: articles
- PubMed: articles
- NCBI: proteins

The transcribed protein is the first and rate-limiting enzyme in tetrahydrobiopterin (THB) biosynthesis, catalyzing the hydrolysis of guanosine triphosphate to 7,8-dihydroneopterin triphosphate, with formic acid as a byproduct. The mechanism of this reaction involves an Amadori rearrangement. THB is an essential cofactor required by the aromatic amino acid hydroxylase and nitric oxide synthase enzymes in the biosynthesis of the monoamine neurotransmitters serotonin, melatonin, dopamine, norepinephrine (noradrenaline), and epinephrine (adrenaline), and nitric oxide, respectively.

guanosine triphosphate
H_{2}O
HCO_{2}H
7,8-dihydroneopterin triphosphate

GTPCH and tetrahydrobiopterin were found to protect against cell death by ferroptosis. Tetrahydrobiopterin acts as a potent, diffusable antioxidant that resists oxidative stress and enables cancer cell survival.

== Clinical significance ==
At least 94 disease-causing mutations in this gene have been discovered. Mutations in this gene are associated with two disorders: autosomal recessive GTP cyclohydrolase I deficiency and autosomal dominant GTP cyclohydrolase I deficiency. These may present with malignant phenylketonuria (PKU) and hyperphenylalaninemia (HPA) and lead to a lack of certain neurotransmitters (dopamine, norepinephrine, epinephrine and serotonin). The dominant form, with mutation in only one of the two alleles for GTP cyclohydrolase I, causes dopamine-responsive dystonia, characterized by childhood-onset dystonia. Patients with the recessive form have mutations in both alleles for GTP cyclohydrolase I. Patients present with developmental delays and neurological dysfunction with trunk hypotonia, hypertonia of the extremities, abnormal movements, tremors, convulsions, and sometimes autonomic dysfunction. Response to treatment is variable and the long-term and functional outcome is unknown. To provide a basis for improving the understanding of the epidemiology, genotype/phenotype correlation and outcome of these diseases their impact on the quality of life of patients, and for evaluating diagnostic and therapeutic strategies a patient registry was established by the noncommercial International Working Group on Neurotransmitter Related Disorders (iNTD).

== See also ==
- Vitamin B_{9} (folic acid → folate)
