= 6-pyruvoyltetrahydropterin 2'-reductase =

Class of enzymes

Identifiers
- EC no.: 1.1.1.220
- CAS no.: 97089-79-7

Databases
- IntEnz: IntEnz view
- BRENDA: BRENDA entry
- ExPASy: NiceZyme view
- KEGG: KEGG entry
- MetaCyc: metabolic pathway
- PRIAM: profile
- PDB structures: RCSB PDB PDBe PDBsum
- Gene Ontology: AmiGO / QuickGO
Search
- PMC: articles
- PubMed: articles
- NCBI: proteins

In enzymology, a 6-pyruvoyltetrahydropterin 2'-reductase (EC 1.1.1.220) is an enzyme that catalyzes the chemical reaction

6-lactoyl-5,6,7,8-tetrahydropterin + NADP^{+} $\rightleftharpoons$ 6-pyruvoyltetrahydropterin + NADPH + H^{+}

Thus, the two substrates of this enzyme are 6-lactoyl-5,6,7,8-tetrahydropterin and NADP^{+}, whereas its 3 products are 6-pyruvoyltetrahydropterin, NADPH, and H^{+}.

This enzyme belongs to the family of oxidoreductases, specifically those acting on the CH-OH group of donor with NAD^{+} or NADP^{+} as acceptor. The systematic name of this enzyme class is 6-lactoyl-5,6,7,8-tetrahydropterin:NADP^{+} 2'-oxidoreductase. Other names in common use include 6-pyruvoyltetrahydropterin reductase, 6PPH4(2'-oxo) reductase, 6-pyruvoyl tetrahydropterin (2'-oxo)reductase, 6-pyruvoyl-tetrahydropterin 2'-reductase, and pyruvoyl-tetrahydropterin reductase. This enzyme participates in folate biosynthesis.
