= 2,5-diamino-6-(ribosylamino)-4(3H)-pyrimidinone 5'-phosphate reductase =

Class of enzymes

Identifiers
- EC no.: 1.1.1.302

Databases
- IntEnz: IntEnz view
- BRENDA: BRENDA entry
- ExPASy: NiceZyme view
- KEGG: KEGG entry
- MetaCyc: metabolic pathway
- PRIAM: profile
- PDB structures: RCSB PDB PDBe PDBsum
Search
- PMC: articles
- PubMed: articles
- NCBI: proteins

2,5-diamino-6-(ribosylamino)-4(3H)-pyrimidinone 5'-phosphate reductase (EC 1.1.1.302, 2,5-diamino-6-ribosylamino-4(3H)-pyrimidinone 5'-phosphate reductase, MjaRED, MJ0671 (gene)) is an enzyme with systematic name 2,5-diamino-6-(5-phospho-D-ribosylamino)pyrimidin-4(3H)-one:NAD(P)^{+} oxidoreductase. This enzyme catalyses the following chemical reaction

2,5-diamino-6-(5-phosphono)ribitylamino-4(3H)-pyrimidinone
+ NAD^{+}
H^{+}
H^{+}
2,5-diamino-6-hydroxy-4-(5-phosphoribosylamino)pyrimidine
+ NADH

The reaction proceeds in the opposite direction. A step in riboflavin biosynthesis, NADPH and NADH functions equally well as a reductant.
