= 6-Pyruvoyltetrahydropterin synthase =

Class of enzymes

6-pyruvoyltetrahydropterin synthase
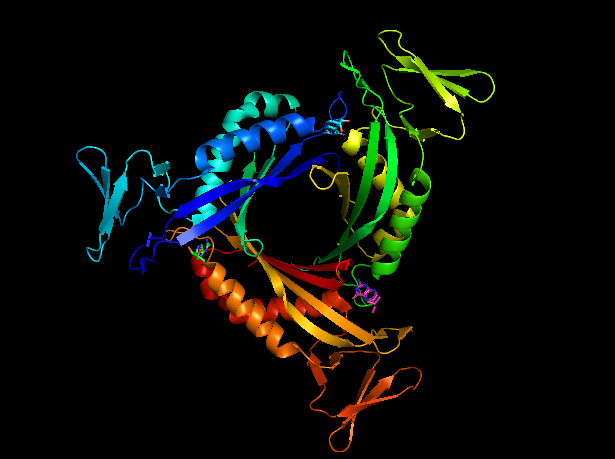
- PTPS enzyme pymol pretty

Identifiers
- EC no.: 4.2.3.12
- CAS no.: 97089-82-2

Databases
- BRENDA: enzyme data
- ExPASy: NiceZyme view
- KEGG: enzyme entry
- MetaCyc: metabolic pathway
- Rhea: reactions
- PDB structures: RCSB PDB PDBe PDBsum
- Gene Ontology: AmiGO / QuickGO
Search
- PMC: articles
- PubMed: articles
- NCBI: proteins

The enzyme 6-pyruvoyltetrahydropterin synthase (EC 4.2.3.12, PTPS) catalyzes the following chemical reaction:

7,8-Dihydroneopterin 3′-triphosphate $\rightleftharpoons$ 6-pyruvoyltetrahydropterin + triphosphate

PTPS catalyzed synthesis of 6-pyruvoyltetrahyrdopterin

This reaction is the second step (shown above) in the biosynthesis of tetrahydrobiopterin from GTP. Tetrahydrobiopterin is used as a cofactor in the reactions catalyzed by aromatic amino acid monooxygenases, nitric oxide synthase and glyceryl-ether monooxygenase. PTPS converts 7,8-dihydroneopterin triphosphate to 6-pyruvoyltetrahydropterin (PTP) through the loss of the triphosphate group, a stereospecific reduction of the double bond between the top right nitrogen and carbon in the ring on the triphosphate on the right, the oxidation of the hydroxyl groups located on the first and second carbons of the side chain, and an internal base-catalyzed hydrogen transfer. ^{]} 6-pyruvoyltetrahydropterin synthase (PTPS) can be found in the cytoplasm as well as the nucleus of cells according to immunohistochemical studies conducted. It has also been found that in higher species 6-pyruvoyltetrahydropterin synthase (PTPS) can undergo post-translational modification.

This enzyme participates in tetrahydrobiopterin biosynthesis.

== Nomenclature ==
This enzyme belongs to the family of lyases, to be specific, those carbon-oxygen lyases acting on phosphates. The systematic name of this enzyme class is 6-[(1S,2R)-1,2-dihydroxy-3′-triphosphooxypropyl]-7,8-dihydropterin triphosphate-lyase (6-pyruvoyl-5,6,7,8-tetrahydropterin-forming). Other names in common use include 2-amino-4-oxo-6-[(1S,2R)-1,2-dihydroxy-3-triphosphooxypropyl]-7,8-, and dihydroxypteridine triphosphate lyase.

== Structure ==
6-pyruvoyltetrahydropterin synthase (PTPS) is a hexamer with D3 symmetry, and dimensions 60 × 60 × 60 A ̊. It is composed of identical subunits formed from a dimer of trimers. A 12-stranded antiparallel b-barrel is formed by the trimer of dimers and creates a pore within PTPS, with a 6 to 12 A ̊ diameter. The trimers are connected by contact between the β-sheets of monomers, which are perpendicular to each other, separated by less than 4 Angstroms, and connected in three locations residues 20–24, 48–51, and 89–91.

One enzymatic active site is located where the three monomers come together in each subunit of the hexamer. Three histidine residues: His23, His48 and His50 create a transition metal binding site where Zn(II) binds and is the cause of enzymatic activity in the center of the pore. Above the Zn(II) ion are GluA133 and CysA42, which are catalytically important because they are close to the metal but do not bind to it. The lack of binding implies that the substrate binds to the Zn(II) inside the pore during catalysis.

== Genetics ==
This enzyme 6-pyruvoyltetrahydropterin synthase is encoded by the PTS gene. A mutation in the 6-PTS gene may be the cause of a hereditary dystonic disorder. There have been four mutations of the 6-PTS gene found. The mutations include two homozygous mutations, R25Q and I114V, and two compound heterozygous mutations, R16C and K120stop. The deficiency is only associated with the recessive gene being passed on from parent to child.

== Clinical significance ==
6-Pyruvoyltetrahydropterin synthase deficiency is the most common cause of a deficiency of tetrahydrobiopterin. Tetrahydrobiopterin deficiency leads to hyperphenylalaninemia and the inability to make neurotransmitters such as dopamine and serotonin. PTPS deficiency has been shown to lead to severe mental retardation, delayed motor development, and seizures. Low levels of tetrahydrobiopterin production, opposed to near complete lack of tetrahydrobiopterin may cause fluctuations in the symptoms experienced throughout the day.
