= Cyclin-dependent kinase =

Class of enzymes

Identifiers
- EC no.: 2.7.11.22

Databases
- BRENDA: enzyme data
- ExPASy: NiceZyme view
- KEGG: enzyme entry
- MetaCyc: metabolic pathway
- Rhea: reactions
- PDB structures: RCSB PDB PDBe PDBsum
Search
- PMC: articles
- PubMed: articles
- NCBI: proteins

Tertiary structure of human Cdk2, determined by X-ray crystallography. Like other protein kinases, Cdk2 is composed of two lobes: a smaller amino-terminal lobe (top) that is composed primarily of beta sheet and the PSTAIRE helix, and a large carboxy-terminal lobe (bottom) that is primarily made up of alpha helices. The ATP substrate is shown as a ball-and-stick model, located deep within the active-site cleft between the two lobes. The phosphates are oriented outward, toward the mouth of the cleft, which is blocked in this structure by the T-loop (highlighted in green). (PDB 1hck)

Cyclin-dependent kinases (CDKs) are a group of serine/threonine protein kinases involved in the regulation of the cell cycle. These enzymes function as upstream regulators of cellular processes such as transcription, DNA repair, metabolism, and epigenetic regulation, in response to extracellular and intracellular signals. They are present in all known eukaryotes, and their regulatory function in the cell cycle has been evolutionarily conserved.

CDKs are named for the cyclins, protein activators of CDKs that become mobilized at different points in the cell cycle. Dysregulation of CDK activity is linked to diseases including cancer, neurodegenerative diseases, and stroke.

== CDKs and cyclins in the cell cycle ==
The activation of CDKs requires binding to cyclins and phosphorylation. This phosphorylation typically occurs on a specific threonine residue, leading to a conformational change in the CDK that enhances its kinase activity. The activation forms a cyclin-CDK complex which phosphorylates specific regulatory proteins that are required to initiate steps in the cell-cycle.

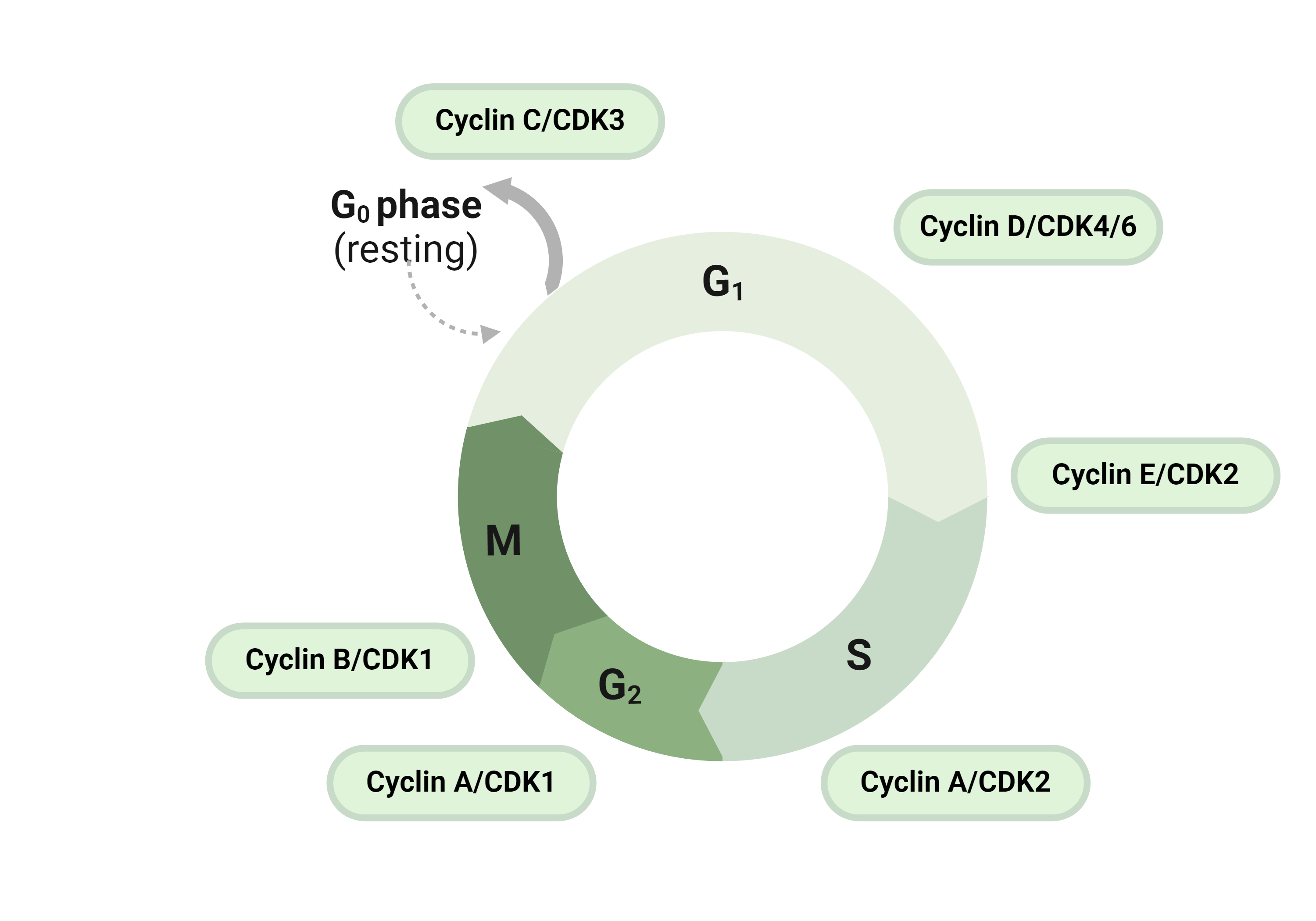
Schematic of CDKs/cyclins the cell cycle. M = Mitosis; G1 = Gap phase 1; S = Synthesis; G2 = Gap phase 2

In human cells, the CDK family comprises 20 different members that play a crucial role in the regulation of the cell cycle and transcription. These are usually separated into cell-cycle CDKs, which regulate cell-cycle transitions and cell division, and transcriptional CDKs, which mediate gene transcription. CDK1, CDK2, CDK3, CDK4 and CDK6 are directly related to the regulation of cell-cycle events, while CDK7 – 13 are associated with transcriptional regulation. Different cyclin-CDK complexes regulate different phases of the cell cycle, known as G0/G1, S, G2, and M phases, featuring several checkpoints to maintain genomic stability and ensure accurate DNA replication. Cyclin-CDK complexes of earlier cell-cycle phase help activate cyclin-CDK complexes in later phases.

Cell-cycle CDKs, their cyclin partners, and their functions in the human
CDK	Cyclin partner	Established functions
CDK1	cyclin B	M phase transition
CDK2	cyclin A	S/G2 transition
CDK2	cyclin E	G1/S transition
CDK3	cyclin C	G0/G1 and G1/S transitions
CDK4, CDK6	cyclin D	G1/S transition. Phosphorylation of retinoblastoma gene product (Rb)
CDK7	cyclin H	CAK and RNAPII transcription

== CDK structure and activation ==
CDKs mainly consist of an N-terminal and a C-terminal lobe with distinct functions. The N-terminal lobe (N-lobe) contains a glycine-rich inhibitory loop and a so-called C helix that binds cyclins. The C-terminal lobe (C-lobe) contains the phosphorylation site (T160 in CDK2) and serves as a binding platform for substrate proteins.

=== Cyclin and substrate binding ===
The active site of a CDK catalyzes transfer of phosphate from ATP to a Ser or Thr residue on a substrate protein. When cyclin is not bound, the activation loop covers the cleft containing the active site, preventing substrate binding. When cyclin is bound, two alpha helices change position to enable ATP binding, in addition to the movement of the activation loop.

There is considerable specificity in the binding of cyclins to CDKs. In addition to activating the CDKs, cyclins can directly bind the substrate or localize the CDK to a subcellular area where the substrate is found. For example, cyclin B1 and B2 can localize CDK1 to the nucleus and the Golgi, respectively, through a localization sequence outside the CDK-binding region.

=== Phosphorylation ===
Cyclin binding alone causes partial activation of Cdks, but complete activation also requires activating phosphorylation by a CAK. In animal cells, CAK phosphorylates the Cdk subunit only after cyclin binding, as shown here. Budding yeast contains a different version of CAK that can phosphorylate the Cdk even in the absence of cyclin, and so the two activation steps can occur in either order.

CDKs may be either activated or inhibited by phosphorylation. Activation involves phosphorylation on a threonine adjacent to the CDK's active site. The identity of the CDK-activating kinase (CAK) that carries out this phosphorylation varies among different model organisms. The timing of this phosphorylation also varies; in mammalian cells, the activating phosphorylation occurs after cyclin binding, while in yeast cells, it occurs before cyclin binding. CAK activity is not regulated by known cell cycle pathways, and it is the cyclin binding that is the limiting step for CDK activation.

Unlike activating phosphorylation, CDK inhibitory phosphorylation is crucial for cell cycle regulation by inhibiting cell cycle progression in response to events like DNA damage. The phosphorylation state of CDKs is controlled by kinases and phosphatases such as WEE1 kinases, Myt1 kinases, and Cdc25c phosphatases for CDK1. Inhibitory phosphorylation does not significantly alter the CDK structure, but reduces its affinity for the substrate protein.

=== CDK inhibitors ===
A cyclin-dependent kinase inhibitor (CKI) is a protein that interacts with a cyclin-CDK complex to inhibit kinase activity, often during G1 phase or in response to external signals or DNA damage. In animal cells, two primary CKI families exist: the INK4 family (p16, p15, p18, p19) and the CIP/KIP family (p21, p27, p57). The INK4 family proteins specifically bind to and inhibit CDK4 and CDK6 by D-type cyclins or by CAK, while the CIP/KIP family prevent the activation of CDK-cyclin heterodimers, disrupting both cyclin binding and kinase activity. These inhibitors have a KID (kinase inhibitory domain) at the N-terminus, facilitating their attachment to cyclins and CDKs. Their primary function occurs in the nucleus, supported by a C-terminal sequence that enables their nuclear translocation.

In yeast and Drosophila, CKIs are strong inhibitors of S- and M-CDK, but do not inhibit G1/S-CDKs. During G1, high levels of CKIs prevent cell cycle events from occurring out of order, but do not prevent transition through the Start checkpoint, which is initiated through G1/S-CDKs. Once the cell cycle is initiated, phosphorylation by early G1/S-CDKs leads to destruction of CKIs, relieving inhibition on later cell cycle transitions. In mammalian cells, the CKI regulation works differently. Mammalian protein p27 (Dacapo in Drosophila) inhibits G1/S- and S-CDKs but does not inhibit S- and M-CDKs.

=== CDK subunits (CKS) ===
CDKs can additionally be regulated by the cyclin-dependent kinase regulatory subunit (CKSs) proteins (contrary to the name, CKSs are individual proteins, not subunits of a larger protein). In mammalian cells, two CKSs are known: CKS1 and CKS2. These proteins are necessary for the proper functioning of CDKs, although their exact functions are not yet fully known. An interaction occurs between CKS1 and the carboxy-terminal lobe of CDKs, where they bind together. This binding increases the affinity of the cyclin-CDK complex for its substrates, especially those with multiple phosphorylation sites, thus contributing the promotion of cell proliferation.

=== Non-cyclin activators ===
Several proteins other than cyclins can activate CDKs. For instance, certain viruses encode proteins with sequence homology to cyclins. One much-studied example is K-cyclin (or v-cyclin) from Kaposi sarcoma herpes virus, which activates CDK6. The vCyclin-CDK6 complex promotes an accelerated transition from G1 to S phase. This leads to the removal of inhibition on Cyclin E–CDK2's enzymatic activity and promotes transformation and tumorigenesis. During neuronal differentiation, CDK5 is activated by the p35 and p39 proteins. This activation is important in growth of the dendritic spine and in synapse formation. The RINGO/Speedy proteins can also activate CDKs (primarily CDK1 and 2), despite lacking homology to cyclins. These proteins alter the substrate specificity of the CDKs in addition to regulating activity.

== Medical significance ==
=== CDKs and cancer ===
Because of their roles in cell cycle regulation, CDKs are of great interest in cancer. Research has shown that alterations in cyclins, CDKs, and CDK inhibitors are common in cancers.

The dysregulation of the CDK4/6-RB pathway is a common feature in many cancers, often resulting from various mechanisms that inactivate the cyclin D-CDK4/6 complex. Several signals can lead to overexpression of cyclin D and enhance CDK4/6 activity, contributing toward tumorigenesis. Additionally, the CDK4/6-RB pathway interacts with the p53 signaling pathway via p21CIP1 transcription, which can inhibit both cyclin D-CDK4/6 and cyclin E-CDK2 complexes. Mutations in p53 can deactivate the G1 checkpoint, further promoting uncontrolled proliferation.

=== CDK inhibitors and therapeutic potential ===
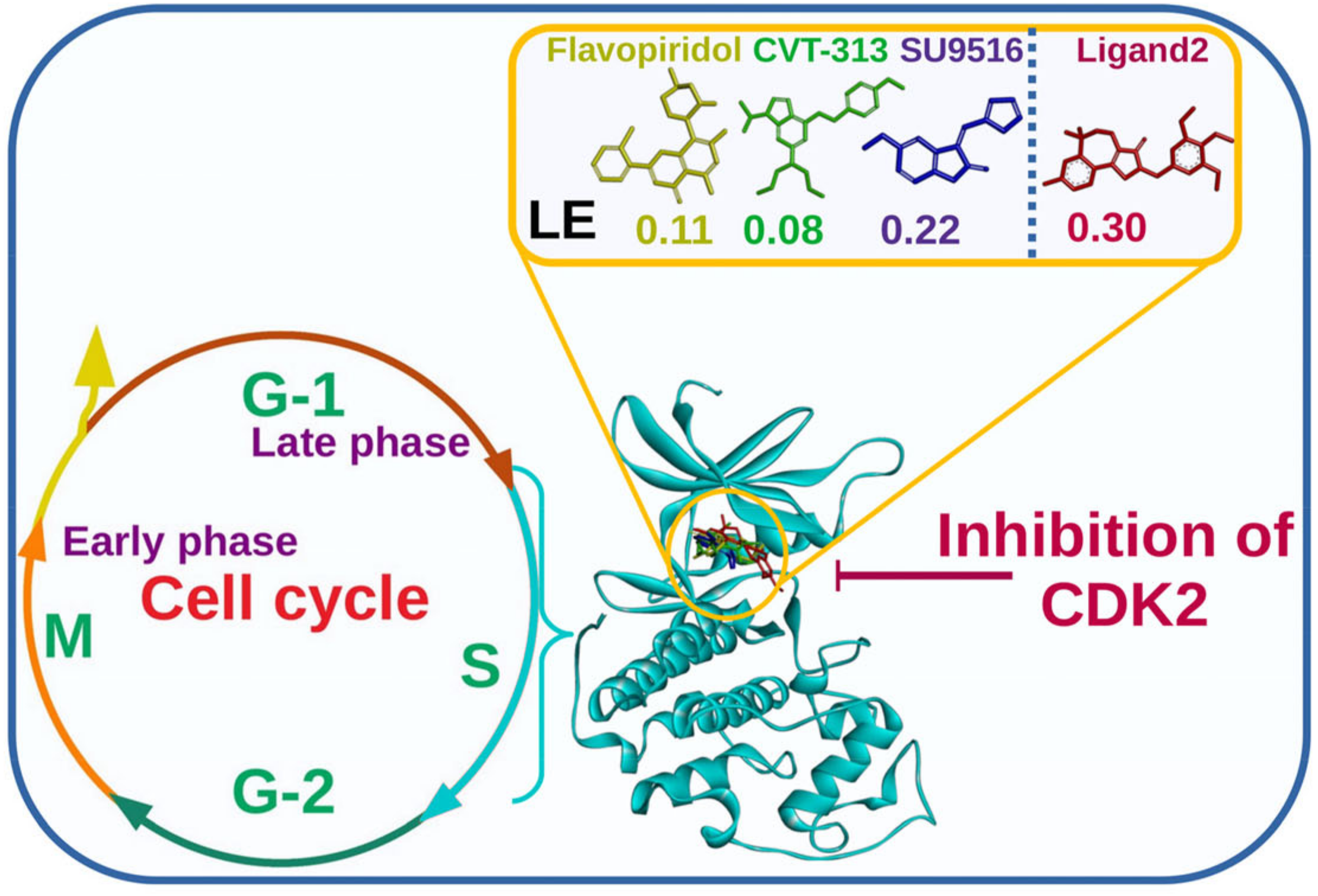
Roles of various CDK inhibitor drugs in cell cycle regulation

Numerous synthetic inhibitors of CDKs have been explored for potential therapeutic benefit in cancer. Palbociclib, one of the first CDK4/6 inhibitors approved by the FDA, has become essential in the treatment of HR+/HER2- advanced or metastatic breast cancer, often in combination with endocrine therapy. Ribociclib, demonstrating similar efficacy to palbociclib, is also approved for HR+/HER2- advanced breast cancer. Abemaciclib may be used in monotherapy, in addition to combination treatment, for certain HR+/HER2- breast cancer patients, including patients with brain metastases. Trilaciclib is used to decrease myelosuppression associated with chemotherapy with other drugs.

Cyclin-dependent kinase inhibitor drugs
Drug	CDKs Inhibited	Condition or disease
Flavopiridol (alvocidib)	1, 2, 4, 6, 9	Acute Myeloid Leukemia (AML)
Roscovitine (Seliciclib)	2, 7, 9	Pituitary Cushing Disease Cystic Fibrosis, Advanced Solid Tumors Lung Cancer
Dinaclib	1, 2, 5, 9	Chronic Lymphocytic Leukemia (CLL) Breast and Lung Cancers
Milciclib	1, 2, 4, 7	Hepatocellular Carcinoma (HCC) Thymic Carcinoma
Palbociclib	4, 6	Breast Cancer Head and Neck, Brain, Colon, and other Solid Cancers
Ribociclib	4, 6	HR+/HER2- Breast Cancer Prostate, and other Solid Cancers
Abemaciclib	4, 6	HR+/HER2- Breast Cancer Lung, Brain, Colon, and other Solid Cancers
Meriolin	1, 2, 5, 9	Neuroblastoma, Glioma, Myeloma, Colon Cancer
Variolin B	1, 2, 5, 9	Murine Leukemia
Roniciclib	1, 2, 4, 7, 9	Lung and Advanced Solid Cancers
Meridianin E	1, 5, 9	Larynx Carcinoma Myeloid Leukemia
Nortopsentins	1	Malignant Pleural Mesothelioma (MPM)

Off-target effects are a significant concern with CDK-inhibiting drugs, as CDKs have roles in non-cancer processes including transcription, neural physiology, and glucose homeostasis.

== See also ==
- Cell cycle
- Protein kinase
- Enzyme catalysis
- Enzyme inhibitor
