= 6-Pyruvoyltetrahydropterin synthase deficiency =

- Other names: Hyperphenylalaninemia due to 6-pyruvoyltetrahydropterin synthase deficiency
- This condition is inherited in an autosomal recessive manner

6-Pyruvoyltetrahydropterin synthase deficiency is an autosomal recessive disorder that causes malignant hyperphenylalaninemia due to tetrahydrobiopterin deficiency. It is a recessive disorder that is accompanied by hyperphenylalaninemia. Commonly reported symptoms are initial truncal hypotonia, subsequent appendicular hypertonia, bradykinesia, cogwheel rigidity, generalized dystonia, and marked diurnal fluctuation. Other reported clinical features include difficulty in swallowing, oculogyric crises, somnolence, irritability, hyperthermia, and seizures. Chorea, athetosis, hypersalivation, rash with eczema, and sudden death have also been reported. Patients with mild phenotypes may deteriorate if given folate antagonists such as methotrexate, which can interfere with a salvage pathway through which dihydrobiopterin is converted into tetrahydrobiopterin via dihydrofolate reductase. Treatment options include substitution with neurotransmitter precursors (levodopa, 5-hydroxytryptophan), monoamine oxidase inhibitors, and tetrahydrobiopterin. Response to treatment is variable and the long-term and functional outcome is unknown. To provide a basis for improving the understanding of the epidemiology, genotype–phenotype correlation and outcome of these diseases, their impact on the quality of life of patients, and for evaluating diagnostic and therapeutic strategies a patient registry was established by the noncommercial International Working Group on Neurotransmitter Related Disorders (iNTD).

== Presentation ==
Movement disorders mentioned are caused by the inability to produce L-Dopa. Dopamine is a neurotransmitter which is also involved in movement. The absence of enough of this molecule causes the movement disorders in an affected individual.

== Mechanism ==
To understand how the absence of this enzyme affects the body, we must look at the BH_{4} synthesis pathway. PTPS is an intermediate in this cycle and is needed to convert 7,8 - dihydroneopterin triphosphate to 6-Pyruvoyltetrahydryobiopterin. 6-Pyruvoyltetrahydryobiopterin is converted into BH_{4} (Tetrahydrobiopterin), but since it stops at 6-Pyruvoyltetrahydrobiopterin no BH_{4} is made. The absence of BH_{4} affects the metabolism of Phenylalanine. This is the reason that PKU and PTPS deficiency share some similar symptoms. However, since BH_{4} is needed for much more than just the metabolism of Phenylalanine, there are other symptoms as well.

This image depicts the pathway for the synthesis of tetrahydrobiopterin, a very important cofactor in the human body.

=== Structure and function of 6-Pyruvoyltetrahydropterin Synthase ===
PTPS is a hexamer of identical subunits. The PTPS monomer folds into a sequential four-stranded, antiparallel 𝛃-sheet. Three PTPS monomers form a 12-stranded antiparallel 𝛃-barrel by tight association between the N and C terminus of 2 adjacent subunits. The active enzyme complex is formed by two trimers in a head-to-head fashion. The active site is in between the trimer-trimer interface and has 3 monomers: A, A′, B. There are three histidine residues that form the metal-binding site in the substrate binding pocket: His 23,48 and 50. Residues Cys42, Glu133, and His89 are in close proximity to the binding pocket but are not binding it. These are thought to serve as proton donors and acceptors during catalysis. The cofactor bound can be either Mg2+ or Ni2+ (Protein Database). As previously mentioned it is involved in the biosynthesis of BH4 and catalyzes the transformation of 7,8-dihydroneopterin triphosphate into 6-pyruvoyl tetrahydropterin synthase. The kinetic values for this enzyme are KM = 8.1 μM and Vmax = 120 nmol/min/mg. The structure of PTPS is unique and is different than other examples of antiparallel 𝛃-barrels. It is described as being formed by "a three-fold symmetrical arrangement of subunits". A similar 𝛃-barrel formation has been discovered in CKS2, the difference between PTPS and CKS2 is that the formation of the latter is metal induced and reversible. The PTPS trimer is similar to a porin and is hypothesized to serve as a tunnel for dihydroneopterin triphosphate.

== Diagnosis ==
PTPS deficiency can usually be detected by the same screening test used for PKU, because both disorders result in elevated levels of Phenylalanine. This test is known as the Guthrie test and is done on babies a few days after birth. Another diagnostic method is to measure Pteridine levels in urine and to measure neurotransmitters 5-hydroxyindolacetic acid (5-HIAA) and homovanillic acid (HVA).

== Epidemiology ==
Taiwanese Chinese are more likely to get PTPS deficiency as the prevalence in Taiwanese Chinese is about 1/132,000 compared to white individuals at about 1/1,000,000. PTPS deficiency occurs most commonly in Asian countries and this makes sense because of the incidence of this disease in Taiwanese Chinese being significantly higher than any other population.

== History ==
PTPS deficiency is not necessarily its own disease. It shares history with PKU and hyperphenylalaninemia (HPA) . Asbjørn Følling, a physician studying metabolic diseases, identified an excess of phenylpyruvate as the cause of a strange, musty odor from the urine of two Norwegian children. Further research by Penrose in 1935 lead to the coining of the term, "phenylketonuria". The foundations for dietary restrictions were laid down by George Jervis and Host Bickel which is still one of the best ways to treat PKU. However, this very practice of excluding phenylalanine from the diet was not working for other forms of HPA. This was attributed to a deficiency of tetrahydrobiopterin (BH4), a cofactor for PAH. The most common form of BH4 deficiency is due to PTPS. Later on PTPS was discovered and it was learned that PKU causes HPA but not all HPA is PKU.

== See also ==
- 6-pyruvoyltetrahydropterin synthase
