= 2-Amino-5-formylamino-6-(5-phospho-D-ribosylamino)pyrimidin-4(3H)-one =

2-Amino-5-formylamino-6-(5-phospho-d-ribosylamino)pyrimidin-4(3H)-one
- (1)

Names
- IUPAC name (1R)-1-[(2-Amino-5-formamido-6-oxo-1,6-dihydropyrimidin-4-yl)amino]-1,4-anhydro-D-ribitol 5-(dihydrogen phosphate)
- Systematic IUPAC name {(2R,3S,4R,5R)-5-[(2-Amino-5-formamido-6-oxo-1,6-dihydropyrimidin-4-yl)amino]-3,4-dihydroxyoxolan-2-yl}methyl dihydrogen phosphate
- Other names 2-Amino-5-formylamino-6-ribo-furanosylamino-4(3H)-pyrimidinone monophosphate; 2-Amino-5-formylamino-6-hydroxy-4-(5-phosphoribosylamino)pyrimidine

Identifiers
CAS Number	88299-87-0
3D model (JSmol)	Interactive image
ChemSpider	4574141
KEGG	C15563
PubChem CID	5460646
UNII	F6V4VP5MUP
CompTox Dashboard (EPA)	DTXSID201031466
- InChI: InChI=1S/C10H16N5O9P/c11-10-14-7(4(12-2-16)8(19)15-10)13-9-6(18)5(17)3(24-9)1-23-25(20,21)22/h2-3,5-6,9,17-18H,1H2,(H,12,16)(H2,20,21,22)(H4,11,13,14,15,19)/t3-,5-,6-,9-/m1/s1 Key: VKMYTDDVUBGBDH-UUOKFMHZSA-N
- SMILES: C([C@@H]1[C@H]([C@H]([C@@H](O1)NC2=C(C(=O)N=C(N2)N)NC=O)O)O)OP(=O)(O)O

Properties
Chemical formula	C_{10}H_{16}N_{5}O_{9}P
Molar mass	381.24 g/mol
- Except where otherwise noted, data are given for materials in their standard state (at 25 °C [77 °F], 100 kPa). Infobox references

2-Amino-5-formylamino-6-(5-phospho-d-ribosylamino)pyrimidin-4(3H)-one (1) is a metabolite in the riboflavin biosynthesis pathway. It is formed from guanosine triphosphate (GTP) by the enzyme GTP cyclohydrolase IIa which catalyzes the hydrolysis of the 8,9 bond in the guanine group and loss of the beta and gamma phosphate groups. The molecule is deformylated by 2-amino-5-formylamino-6-ribosylaminopyrimidin-4(3H)-one 5'-monophosphate deformylase as the second step in the archaeal riboflavin biosynthetic pathway.

guanosine triphosphate
(1)
(2)
