= Autosomal recessive GTP cyclohydrolase I deficiency =

- Specialty: Endocrinology

Autosomal recessive GTP cyclohydrolase I deficiency (AR-GTPCHD) is a disorder associated with the deficient operation of the enzyme GTP cyclohydrolase I. The condition leads to insufficient production of the cofactor tetrahydrobiopterin necessary for the proper synthesis of dopamine and serotonin and for maintenance of adequate levels of phenylalanine. As of 2020, autosomal recessive GTP cyclohydrolase I deficiency was one of the six known causes of tetrahydrobiopterin deficiency. It is also considered part of the spectrum of dopa-responsive dystonias.

== Symptoms and signs ==
Patients may present with developmental delay, axial hypotonia, delayed development of speech, or dysarthria. The list of possible motor disturbances includes dystonia, oculogyric crises, parkinsonism/hypokinesia. Patients may have a number of psychiatric symptoms.

Biochemically, patients present with hyperphenylalaninemia, and usually have decreased levels of biopterin and neopterin in urine and in dry blood spots.

== Treatment ==
According to a consensus guideline published in 2020, patients may be put on a phenylalanine-restricted diet to help bring down their elevated phenylalanine levels. To the same effect, and to normalise their production of neurotransmitters, they may be prescribed sapropterin, an artificially produced analogue of tetrahydrobiopterin. Another first-line drug in this disease is L-DOPA. Prescription of 5-hydroxytryptophan is also possible.

Prolonged therapy with large doses of L-DOPA may lead to the development of cerebral folate deficiency, therefore patients with decreased concentrations of 5-MTHF in their cerebrospinal fluid may be prescribed folinic acid, which efficiently penetrates the blood-cerebrospinal fluid barrier and helps restore the folate status.

== See also ==
- Autosomal dominant GTP cyclohydrolase I deficiency - a condition associated with mutations of the same gene, GTPCH1
