= Dyspropterin =

Names
- Preferred IUPAC name 1-(2-Amino-4-oxo-5,6,7,8-tetrahydro-1H-pteridin-6-yl)propane-1,2-dione
- Systematic IUPAC name 1-(2-Amino-4-oxo-1,4,5,6,7,8-hexahydropteridin-6-yl)propane-1,2-dione
- Other names 6-Pyruvoyltetrahydropterin; 6-PTHB

Identifiers
CAS Number	89687-39-8
3D model (JSmol)	Interactive image
Abbreviations	6-PTHB
ChEBI	CHEBI:17804
ChemSpider	559118 (6R); 114280
KEGG	C03684
MeSH	Dyspropterin
PubChem CID	644062 (6R); 128973 ()
UNII	M99D3F9HQF
CompTox Dashboard (EPA)	DTXSID601028813
- InChI: InChI=1S/C9H11N5O3/c1-3(15)6(16)4-2-11-7-5(12-4)8(17)14-9(10)13-7/h4,12H,2H2,1H3,(H4,10,11,13,14,17) Key: WBJZXBUVECZHCE-UHFFFAOYSA-N
- SMILES: CC(=O)C(=O)C1CNC2=C(N1)C(=O)N=C(N)N2

Properties
Chemical formula	C_{9}H_{11}N_{5}O_{3}
Molar mass	237.219 g·mol^{−1}
- Except where otherwise noted, data are given for materials in their standard state (at 25 °C [77 °F], 100 kPa). Infobox references

Dyspropterin (6-pyruvoyltetrahydropterin, 6-PTHB) is an intermediate in tetrahydrobiopterin biosynthesis. It is the product of the enzyme 6-pyruvoyltetrahydropterin synthase and the substrate of two enzymes, 6-pyruvoyltetrahydropterin 2'-reductase and sepiapterin reductase.

Dyspropterin exists in all living organisms, ranging from bacteria to humans. Dyspropterin has been detected, but not quantified in, a few different foods, such as ducks (Anatidae), chickens (Gallus gallus), and domestic pigs (Sus scrofa domestica). This could make dyspropterin a potential biomarker for the consumption of these foods.

== See also ==
- Tetrahydrobiopterin
