= Arkansas Farm Bureau Federation =

American non-profit grassroots organization

Arkansas Farm Bureau Federation (ArFB) is a non-profit, grassroots organization dedicated to agricultural advocacy. ArFB represents the interests of farmers and rural communities throughout the state of Arkansas through policy development, lobbying and other programs.

The mission of Arkansas Farm Bureau:

- Advocate the interests of agriculture in the public arena;
- Disseminate information concerning the value and importance of agriculture; and
- Provide products and services which improve the quality of life for its members.

Farm Bureau is an independent, voluntary organization of farm and ranch families united for the purpose of analyzing their problems and formulating action to achieve educational improvement, economic opportunity, social advancement and promote the national well-being. Farm Bureau is county, state, national and international in its scope and influence. Farm Bureau is nonpartisan, nonsectarian, nongovernmental and nonsecret in character.

== Past presidents and executive officers ==
Presidents	Years in this position
J. F. Tompkins	1935–36
R. E. Short	1936–48
Joe C. Hardin	1948–55
Harold F. Ohlendorf	1955–71
Morris L. Bowman	1971–76
Nicky E. Hargrove	1976–86
Andrew Whisenhunt	1986–99
David W. Hillman	1999–2003
Stanley E. Reed	2003–08
Randy Veach	2008–2019
Rich Hillman	2020–present

Executive Officers	Years in this position
Waldo Frasier	Executive Secretary 1935–55
	Executive Vice President 1955–70
	Vice President/CEO 1971
Arnold Berner	Executive Vice President 1970–82
Jack G. Justus	Executive Vice President 1982–97
Dennis Robertson	Executive Vice President 1997–2002
Ewell R. Welch	Executive Vice President 2002–2013
Rodney D. Baker	Executive Vice President 2013–2015
Warren Carter	Executive Vice President 2016–current

== Commodity divisions ==
Arkansas Farm Bureau has 12 commodity divisions. Those divisions give producers a channel for emphasis on problems relating directly to the commodities they raise. However, the commodity divisions also contribute to furthering the overall goals of Arkansas Farm Bureau. The following are the 12 commodity divisions represented in Arkansas Farm Bureau:

- Aquaculture
- Horticulture
- Beef cattle
- Poultry
- Cotton
- Rice
- Dairy
- Soybean
- Equine
- Swine
- Forestry
- Wheat and feed grains

== Valueplus ==
Arkansas Farm Bureau provides a number of discount programs for its members, collectively known as ValuePlus.

== Young farmers & ranchers ==
Arkansas Farm Bureau’s Young Farmers & Ranchers is an extension of a national program by the same name. Young Farmers & Ranchers is program designed to increase the participation of young men and women, between 18 and 35, in county and state level Farm Bureau Organizations, programs and events. The Young Farmers & Ranchers program also provides opportunities for young men and women to earn recognition for their achievements in agriculture, business and leadership through the Farm Bureau's Young Farmers & Ranchers Awards program and competitions. Competitive events offer unique opportunities for members to learn about Farm Bureau while earning recognition and prizes. These activities are a great way to learn, network and have fun. Within Arkansas Farm Bureau there are two main awards the YF&R Achievement Award and the YF&R Excellence in Ag Award. Arkansas Farm Bureau also holds a YF&R Discussion Meet competition yearly. The Young Farmers & Ranchers Discussion Meet competition simulates a committee meeting where discussion and active participation are expected from each participant.

== Women’s committee ==
This committee strongly encourages women to join and become active in Arkansas Farm Bureau at any of the various county and state levels. The women’s committee also supports community-based activities and programs such as Ag in the Classroom, farm tours, legislative activities, safety and health programs, etc.

== The board of directors and board committees ==
The board of directors has no less than 14 members, but the actual number can vary. The board’s directors are elected by the voting delegates of the Arkansas Farm Bureau Federation at their annual meeting. For the purpose of electing directors, the Federation is divided into seven districts made up of each County Farm Bureau. The elected board of directors then nominates persons for the offices of President and Vice President which are then voted on by the voting delegates. The Secretary-Treasurer and Executive Vice President are elected by the Directors from within the group.

Arkansas Farm Bureau has 13 board committees:

- Executive
- Audit
- Compensation
- Investment
- Animal Care
- Environmental Issues
- Food Security
- Health, Safety & Rural Development
- Legislative
- New Products & Services
- Renewable Fuels
- Scholarship
- Trade Advisory
