= Streptomyces davaonensis =

Scientific classification
- Domain: Bacteria
- Kingdom: Bacillati
- Phylum: Actinomycetota
- Class: Actinomycetia
- Order: Streptomycetales
- Family: Streptomycetaceae
- Genus: Streptomyces
- Species: S. davaonensis

Binomial name
- Streptomyces davaonensis (Shinobu 1974) Landwehr et al. 2018

Type strain
- DSM 101723, JCM 4913, KCC S-0913, 768

Species of bacterium

Streptomyces davaonensis is a bacterium species from the genus of Streptomyces.

== See also ==
- List of Streptomyces species
