= 2-amino-5-formylamino-6-ribosylaminopyrimidin-4(3H)-one 5'-monophosphate deformylase =

Class of enzymes

Identifiers
- EC no.: 3.5.1.102

Databases
- BRENDA: enzyme data
- ExPASy: NiceZyme view
- KEGG: enzyme entry
- MetaCyc: metabolic pathway
- Rhea: reactions
- PDB structures: RCSB PDB PDBe PDBsum
Search
- PMC: articles
- PubMed: articles
- NCBI: proteins

2-amino-5-formylamino-6-ribosylaminopyrimidin-4(3H)-one 5'-monophosphate deformylase (EC 3.5.1.102, ArfB) is an enzyme with systematic name 2-amino-5-formylamino-6-(5-phospho-D-ribosylamino)pyrimidin-4(3H)-one amidohydrolase. It catalyses the hydrolysis of 2-amino-5-formylamino-6-(5-phospho-D-ribosylamino)pyrimidin-4(3H)-one to 2,5-diamino-6-hydroxy-4-(5-phosphoribosylamino)pyrimidine and formic acid, which is the second step in riboflavin and 7,8-didemethyl-8-hydroxy-5-deazariboflavin biosynthesis in archaea:

2-Amino-5-formylamino-6-(5-phospho-D-ribosylamino)pyrimidin-4(3H)-one
H_{2}O
HCO_{2}H
2,5-Diamino-6-hydroxy-4-(5-phosphoribosylamino)pyrimidine

The enzyme has been studied as part of the commercial production of riboflavin.
