= 7,8-Dihydroneopterin triphosphate =

Names
- Preferred IUPAC name (2R,3S)-3-(2-Amino-4-oxo-3,4,7,8-tetrahydropteridin-6-yl)-2,3-dihydroxypropyl tetrahydrogen triphosphate
- Other names DHNTP

Identifiers
CAS Number	17088-65-2
3D model (JSmol)	Interactive image; Interactive image
ChEBI	CHEBI:18372
ChemSpider	108735
KEGG	C04895
PubChem CID	121885
UNII	F45GFL976Q
CompTox Dashboard (EPA)	DTXSID60174579
- InChI: InChI=1S/C9H16N5O13P3/c10-9-13-7-5(8(17)14-9)12-3(1-11-7)6(16)4(15)2-25-29(21,22)27-30(23,24)26-28(18,19)20/h4,6,15-16H,1-2H2,(H,21,22)(H,23,24)(H2,18,19,20)(H4,10,11,13,14,17)/t4-,6+/m1/s1 Key: DGGUVLXVLHAAGT-XINAWCOVSA-N; InChI=1/C9H16N5O13P3/c10-9-13-7-5(8(17)14-9)12-3(1-11-7)6(16)4(15)2-25-29(21,22)27-30(23,24)26-28(18,19)20/h4,6,15-16H,1-2H2,(H,21,22)(H,23,24)(H2,18,19,20)(H4,10,11,13,14,17)/t4-,6+/m1/s1 Key: DGGUVLXVLHAAGT-XINAWCOVBB
- SMILES: O=C1C2=C(NCC([C@@H]([C@@H](COP(OP(OP(O)(O)=O)(O)=O)(O)=O)O)O)=N2)NC(N)=N1; O=P(O)(O)OP(=O)(O)OP(=O)(O)OC[C@@H](O)[C@@H](O)C/1=N/C=2C(=O)\N=C(/NC=2NC\1)N

Properties
Chemical formula	C_{9}H_{16}N_{5}O_{13}P_{3}
Molar mass	495.170 g·mol^{−1}
- Except where otherwise noted, data are given for materials in their standard state (at 25 °C [77 °F], 100 kPa). verify (what is ?) Infobox references

7,8-Dihydroneopterin triphosphate (DHNTP) is an intermediate in tetrahydrobiopterin biosynthesis. It is transformed by 6-pyruvoyltetrahydropterin synthase into 6-pyruvoyltetrahydropterin (dyspropterin). It is also used in the queuosine/archeosine pathway.

== Synonyms ==
- Dihydroneopterin triphosphate
- 7,8-Dihydroneopterin 3'-triphosphate
- 6-(L-erythro-1,2-Dihydroxypropyl 3-triphosphate)-7,8-dihydropterin
- 6-[(1S,2R)-1,2-dihydroxy-3-triphosphooxypropyl]-7,8-dihydropterin
- 6-(L-erythro-1,2-Dihydroxy-3-triphosphooxypropyl)-7,8-dihydropterin
- 2-Amino-4-hydroxy-6-(erythro-1,2,3-trihydroxypropyl)dihydropteridine triphosphate
- 2-Amino-4-hydroxy-6-(erythro-1,2,3-trihydroxypropyl)dihydropteridinetriphosphate
- (2R,3S)-3-(2-Amino-4-oxo-3,4,7,8-tetrahydropteridin-6-yl)-2,3-dihydroxypropyl tetrahydrogen triphosphate
