= GTP cyclohydrolase IIa =

Class of enzymes

Identifiers
- EC no.: 3.5.4.29

Databases
- BRENDA: enzyme data
- ExPASy: NiceZyme view
- KEGG: enzyme entry
- MetaCyc: metabolic pathway
- Rhea: reactions
- PDB structures: RCSB PDB PDBe PDBsum
- Gene Ontology: AmiGO / QuickGO
Search
- PMC: articles
- PubMed: articles
- NCBI: proteins

GTP cyclohydrolase IIa (EC 3.5.4.29) is an enzyme that catalyzes the hydrolysis of guanosine triphosphate to 2-amino-5-formylamino-6-(5-phospho-D-ribosylamino)pyrimidin-4(3H)-one (1) and orthophosphate P_{i}:

guanosine triphosphate
3 H_{2}O
2 P_{i}
(1)

The reaction is part of the biosynthetic pathway to riboflavin in bacteria.

This enzyme is a hydrolase, one acting on carbon-nitrogen bonds other than peptide bonds, specifically in cyclic amidines. The systematic name of this enzyme class is GTP 8,9-hydrolase (phosphate-forming).
