= CKS2 =

Protein-coding gene in the species Homo sapiens

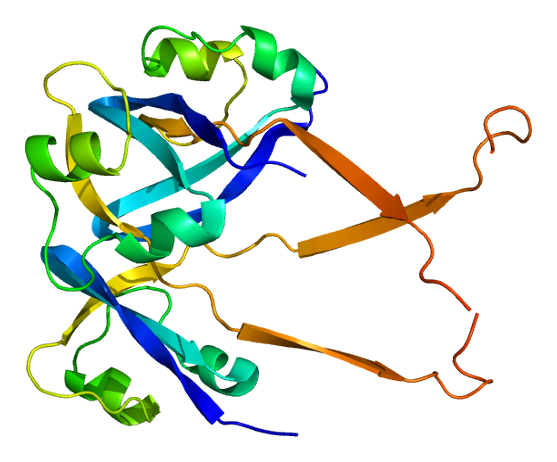
Available structures
PDB	Ortholog search: PDBe RCSB
PDB	List of PDB id codes 1CKS, 4Y72, 5HQ0, 4YC3

Identifiers
- Aliases: CKS2, CKSHS2, CDC28 protein kinase regulatory subunit 2
- External IDs: OMIM: 116901; MGI: 1913447; HomoloGene: 86883; GeneCards: CKS2; OMA:CKS2 - orthologs

Gene location (Human)
Chr.	Chromosome 9 (human)
Band	9q22.2	Start	89,311,195 bp
Band	9q22.2	End	89,316,703 bp

Gene location (Mouse)
Chr.	Chromosome 13 (mouse)
Band	13|13 A5	Start	51,799,268 bp
Band	13|13 A5	End	51,804,696 bp
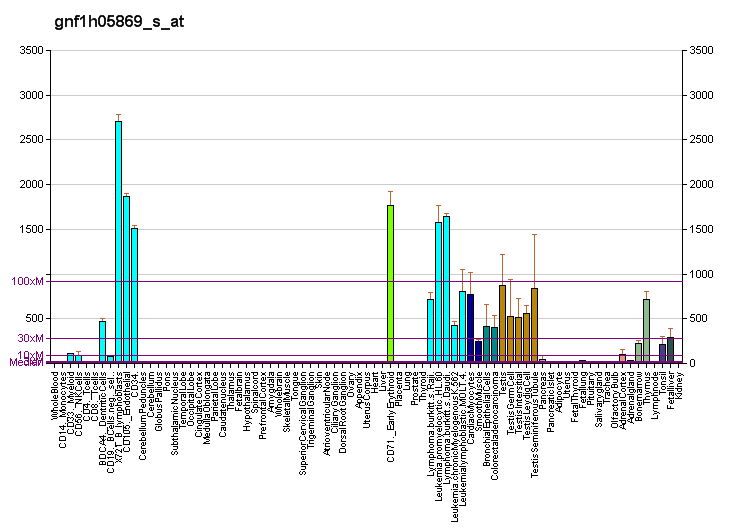

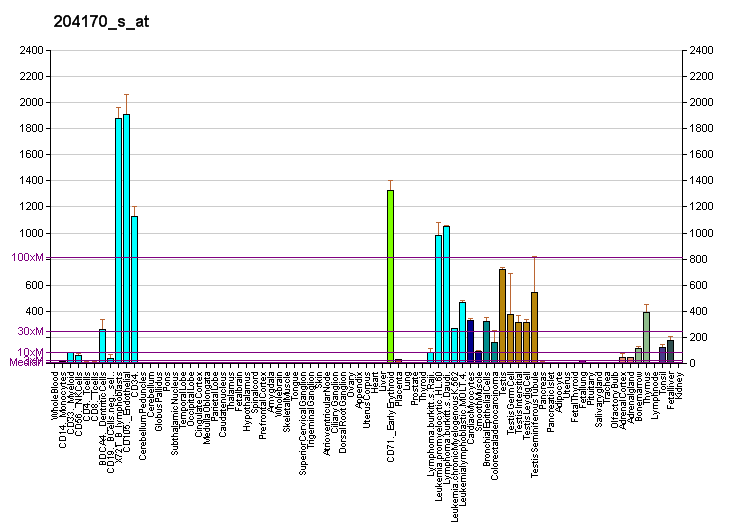
RNA expression pattern
Bgee	Human / Mouse (ortholog); Top expressed in: ventricular zone; right testis; left testis; testicle; ganglionic eminence; sperm; oocyte; trabecular bone; gonad; mucosa of transverse colon / Top expressed in: morula; zygote; secondary oocyte; primary oocyte; embryo; epiblast; ventricular zone; embryo; yolk sac; blastocyst; More reference expression data
BioGPS	More reference expression data
Gene ontology
Molecular function	cyclin-dependent protein serine/threonine kinase regulator activity; chromatin binding; histone binding; protein kinase binding; cyclin-dependent protein serine/threonine kinase activator activity; ubiquitin binding; protein binding
Cellular component	SCF ubiquitin ligase complex; cyclin-dependent protein kinase holoenzyme complex
Biological process	cell cycle; meiosis I; cell division; regulation of mitotic cell cycle; positive regulation of cyclin-dependent protein serine/threonine kinase activity; cell population proliferation; positive regulation of transcription, DNA-templated; mitotic cell cycle phase transition; regulation of transcription by RNA polymerase II; regulation of cyclin-dependent protein serine/threonine kinase activity
Sources:Amigo / QuickGO
Orthologs
Species	Human	Mouse
Entrez	1164	66197
Ensembl	ENSG00000123975	ENSMUSG00000062248
UniProt	P33552	P56390
RefSeq (mRNA)	NM_001827	NM_025415
RefSeq (protein)	NP_001818	NP_079691
Location (UCSC)	Chr 9: 89.31 – 89.32 Mb	Chr 13: 51.8 – 51.8 Mb
PubMed search
- Wikidata
View/Edit Human	View/Edit Mouse

Cyclin-dependent kinases regulatory subunit 2 is a protein that in humans is encoded by the CKS2 gene.

CKS2 protein binds to the catalytic subunit of the cyclin dependent kinases and is essential for their biological function. The CKS2 mRNA is found to be expressed in different patterns through the cell cycle in HeLa cells, which reflects specialized role for the encoded protein.
