= Tyrosine hydroxylase =

Enzyme found in humans

TH
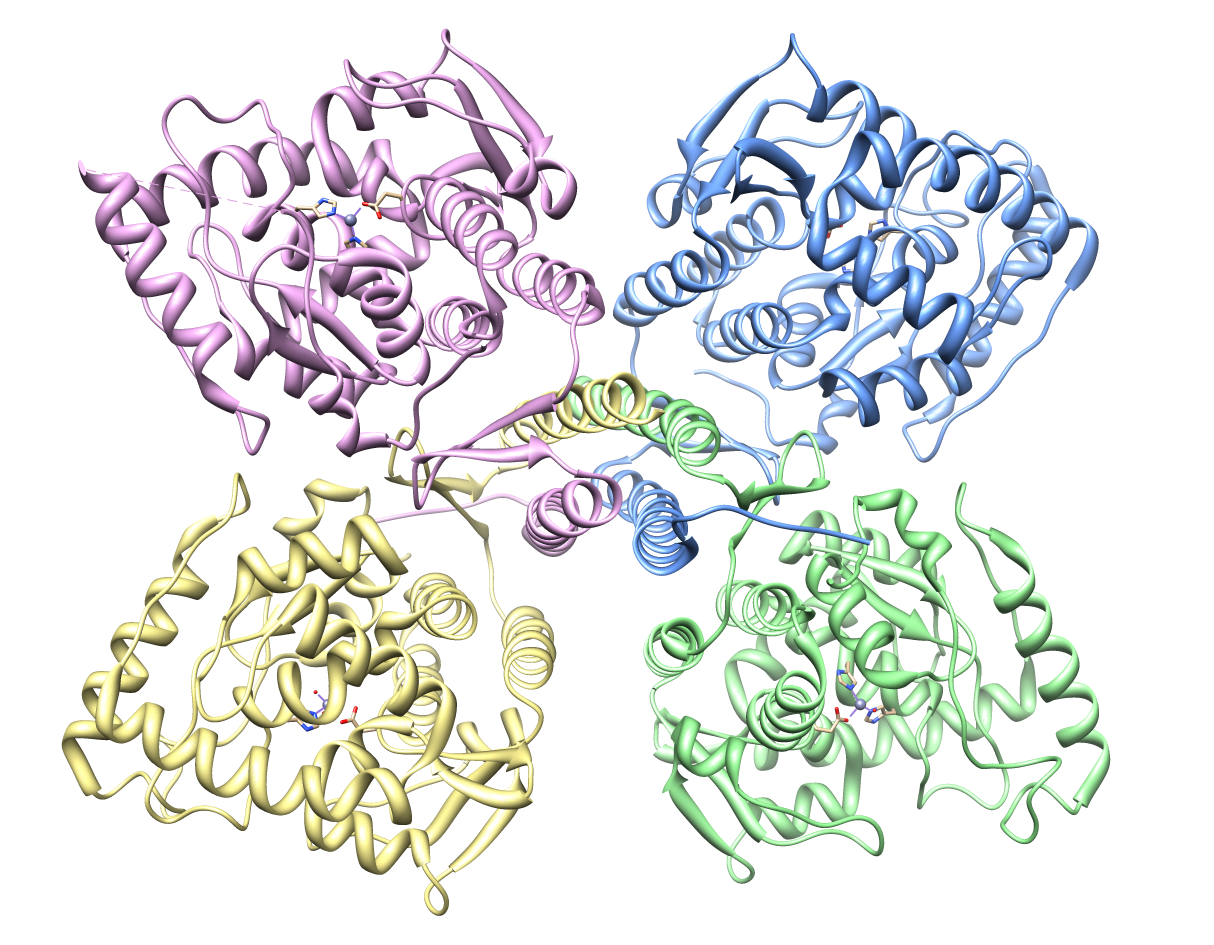

Identifiers
- Aliases: TH, Th, DYT14, DYT5b, TYH, tyrosine hydroxylase, Tyrosine hydroxylase
- External IDs: OMIM: 191290; MGI: 98735; GeneCards: TH
Available structures
PDB	Ortholog search: PDBe RCSB
PDB	List of PDB id codes 2XSN, 4J6S
Enzyme activity
EC #	BRENDA	ExPASy	KEGG	MetaCyc
1.14.16.2	↗	↗	↗	↗

Gene location (Human)
Chr.	Chromosome 11 (human)
Band	11p15.5	Start	2,163,929 bp
Band	11p15.5	End	2,171,815 bp

Gene location (Mouse)
Chr.	Chromosome 7 (mouse)
Band	7 F5|7 88.06 cM	Start	142,446,489 bp
Band	7 F5|7 88.06 cM	End	142,484,865 bp
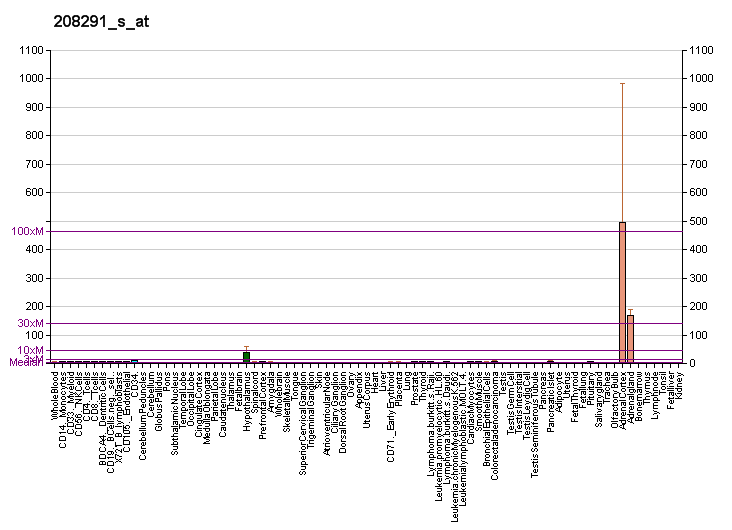
RNA expression pattern
Bgee	Human / Mouse (ortholog); Top expressed in: pars reticulata; pars compacta; testicle; right adrenal gland; hypothalamus; left adrenal gland; left adrenal cortex; gonad; caudate nucleus; right lobe of liver / Top expressed in: superior cervical ganglion; ventral tegmental area; adrenal gland; lumbar spinal ganglion; zygote; secondary oocyte; thoracic ganglia; substantia nigra; external carotid artery; olfactory bulb; More reference expression data
BioGPS	More reference expression data
Gene ontology
Molecular function	tetrahydrobiopterin binding; tyrosine 3-monooxygenase activity; oxidoreductase activity, acting on paired donors, with incorporation or reduction of molecular oxygen, reduced pteridine as one donor, and incorporation of one atom of oxygen; ferrous iron binding; oxygen binding; metal ion binding; dopamine binding; enzyme binding; oxidoreductase activity; iron ion binding; ferric iron binding; protein binding; amino acid binding; monooxygenase activity; protein domain specific binding
Cellular component	cytoplasm; cytosol; mitochondrion; neuron projection; cytoplasmic side of plasma membrane; nucleus; synaptic vesicle; melanosome membrane; terminal bouton; perikaryon; axon; soma; smooth endoplasmic reticulum; dendrite; cytoplasmic vesicle membrane; cytoplasmic vesicle
Biological process	regulation of heart contraction; response to salt stress; response to steroid hormone; response to amphetamine; isoquinoline alkaloid metabolic process; response to zinc ion; terpene metabolic process; learning; epinephrine biosynthetic process; synaptic transmission, dopaminergic; circadian sleep/wake cycle; multicellular organism aging; animal organ morphogenesis; response to growth factor; response to ethanol; cellular response to glucose stimulus; phthalate metabolic process; locomotory behavior; response to light stimulus; anatomical structure morphogenesis; response to nicotine; response to metal ion; memory; development of the heart; response to nutrient levels; embryonic camera-type eye morphogenesis; social behavior; cellular response to manganese ion; response to ether; sphingolipid metabolic process; response to immobilization stress; norepinephrine biosynthetic process; cognition; dopamine biosynthetic process; response to corticosterone; cellular response to nicotine; cellular response to alkaloid; mating behavior; response to electrical stimulus; response to isolation stress; glycoside metabolic process; aromatic amino acid family metabolic process; response to lipopolysaccharide; cerebral cortex development; response to pyrethroid; pigmentation; phytoalexin metabolic process; response to herbicide; visual perception; response to estradiol; response to hypoxia; response to organic cyclic compound; eating behavior; cellular response to growth factor stimulus; heart morphogenesis; response to water deprivation; catecholamine biosynthetic process; neurotransmitter biosynthetic process; response to peptide hormone; hearing; response to activity; fatty acid metabolic process; eye photoreceptor cell development; response to insecticide; dopamine biosynthetic process from tyrosine; aminergic neurotransmitter loading into synaptic vesicle
Sources:Amigo / QuickGO
Orthologs
Databases	NCBI: entry; OMA: entry
Species	Human	Mouse
Entrez	7054	21823
Ensembl	ENSG00000180176	ENSMUSG00000000214
UniProt	P07101; P78428	P24529
RefSeq (mRNA)	NM_000360; NM_199292; NM_199293	NM_009377
RefSeq (protein)	NP_000351; NP_954986; NP_954987; NP_954986.2; NP_954987.2	NP_033403
Location (UCSC)	Chr 11: 2.16 – 2.17 Mb	Chr 7: 142.45 – 142.48 Mb
PubMed search
- Wikidata
View/Edit Human	View/Edit Mouse

Tyrosine hydroxylase or tyrosine 3-monooxygenase is an enzyme that in humans is encoded by the TH gene. It is responsible for catalyzing the conversion of the amino acid L-tyrosine to L-3,4-dihydroxyphenylalanine (L-DOPA). It does so using molecular oxygen (O_{2}), as well as iron (Fe^{2+}) and tetrahydrobiopterin as cofactors. L-DOPA is a precursor for dopamine, which, in turn, is a precursor for the important neurotransmitters norepinephrine (noradrenaline) and epinephrine (adrenaline). Tyrosine hydroxylase catalyzes the rate limiting step in this synthesis of catecholamines. In humans, tyrosine hydroxylase is encoded by the TH gene, and the enzyme is present in the central nervous system (CNS), peripheral sympathetic neurons and the adrenal medulla. Tyrosine hydroxylase, phenylalanine hydroxylase and tryptophan hydroxylase together make up the family of aromatic amino acid hydroxylases (AAAHs).ƒ

== Reaction ==
tyrosine 3-monooxygenase
- Tyrosine hydroxylase catalyzes conversion of tyrosine to L-DOPA using Fe^{2+}, O_{2} and BH_{4}

Identifiers
- EC no.: 1.14.16.2
- CAS no.: 9036-22-0

Databases
- BRENDA: enzyme data
- ExPASy: NiceZyme view
- KEGG: enzyme entry
- MetaCyc: metabolic pathway
- Rhea: reactions
- PDB structures: RCSB PDB PDBe PDBsum
- Gene Ontology: AmiGO / QuickGO
Search
- PMC: articles
- PubMed: articles
- NCBI: proteins

Tyrosine hydroxylase catalyzes the reaction in which L-tyrosine is hydroxylated in the meta position to obtain L-3,4-dihydroxyphenylalanine (L-DOPA). The enzyme is an oxygenase which means it uses molecular oxygen to hydroxylate its substrates. One of the oxygen atoms in O_{2} is used to hydroxylate the tyrosine molecule to obtain L-DOPA and the other one is used to hydroxylate the cofactor. Like the other aromatic amino acid hydroxylases (AAAHs), tyrosine hydroxylase use the cofactor tetrahydrobiopterin (BH_{4}) under normal conditions, although other similar molecules may also work as a cofactor for tyrosine hydroxylase.

The AAAHs converts the cofactor 5,6,7,8-tetrahydrobiopterin (BH_{4}) into tetrahydrobiopterin-4a-carbinolamine (4a-BH_{4}). Under physiological conditions, 4a-BH_{4} is dehydrated to quinonoid-dihydrobiopterin (q-BH_{2}) by the enzyme pterin-4a-carbinolamine dehydrase (PCD) and a water molecule is released in this reaction. Then, the NAD(P)H dependent enzyme dihydropteridine reductase (DHPR) converts q-BH_{2} back to BH_{4}. Each of the four subunits in tyrosine hydroxylase is coordinated with an iron(II) atom presented in the active site. The oxidation state of this iron atom is important for the catalytic turnover in the enzymatic reaction. If the iron is oxidized to Fe(III), the enzyme is inactivated.

The product of the enzymatic reaction, L-DOPA, can be transformed to dopamine by the enzyme DOPA decarboxylase. Dopamine may be converted into norepinephrine by the enzyme dopamine β-hydroxylase, which can be further modified by the enzyme phenylethanol N-methyltransferase to obtain epinephrine. Since L-DOPA is the precursor for the neurotransmitters dopamine, noradrenaline and adrenaline, tyrosine hydroxylase is therefore found in the cytosol of all cells containing these catecholamines. This initial reaction catalyzed by tyrosine hydroxylase has been shown to be the rate limiting step in the production of catecholamines.

The enzyme is highly specific, not accepting indole derivatives - which is unusual as many other enzymes involved in the production of catecholamines do. Tryptophan is a poor substrate for tyrosine hydroxylase, however it can hydroxylate L-phenylalanine to form L-tyrosine and small amounts of 3-hydroxyphenylalanine. The enzyme can then further catalyze L-tyrosine to form L-DOPA. Tyrosine hydroxylase may also be involved in other reactions as well, such as oxidizing L-DOPA to form 5-S-cysteinyl-DOPA or other L-DOPA derivatives.

== Structure ==
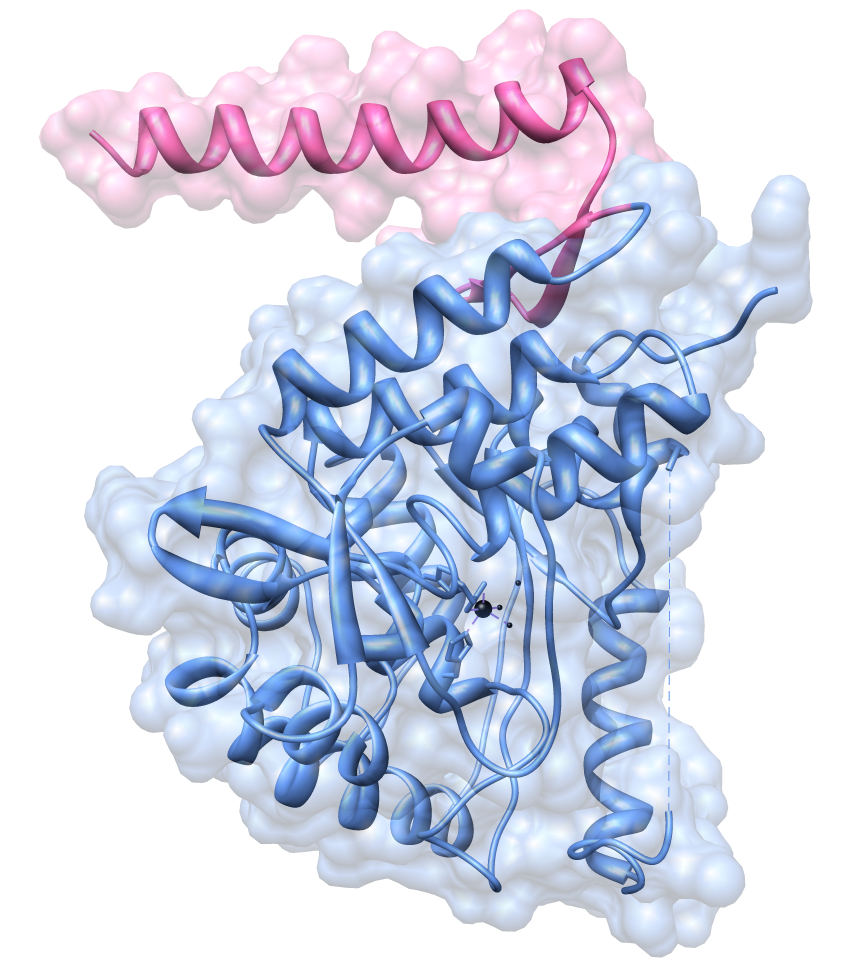
Tyrosine hydroxylase from rat showing two of its domains, the tetramerization domain (pink) and the catalytic domain (blue). The regulatory domain (not shown) would sit somewhere on the right hand side of the image where also the enzyme's substrate would enter from.

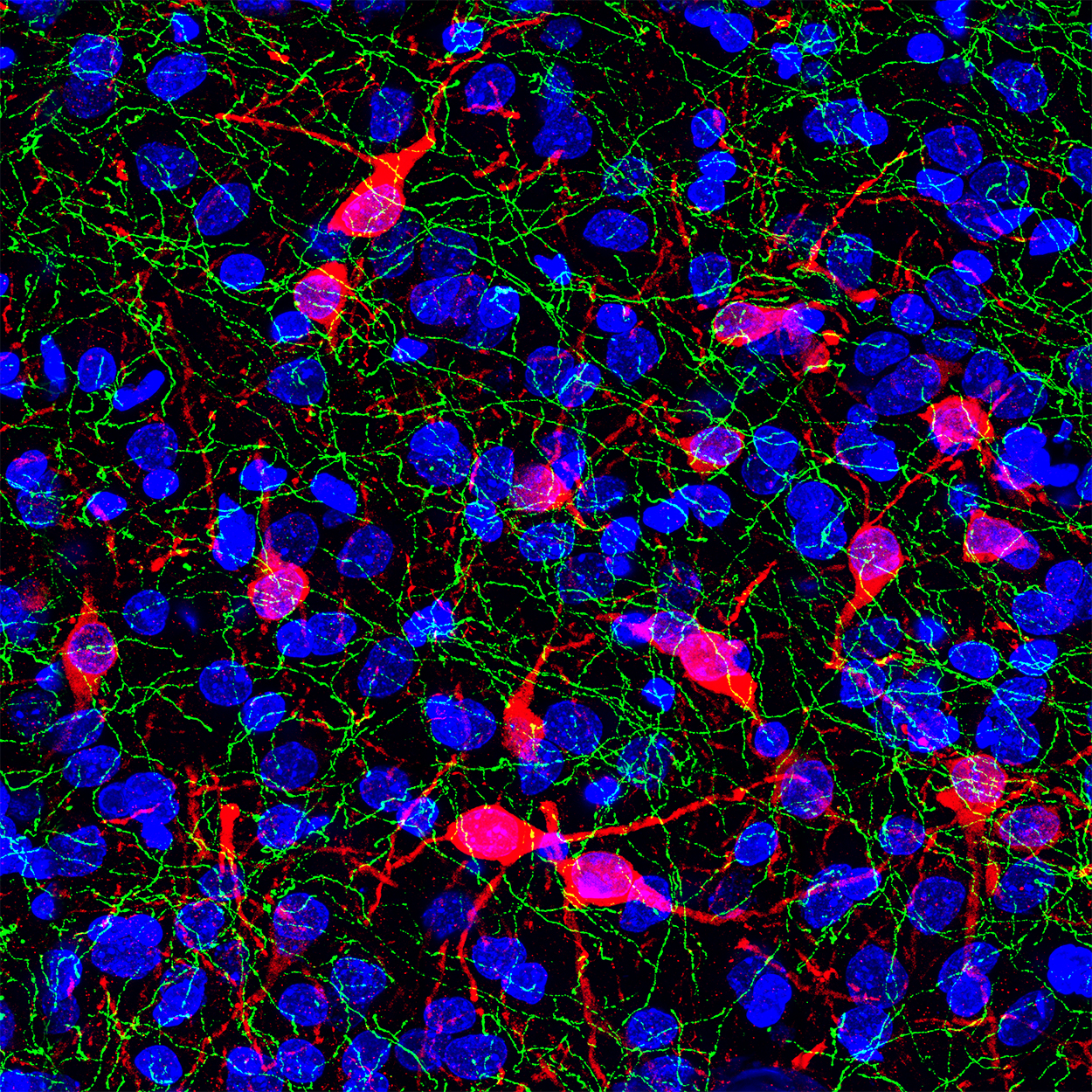
Tyrosine hydroxylase in red and serotonin transporter (Slc6a4) in green and nuclear DNA in blue in a region of rat brain stem. Antibody staining and imaging by EnCor Biotechnology Inc.

Tyrosine hydroxylase is a tetramer of four identical subunits (homotetramer). Each subunit consists of three domains. At the carboxyl terminal of the peptide chain there's a short alpha helix domain that allows tetramerization. The central ~300 amino acids make up a catalytic core, in which all the residues necessary for catalysis are located, along with a non-covalently bound iron atom. The iron is held in place by two histidine residues and one glutamate residue, making it a non-heme, non-iron-sulfur iron-containing enzyme. The amino terminal ~150 amino acids make up a regulatory domain, thought to control access of substrates to the active site. In humans there are thought to be four different versions of this regulatory domain, and thus four versions of the enzyme, depending on alternative splicing, though none of their structures have yet been properly determined. It has been suggested that this domain might be an intrinsically unstructured protein, which has no clearly defined tertiary structure, but so far no evidence has been presented supporting this claim. It has however been shown that the domain has a low occurrence of secondary structures, which doesn't weaken suspicions of it having a disordered overall structure. As for the tetramerization and catalytic domains their structure was found with rat tyrosine hydroxylase using X-ray crystallography. This has shown how its structure is very similar to that of phenylalanine hydroxylase and tryptophan hydroxylase; together the three make up a family of homologous aromatic amino acid hydroxylases.

== Regulation ==
Tyrosine hydroxylase catalyzes the rate limiting step in catecholamine biosynthesis

Activation of the TH gene requires cyclic adenosine monophosphate (cAMP) to cause a conformation change upon binding to protein kinase A (PKA). PKA can phosphorylate both the TH gene for transcription and the tyrosine hydroxylase protein to increase its efficiency. This activation is altered by upstream cis-acting motifs – AP1, AP2, and cAMP response element. The cAMP response element, 38-45 base pairs upstream, plays a bigger role in gene regulation than the others.

Tyrosine hydroxylase activity is increased in the short term by phosphorylation. The regulatory domain of tyrosine hydroxylase contains multiple serine (Ser) residues, including Ser8, Ser19, Ser31 and Ser40, that are phosphorylated by a variety of protein kinases. Ser40 is phosphorylated by the cAMP-dependent protein kinase. Ser19 (and Ser40 to a lesser extent) is phosphorylated by the calcium-calmodulin-dependent protein kinase. MAPKAPK2 (mitogen-activated-protein kinase-activating protein kinase) has a preference for Ser40, but also phosphorylates Ser19 about half the rate of Ser40. Ser31 is phosphorylated by ERK1 and ERK2 (extracellular regulated kinases 1&2), and increases the enzyme activity to a lesser extent than for Ser40 phosphorylation. The phosphorylation at Ser19 and Ser8 has no direct effect on tyrosine hydroxylase activity. But phosphorylation at Ser19 increases the rate of phosphorylation at Ser40, leading to an increase in enzyme activity. Phosphorylation at Ser19 causes a two-fold increase of activity, through a mechanism that requires the 14-3-3 proteins. Phosphorylation at Ser31 causes a slight increase of activity, and here the mechanism is unknown. Tyrosine hydroxylase is somewhat stabilized to heat inactivation when the regulatory serines are phosphorylated.

Tyrosine hydroxylase is mainly present in the cytosol, although it also is found in some extent in the plasma membrane. The membrane association may be related to catecholamine packing in vesicles and export through the synaptic membrane. The binding of tyrosine hydroxylase to membranes involves the N-terminal region of the enzyme, and may be regulated by a three-way interaction between 14-3-3 proteins, the N-terminal region of tyrosine hydroxylase, and negatively charged membranes.

Tyrosine hydroxylase can also be regulated by inhibition. Phosphorylation at Ser40 relieves feedback inhibition by the catecholamines dopamine, epinephrine, and norepinephrine. The catecholamines trap the active-site iron in the Fe(III) state, inhibiting the enzyme.

It has been shown that the expression of tyrosine hydroxylase can be affected by the expression of SRY. The down regulation of the SRY gene in the substantia nigra can result in a decrease in tyrosine hydroxylase expression.

Long term regulation of tyrosine hydroxylase can also be mediated by phosphorylation mechanisms. Hormones (e.g. glucocorticoids), drugs (e.g. cocaine), or second messengers such as cAMP increase tyrosine hydroxylase transcription. Increase in tyrosine hydroxylase activity due to phosphorylation can be sustained by nicotine for up to 48 hours. Tyrosine hydroxylase activity is regulated chronically (days) by protein synthesis.

== Clinical significance ==
Mutations in the TH gene may cause tyrosine hydroxylase deficiency (THD), a rare neurometabolic disorder inherited in an autosomal recessive manner. Tyrosine hydroxylase deficiency leads to impaired synthesis of dopamine as well as epinephrine and norepinephrine. It is represented by a progressive encephalopathy and poor prognosis. Clinical features include dystonia that is minimally or nonresponsive to levodopa, extrapyramidal symptoms, ptosis, miosis, and postural hypotension. This is a progressive and often lethal disorder, which can be improved but not cured by levodopa. Due to the low number of patients and overlapping symptoms with other disorders, early diagnosis and treatment remain challenging. Response to treatment is variable and the long-term and functional outcome is unknown. To provide a basis for improving the understanding of the epidemiology, genotype/phenotype correlation and outcome of these diseases, their impact on the quality of life of patients, and for evaluating diagnostic and therapeutic strategies, a patient registry was established by the noncommercial International Working Group on Neurotransmitter Related Disorders (iNTD).

Furthermore, alterations in the tyrosine hydroxylase enzyme activity may be involved in disorders such as Segawa's dystonia, Parkinson's disease and schizophrenia. Tyrosine hydroxylase is activated by phosphorylation dependent binding to 14-3-3 proteins. Since the 14-3-3 proteins also are likely to be associated with neurodegenerative diseases such as Alzheimer's disease, Parkinson's disease and Huntington's disease, it makes an indirect link between tyrosine hydroxylase and these diseases. The activity of tyrosine hydroxylase in the brains of patients with Alzheimer's disease has been shown to be significantly reduced compared to healthy individuals. Tyrosine hydroxylase is also an autoantigen in autoimmune polyendocrine syndrome (APS) type I.

A consistent abnormality in Parkinson's disease is degeneration of dopaminergic neurons in the substantia nigra, leading to a reduction of striatal dopamine levels. As tyrosine hydroxylase catalyzes the formation of L-DOPA, the rate-limiting step in the biosynthesis of dopamine, tyrosine hydroxylase-deficiency does not cause Parkinson's disease, but typically gives rise to infantile parkinsonism, although the spectrum extends to a condition resembling dopamine-responsive dystonia. A direct pathogenetic role of tyrosine hydroxylase has also been suggested, as the enzyme is a source of H_{2}O_{2} and other reactive oxygen species (ROS), and a target for radical-mediated injury. It has been demonstrated that L-DOPA is effectively oxidized by mammalian tyrosine hydroxylase, possibly contributing to the cytotoxic effects of L-DOPA. Like other cellular proteins, tyrosine hydroxylase is also a possible target for damaging alterations induced by ROS. This suggests that some of the oxidative damage to tyrosine hydroxylase could be generated by the tyrosine hydroxylase system itself.

Tyrosine hydroxylase can be inhibited by the drug α-methyl-para-tyrosine (metirosine). This inhibition can lead to a depletion of dopamine and norepinepherine in the brain due to the lack of the precursor L-DOPA (L-3,4-dyhydroxyphenylalanine) which is synthesized by tyrosine hydroxylase. This drug is rarely used and can cause depression, but it is useful in treating pheochromocytoma and also resistant hypertension. Older examples of inhibitors mentioned in the literature include oudenone and aquayamycin.
