= GTP cyclohydrolase II =

Class of enzymes

Identifiers
- EC no.: 3.5.4.25
- CAS no.: 56214-35-8

Databases
- BRENDA: enzyme data
- ExPASy: NiceZyme view
- KEGG: enzyme entry
- MetaCyc: metabolic pathway
- Rhea: reactions
- PDB structures: RCSB PDB PDBe PDBsum
- Gene Ontology: AmiGO / QuickGO
Search
- PMC: articles
- PubMed: articles
- NCBI: proteins

GTP cyclohydrolase II (EC 3.5.4.25) is an enzyme characterised from Escherichia coli that catalyzes the hydrolysis of guanosine triphosphate to give 2,5-diamino-6-hydroxy-4-(5-phosphoribosylamino)pyrimidine (1), formic acid, and orthophosphoric acid (P_{i}):

guanosine triphosphate
4 H_{2}O
HCO_{2}H
(1)
+ 2 P_{i}

This enzyme is a hydrolase, one acting on carbon-nitrogen bonds other than peptide bonds, specifically in cyclic amidines. The systematic name of this enzyme class is GTP 7,8-8,9-dihydrolase (diphosphate-forming). Other names in use include guanosine triphosphate cyclohydrolase II, and GTP-8-formylhydrolase. The reaction is part of riboflavin biosynthesis.

== Structural studies ==
As of late 2007, two structures have been solved for this class of enzymes, with PDB accession codes PDB: 2BZ0 and PDB: 2BZ1.
