= International Working Group on Neurotransmitter Related Disorders =

The International Working Group on Neurotransmitter Related Disorders is an international collaboration of researchers studying neurotransmitter disorders. It has created a patient registry for longitudinal studies.

The group studies deficiencies in aromatic amino acid decarboxylase, tyrosine hydroxylase, dopamine beta-hydroxylase, monoamine oxidase A, dopamine transporter, vesicular monoamine transporter 2 GTP cyclohydrolase (Segawa disease), 6-pyruvoyl-tetrahydropterin synthase, dihydropteridine reductase, sepiapterin reductase, folate receptor alpha, dihydrofolate reductase, 3-phosphoglycerate dehydrogenase, 3-phosphoserine phosphatase, phosphoserine aminotransferase, the glycine cleavage system (the deficiency is called glycine encephalopathy or non-ketotic hyperglycinaemia), GABA-transaminase, and succinate-semialdehyde dehydroxylase.
