= Neu–Laxova syndrome =

- Other names: Neu-Povysilová syndrome; Neu syndrome; 3-phosphoglycerate dehydrogenase deficiency, neonate form
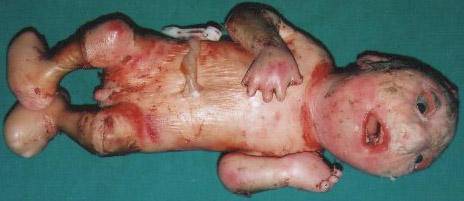
- Neu–Laxova syndrome
- Specialty: Medical genetics

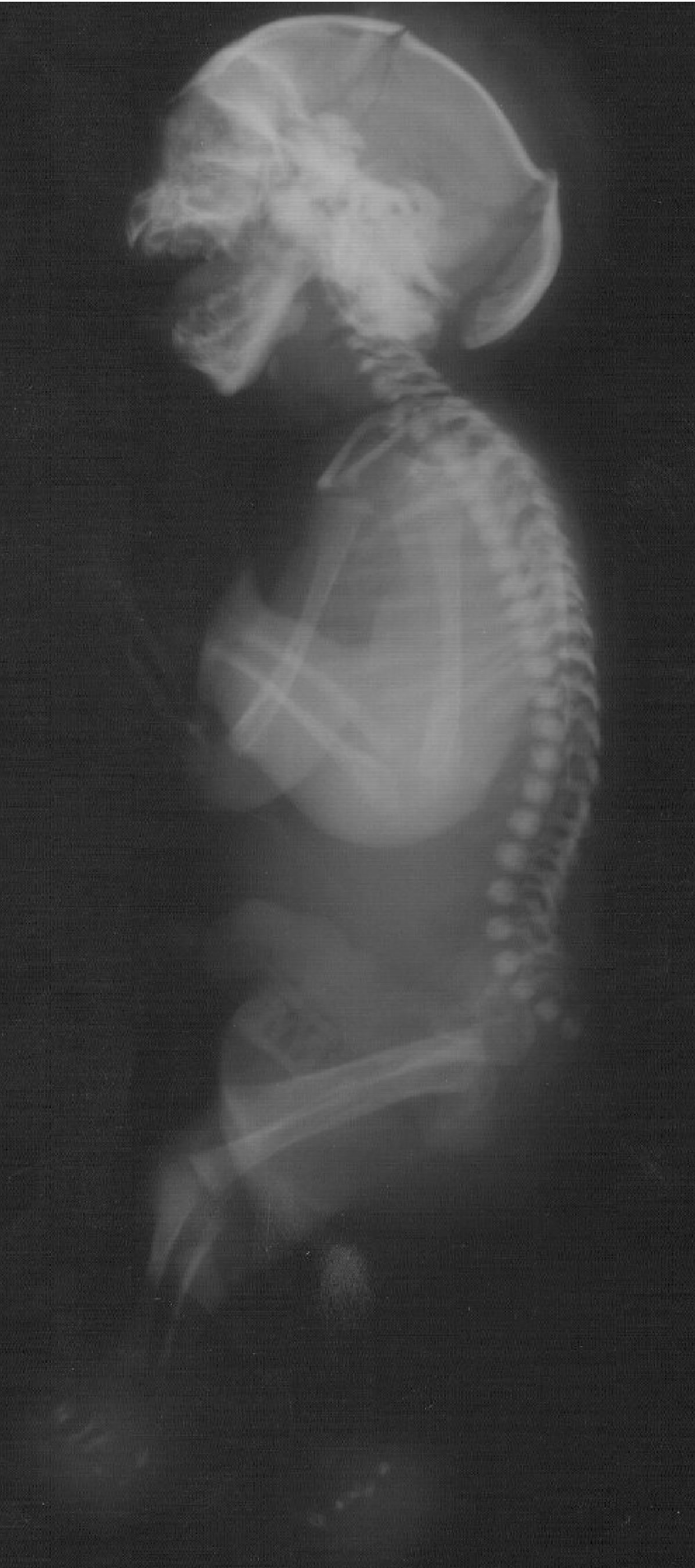
Babygram of newborn who survived for 5 minutes after delivery with Neu-Laxova syndrome (same case)

Neu–Laxova syndrome (NLS, also known as Neu syndrome; Neu-Povýsilová syndrome; or 3-phosphoglycerate dehydrogenase deficiency, neonate form) is a rare autosomal recessive disorder characterized by severe intrauterine growth restriction and multiple congenital malformations. Neu–Laxova syndrome is a very severe disorder, leading to stillbirth or death shortly after birth. It was first described by Dr. Richard Neu in 1971 and Dr. Renata Laxova in 1972 as a lethal disorder in siblings with multiple malformations. Neu–Laxova syndrome is an extremely rare disorder with fewer than 100 cases reported in medical literature.

== Signs and symptoms ==
Neu-Laxova syndrome presents with severe malformations leading to prenatal or neonatal death. Typically, NLS involves characteristic facial features, decreased fetal movements and skin abnormalities. Fetuses or newborns with Neu–Laxova syndrome have typical facial characteristics which include proptosis (bulging eyes) with eyelid malformations, nose malformations, round and gaping mouth, micrognathia (small jaw) and low set or malformed ears. Additional facial malformations may be present, such as cleft lip or cleft palate. Limb malformations are common and involve the fingers (syndactyly), hands, or feet. Additionally, edema and flexion deformities are often present. Other features of NLS are severe intrauterine growth restriction, skin abnormalities (ichthyosis and hyperkeratosis) and decreased movement. Malformations in the central nervous system are frequent and may include microcephaly, lissencephaly or microgyria, hypoplasia of the cerebellum and agenesis of the corpus callosum. Other malformations may also be present, such as neural tube defects.

== Genetics ==
Neu-Laxova syndrome is a heterogeneous metabolic disorder caused by homozygous or compound heterozygous mutations in one of three genes: PHGDH, PSAT1 and PSPH These genes are involved in the serine biosynthesis pathway and are essential for cell proliferation. Mutations in all three genes had been previously identified as the cause of serine-deficiency syndromes. Although there is some clinical overlap between NLS and these neurometabolic disorders, the phenotype in other serine-deficiency disorders is milder.

== Diagnosis ==
The diagnosis is usually based on clinical features present at birth. Ultrasound in the second trimester may show abnormalities associated with NLS, including polyhydramnios, intrauterine growth restriction, microcephaly, proptosis and decreased fetal motility.

== Treatment ==
Serine and glycine supplementation has shown tentative benefits in those with related serine biosynthesis defects and milder forms of NLS.

== Prognosis ==
The prognosis is poor; affected individuals are either stillborn or die shortly after birth. The longest survival reported in the literature is 134 days. This syndrome is transmitted as an autosomal recessive disorder and there is a risk for recurrence of 25% in future pregnancies.
