= Calcineurin-like phosphoesterase =

Family of enzymes

Metallophos
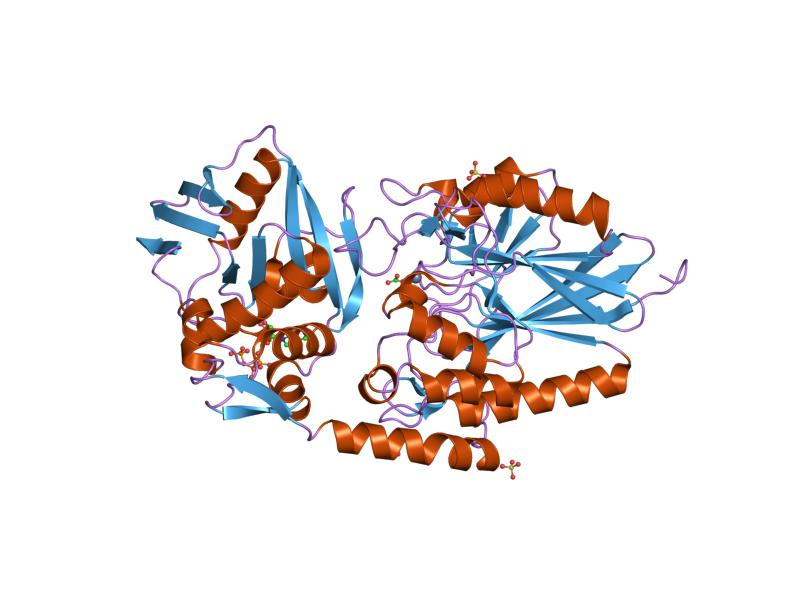
- 5'-nucleotidase (open form) complex with atp

Identifiers
- Symbol: Metallophos
- Pfam: PF00149
- Pfam clan: CL0163
- InterPro: IPR004843
- SCOP2: 1fjm / SCOPe / SUPFAM
- OPM superfamily: 389
- OPM protein: 3tgh
- CDD: cd00838
- Membranome: 585
Available protein structures:
- PDB: IPR004843 PF00149 (ECOD; PDBsum)
- AlphaFold: IPR004843; PF00149

The calcineurin-like phosphoesterases are a family of enzymes related to calcineurin. It includes a diverse range of phosphoesterases, including protein phosphoserine phosphatases, nucleotidases, sphingomyelin phosphodiesterases and 2'-3' cAMP phosphodiesterases as well as some bacterial nucleases. The most conserved region is a centre on the metal chelating residues.
