= Phosphoserine transaminase =

IUPAC Nomenclature of a catalyst enzyme

Identifiers
- EC no.: 2.6.1.52
- CAS no.: 9030-90-4

Databases
- IntEnz: IntEnz view
- BRENDA: BRENDA entry
- ExPASy: NiceZyme view
- KEGG: KEGG entry
- MetaCyc: metabolic pathway
- PRIAM: profile
- PDB structures: RCSB PDB PDBe PDBsum
Search
- PMC: articles
- PubMed: articles
- NCBI: proteins

Phosphoserine transaminase (EC 2.6.1.52, PSAT, phosphoserine aminotransferase, 3-phosphoserine aminotransferase, hydroxypyruvic phosphate-glutamic transaminase, L-phosphoserine aminotransferase, phosphohydroxypyruvate transaminase, phosphohydroxypyruvic-glutamic transaminase, 3-O-phospho-L-serine:2-oxoglutarate aminotransferase, SerC, PdxC, 3PHP transaminase) is an enzyme with systematic name O-phospho-L-serine:2-oxoglutarate aminotransferase. This enzyme catalyses two reversible chemical reactions. In the first, phosphoserine is converted to phosphohydroxypyruvic acid by transfer of an amino group to α-ketoglutaric acid, giving L-glutamic acid:

phosphoserine
+
α-ketoglutaric acid
phosphohydroxypyruvic acid
+
L-glutamic acid

This reaction normally proceeds in the direction of formation of phosphoserine, and is part of the pathway to the amino acid, serine, as found in Escherichia coli and sheep. As with many aminotransferases, the enzyme uses pyridoxal phosphate as a cofactor.

Alternatively, 4-(phosphonooxy)-L-threonine is converted to (R)-3-hydroxy-2-oxo-4-phosphonooxybutanoic acid with the same α-ketoglutaric acid / L-glutamic acid exchange:

Pyridoxal 5'-phosphate

4-(phosphonooxy)-L-threonine
+ α-ketoglutaric
acid
(R)-3-hydroxy-2-oxo-4-phosphonooxybutanoic acid
+ L-glutamic
acid

This reaction, when used to give 4-(phosphonooxy)-L-threonine, is part of the biosynthesis of vitamin B_{6}, (pyridoxal 5'-phosphate), and thus the enzyme in E. coli is involved in making its own cofactor.

== See also ==
- PSAT1
