= PSAT1 =

Protein-coding gene in the species Homo sapiens

Identifiers
- Aliases: PSAT1, EPIP, PSA, PSAT, NLS2, PSATD, phosphoserine aminotransferase 1
- External IDs: OMIM: 610936; MGI: 2183441; GeneCards: PSAT1
Available structures
PDB	Ortholog search: PDBe RCSB
PDB	List of PDB id codes 3E77
Enzyme activity
EC #	BRENDA	ExPASy	KEGG	MetaCyc
2.6.1.52	↗	↗	↗	↗

Gene location (Human)
Chr.	Chromosome 9 (human)
Band	9q21.2	Start	78,297,125 bp
Band	9q21.2	End	78,330,093 bp

Gene location (Mouse)
Chr.	Chromosome 19 (mouse)
Band	19 A|19 10.86 cM	Start	15,882,042 bp
Band	19 A|19 10.86 cM	End	15,924,701 bp
RNA expression pattern
Bgee	Human / Mouse (ortholog); Top expressed in: ventricular zone; inferior ganglion of vagus nerve; corpus epididymis; subthalamic nucleus; external globus pallidus; superior vestibular nucleus; ganglionic eminence; amygdala; ventral tegmental area; caudate nucleus / Top expressed in: vestibular sensory epithelium; utricle; condyle; endothelial cell of lymphatic vessel; seminal vesicula; ventricular zone; substantia nigra; tail of embryo; primitive streak; fossa; More reference expression data
BioGPS	n/a
Gene ontology
Molecular function	transferase activity; O-phospho-L-serine:2-oxoglutarate aminotransferase activity; catalytic activity; transaminase activity
Cellular component	extracellular exosome; cytoplasm; cytosol
Biological process	pyridoxine biosynthetic process; cellular amino acid biosynthetic process; L-serine biosynthetic process
Sources:Amigo / QuickGO
Orthologs
Databases	NCBI: entry; OMA: entry
Species	Human	Mouse
Entrez	29968	107272
Ensembl	ENSG00000135069	ENSMUSG00000024640
UniProt	Q9Y617	Q99K85
RefSeq (mRNA)	NM_058179; NM_021154	NM_001205339; NM_177420
RefSeq (protein)	NP_066977; NP_478059	NP_001192268; NP_803155
Location (UCSC)	Chr 9: 78.3 – 78.33 Mb	Chr 19: 15.88 – 15.92 Mb
PubMed search
- Wikidata
View/Edit Human	View/Edit Mouse

Phosphoserine aminotransferase (PSA) also known as phosphohydroxythreonine aminotransferase (PSAT) is an enzyme that in humans is encoded by the PSAT1 gene.

The protein encoded by this gene is likely a phosphoserine aminotransferase, based on similarity to proteins in mouse, rabbit, and Drosophila. Alternative splicing of this gene results in two transcript variants encoding different isoforms.

== Clinical significance ==
Homozygous or compound heterozygous mutations in PSAT1 cause Neu–Laxova syndrome and phosphoserine aminotransferase deficiency.

== See also ==
- Phosphoserine transaminase
