= D-glycerate dehydrogenase deficiency =

Rare autosomal recessive human diseases

- Other names: 3-phosphoglycerate dehydrogenase deficiency, PHGDH deficiency, PHGDHD
- Condition is acquired via an autosomal recessive pattern
- Specialty: Metabolism
- Symptoms: Congenital microcephaly, psychomotor retardation and seizures in infants, moderate developmental delay and behavioral disorders juveniles.
- Usual onset: Adolescent, Infancy, Childhood
- Causes: Genetic
- Prevention: N/A
- Treatment: Diet
- Medication: Serine
- Prognosis: Shortened life expectancy
- Frequency: <1 / 1 000 000

D-glycerate dehydrogenase deficiency (or 3-phosphoglycerate dehydrogenase deficiency, PHGDH deficiency, PHGDHD) is a rare autosomal metabolic disease where the young patient is unable to produce an enzyme necessary to convert 3-phosphoglycerate into 3-phosphohydroxypyruvate, which is the only way for humans to synthesize serine. This disorder is called Neu–Laxova syndrome in neonates.

== Cause ==
Homozygous or compound heterozygous mutations in 3-phosphoglycerate dehydrogenase (PHGDH) cause Neu-Laxova syndrome and phosphoglycerate dehydrogenase deficiency.

== Mechanism ==
3-Phosphoglycerate dehydrogenase catalyzes the transition of 3-phosphoglycerate into 3-phosphohydroxypyruvate, which is the committed step in the phosphorylated pathway of L-serine biosynthesis. It is also essential in cysteine and glycine synthesis, which lie further downstream. This pathway represents the only way to synthesize serine in most organisms except plants, which uniquely possess multiple synthetic pathways. Nonetheless, the phosphorylated pathway that PHGDH participates in is still suspected to have an essential role in serine synthesis used in the developmental signaling of plants.

== Treatment ==
Treatment typically involves oral supplementation of serine and glycine.
