= PSPH =

Enzyme found in humans

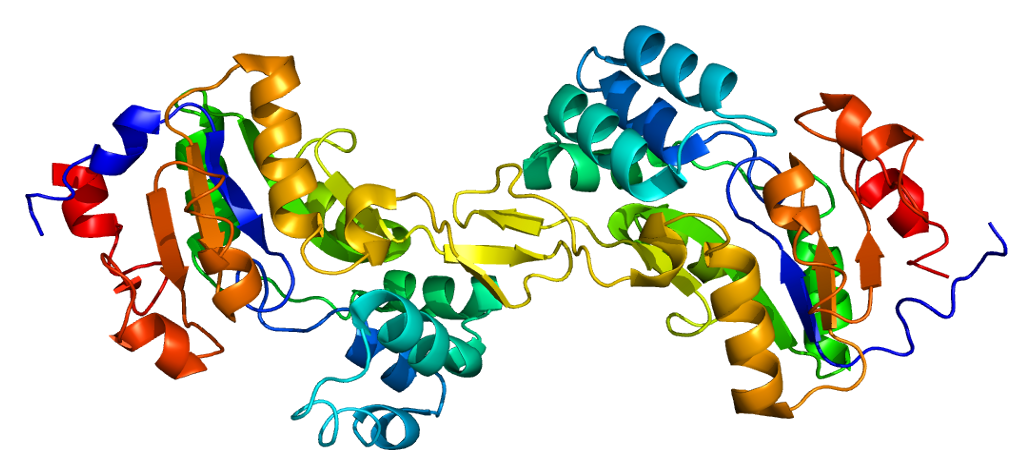

Identifiers
- Aliases: PSPH, PSP, PSPHD, phosphoserine phosphatase
- External IDs: OMIM: 172480; MGI: 97788; GeneCards: PSPH
Available structures
PDB	Ortholog search: PDBe RCSB
PDB	List of PDB id codes 1L8L, 1L8O, 1NNL
Enzyme activity
EC #	BRENDA	ExPASy	KEGG	MetaCyc
3.1.3.3	↗	↗	↗	↗

Gene location (Human)
Chr.	Chromosome 7 (human)
Band	7p11.2	Start	56,011,051 bp
Band	7p11.2	End	56,051,604 bp

Gene location (Mouse)
Chr.	Chromosome 5 (mouse)
Band	5|5 G1.3	Start	129,842,622 bp
Band	5|5 G1.3	End	129,864,513 bp
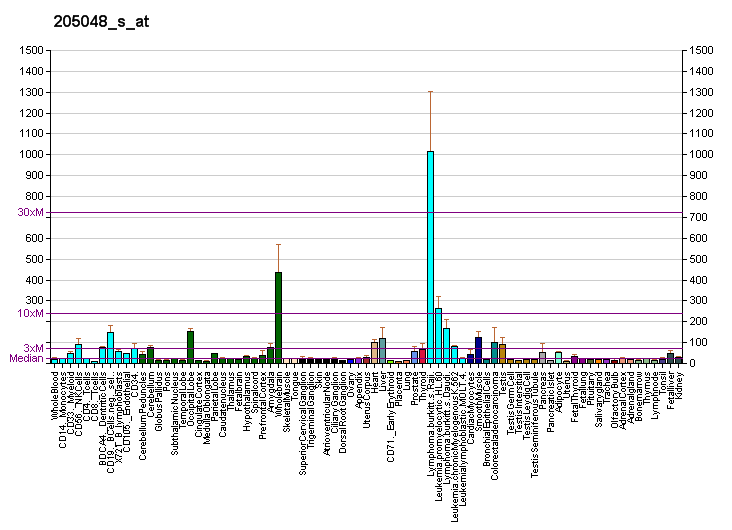

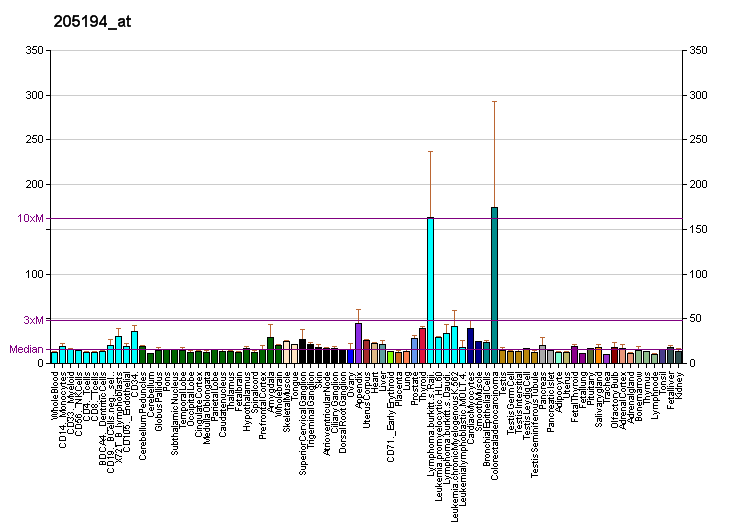

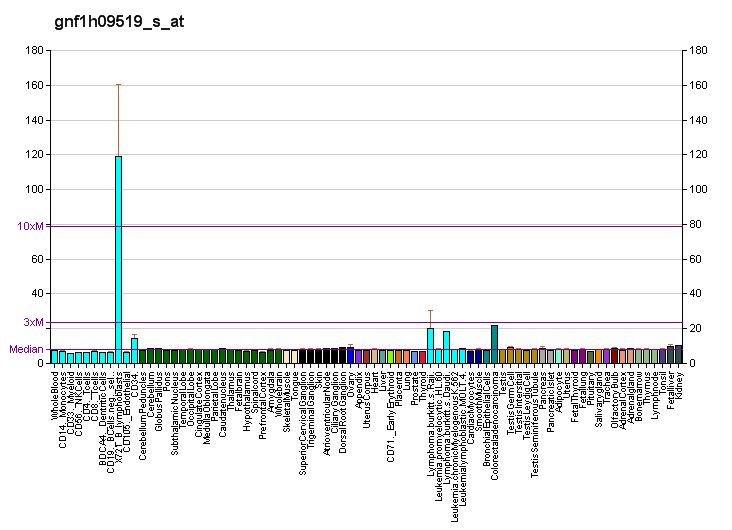
RNA expression pattern
Bgee	Human / Mouse (ortholog); Top expressed in: right uterine tube; stromal cell of endometrium; C1 segment; ventricular zone; right adrenal cortex; gonad; muscle of thigh; nucleus accumbens; prefrontal cortex; caudate nucleus / Top expressed in: seminal vesicula; yolk sac; lip; skin of external ear; calvaria; ventricular zone; endothelial cell of lymphatic vessel; medial ganglionic eminence; vestibular sensory epithelium; epidermis; More reference expression data
BioGPS	More reference expression data
Gene ontology
Molecular function	calcium ion binding; protein homodimerization activity; metal ion binding; hydrolase activity; magnesium ion binding; phosphatase activity
Cellular component	cytosol; neuron projection; cytoplasm
Biological process	response to testosterone; response to mechanical stimulus; response to nutrient levels; L-serine metabolic process; cellular amino acid biosynthetic process; dephosphorylation; L-serine biosynthetic process
Sources:Amigo / QuickGO
Orthologs
Databases	NCBI: entry; OMA: entry
Species	Human	Mouse
Entrez	5723	100678
Ensembl	ENSG00000146733	ENSMUSG00000029446
UniProt	P78330	Q99LS3
RefSeq (mRNA)	NM_004577	NM_133900
RefSeq (protein)	NP_004568; NP_001357432; NP_001357433; NP_001357434; NP_001357435 NP_001357436; NP_001357437; NP_001357438; NP_001357439; NP_001357440; NP_001357441; NP_001357442; NP_001357443; NP_001357444; NP_001357445; NP_001357446; NP_001357447; NP_001357448; NP_001357449; NP_001357450; NP_001357451	NP_598661
Location (UCSC)	Chr 7: 56.01 – 56.05 Mb	Chr 5: 129.84 – 129.86 Mb
PubMed search
- Wikidata
View/Edit Human	View/Edit Mouse

Phosphoserine phosphatase is an enzyme that in humans is encoded by the PSPH gene.

== Function ==
The protein encoded by this gene belongs to a subfamily of the phosphotransferases. This encoded enzyme is responsible for the third and last step in L-serine formation. It catalyzes magnesium-dependent hydrolysis of L-phosphoserine and is also involved in an exchange reaction between L-serine and L-phosphoserine. Deficiency of this protein is thought to be linked to Williams syndrome.

== Clinical significance ==
Homozygous or compound heterozygous mutations in PSPH cause Neu–Laxova syndrome and Phosphoserine phosphatase deficiency.
