= Renata Laxova =

American geneticist (1931–2020)

- Born: 15 July 1931; Brno, Czechoslovakia
- Died: 30 November 2020 (aged 89); Tucson, Arizona, U.S.
- Education: University of Brno
- Scientific career
- Fields: Genetics
- Workplaces: University of Wisconsin–Madison

Renata Laxova (July 15, 1931 – November 30, 2020) was a Czech American pediatric geneticist and a professor of genetics at the Departments of Pediatrics and Medical Genetics, Waisman Center, University of Wisconsin–Madison. She was the discoverer of the Neu-Laxová syndrome, a rare congenital abnormality involving multiple organs, with autosomal recessive inheritance.

== Biography ==
She was born and educated in Brno, Czechoslovakia, and survived The Holocaust by inclusion in the Kindertransport, and spent the war years in England. She returned to Czechoslovakia after the war, received a medical degree and training as a pediatrician there. Her Doctoral thesis from the University of Brno was Genetika isoamylas: Studie nového lidského polymorfismu. (in English: "Genetics of Isoamylases: Study of the New Human Polymorphism") in 1967. After the invasion of Czechoslovakia in August 1968, she escaped a second time to England, where she worked with Lionel Penrose at the Kennedy-Galton Centre for Medical and Community Genetics in London on intellectual disability. She was appointed to the faculty at the University of Wisconsin-Madison in 1975, where she worked in its research center for human developmental disabilities, the Waisman Center, on prenatal diagnosis and genetics counseling. She became professor emeritus in 2003.

== Publications ==
Laxova was the author of 64 peer-reviewed papers, as shown in Scopus. Her most cited are:

- "Diagnostic criteria for Walker-Warburg syndrome" by Dobyns, W.B., Pagon, R.A., Armstrong, D., Curry, C.J.R., Greenberg, F., Grix, A., Holmes, L.B., Laxova, R., Michels, V.V., Robinow, M., Zimmerman, R.L. American Journal of Medical Genetics Volume 32, Issue 2, 1989, Pages 195–210. Cited 207 times
- "The critical region of the human Xq" by Therman, E., Laxova, R., Susman, B. Human Genetics Volume 85, Issue 5, 1990, Pages 455-461 cited 85 times
- "Mutations of the P gene in oculocutaneous albinism, ocular albinism, and Prader-Willi syndrome plus albinism" by Lee, S.-T., Nicholls, R.D., Bundey, S., Laxova, R., Musarella, M., Spritz, R.A. New England Journal of Medicine Volume 330, Issue 8, February 24, 1994, Pages 529–534, cited 80 times.
