= Serine (data page) =

Chemical data page

The complete data for Serine
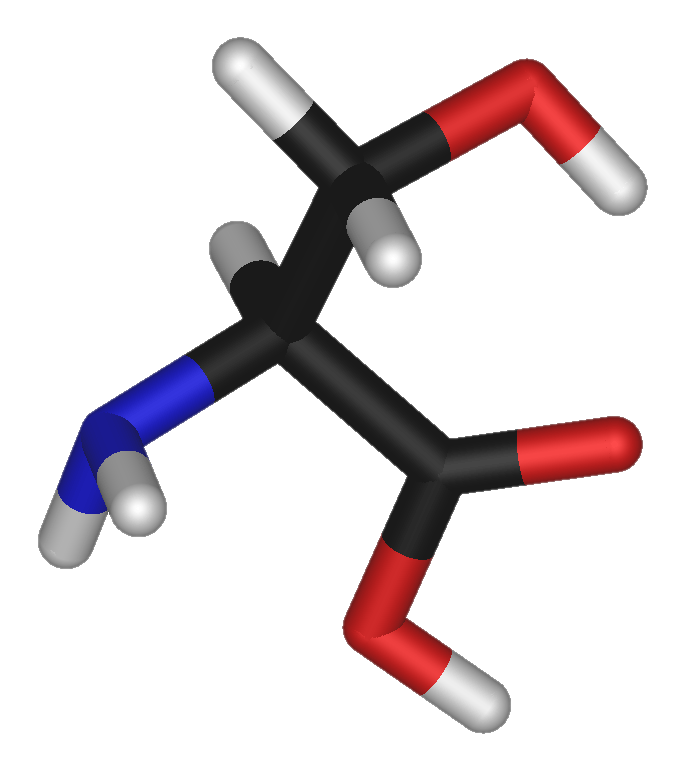
General information
Chemical formula: C_{3}H_{7}NO_{3}
Molar mass: 105.09 g·mol^{−1}
Systematic name:
-2-amino-3-hydroxypropanoic acid
Abbreviations: S, Ser
Synonyms:
none
Database data
SMILES: OCC(N)C(=O)O
InChI=1/C3H7NO3/c4-2(1-5)3(6)7/h2,5H,1,4H2,(H,6,7)/f/h6H

ATC: N/A	CAS: 56-45-1	DrugBank: N/A	EINECS: 200-274-3^{a}	PubChem: 617 (L)^{a}, 5951 (D)^{a}

Physical properties

Structure	Crystal data	Spectral data: UV-Vis / IR / NMR / MS: Masses of main fragments: GMD MS Spectrum

Phase behavior	Solid properties ρ_{solid}: 1.537 g.cm^{−3} T_{m}: 228 °C	Liquid properties	Gas properties

Hazard properties

MSDS N/A	Main hazards: N/A	NFPA 704	Flash point: N/A	RTECS number: N/A

Chemical properties

XLogP: -2.912	pI: 5.68	pK_{a}: 2.13, 9.05	Tautomers: -3.539	Hydrogen bond: donor - 3; acceptor - 4

Pharmacological properties

This box:
- Except where noted otherwise, data relate to Standard temperature and pressure.
- Reliability of data general note.
