= SPATCCM =

Rare genetic disorder

- Symptoms: microcephaly and significant developmental delay
- Causes: mutations in the SLC1A4 gene
- Treatment: anti-epileptics

Spastic tetraplegia, thin corpus callosum, and progressive microcephaly (often referred to by its acronym SPATCCM) is a rare autosomal recessive disease caused by mutations in the SLC1A4 gene encoding the ASCT1 protein. The ASCT1 protein is primarily found in astrocytes in the brain where its main role is to import L-serine, a non-essential amino acid.

== Symptoms and signs ==
Clinically, patients present with microcephaly and significant developmental delay. While some patients may be able to walk, others may not due to spasticity of limbs and hypotonic muscle tone, with progressive degeneration over time. Patients may also present with seizures, ranging from single febrile seizure to intractable epilepsy. Following brain MRI, patients may present with thin corpus callosum, decreased myelination, and/or brain atrophy. These symptoms mimic that of other L-serine deficiencies

== Cause ==
There have so far been several identified mutations in the SLC1A4 gene that are linked to SPATCCM, including several frameshift (L314Hfs*42, N324Tfs*29), nonsense (Y191*, W453*), duplication (L86_M88dup), and missense mutations (E256K, R457W, G374R, G381R, S181F). These mutations interrupt the transport of serine from astrocytes to neurones, and across the blood brain barrier

L-serine is important in brain development as it is a vital component in protein synthesis, as well as being the precursor to several essential compounds, including phosphatidylserine, sphingomyelin, glycine, and D-serine.

== Diagnosis ==
Diagnosis of SPATCCM generally relies on whole exome sequencing and the identification of a mutation in the SLC1A4 gene, while also lacking any other potential pathogenic mutations.

== Treatment ==
SPATCCM is an incurable genetic disease, however patients are often treated with anti-epileptics including vigabatrin, topiramate or clobazam, to reduce associated seizures. Supplementation of L-serine has also been proposed as a treatment. and has shown effective in a knock-in mouse model of the disease if administered prenatal and early postnatal.

== Epidemiology ==
Although most of the reported cases of SPATCCM are in people of Ashkenazi Jewish ancestry, it has also been reported in Irish, Hispanic, South Asian, Italian, Czech, Palestinian, and Pakistani ethnicities.

SPATCCM has a carrier frequency of 0.7% in the Ashkenazi Jewish population.
