= Serine =

Amino acid

Skeletal formula
Skeletal formula of L-serine
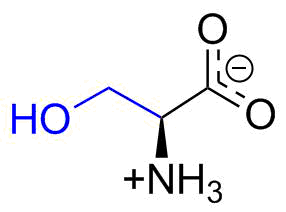
Serine at physiological pH
L-serine zwitterion
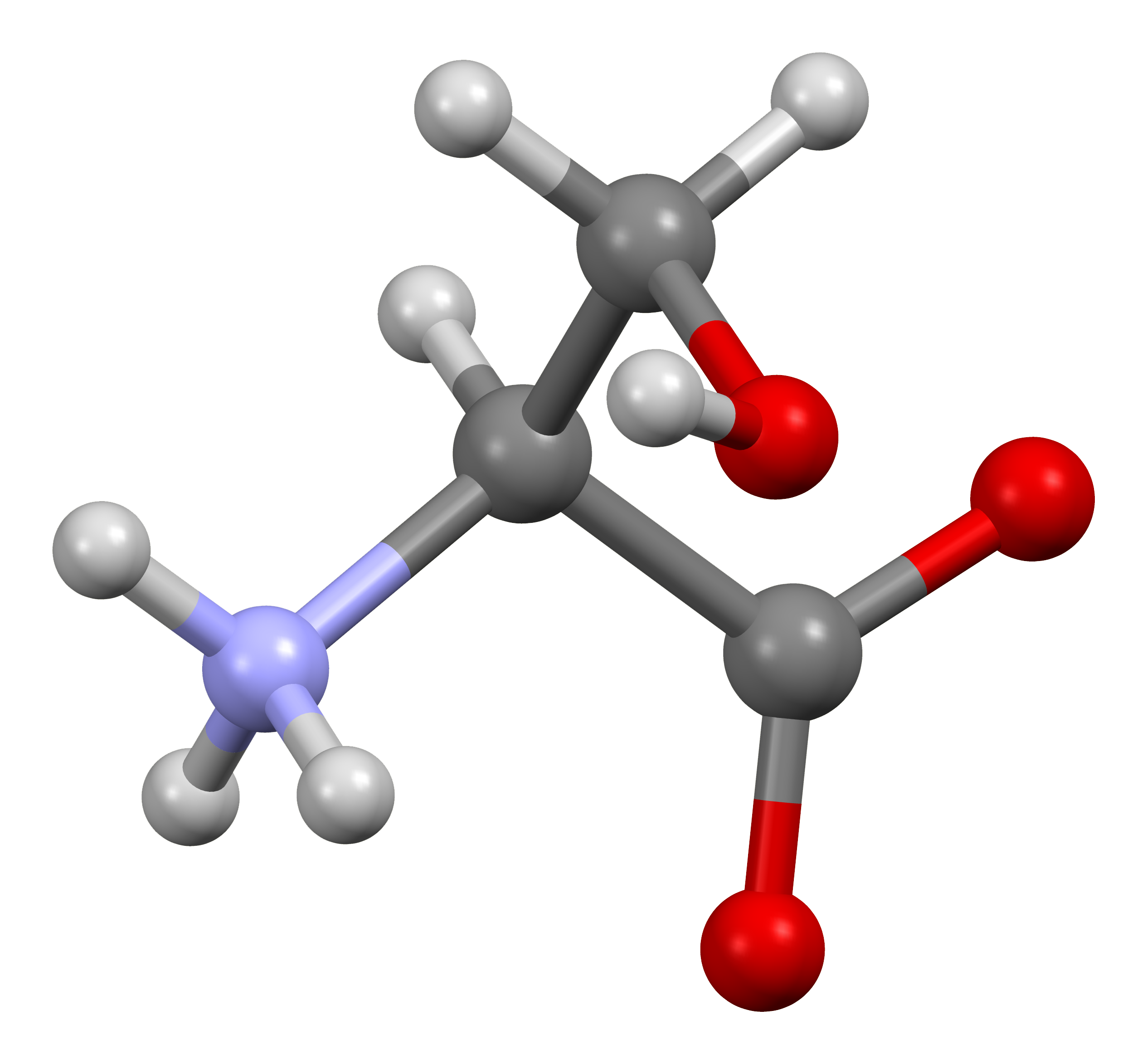
Ball-and-stick model
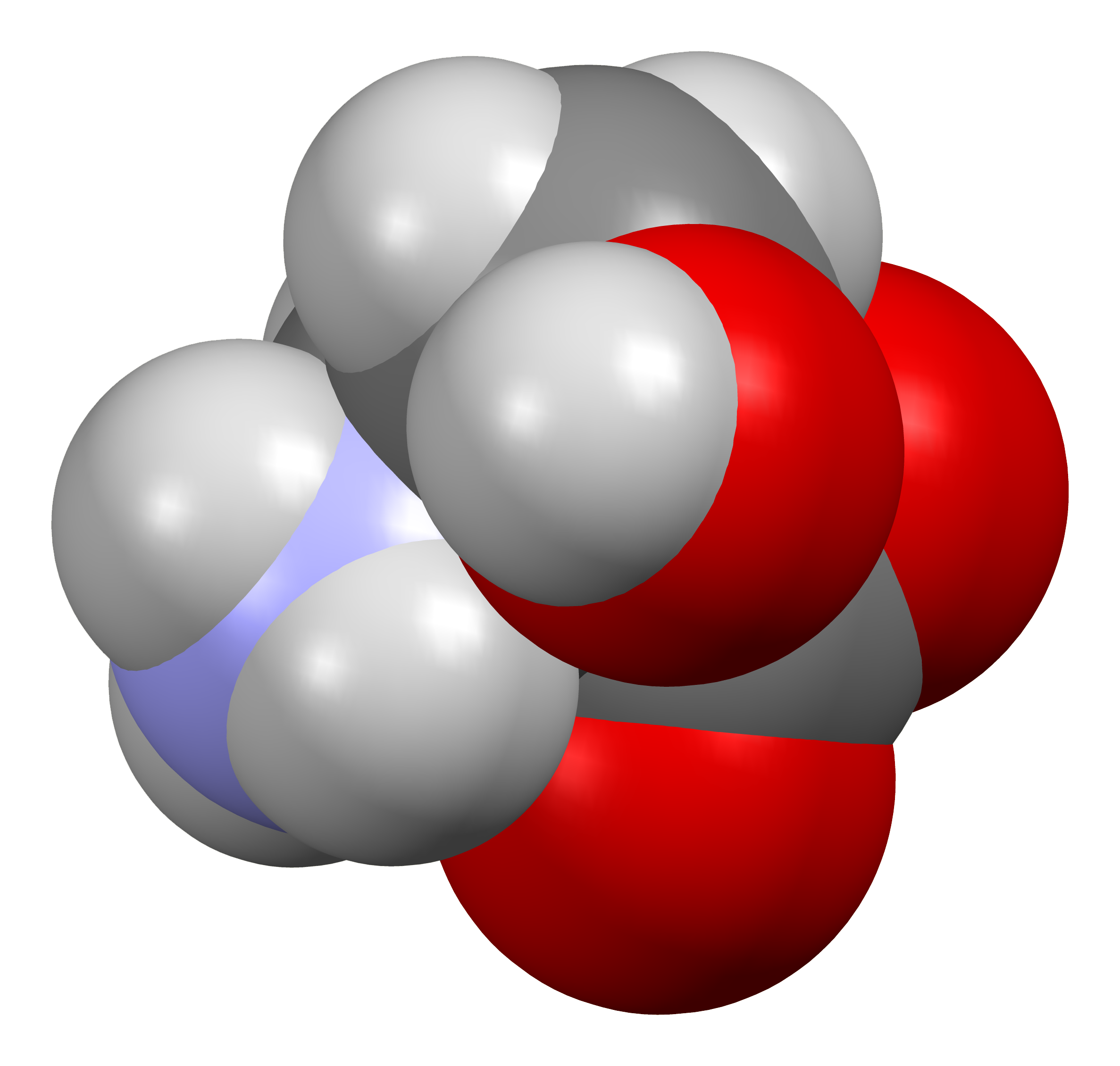
Space-filling model

Names
- IUPAC name Serine
- Systematic IUPAC name 2-Amino-3-hydroxypropanoic acid

Identifiers
CAS Number	L: 56-45-1; D/L: 302-84-1; D: 312-84-5
3D model (JSmol)	L: Interactive image; D/L Zwitterion: Interactive image
ChEBI	L: CHEBI:17115
ChEMBL	L: ChEMBL11298
ChemSpider	L: 5736; D/L: 597; D: 64231
DrugBank	L: DB00133
ECHA InfoCard	100.000.250
EC Number	L: 206-130-6
IUPHAR/BPS	L: 726
KEGG	L: C00065; D: C00740
PubChem CID	L: 5951; D/L: 617; D: 71077
UNII	L: 452VLY9402; D/L: 00PAR1C66F; D: 1K77H2Z9B1
CompTox Dashboard (EPA)	L: DTXSID60883230
- InChI: InChI=1S/C3H7NO3/c4-2(1-5)3(6)7/h2,5H,1,4H2,(H,6,7)/t2-/m0/s1 Key: MTCFGRXMJLQNBG-REOHCLBHSA-N; D/L: Key: MTCFGRXMJLQNBG-UHFFFAOYSA-N; D: Key: MTCFGRXMJLQNBG-UWTATZPHSA-N
- SMILES: L: C([C@@H](C(=O)O)N)O; D/L Zwitterion: C([C@@H](C(=O)[O-])[NH3+])O

Properties
Chemical formula	C_{3}H_{7}NO_{3}
Molar mass	105.093 g·mol^{−1}
Appearance	white crystals or powder
Density	1.603 g/cm^{3} (22 °C)
Melting point	246 °C (475 °F; 519 K) decomposes
Solubility in water	soluble
Acidity (pK_{a})	2.21 (carboxyl), 9.15 (amino)

Supplementary data page
- Serine (data page)
- Except where otherwise noted, data are given for materials in their standard state (at 25 °C [77 °F], 100 kPa). Infobox references

Serine ball and stick model spinning

Serine /ˈsɪəriːn/ (symbol Ser or S) is an α-amino acid that is used in the biosynthesis of proteins. It contains an α-amino group (which is in the protonated −NH^{+}_{3} form under biological conditions), a carboxyl group (which is in the deprotonated −COO^{−} form under biological conditions), and a side chain consisting of a hydroxymethyl group, classifying it as a polar amino acid. It can be synthesized in the human body under normal physiological circumstances, making it a nonessential amino acid. It is encoded by the codons UCU, UCC, UCA, UCG, AGU and AGC.

== Occurrence ==
L-Serine (left) and D-serine (right) in zwitterionic form at neutral pH

This compound is one of the proteinogenic amino acids. Only the L-stereoisomer appears naturally in proteins. It is not essential to the human diet, since it is synthesized in the body from other metabolites, including glycine. Serine was first obtained from silk protein, a particularly rich source, in 1865 by Emil Cramer. Its name is derived from the Latin for silk, sericum. Serine's structure was established in 1902.

== Biosynthesis ==
The biosynthesis of serine starts with the oxidation of 3-phosphoglycerate (an intermediate from glycolysis) to 3-phosphohydroxypyruvate and NADH by phosphoglycerate dehydrogenase (EC 1.1.1.95). Reductive amination (transamination) of this ketone by phosphoserine transaminase (EC 2.6.1.52) yields 3-phosphoserine (O-phosphoserine) which is hydrolyzed to serine by phosphoserine phosphatase (EC 3.1.3.3).

In bacteria such as E. coli these enzymes are encoded by the genes serA (EC 1.1.1.95), serC (EC 2.6.1.52), and serB (EC 3.1.3.3).

Serine biosynthesis

Serine hydroxymethyltransferase (SHMT) also catalyzes the biosynthesis of glycine (retro-aldol cleavage) from serine, transferring the resulting formaldehyde synthon to 5,6,7,8-tetrahydrofolate. However, that reaction is reversible, and will convert excess glycine to serine. SHMT is a pyridoxal phosphate (PLP) dependent enzyme.

== Synthesis and reactions ==
Industrially, L-serine is produced from glycine and methanol catalyzed by hydroxymethyltransferase.

Racemic serine can be prepared in the laboratory from methyl acrylate in several steps:

Hydrogenation of serine gives the diol serinol:

HOCH_{2}CH(NH_{2})COOH + 2 H_{2} → HOCH_{2}CH(NH_{2})CH_{2}OH + H_{2}O

== Biological function ==
=== Metabolic ===
Cysteine synthesis from serine. Cystathionine beta synthase catalyzes the upper reaction and cystathionine gamma-lyase catalyzes the lower reaction.

Serine is important in metabolism in that it participates in the biosynthesis of purines and pyrimidines. It is the precursor to several amino acids including glycine and cysteine, as well as tryptophan in bacteria. It is also the precursor to numerous other metabolites, including sphingolipids and folate, which is the principal donor of one-carbon fragments in biosynthesis.

=== Signaling ===
D-Serine, synthesized in neurons by serine racemase from L-serine (its enantiomer), serves as a neuromodulator by coactivating NMDA receptors, making them able to open if they then also bind glutamate. D-serine is a potent agonist at the glycine site (NR1) of canonical diheteromeric NMDA receptors. For the receptor to open, glutamate and either glycine or D-serine must bind to it; in addition a pore blocker must not be bound (e.g. Mg^{2+} or Zn^{2+}). Some research has shown that D-serine is a more potent agonist at the NMDAR glycine site than glycine itself. However, D-serine has been shown to work as an antagonist/inverse co-agonist of t-NMDA receptors through the glycine binding site on the GluN3 subunit.

== Ligands ==
D-serine was thought to exist only in bacteria until relatively recently; it was the second D amino acid discovered to naturally exist in humans, present as a signaling molecule in the brain, soon after the discovery of D-aspartate. Had D amino acids been discovered in humans sooner, the glycine site on the NMDA receptor might instead be named the D-serine site. Outside the central nervous system, D-serine plays a signaling role in peripheral tissues and organs such as cartilage, kidney, and corpus cavernosum.

=== Gustatory sensation ===
Pure D-serine is an off-white crystalline powder with a very faint musty aroma. D-Serine is sweet with an additional minor sour taste at medium and high concentrations.

== Clinical significance ==
Serine deficiency disorders are rare defects in the biosynthesis of the amino acid L-serine. At present three disorders have been reported:

- 3-phosphoglycerate dehydrogenase deficiency
- 3-phosphoserine phosphatase deficiency
- Phosphoserine aminotransferase deficiency

These enzyme defects lead to severe neurological symptoms such as congenital microcephaly and severe psychomotor retardation and in addition, in patients with 3-phosphoglycerate dehydrogenase deficiency to intractable seizures. These symptoms respond to a variable degree to treatment with L-serine, sometimes combined with glycine. Response to treatment is variable and the long-term and functional outcome is unknown. To provide a basis for improving the understanding of the epidemiology, genotype/phenotype correlation and outcome of these diseases their impact on the quality of life of patients, as well as for evaluating diagnostic and therapeutic strategies a patient registry was established by the noncommercial International Working Group on Neurotransmitter Related Disorders (iNTD).

Besides disruption of serine biosynthesis, its transport may also become disrupted. One example is spastic tetraplegia, thin corpus callosum, and progressive microcephaly, a disease caused by mutations that affect the function of the neutral amino acid transporter A.

=== Research for therapeutic use ===
The classification of L-serine as a non-essential amino acid has come to be considered as conditional, since vertebrates such as humans cannot always synthesize optimal quantities over entire lifespans. Safety of L-serine has been demonstrated in an FDA-approved human phase I clinical trial with Amyotrophic Lateral Sclerosis, ALS, patients (ClinicalTrials.gov identifier: NCT01835782), but treatment of ALS symptoms has yet to be shown. A 2011 meta-analysis found adjunctive sarcosine to have a medium effect size for negative and total symptoms of schizophrenia. There also is evidence that L‐serine could acquire a therapeutic role in diabetes.

D-Serine is being studied in rodents as a potential treatment for schizophrenia. D-Serine also has been described as a potential biomarker for early Alzheimer's disease (AD) diagnosis, due to a relatively high concentration of it in the cerebrospinal fluid of probable AD patients. D-serine, which is made in the brain, has been shown to work as an antagonist/inverse co-agonist of t-NMDA receptors mitigating neuron loss in an animal model of temporal lobe epilepsy.

D-Serine has been theorized as a potential treatment for sensorineural hearing disorders such as hearing loss and tinnitus.

== See also ==
- Isoserine
- Homoserine (isothreonine)
- Serine octamer cluster
