= Neutral amino acid transporter A =

Protein-coding gene in the species Homo sapiens

SLC1A4

Identifiers
- Aliases: SLC1A4, ASCT1, SATT, solute carrier family 1 member 4
- External IDs: OMIM: 600229; MGI: 2135601; GeneCards: SLC1A4

Gene location (Human)
| Chr. | Chromosome 2 (human) |
| Band | 2p14 | Start | 64,988,477 bp |
| Band | 2p14 | End | 65,023,865 bp |

Gene location (Mouse)
| Chr. | Chromosome 11 (mouse) |
| Band | 11 A3.1|11 12.97 cM | Start | 20,252,180 bp |
| Band | 11 A3.1|11 12.97 cM | End | 20,282,713 bp |
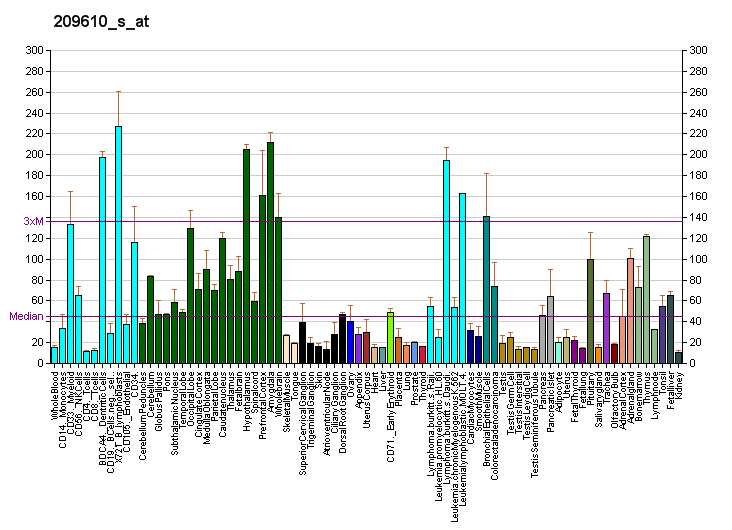

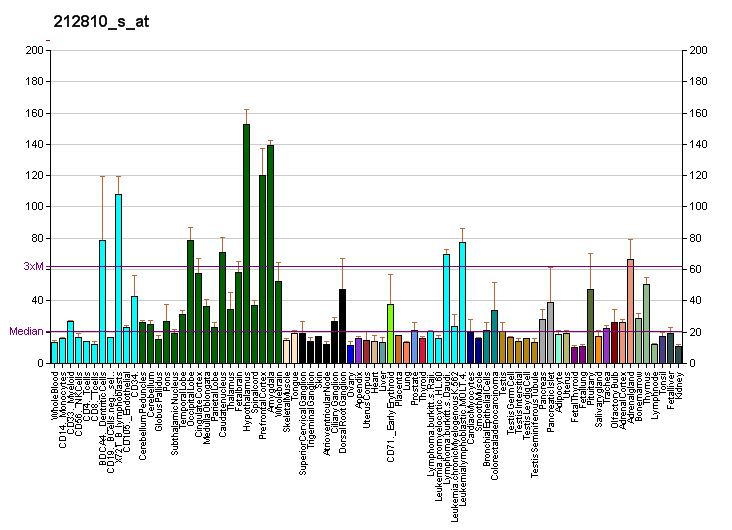

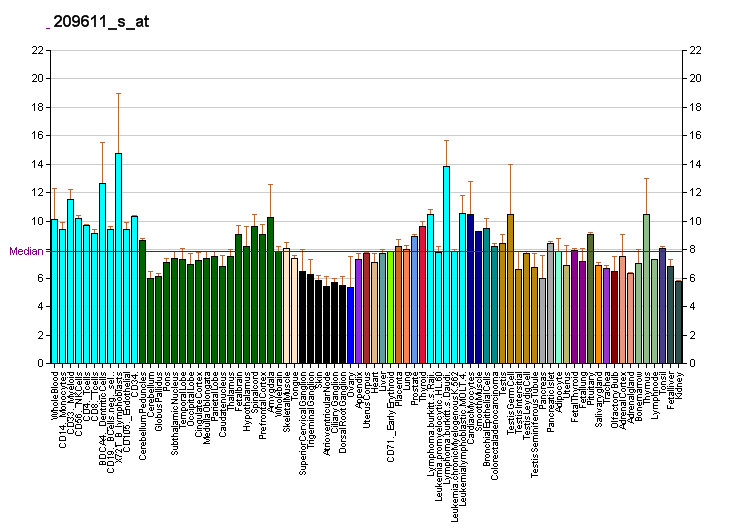
RNA expression pattern
| Bgee | Human / Mouse (ortholog); Top expressed in: buccal mucosa cell; sperm; glutes; spinal ganglia; entorhinal cortex; internal globus pallidus; nucleus accumbens; external globus pallidus; Skeletal muscle tissue of biceps brachii; middle temporal gyrus / Top expressed in: supraoptic nucleus; paraventricular nucleus of hypothalamus; arcuate nucleus; ascending aorta; crypt of lieberkuhn of small intestine; aortic valve; fossa; median eminence; deep cerebellar nuclei; medial vestibular nucleus; More reference expression data |
| BioGPS | More reference expression data |
Gene ontology
| Molecular function | L-glutamine transmembrane transporter activity; L-threonine transmembrane transporter activity; L-proline transmembrane transporter activity; L-serine transmembrane transporter activity; L-hydroxyproline transmembrane transporter activity; L-cystine transmembrane transporter activity; neutral amino acid transmembrane transporter activity; L-alanine transmembrane transporter activity; symporter activity; chloride channel activity; amino acid transmembrane transporter activity |
| Cellular component | integral component of membrane; membrane; melanosome; plasma membrane; integral component of plasma membrane; cell surface; soma; dendrite; extracellular exosome; intermediate filament; centrosome; microtubule organizing center |
| Biological process | synaptic transmission, glutamatergic; cognition; L-alanine transport; proline transport; hydroxyproline transport; amino acid transport; L-cystine transport; L-serine transport; glutamine transport; threonine transport; chloride transmembrane transport; amino acid transmembrane transport; proline transmembrane transport; transmembrane transport; chloride transport; transport |
Sources:Amigo / QuickGO
Orthologs
| Databases | NCBI: entry; OMA: entry |
| Species | Human | Mouse |
| Entrez | 6509 | 55963 |
| Ensembl | ENSG00000115902 | ENSMUSG00000020142 |
| UniProt | P43007 | O35874 |
| RefSeq (mRNA) | NM_001135581; NM_001193493; NM_003038; NM_001348406; NM_001348407 | NM_018861 |
| RefSeq (protein) | NP_001180422; NP_003029; NP_001335335; NP_001335336 | NP_061349 |
| Location (UCSC) | Chr 2: 64.99 – 65.02 Mb | Chr 11: 20.25 – 20.28 Mb |
| PubMed search |
- Wikidata
| View/Edit Human | View/Edit Mouse |

Neutral amino acid transporter A is a protein that in humans is encoded by the SLC1A4 gene. In humans, it is expressed in the brain, lung, skeletal muscle, intestine and kidney.

== Function ==
The transporter is responsible for transport of L-serine, D-serine, L-alanine, L-cysteine, and L-threonine.

== Pathology ==
Mutations of the gene cause a disease called spastic tetraplegia, thin corpus callosum, and progressive microcephaly (SPATCCM). This disorder is inherited in an autosomal recessive fashion.

== Interactions ==
In melanocytic cells SLC1A4 gene expression may be regulated by MITF.

== See also ==
- Glutamate transporter
- Solute carrier family
