= Phosphoserine phosphatase =

Class of enzymes

phosphoserine phosphatase

Identifiers
- EC no.: 3.1.3.3
- CAS no.: 9025-73-4

Databases
- BRENDA: enzyme data
- ExPASy: NiceZyme view
- KEGG: enzyme entry
- MetaCyc: metabolic pathway
- Rhea: reactions
- PDB structures: RCSB PDB PDBe PDBsum
- Gene Ontology: AmiGO / QuickGO
Search
- PMC: articles
- PubMed: articles
- NCBI: proteins

The enzyme phosphoserine phosphatase (EC 3.1.3.3) catalyzes the reversible reaction

O-phospho-L(or D)-serine + H_{2}O $\rightleftharpoons$ L(or D)-serine + phosphate

For example, with L-phosphoserine as substrate the hydrolysis reaction gives L-serine, with orthophosphate as byproduct:

phosphoserine
H_{2}O
P_{i}
H_{2}O
P_{i}
serine

The enzyme was characterised from chicken and rat liver. It is also present in humans, where it regulates glycine and D-serine levels. The reaction is the final, irreversible, step in L-serine biosynthesis.

The enzyme is classified as a hydrolase, specifically one acting on phosphoric monoester bonds. The systematic name is O-phosphoserine phosphohydrolase.

== Structural studies ==
As of late 2007, 12 structures have been solved for this class of enzymes, with PDB accession codes PDB: 1F5S, PDB: 1J97, PDB: 1L7M, PDB: 1L7N, PDB: 1L7O, PDB: 1L7P, PDB: 1L8L, PDB: 1L8O, PDB: 1NNL, PDB: 2J6Y, PDB: 2J6Z, and PDB: 2J70.
