= Phosphoglycerate dehydrogenase =

Metabolic enzyme PHGDH

PHGDH
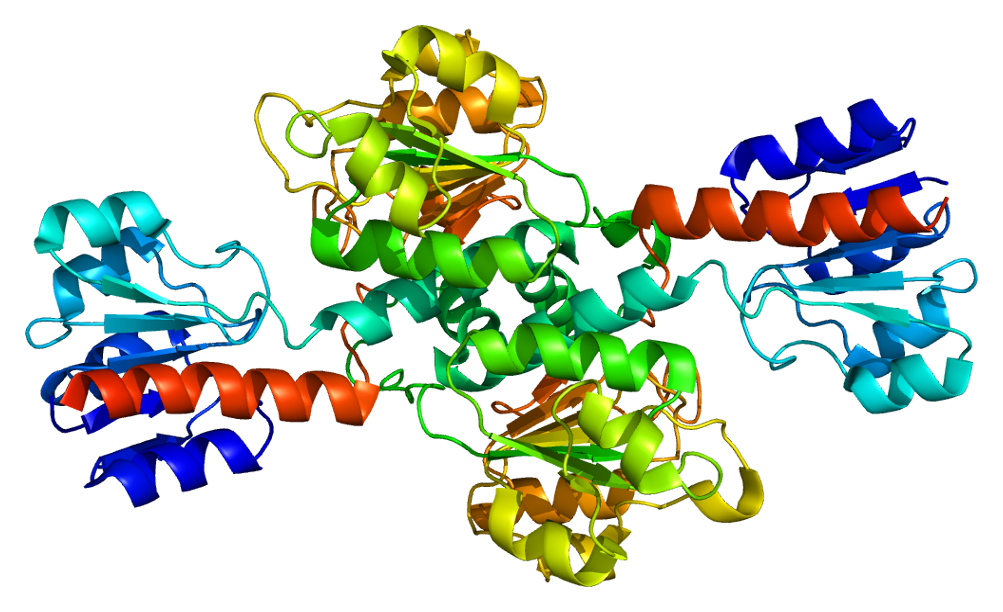
Available structures
PDB	Ortholog search: PDBe RCSB
PDB	List of PDB id codes 2G76

Identifiers
- Aliases: PHGDH, 3-PGDH, 3PGDH, HEL-S-113, NLS, PDG, PGAD, PGD, PGDH, PHGDHD, SERA, NLS1, Phosphoglycerate dehydrogenase
- External IDs: OMIM: 606879; MGI: 1355330; HomoloGene: 39318; GeneCards: PHGDH; OMA:PHGDH - orthologs

Gene location (Human)
Chr.	Chromosome 1 (human)
Band	1p12	Start	119,648,411 bp
Band	1p12	End	119,744,218 bp

Gene location (Mouse)
Chr.	Chromosome 3 (mouse)
Band	3|3 F2.2	Start	98,220,486 bp
Band	3|3 F2.2	End	98,247,306 bp
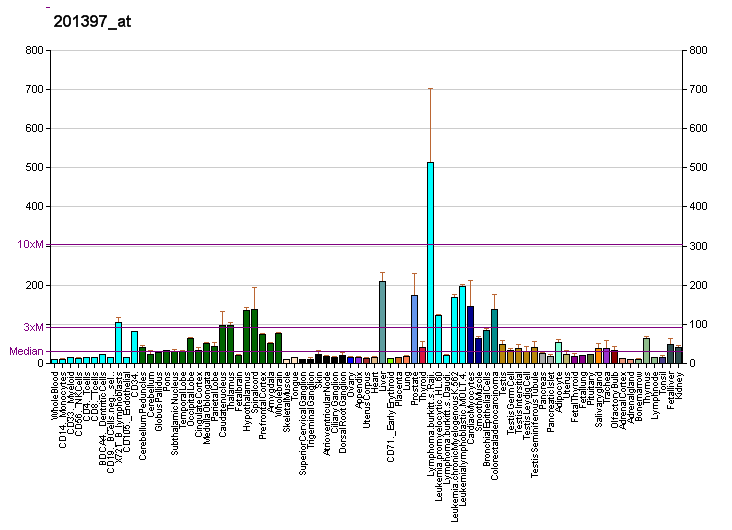
RNA expression pattern
Bgee	Human / Mouse (ortholog); Top expressed in: ventricular zone; ganglionic eminence; C1 segment; amygdala; nucleus accumbens; caudate nucleus; right lobe of liver; putamen; body of pancreas; stromal cell of endometrium / Top expressed in: ventricular zone; morula; epithelium of lens; calvaria; yolk sac; retinal pigment epithelium; parotid gland; lacrimal gland; epiblast; lip; More reference expression data
BioGPS	More reference expression data
Gene ontology
Molecular function	oxidoreductase activity, acting on the CH-OH group of donors, NAD or NADP as acceptor; NAD binding; phosphoglycerate dehydrogenase activity; electron transfer activity; oxidoreductase activity; L-malate dehydrogenase activity
Cellular component	cytosol; extracellular exosome
Biological process	L-serine biosynthetic process; brain development; metabolism; cellular amino acid biosynthetic process; electron transport chain; cellular amino acid metabolic process; glutamine metabolic process; glycine metabolic process; L-serine metabolic process; threonine metabolic process; gamma-aminobutyric acid metabolic process; regulation of gene expression; taurine metabolic process; spinal cord development; glial cell development; neural tube development; neurogenesis; neuron projection development; G1 to G0 transition
Sources:Amigo / QuickGO
Orthologs
Species	Human	Mouse
Entrez	26227	236539
Ensembl	ENSG00000092621	ENSMUSG00000053398
UniProt	O43175	Q61753
RefSeq (mRNA)	NM_006623; NM_032692	NM_016966
RefSeq (protein)	NP_006614	NP_058662
Location (UCSC)	Chr 1: 119.65 – 119.74 Mb	Chr 3: 98.22 – 98.25 Mb
PubMed search
- Wikidata
View/Edit Human	View/Edit Mouse

phosphoglycerate dehydrogenase

Identifiers
- EC no.: 1.1.1.95

Databases
- IntEnz: IntEnz view
- BRENDA: BRENDA entry
- ExPASy: NiceZyme view
- KEGG: KEGG entry
- MetaCyc: metabolic pathway
- PRIAM: profile
- PDB structures: RCSB PDB PDBe PDBsum
Search
- PMC: articles
- PubMed: articles
- NCBI: proteins

Phosphoglycerate dehydrogenase (PHGDH) is an enzyme that catalyzes two individual chemical reactions.

3-phosphoglyceric acid
+ NAD^{+}
H^{+}
H^{+}
3-phospho-hydroxypyruvic acid
+ NADH

In the first reaction, the two substrates are 3-phosphoglyceric acid and oxidised nicotinamide adenine dinucleotide (NAD^{+}). Its products are phosphohydroxypyruvic acid (i.e. 3-phosphonooxypyruvic acid), reduced NADH, and a proton. This enzyme can also catalyse the interconversion of α-hydroxyglutaric acid and α-ketoglutaric acid using the same cofactors.

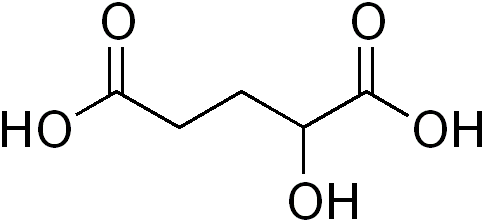
α-Hydroxyglutaric acid
+ NAD^{+}
H^{+}
H^{+}
α-Ketoglutaric acid
+ NADH

As of 2012, the most widely studied variants of PHGDH are from the E. coli and M. tuberculosis genomes. In humans, this enzyme is encoded by the PHGDH gene.

== Function ==
3-Phosphoglycerate dehydrogenase catalyzes the transition of 3-phosphoglycerate into 3-phosphohydroxypyruvate, which is the committed step in the phosphorylated pathway of L-serine biosynthesis. It is also essential in cysteine and glycine synthesis, which lie further downstream. This pathway represents the only way to synthesize serine in most organisms except plants, which uniquely possess multiple synthetic pathways. Nonetheless, the phosphorylated pathway that PHGDH participates in is still suspected to have an essential role in serine synthesis used in the developmental signaling of plants.

Because of serine and glycine's role as neurotrophic factors in the developing brain, PHGDH has been shown to have high expression in glial and astrocyte cells during neural development.

== Mechanism and regulation ==
3-phosphoglycerate dehydrogenase works via an induced fit mechanism to catalyze the transfer of a hydride from the substrate to NAD+, a required cofactor. In its active conformation, the enzyme's active site has multiple cationic residues that likely stabilize the transition state of the reaction between the negatively charged substrate and NAD^{+}. The positioning is such that the substrate's alpha carbon and the C4 of the nicotinamide ring are brought into a proximity that facilitates the hydride transfer producing NADH and the oxidized substrate.

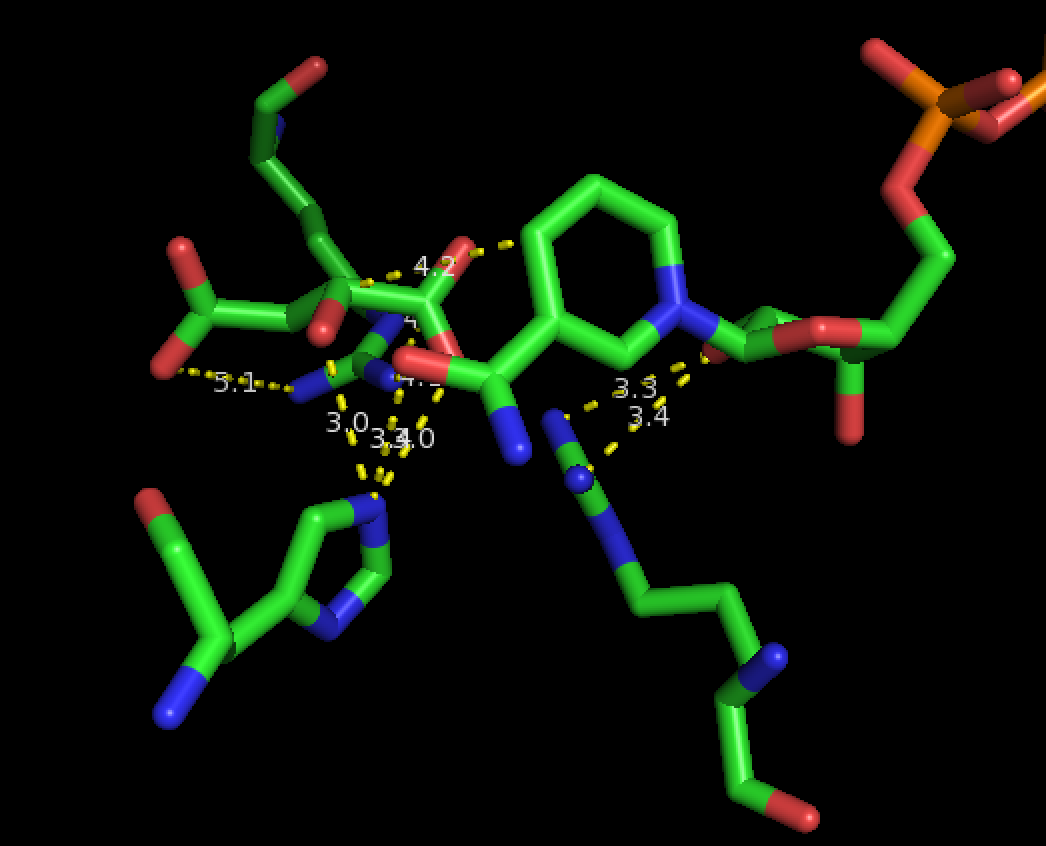
Active site of human PHGDH. Key residues (two Arg and one His) and substrates shown. The 4.2 Å distance is between the carbons undergoing hydride transfer. From 2G76 rendering of PHGDH crystallized with NAD^{+} and D-malate.

PHGDH is allosterically regulated by its downstream product, L-serine. This feedback inhibition is understandable considering that 3-phosphoglycerate is an intermediate in the glycolytic pathway. Given that PHGDH represents the committed step in the production of serine in the cell, flux through the pathway must be carefully controlled.

L-serine binding has been shown to exhibit cooperative behavior. Mutants that decreased this cooperativity also increased in sensitivity to serine's allosteric inhibition, suggesting a separation of the chemical mechanisms that result in allosteric binding cooperativity and active site inhibition. The mechanism of inhibition is Vmax type, indicating that serine affects the reaction rate rather than the binding affinity of the active site.

Although L-serine's allosteric effects are usually the focus of regulatory investigation, it has been noted that in some variants of the enzyme, 3-phosphoglycerate dehydrogenase is inhibited at separate positively charged allosteric site by high concentrations of its own substrate.

== Structure ==
3-Phosphoglycerate dehydrogenase is a tetramer, composed of four identical, asymmetric subunits. At any time, only a maximum of two adjacent subunits present a catalytically active site; the other two are forced into an inactive conformation. This results in half-of-the-sites activity with regard to both active and allosteric sites, meaning that only the two sites of the active subunits must be bound for essentially maximal effect with regard to catalysis and inhibition respectively. There is some evidence that further inhibition occurs with the binding of the third and fourth serine molecules, but it is relatively minimal.

The subunits from the E. coli PHGDH have three distinct domains, whereas those from M. tuberculosis have four. It is noted that the human enzyme more closely resembles that of M. tuberculosis, including the site for allosteric substrate inhibition. Concretely, three general types of PHGDH have been proposed: Type I, II, and III. Type III has two distinct domains, lacks both allosteric sites, and is found in various unicellular organisms. Type II has serine binding sites and encompasses the well-studied E. coli PHGDH. Type I possesses both the serine and substrate allosteric binding sites and encompasses M. tuberculosis and mammalian PHGDHs.

The regulation of catalytic activity is thought to be a result of the movement of rigid domains about flexible “hinges.” When the substrate binds to the open active site, the hinge rotates and closes the cleft. Allosteric inhibition thus likely works by locking the hinge in a state that produces the open active site cleft.

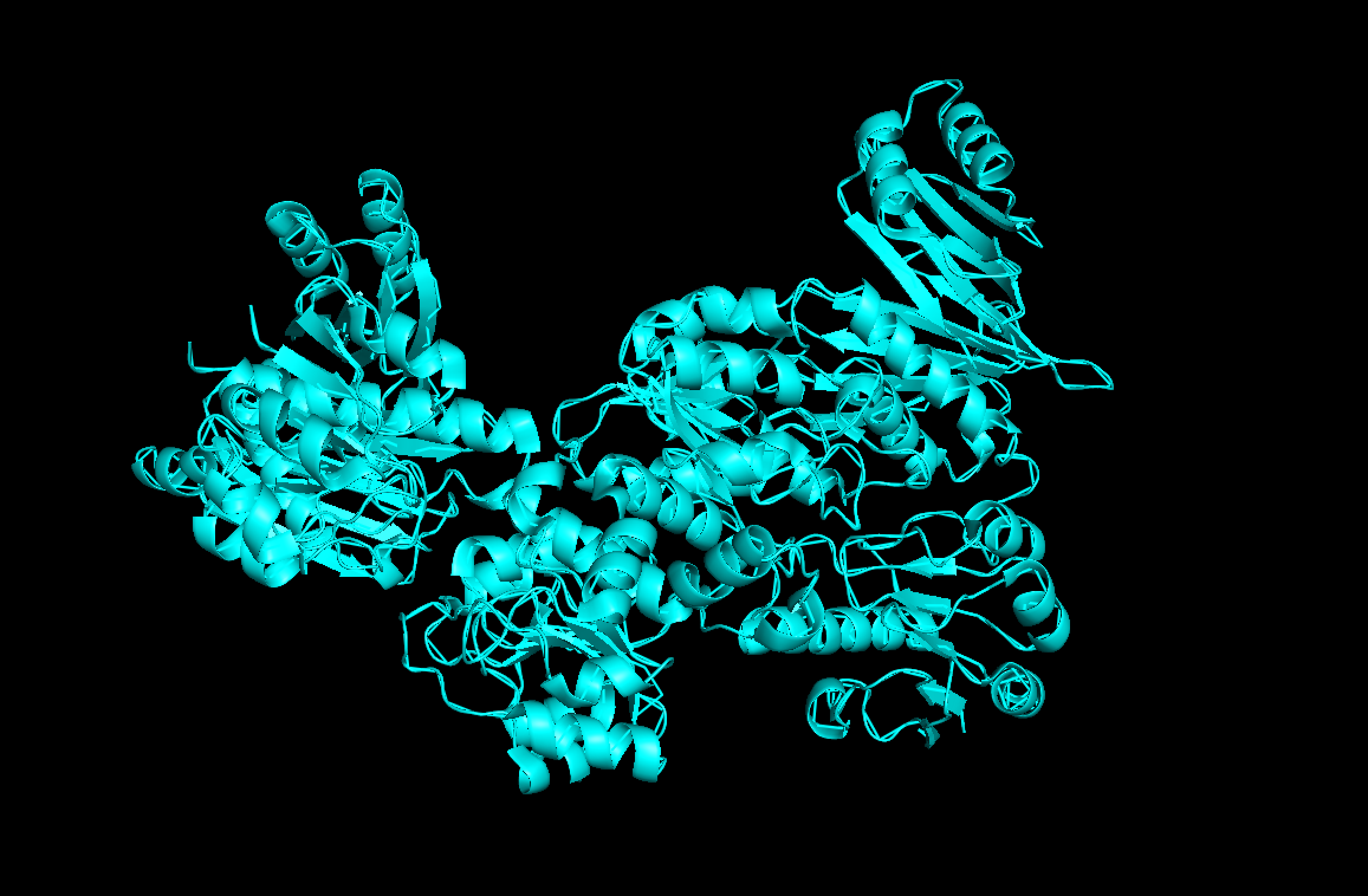
Crystal structure of inhibited PHGDH from M. tuberculosis due to allosterically bound serine. From 3DC2 rendering.

The variant from M. tuberculosis also exhibits an uncommon dual pH optimum for catalytic activity.

== Evolution ==
3-Phosphoglycerate dehydrogenase possesses less than 20% homology to other NAD-dependent oxidoreductases and exhibits significant variance between species. There does appear to be conservation in specific binding domain residues, but there is still some variation in the positively charged active site residues between variants. For example, Type III PHGDH enzymes can be broken down into two subclasses where the key histidine residue is replaced with a lysine residue.

== Disease relevance ==
Homozygous or compound heterozygous mutations in 3-phosphoglycerate dehydrogenase cause Neu–Laxova syndrome and phosphoglycerate dehydrogenase deficiency. In addition significantly shortening lifespan, PHGDH deficiencies are known to cause congenital microcephaly, psychomotor retardation, and intractable seizures in both humans and rats, presumably due to the essential signaling within the nervous system that serine, glycine, and other downstream molecules are intimately involved with. Treatment typically involves oral supplementation of serine and glycine and has been shown most effective when started in utero via oral ingestion by the mother.

Mutations that result in increased PHGDH activity are also associated with increased risk of oncogenesis, including certain breast cancers. This finding suggests that pathways providing an outlet for diverting carbon out of glycolysis may be beneficial for rapid cell growth.

It has been reported that PHGDH can also catalyze the conversion of alpha-ketoglutarate to 2-Hydroxyglutaric acid in certain variants. Thus, a mutation in the enzyme is hypothesized to contribute to 2-Hydroxyglutaric aciduria in humans, although there is debate as to whether or not this catalysis is shared by human PHGDH.

Research results suggest that PHGDH could serve as a blood biomarker of Alzheimer's disease.
