= Phosphohydroxypyruvic acid =

Names
- Preferred IUPAC name 2-Oxo-3-(phosphonooxy)propanoic acid

Identifiers
CAS Number	3913-50-6
3D model (JSmol)	Interactive image
ChEBI	CHEBI:30933
ChemSpider	103
ECHA InfoCard	100.164.559
KEGG	C03232
MeSH	Phosphohydroxypyruvic+acid
PubChem CID	105
UNII	ZX4PWG857L
CompTox Dashboard (EPA)	DTXSID70959935
- InChI: InChI=1S/C3H5O7P/c4-2(3(5)6)1-10-11(7,8)9/h1H2,(H,5,6)(H2,7,8,9) Key: LFLUCDOSQPJJBE-UHFFFAOYSA-N
- SMILES: C(C(=O)C(=O)O)OP(=O)(O)O

Properties
Chemical formula	C_{3}H_{5}O_{7}P
Molar mass	184.040 g·mol^{−1}
- Except where otherwise noted, data are given for materials in their standard state (at 25 °C [77 °F], 100 kPa). Infobox references

Phosphohydroxypyruvic acid is an organic acid most widely known as an intermediate in the synthesis of serine.

It is produced from 3-phosphoglyceric acid by the action of the enzyme phosphoglycerate dehydrogenase.

3-phosphoglyceric acid
+ NAD^{+}
H^{+}
H^{+}
phosphohydroxypyruvic acid
+ NADH
