= Phosphoserine =

l-Phosphoserine
- Skeletal formula

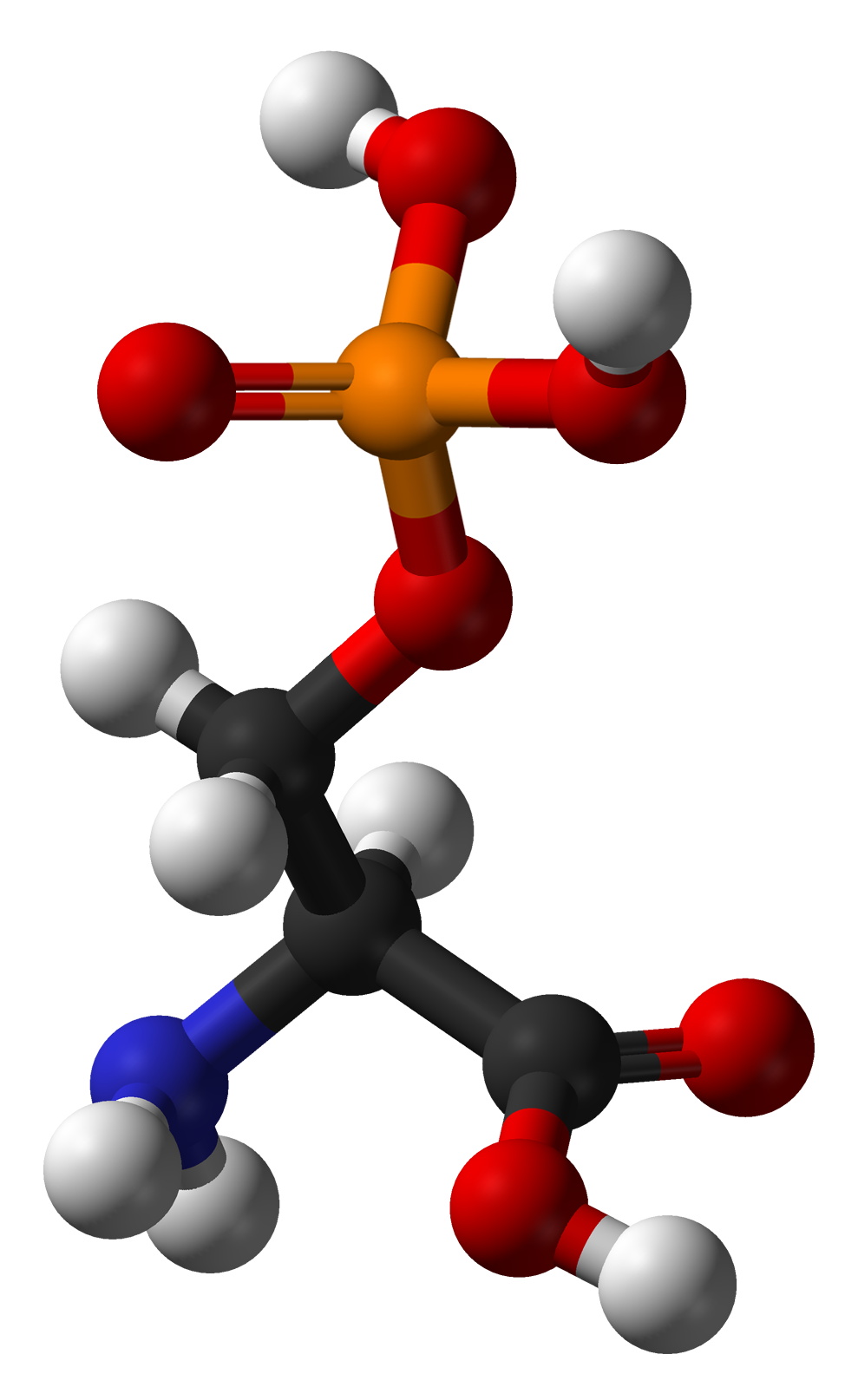
- Ball-and-stick model

Names
- IUPAC name (S)-2-Amino-3-(phosphonooxy)propionic acid
- Other names L-O-Phosphoserine

Identifiers
CAS Number	407-41-0
3D model (JSmol)	Interactive image
ChEBI	CHEBI:15811
ChEMBL	ChEMBL284377
ChemSpider	62074
DrugBank	DB04522
ECHA InfoCard	100.006.352
EC Number	206-986-0
IUPHAR/BPS	1411
KEGG	C01005
MeSH	Phosphoserine
PubChem CID	106
UNII	VI4F0K069V
CompTox Dashboard (EPA)	DTXSID1046348
- InChI: InChI=1S/C3H8NO6P/c4-2(3(5)6)1-10-11(7,8)9/h2H,1,4H2,(H,5,6)(H2,7,8,9)/t2-/m0/s1 Key: BZQFBWGGLXLEPQ-REOHCLBHSA-N; InChI=1/C3H8NO6P/c4-2(3(5)6)1-10-11(7,8)9/h2H,1,4H2,(H,5,6)(H2,7,8,9)/t2-/m0/s1
- SMILES: O=P(O)(O)OC[C@@H](C(=O)O)N

Properties
Chemical formula	C_{3}H_{8}NO_{6}P
Molar mass	185.073 g/mol
Melting point	228 °C (442 °F; 501 K)
- Except where otherwise noted, data are given for materials in their standard state (at 25 °C [77 °F], 100 kPa). verify (what is ?) Infobox references

Phosphoserine (abbreviated as SEP or J) is an ester of serine and phosphoric acid. Phosphoserine is a component of many proteins as the result of posttranslational modifications. The phosphorylation of the alcohol functional group in serine to produce phosphoserine is catalyzed by various types of kinases. Through the use of technologies that utilize an expanded genetic code, phosphoserine can also be incorporated into proteins during translation.

It is a normal metabolite found in human biofluids.

Phosphoserine has three potential coordination sites (carboxyl, amine and phosphate group) Determination of the mode of coordination between phosphorylated ligands and metal ions occurring in an organism is a first step to explain the function of the phosphoserine in bioinorganic processes.
