= List of MeSH codes (D08) =

The following is a partial list of the "D" codes for Medical Subject Headings (MeSH), as defined by the United States National Library of Medicine (NLM).

This list continues the information at List of MeSH codes (D06). Codes following these are found at List of MeSH codes (D09). For other MeSH codes, see List of MeSH codes.

The source for this content is the MeSH Browser from the NLM.

== MeSH D08 – enzymes and coenzymes ==
=== MeSH D08.211 – coenzymes ===
==== MeSH D08.211.090 – biopterins ====
- MeSH D08.211.090.500 – neopterin

==== MeSH D08.211.211 – coenzyme a ====
- MeSH D08.211.211.300 – acyl coenzyme a
- MeSH D08.211.211.300.075 – acetyl coenzyme a
- MeSH D08.211.211.300.500 – malonyl coenzyme a
- MeSH D08.211.211.300.700 – palmitoyl coenzyme a

==== MeSH D08.211.474 – flavins ====
- MeSH D08.211.474.650 – riboflavin
- MeSH D08.211.474.650.249 – flavin-adenine dinucleotide
- MeSH D08.211.474.650.500 – flavin mononucleotide

==== MeSH D08.211.532 – molybdenum cofactors ====
- MeSH D08.211.532.500 – molybdoferredoxin

==== MeSH D08.211.790 – sphingolipid activator proteins ====
- MeSH D08.211.790.249 – g(m2) activator protein
- MeSH D08.211.790.500 – saposins

==== MeSH D08.211.840 – tetrahydrofolates ====
- MeSH D08.211.840.300 – formyltetrahydrofolates
- MeSH D08.211.840.300.500 – leucovorin

=== MeSH D08.244 – cytochromes ===
==== MeSH D08.244.175 – cytochrome a group ====
- MeSH D08.244.175.249 – cytochromes a
- MeSH D08.244.175.500 – cytochromes a1
- MeSH D08.244.175.600 – cytochromes a3

==== MeSH D08.244.187 – cytochrome b group ====
- MeSH D08.244.187.249 – cytochromes b
- MeSH D08.244.187.500 – cytochromes b5
- MeSH D08.244.187.600 – cytochromes b6

==== MeSH D08.244.286 – cytochrome c group ====
- MeSH D08.244.286.100 – cytochromes c
- MeSH D08.244.286.150 – cytochromes c'
- MeSH D08.244.286.200 – cytochromes c1
- MeSH D08.244.286.300 – cytochromes c2
- MeSH D08.244.286.600 – cytochromes c6

==== MeSH D08.244.453 – cytochrome p-450 enzyme system ====
- MeSH D08.244.453.003 – cytochrome p-450 cyp2j2
- MeSH D08.244.453.005 – aryl hydrocarbon hydroxylases
- MeSH D08.244.453.005.050 – aniline hydroxylase
- MeSH D08.244.453.005.110 – benzopyrene hydroxylase
- MeSH D08.244.453.005.332 – cytochrome p-450 cyp1a1
- MeSH D08.244.453.005.443 – cytochrome p-450 cyp1a2
- MeSH D08.244.453.005.500 – cytochrome p-450 cyp1b1
- MeSH D08.244.453.005.550 – cytochrome p-450 cyp2b1
- MeSH D08.244.453.005.575 – cytochrome p-450 cyp2b6
- MeSH D08.244.453.005.590 – cytochrome p-450 cyp2c8
- MeSH D08.244.453.005.600 – cytochrome p-450 cyp2d6
- MeSH D08.244.453.012 – camphor 5-monooxygenase
- MeSH D08.244.453.100 – cytochrome p450 family 1
- MeSH D08.244.453.100.500 – cytochrome p-450 cyp1a1
- MeSH D08.244.453.100.750 – cytochrome p-450 cyp1a2
- MeSH D08.244.453.100.875 – cytochrome p-450 cyp1b1
- MeSH D08.244.453.484 – cytochrome p450 family 11
- MeSH D08.244.453.484.250 – cholesterol side-chain cleavage enzyme
- MeSH D08.244.453.484.500 – cytochrome p-450 cyp11b2
- MeSH D08.244.453.484.750 – steroid 11-beta-hydroxylase
- MeSH D08.244.453.485 – cytochrome p450 family 12
- MeSH D08.244.453.487 – cytochrome p450 family 17
- MeSH D08.244.453.487.500 – steroid 17-alpha-hydroxylase
- MeSH D08.244.453.489 – cytochrome p450 family 19
- MeSH D08.244.453.489.500 – aromatase
- MeSH D08.244.453.491 – cytochrome p450 family 2
- MeSH D08.244.453.491.250 – cytochrome p-450 cyp2a6
- MeSH D08.244.453.491.313 – cytochrome p-450 cyp2b1
- MeSH D08.244.453.491.344 – cytochrome p-450 cyp2b6
- MeSH D08.244.453.491.368 – cytochrome p-450 cyp2c8
- MeSH D08.244.453.491.372 – cytochrome p-450 cyp2d6
- MeSH D08.244.453.491.375 – cytochrome p-450 cyp2e1
- MeSH D08.244.453.491.500 – limonene hydroxylases
- MeSH D08.244.453.491.500.500 – cytochrome p-450 cyp2c9
- MeSH D08.244.453.491.500.700 – cytochrome p-450 cyp2c19
- MeSH D08.244.453.493 – cytochrome p450 family 21
- MeSH D08.244.453.493.500 – steroid 21-hydroxylase
- MeSH D08.244.453.496 – cytochrome p450 family 24
- MeSH D08.244.453.496.500 – vitamin d3 24-hydroxylase
- MeSH D08.244.453.498 – cytochrome p450 family 26
- MeSH D08.244.453.498.500 – retinoic acid 4-hydroxylase
- MeSH D08.244.453.499 – cytochrome p450 family 27
- MeSH D08.244.453.499.500 – 25-hydroxyvitamin d3 1-alpha-hydroxylase
- MeSH D08.244.453.499.750 – cholestanetriol 26-monooxygenase
- MeSH D08.244.453.860 – cytochrome p450 family 3
- MeSH D08.244.453.860.500 – cytochrome p-450 cyp3a
- MeSH D08.244.453.870 – cytochrome p450 family 4
- MeSH D08.244.453.870.500 – cytochrome p-450 cyp4a
- MeSH D08.244.453.875 – cytochrome p450 family 46
- MeSH D08.244.453.875.500 – cholesterol 24-hydroxylase
- MeSH D08.244.453.878 – cytochrome p450 family 51
- MeSH D08.244.453.878.500 – sterol 14-demethylase
- MeSH D08.244.453.880 – cytochrome p450 family 6
- MeSH D08.244.453.890 – cytochrome p450 family 7
- MeSH D08.244.453.890.500 – cholesterol 7-alpha-hydroxylase
- MeSH D08.244.453.900 – cytochrome p450 family 8
- MeSH D08.244.453.900.500 – steroid 12-alpha-hydroxylase
- MeSH D08.244.453.915 – steroid hydroxylases
- MeSH D08.244.453.915.025 – cholesterol 24-hydroxylase
- MeSH D08.244.453.915.050 – cytochrome p-450 cyp11b2
- MeSH D08.244.453.915.099 – aromatase
- MeSH D08.244.453.915.149 – cholestanetriol 26-monooxygenase
- MeSH D08.244.453.915.200 – cholesterol 7-alpha-hydroxylase
- MeSH D08.244.453.915.212 – cholesterol side-chain cleavage enzyme
- MeSH D08.244.453.915.400 – 25-hydroxyvitamin d3 1-alpha-hydroxylase
- MeSH D08.244.453.915.730 – steroid 12-alpha-hydroxylase
- MeSH D08.244.453.915.737 – steroid 16-alpha-hydroxylase
- MeSH D08.244.453.915.748 – steroid 17-alpha-hydroxylase
- MeSH D08.244.453.915.750 – steroid 11-beta-hydroxylase
- MeSH D08.244.453.915.760 – steroid 21-hydroxylase
- MeSH D08.244.453.915.880 – sterol 14-demethylase
- MeSH D08.244.453.957 – trans-cinnamate 4-monooxygenase

=== MeSH D08.622 – enzyme precursors ===
==== MeSH D08.622.509 – pepsinogens ====
- MeSH D08.622.509.700 – pepsinogen a
- MeSH D08.622.509.725 – pepsinogen c

==== MeSH D08.622.610 – plasminogen ====
- MeSH D08.622.610.500 – angiostatins

=== MeSH D08.811 – enzymes ===
==== MeSH D08.811.037 – deubiquitinating enzymes ====
- MeSH D08.811.037.250 – ataxin-3
- MeSH D08.811.037.375 – deubiquitinating enzyme cyld
- MeSH D08.811.037.500 – ubiquitin thiolesterase
- MeSH D08.811.037.750 – ubiquitin-specific proteases
- MeSH D08.811.037.750.250 – cop9 signalosome complex
- MeSH D08.811.037.750.500 – tumor necrosis factor alpha-induced protein 3
- MeSH D08.811.037.750.750 – ubiquitin-specific peptidase 7

==== MeSH D08.811.074 – dna repair enzymes ====
- MeSH D08.811.074.062 – alkb enzymes
- MeSH D08.811.074.062.500 – alkb homolog 1, histone h2a dioxygenase
- MeSH D08.811.074.062.750 – alkb homolog 2, alpha-ketoglutarate-dependent dioxygenase
- MeSH D08.811.074.062.875 – alkb homolog 3, alpha-ketoglutarate-dependent dioxygenase
- MeSH D08.811.074.062.937 – alkb homolog 5, rna demethylase
- MeSH D08.811.074.062.968 – alpha-ketoglutarate-dependent dioxygenase fto
- MeSH D08.811.074.124 – deoxyribodipyrimidine photo-lyase
- MeSH D08.811.074.249 – dna glycosylases
- MeSH D08.811.074.249.500 – dna-formamidopyrimidine glycosylase
- MeSH D08.811.074.249.750 – thymine dna glycosylase
- MeSH D08.811.074.249.875 – uracil-dna glycosidase
- MeSH D08.811.074.500 – dna ligases
- MeSH D08.811.074.500.500 – dna ligase atp
- MeSH D08.811.074.750 – dna-(apurinic or apyrimidinic site) lyase
- MeSH D08.811.074.766 – mutl proteins
- MeSH D08.811.074.766.250 – mismatch repair endonuclease pms2
- MeSH D08.811.074.766.500 – mutl protein homolog 1
- MeSH D08.811.074.844 – muts proteins
- MeSH D08.811.074.844.500 – muts dna mismatch-binding protein
- MeSH D08.811.074.844.750 – muts homolog 2 protein
- MeSH D08.811.074.875 – polynucleotide 5'-hydroxyl-kinase

==== MeSH D08.811.150 – dna restriction-modification enzymes ====
- MeSH D08.811.150.240 – dna modification methylases
- MeSH D08.811.150.280 – dna restriction enzymes
- MeSH D08.811.150.280.250 – deoxyribonucleases, type i site-specific
- MeSH D08.811.150.280.260 – deoxyribonucleases, type ii site-specific
- MeSH D08.811.150.280.260.240 – deoxyribonuclease bamhi
- MeSH D08.811.150.280.260.300 – deoxyribonuclease ecori
- MeSH D08.811.150.280.260.400 – deoxyribonuclease hindiii
- MeSH D08.811.150.280.260.420 – deoxyribonuclease hpaii
- MeSH D08.811.150.280.270 – deoxyribonucleases, type iii site-specific

==== MeSH D08.811.255 – holoenzymes ====
- MeSH D08.811.255.500 – apoenzymes

==== MeSH D08.811.277 – hydrolases ====
- MeSH D08.811.277.040 – acid anhydride hydrolases
- MeSH D08.811.277.040.013 – aaa proteins
- MeSH D08.811.277.040.013.500 – atpases associated with diverse cellular activities
- MeSH D08.811.277.040.013.500.032 – atp-dependent proteases
- MeSH D08.811.277.040.013.500.032.099 – atp-dependent endopeptidases
- MeSH D08.811.277.040.013.500.032.099.500 – endopeptidase clp
- MeSH D08.811.277.040.013.500.032.099.750 – protease la
- MeSH D08.811.277.040.013.500.063 – dyneins
- MeSH D08.811.277.040.013.500.063.500 – axonemal dyneins
- MeSH D08.811.277.040.013.500.063.750 – cytoplasmic dyneins
- MeSH D08.811.277.040.013.500.250 – katanin
- MeSH D08.811.277.040.013.500.375 – n-ethylmaleimide-sensitive proteins
- MeSH D08.811.277.040.013.500.438 – replication protein c
- MeSH D08.811.277.040.013.500.500 – spastin
- MeSH D08.811.277.040.013.500.750 – valosin containing protein
- MeSH D08.811.277.040.019 – acylphosphatase
- MeSH D08.811.277.040.025 – adenosine triphosphatases
- MeSH D08.811.277.040.025.024 – atpases associated with diverse cellular activities
- MeSH D08.811.277.040.025.024.032 – atp-dependent proteases
- MeSH D08.811.277.040.025.024.032.099 – atp-dependent endopeptidases
- MeSH D08.811.277.040.025.024.032.099.500 – endopeptidase clp
- MeSH D08.811.277.040.025.024.032.099.750 – protease la
- MeSH D08.811.277.040.025.024.063 – dyneins
- MeSH D08.811.277.040.025.024.063.500 – axonemal dyneins
- MeSH D08.811.277.040.025.024.063.750 – cytoplasmic dyneins
- MeSH D08.811.277.040.025.024.250 – katanin
- MeSH D08.811.277.040.025.024.375 – n-ethylmaleimide-sensitive proteins
- MeSH D08.811.277.040.025.024.438 – replication protein c
- MeSH D08.811.277.040.025.024.500 – spastin
- MeSH D08.811.277.040.025.024.750 – valosin containing protein
- MeSH D08.811.277.040.025.047 – arsenite transporting atpases
- MeSH D08.811.277.040.025.095 – ca(2 ) mg(2 )-atpase
- MeSH D08.811.277.040.025.142 – chaperonins
- MeSH D08.811.277.040.025.142.500 – group i chaperonins
- MeSH D08.811.277.040.025.142.500.500 – chaperonin 60
- MeSH D08.811.277.040.025.142.750 – group ii chaperonins
- MeSH D08.811.277.040.025.142.750.500 – chaperonin containing tcp-1
- MeSH D08.811.277.040.025.142.750.750 – thermosomes
- MeSH D08.811.277.040.025.159 – dna helicases
- MeSH D08.811.277.040.025.159.001 – dna excision repair protein ercc-5
- MeSH D08.811.277.040.025.159.124 – dnab helicases
- MeSH D08.811.277.040.025.159.155 – ku autoantigen
- MeSH D08.811.277.040.025.159.186 – minichromosome maintenance proteins
- MeSH D08.811.277.040.025.159.186.200 – minichromosome maintenance complex component 2
- MeSH D08.811.277.040.025.159.186.300 – minichromosome maintenance complex component 3
- MeSH D08.811.277.040.025.159.186.400 – minichromosome maintenance complex component 4
- MeSH D08.811.277.040.025.159.186.500 – minichromosome maintenance complex component 5
- MeSH D08.811.277.040.025.159.186.600 – minichromosome maintenance complex component 6
- MeSH D08.811.277.040.025.159.186.700 – minichromosome maintenance complex component 7
- MeSH D08.811.277.040.025.159.186.800 – minichromosome maintenance complex component 8
- MeSH D08.811.277.040.025.159.186.900 – minichromosome maintenance complex component 9
- MeSH D08.811.277.040.025.159.249 – recq helicases
- MeSH D08.811.277.040.025.159.249.500 – werner syndrome helicase
- MeSH D08.811.277.040.025.159.500 – xeroderma pigmentosum group d protein
- MeSH D08.811.277.040.025.176 – mi-2 nucleosome remodeling and deacetylase complex
- MeSH D08.811.277.040.025.193 – molecular motor proteins
- MeSH D08.811.277.040.025.193.249 – dyneins
- MeSH D08.811.277.040.025.193.249.500 – axonemal dyneins
- MeSH D08.811.277.040.025.193.249.750 – cytoplasmic dyneins
- MeSH D08.811.277.040.025.193.500 – kinesins
- MeSH D08.811.277.040.025.193.750 – myosins
- MeSH D08.811.277.040.025.193.750.249 – myosin heavy chains
- MeSH D08.811.277.040.025.193.750.500 – myosin type i
- MeSH D08.811.277.040.025.193.750.750 – myosin type ii
- MeSH D08.811.277.040.025.193.750.750.124 – cardiac myosins
- MeSH D08.811.277.040.025.193.750.750.124.249 – atrial myosins
- MeSH D08.811.277.040.025.193.750.750.124.500 – ventricular myosins
- MeSH D08.811.277.040.025.193.750.750.374 – nonmuscle myosin type iia
- MeSH D08.811.277.040.025.193.750.750.500 – nonmuscle myosin type iib
- MeSH D08.811.277.040.025.193.750.750.750 – skeletal muscle myosins
- MeSH D08.811.277.040.025.193.750.750.875 – smooth muscle myosins
- MeSH D08.811.277.040.025.193.750.812 – myosin type iii
- MeSH D08.811.277.040.025.193.750.843 – myosin type iv
- MeSH D08.811.277.040.025.193.750.875 – myosin type v
- MeSH D08.811.277.040.025.193.750.937 – myosin viia
- MeSH D08.811.277.040.025.215 – mutl proteins
- MeSH D08.811.277.040.025.215.250 – mismatch repair endonuclease pms2
- MeSH D08.811.277.040.025.215.500 – mutl protein homolog 1
- MeSH D08.811.277.040.025.292 – muts proteins
- MeSH D08.811.277.040.025.292.500 – muts dna mismatch-binding protein
- MeSH D08.811.277.040.025.292.750 – muts homolog 2 protein
- MeSH D08.811.277.040.025.314 – p-type atpases
- MeSH D08.811.277.040.025.314.250 – calcium-transporting atpases
- MeSH D08.811.277.040.025.314.250.249 – plasma membrane calcium-transporting atpases
- MeSH D08.811.277.040.025.314.250.500 – sarcoplasmic reticulum calcium-transporting atpases
- MeSH D08.811.277.040.025.314.500 – copper-transporting atpases
- MeSH D08.811.277.040.025.314.625 – h( )-k( )-exchanging atpase
- MeSH D08.811.277.040.025.314.750 – sodium-potassium-exchanging atpase
- MeSH D08.811.277.040.025.325 – proton-translocating atpases
- MeSH D08.811.277.040.025.325.249 – bacterial proton-translocating atpases
- MeSH D08.811.277.040.025.325.500 – chloroplast proton-translocating atpases
- MeSH D08.811.277.040.025.325.750 – mitochondrial proton-translocating atpases
- MeSH D08.811.277.040.025.325.813 – prorenin receptor
- MeSH D08.811.277.040.025.325.875 – vacuolar proton-translocating atpases
- MeSH D08.811.277.040.025.494 – seca proteins
- MeSH D08.811.277.040.050 – apyrase
- MeSH D08.811.277.040.190 – bis(5'-adenosyl)triphosphatase
- MeSH D08.811.277.040.330 – gtp phosphohydrolases
- MeSH D08.811.277.040.330.200 – dynamins
- MeSH D08.811.277.040.330.200.100 – dynamin i
- MeSH D08.811.277.040.330.200.200 – dynamin ii
- MeSH D08.811.277.040.330.200.300 – dynamin iii
- MeSH D08.811.277.040.330.300 – gtp-binding proteins
- MeSH D08.811.277.040.330.300.100 – gtp phosphohydrolase-linked elongation factors
- MeSH D08.811.277.040.330.300.100.101 – peptide elongation factor 1
- MeSH D08.811.277.040.330.300.100.102 – peptide elongation factor 2
- MeSH D08.811.277.040.330.300.100.200 – peptide elongation factor g
- MeSH D08.811.277.040.330.300.100.700 – peptide elongation factor tu
- MeSH D08.811.277.040.330.300.200 – heterotrimeric gtp-binding proteins
- MeSH D08.811.277.040.330.300.200.100 – gtp-binding protein alpha subunits
- MeSH D08.811.277.040.330.300.200.100.100 – gtp-binding protein alpha subunits, g12-g13
- MeSH D08.811.277.040.330.300.200.100.200 – gtp-binding protein alpha subunits, gi-go
- MeSH D08.811.277.040.330.300.200.100.200.500 – gtp-binding protein alpha subunit, gi2
- MeSH D08.811.277.040.330.300.200.100.300 – gtp-binding protein alpha subunits, gq-g11
- MeSH D08.811.277.040.330.300.200.100.400 – gtp-binding protein alpha subunits, gs
- MeSH D08.811.277.040.330.300.200.800 – transducin
- MeSH D08.811.277.040.330.300.400 – monomeric gtp-binding proteins
- MeSH D08.811.277.040.330.300.400.100 – adp-ribosylation factors
- MeSH D08.811.277.040.330.300.400.100.050 – adp-ribosylation factor 6
- MeSH D08.811.277.040.330.300.400.100.100 – adp-ribosylation factor 1
- MeSH D08.811.277.040.330.300.400.400 – rab gtp-binding proteins
- MeSH D08.811.277.040.330.300.400.400.001 – rab11 gtp-binding proteins
- MeSH D08.811.277.040.330.300.400.400.025 – rab1 gtp-binding proteins
- MeSH D08.811.277.040.330.300.400.400.050 – rab2 gtp-binding protein
- MeSH D08.811.277.040.330.300.400.400.075 – rab27 gtp-binding proteins
- MeSH D08.811.277.040.330.300.400.400.100 – rab3 gtp-binding proteins
- MeSH D08.811.277.040.330.300.400.400.100.500 – rab3a gtp-binding protein
- MeSH D08.811.277.040.330.300.400.400.150 – rab4 gtp-binding proteins
- MeSH D08.811.277.040.330.300.400.400.200 – rab5 gtp-binding proteins
- MeSH D08.811.277.040.330.300.400.400.600 – rab7 gtp-binding proteins
- MeSH D08.811.277.040.330.300.400.450 – ral gtp-binding proteins
- MeSH D08.811.277.040.330.300.400.462 – ran gtp-binding protein
- MeSH D08.811.277.040.330.300.400.475 – rap gtp-binding proteins
- MeSH D08.811.277.040.330.300.400.475.100 – rap1 gtp-binding proteins
- MeSH D08.811.277.040.330.300.400.488 – ras homolog enriched in brain protein
- MeSH D08.811.277.040.330.300.400.500 – ras proteins
- MeSH D08.811.277.040.330.300.400.500.300 – oncogene protein p21(ras)
- MeSH D08.811.277.040.330.300.400.500.600 – proto-oncogene proteins p21(ras)
- MeSH D08.811.277.040.330.300.400.700 – rho gtp-binding proteins
- MeSH D08.811.277.040.330.300.400.700.050 – cdc42 gtp-binding protein
- MeSH D08.811.277.040.330.300.400.700.060 – cdc42 gtp-binding protein, saccharomyces cerevisiae
- MeSH D08.811.277.040.330.300.400.700.100 – rac gtp-binding proteins
- MeSH D08.811.277.040.330.300.400.700.100.500 – rac1 gtp-binding protein
- MeSH D08.811.277.040.330.300.400.700.100.750 – rac2 gtp-binding protein
- MeSH D08.811.277.040.330.300.400.700.200 – rhoa gtp-binding protein
- MeSH D08.811.277.040.330.300.400.700.300 – rhob gtp-binding protein
- MeSH D08.811.277.040.330.300.400.700.650 – rhoc gtp-binding protein
- MeSH D08.811.277.040.330.300.550 – myxovirus resistance proteins
- MeSH D08.811.277.040.330.300.700 – septins
- MeSH D08.811.277.040.465 – nucleoside-triphosphatase
- MeSH D08.811.277.040.600 – pyrophosphatases
- MeSH D08.811.277.040.600.399 – inorganic pyrophosphatase
- MeSH D08.811.277.040.600.500 – inosine triphosphatase
- MeSH D08.811.277.040.600.600 – nudix hydrolases
- MeSH D08.811.277.040.600.600.500 – thiamine pyrophosphatase
- MeSH D08.811.277.040.725 – sam domain and hd domain-containing protein 1
- MeSH D08.811.277.040.850 – thiamin-triphosphatase
- MeSH D08.811.277.063 – adenosylhomocysteinase
- MeSH D08.811.277.087 – amidohydrolases
- MeSH D08.811.277.087.030 – n-acetylmuramoyl-l-alanine amidase
- MeSH D08.811.277.087.060 – allophanate hydrolase
- MeSH D08.811.277.087.100 – arylformamidase
- MeSH D08.811.277.087.116 – asparaginase
- MeSH D08.811.277.087.125 – aspartylglucosylaminase
- MeSH D08.811.277.087.153 – fatty acid amide hydrolases
- MeSH D08.811.277.087.180 – beta-lactamases
- MeSH D08.811.277.087.180.229 – cephalosporinase
- MeSH D08.811.277.087.180.697 – penicillinase
- MeSH D08.811.277.087.200 – biotinidase
- MeSH D08.811.277.087.250 – ceramidases
- MeSH D08.811.277.087.250.100 – acid ceramidase
- MeSH D08.811.277.087.250.300 – alkaline ceramidase
- MeSH D08.811.277.087.250.650 – neutral ceramidase
- MeSH D08.811.277.087.280 – dihydroorotase
- MeSH D08.811.277.087.483 – glutaminase
- MeSH D08.811.277.087.520 – histone deacetylases
- MeSH D08.811.277.087.520.200 – group iii histone deacetylases
- MeSH D08.811.277.087.520.200.650 – sirtuins
- MeSH D08.811.277.087.520.200.650.100 – sirtuin 1
- MeSH D08.811.277.087.520.200.650.200 – sirtuin 2
- MeSH D08.811.277.087.520.200.650.600 – sirtuin 3
- MeSH D08.811.277.087.520.275 – histone deacetylase 3
- MeSH D08.811.277.087.520.350 – histone deacetylase 6
- MeSH D08.811.277.087.520.500 – mi-2 nucleosome remodeling and deacetylase complex
- MeSH D08.811.277.087.520.500.100 – histone deacetylase 1
- MeSH D08.811.277.087.520.500.200 – histone deacetylase 2
- MeSH D08.811.277.087.520.500.775 – retinoblastoma-binding protein 4
- MeSH D08.811.277.087.520.500.887 – retinoblastoma-binding protein 7
- MeSH D08.811.277.087.520.750 – sin3 histone deacetylase and corepressor complex
- MeSH D08.811.277.087.520.750.100 – histone deacetylase 1
- MeSH D08.811.277.087.520.750.200 – histone deacetylase 2
- MeSH D08.811.277.087.520.750.775 – retinoblastoma-binding protein 4
- MeSH D08.811.277.087.520.750.887 – retinoblastoma-binding protein 7
- MeSH D08.811.277.087.610 – nicotinamidase
- MeSH D08.811.277.087.690 – penicillin amidase
- MeSH D08.811.277.087.725 – peptide-n4-(n-acetyl-beta-glucosaminyl) asparagine amidase
- MeSH D08.811.277.087.760 – pyroglutamate hydrolase
- MeSH D08.811.277.087.902 – urease
- MeSH D08.811.277.151 – aminohydrolases
- MeSH D08.811.277.151.300 – gtp cyclohydrolase
- MeSH D08.811.277.151.350 – guanine deaminase
- MeSH D08.811.277.151.418 – methenyltetrahydrofolate cyclohydrolase
- MeSH D08.811.277.151.486 – nucleoside deaminases
- MeSH D08.811.277.151.486.075 – adenosine deaminase
- MeSH D08.811.277.151.486.250 – cytidine deaminase
- MeSH D08.811.277.151.486.250.250 – aicda (activation-induced cytidine deaminase)
- MeSH D08.811.277.151.486.250.500 – apobec deaminases
- MeSH D08.811.277.151.486.250.500.500 – apobec-1 deaminase
- MeSH D08.811.277.151.486.250.500.750 – apobec-3g deaminase
- MeSH D08.811.277.151.486.625 – cytosine deaminase
- MeSH D08.811.277.151.653 – nucleotide deaminases
- MeSH D08.811.277.151.653.060 – amp deaminase
- MeSH D08.811.277.151.653.200 – dcmp deaminase
- MeSH D08.811.277.300 – complement activating enzymes
- MeSH D08.811.277.300.280 – complement c1r
- MeSH D08.811.277.300.290 – complement c1s
- MeSH D08.811.277.300.450 – complement factor d
- MeSH D08.811.277.340 – epoxide hydrolases
- MeSH D08.811.277.352 – esterases
- MeSH D08.811.277.352.100 – carboxylic ester hydrolases
- MeSH D08.811.277.352.100.050 – acetylesterase
- MeSH D08.811.277.352.100.100 – carboxylesterase
- MeSH D08.811.277.352.100.170 – cholinesterases
- MeSH D08.811.277.352.100.170.176 – acetylcholinesterase
- MeSH D08.811.277.352.100.170.250 – butyrylcholinesterase
- MeSH D08.811.277.352.100.220 – dehydroascorbatase
- MeSH D08.811.277.352.100.400 – lipase
- MeSH D08.811.277.352.100.400.745 – pancrelipase
- MeSH D08.811.277.352.100.430 – lipoprotein lipase
- MeSH D08.811.277.352.100.500 – monoacylglycerol lipases
- MeSH D08.811.277.352.100.550 – naphthol as d esterase
- MeSH D08.811.277.352.100.680 – phospholipases
- MeSH D08.811.277.352.100.680.510 – lysophospholipase
- MeSH D08.811.277.352.100.680.510.001 – lysophospholipase d
- MeSH D08.811.277.352.100.680.750 – phospholipases a
- MeSH D08.811.277.352.100.680.750.875 – phospholipases a1
- MeSH D08.811.277.352.100.680.750.937 – phospholipases a2
- MeSH D08.811.277.352.100.680.750.937.249 – 1-alkyl-2-acetylglycerophosphocholine esterase
- MeSH D08.811.277.352.100.680.750.937.300 – phospholipases a2, calcium-independent
- MeSH D08.811.277.352.100.680.750.937.300.249 – group vi phospholipases a2
- MeSH D08.811.277.352.100.680.750.937.300.500 – peroxiredoxin vi
- MeSH D08.811.277.352.100.680.750.937.625 – phospholipases a2, cytosolic
- MeSH D08.811.277.352.100.680.750.937.625.249 – group iv phospholipases a2
- MeSH D08.811.277.352.100.680.750.937.625.624 – peroxiredoxin vi
- MeSH D08.811.277.352.100.680.750.937.750 – phospholipases a2, secretory
- MeSH D08.811.277.352.100.680.750.937.750.100 – group i phospholipases a2
- MeSH D08.811.277.352.100.680.750.937.750.100.500 – group ia phospholipases a2
- MeSH D08.811.277.352.100.680.750.937.750.100.750 – group ib phospholipases a2
- MeSH D08.811.277.352.100.680.750.937.750.550 – group ii phospholipases a2
- MeSH D08.811.277.352.100.680.750.937.750.662 – group iii phospholipases a2
- MeSH D08.811.277.352.100.680.750.937.750.775 – group v phospholipases a2
- MeSH D08.811.277.352.100.680.750.937.750.887 – group x phospholipases a2
- MeSH D08.811.277.352.100.700 – sterol esterase
- MeSH D08.811.277.352.335 – deoxyribonucleases
- MeSH D08.811.277.352.335.350 – endodeoxyribonucleases
- MeSH D08.811.277.352.335.350.137 – deoxyribonuclease (pyrimidine dimer)
- MeSH D08.811.277.352.335.350.250 – deoxyribonuclease i
- MeSH D08.811.277.352.335.350.250.900 – streptodornase and streptokinase
- MeSH D08.811.277.352.335.350.275 – deoxyribonuclease iv (phage t4-induced)
- MeSH D08.811.277.352.335.350.300 – dna restriction enzymes
- MeSH D08.811.277.352.335.350.300.250 – deoxyribonucleases, type i site-specific
- MeSH D08.811.277.352.335.350.300.260 – deoxyribonucleases, type ii site-specific
- MeSH D08.811.277.352.335.350.300.260.240 – deoxyribonuclease bamhi
- MeSH D08.811.277.352.335.350.300.260.250 – deoxyribonuclease ecori
- MeSH D08.811.277.352.335.350.300.260.260 – deoxyribonuclease hindiii
- MeSH D08.811.277.352.335.350.300.260.300 – deoxyribonuclease hpaii
- MeSH D08.811.277.352.335.350.300.270 – deoxyribonucleases, type iii site-specific
- MeSH D08.811.277.352.335.350.400 – holliday junction resolvases
- MeSH D08.811.277.352.335.350.500 – micrococcal nuclease
- MeSH D08.811.277.352.335.350.600 – mismatch repair endonuclease pms2
- MeSH D08.811.277.352.335.350.650 – mre11 homologue protein
- MeSH D08.811.277.352.335.350.675 – meiotic recombination protein spo11
- MeSH D08.811.277.352.335.350.700 – single-strand specific dna and rna endonucleases
- MeSH D08.811.277.352.335.350.850 – transcription activator-like effector nucleases
- MeSH D08.811.277.352.335.350.925 – zinc finger nucleases
- MeSH D08.811.277.352.335.375 – exodeoxyribonucleases
- MeSH D08.811.277.352.335.375.750 – exodeoxyribonuclease v
- MeSH D08.811.277.352.335.375.813 – mre11 homologue protein
- MeSH D08.811.277.352.335.375.875 – werner syndrome helicase
- MeSH D08.811.277.352.355 – endonucleases
- MeSH D08.811.277.352.355.325 – endodeoxyribonucleases
- MeSH D08.811.277.352.355.325.150 – crispr-associated protein 9
- MeSH D08.811.277.352.355.325.300 – dna restriction enzymes
- MeSH D08.811.277.352.355.325.300.250 – deoxyribonucleases, type i site-specific
- MeSH D08.811.277.352.355.325.300.260 – deoxyribonucleases, type ii site-specific
- MeSH D08.811.277.352.355.325.300.260.240 – deoxyribonuclease bamhi
- MeSH D08.811.277.352.355.325.300.260.250 – deoxyribonuclease ecori
- MeSH D08.811.277.352.355.325.300.260.260 – deoxyribonuclease hindiii
- MeSH D08.811.277.352.355.325.300.260.300 – deoxyribonuclease hpaii
- MeSH D08.811.277.352.355.325.300.270 – deoxyribonucleases, type iii site-specific
- MeSH D08.811.277.352.355.325.350 – flap endonucleases
- MeSH D08.811.277.352.355.325.400 – holliday junction resolvases
- MeSH D08.811.277.352.355.325.500 – micrococcal nuclease
- MeSH D08.811.277.352.355.325.600 – mre11 homologue protein
- MeSH D08.811.277.352.355.325.650 – meiotic recombination protein spo11
- MeSH D08.811.277.352.355.325.700 – single-strand specific dna and rna endonucleases
- MeSH D08.811.277.352.355.325.850 – zinc finger nucleases
- MeSH D08.811.277.352.355.350 – endoribonucleases
- MeSH D08.811.277.352.355.350.500 – micrococcal nuclease
- MeSH D08.811.277.352.355.350.700 – ribonuclease h
- MeSH D08.811.277.352.355.350.700.500 – ribonuclease h, human immunodeficiency virus
- MeSH D08.811.277.352.355.350.715 – ribonuclease, pancreatic
- MeSH D08.811.277.352.355.350.725 – ribonuclease t1
- MeSH D08.811.277.352.355.350.810 – rna-induced silencing complex
- MeSH D08.811.277.352.355.350.810.500 – argonaute proteins
- MeSH D08.811.277.352.355.350.820 – single-strand specific dna and rna endonucleases
- MeSH D08.811.277.352.365 – exonucleases
- MeSH D08.811.277.352.365.290 – exodeoxyribonucleases
- MeSH D08.811.277.352.365.290.250 – mre11 homologue protein
- MeSH D08.811.277.352.365.290.500 – werner syndrome helicase
- MeSH D08.811.277.352.365.300 – exoribonucleases
- MeSH D08.811.277.352.640 – phosphoric diester hydrolases
- MeSH D08.811.277.352.640.050 – annexin a3
- MeSH D08.811.277.352.640.150 – 3',5'-cyclic-amp phosphodiesterases
- MeSH D08.811.277.352.640.150.100 – cyclic nucleotide phosphodiesterases, type 1
- MeSH D08.811.277.352.640.150.200 – cyclic nucleotide phosphodiesterases, type 2
- MeSH D08.811.277.352.640.150.300 – cyclic nucleotide phosphodiesterases, type 3
- MeSH D08.811.277.352.640.150.400 – cyclic nucleotide phosphodiesterases, type 4
- MeSH D08.811.277.352.640.150.500 – cyclic nucleotide phosphodiesterases, type 5
- MeSH D08.811.277.352.640.150.600 – cyclic nucleotide phosphodiesterases, type 6
- MeSH D08.811.277.352.640.150.700 – cyclic nucleotide phosphodiesterases, type 7
- MeSH D08.811.277.352.640.155 – 3',5'-cyclic-gmp phosphodiesterases
- MeSH D08.811.277.352.640.155.100 – cyclic nucleotide phosphodiesterases, type 1
- MeSH D08.811.277.352.640.155.200 – cyclic nucleotide phosphodiesterases, type 2
- MeSH D08.811.277.352.640.155.500 – cyclic nucleotide phosphodiesterases, type 5
- MeSH D08.811.277.352.640.155.750 – cyclic nucleotide phosphodiesterases, type 6
- MeSH D08.811.277.352.640.160 – 2',3'-cyclic-nucleotide phosphodiesterases
- MeSH D08.811.277.352.640.160.500 – 2',3'-cyclic nucleotide 3'-phosphodiesterase
- MeSH D08.811.277.352.640.295 – glycerophosphoinositol inositolphosphodiesterase
- MeSH D08.811.277.352.640.430 – phosphodiesterase i
- MeSH D08.811.277.352.640.700 – phospholipases
- MeSH D08.811.277.352.640.700.700 – type c phospholipases
- MeSH D08.811.277.352.640.700.700.249 – glycosylphosphatidylinositol diacylglycerol-lyase
- MeSH D08.811.277.352.640.700.700.500 – phosphatidylinositol diacylglycerol-lyase
- MeSH D08.811.277.352.640.700.700.562 – phosphoinositide phospholipase c
- MeSH D08.811.277.352.640.700.700.562.500 – phospholipase c beta
- MeSH D08.811.277.352.640.700.700.562.625 – phospholipase c delta
- MeSH D08.811.277.352.640.700.700.562.750 – phospholipase c gamma
- MeSH D08.811.277.352.640.700.710 – phospholipase d
- MeSH D08.811.277.352.640.750 – sphingomyelin phosphodiesterase
- MeSH D08.811.277.352.650 – phosphoric monoester hydrolases
- MeSH D08.811.277.352.650.025 – acid phosphatase
- MeSH D08.811.277.352.650.025.500 – tartrate-resistant acid phosphatase
- MeSH D08.811.277.352.650.030 – adp-ribose 1''-phosphate phosphatases
- MeSH D08.811.277.352.650.035 – alkaline phosphatase
- MeSH D08.811.277.352.650.200 – fructose-bisphosphatase
- MeSH D08.811.277.352.650.225 – glucose-6-phosphatase
- MeSH D08.811.277.352.650.300 – histidinol-phosphatase
- MeSH D08.811.277.352.650.575 – 4-nitrophenylphosphatase
- MeSH D08.811.277.352.650.587 – mitogen-activated protein kinase phosphatases
- MeSH D08.811.277.352.650.587.200 – dual specificity phosphatase 1
- MeSH D08.811.277.352.650.587.250 – dual specificity phosphatase 2
- MeSH D08.811.277.352.650.587.300 – dual specificity phosphatase 3
- MeSH D08.811.277.352.650.587.600 – dual specificity phosphatase 6
- MeSH D08.811.277.352.650.600 – nucleotidases
- MeSH D08.811.277.352.650.600.600 – 5'-nucleotidase
- MeSH D08.811.277.352.650.600.800 – mrna guanylyltransferases
- MeSH D08.811.277.352.650.620 – phosphatidate phosphatase
- MeSH D08.811.277.352.650.622 – phosphofructokinase-2
- MeSH D08.811.277.352.650.623 – phosphoinositide 5-phosphatases
- MeSH D08.811.277.352.650.624 – phosphoinositide phosphatases
- MeSH D08.811.277.352.650.624.500 – inositol polyphosphate 5-phosphatases
- MeSH D08.811.277.352.650.624.750 – phosphatidylinositol-3,4,5-trisphosphate 5-phosphatases
- MeSH D08.811.277.352.650.625 – phosphoprotein phosphatases
- MeSH D08.811.277.352.650.625.150 – calcineurin
- MeSH D08.811.277.352.650.625.225 – dual-specificity phosphatases
- MeSH D08.811.277.352.650.625.225.100 – cdc25 phosphatases
- MeSH D08.811.277.352.650.625.225.200 – dual specificity phosphatase 1
- MeSH D08.811.277.352.650.625.225.250 – dual specificity phosphatase 2
- MeSH D08.811.277.352.650.625.225.300 – dual specificity phosphatase 3
- MeSH D08.811.277.352.650.625.225.600 – dual specificity phosphatase 6
- MeSH D08.811.277.352.650.625.300 – glycogen-synthase-d phosphatase
- MeSH D08.811.277.352.650.625.475 – myosin-light-chain phosphatase
- MeSH D08.811.277.352.650.625.650 – phosphorylase phosphatase
- MeSH D08.811.277.352.650.625.687 – protein phosphatase 1
- MeSH D08.811.277.352.650.625.706 – protein phosphatase 2
- MeSH D08.811.277.352.650.625.716 – protein phosphatase 2c
- MeSH D08.811.277.352.650.625.725 – pyruvate dehydrogenase (lipoamide)-phosphatase
- MeSH D08.811.277.352.650.625.862 – tartrate-resistant acid phosphatase
- MeSH D08.811.277.352.650.700 – 6-phytase
- MeSH D08.811.277.352.650.775 – protein tyrosine phosphatases
- MeSH D08.811.277.352.650.775.250 – dual-specificity phosphatases
- MeSH D08.811.277.352.650.775.250.100 – cdc25 phosphatases
- MeSH D08.811.277.352.650.775.250.200 – dual specificity phosphatase 1
- MeSH D08.811.277.352.650.775.250.250 – dual specificity phosphatase 2
- MeSH D08.811.277.352.650.775.250.300 – dual specificity phosphatase 3
- MeSH D08.811.277.352.650.775.250.600 – dual specificity phosphatase 6
- MeSH D08.811.277.352.650.775.300 – protein tyrosine phosphatases, non-receptor
- MeSH D08.811.277.352.650.775.300.100 – protein tyrosine phosphatase, non-receptor type 1
- MeSH D08.811.277.352.650.775.300.200 – protein tyrosine phosphatase, non-receptor type 2
- MeSH D08.811.277.352.650.775.300.300 – protein tyrosine phosphatase, non-receptor type 3
- MeSH D08.811.277.352.650.775.300.400 – protein tyrosine phosphatase, non-receptor type 4
- MeSH D08.811.277.352.650.775.300.600 – protein tyrosine phosphatase, non-receptor type 6
- MeSH D08.811.277.352.650.775.300.800 – protein tyrosine phosphatase, non-receptor type 11
- MeSH D08.811.277.352.650.775.300.850 – protein tyrosine phosphatase, non-receptor type 12
- MeSH D08.811.277.352.650.775.300.860 – protein tyrosine phosphatase, non-receptor type 13
- MeSH D08.811.277.352.650.775.300.930 – protein tyrosine phosphatase, non-receptor type 22
- MeSH D08.811.277.352.650.775.400 – receptor-like protein tyrosine phosphatases
- MeSH D08.811.277.352.650.775.400.100 – receptor-like protein tyrosine phosphatases, class 1
- MeSH D08.811.277.352.650.775.400.100.500 – leukocyte common antigens
- MeSH D08.811.277.352.650.775.400.200 – receptor-like protein tyrosine phosphatases, class 2
- MeSH D08.811.277.352.650.775.400.300 – receptor-like protein tyrosine phosphatases, class 3
- MeSH D08.811.277.352.650.775.400.400 – receptor-like protein tyrosine phosphatases, class 4
- MeSH D08.811.277.352.650.775.400.500 – receptor-like protein tyrosine phosphatases, class 5
- MeSH D08.811.277.352.650.775.400.700 – receptor-like protein tyrosine phosphatases, class 7
- MeSH D08.811.277.352.650.775.400.800 – receptor-like protein tyrosine phosphatases, class 8
- MeSH D08.811.277.352.650.775.700 – sh2 domain-containing protein tyrosine phosphatases
- MeSH D08.811.277.352.650.775.700.200 – protein tyrosine phosphatase, non-receptor type 6
- MeSH D08.811.277.352.650.775.700.800 – protein tyrosine phosphatase, non-receptor type 11
- MeSH D08.811.277.352.650.850 – pten phosphohydrolase
- MeSH D08.811.277.352.660 – phosphoric triester hydrolases
- MeSH D08.811.277.352.660.500 – aryldialkylphosphatase
- MeSH D08.811.277.352.700 – ribonucleases
- MeSH D08.811.277.352.700.350 – endoribonucleases
- MeSH D08.811.277.352.700.350.262 – eosinophil cationic protein
- MeSH D08.811.277.352.700.350.381 – eosinophil-derived neurotoxin
- MeSH D08.811.277.352.700.350.500 – micrococcal nuclease
- MeSH D08.811.277.352.700.350.700 – ribonuclease h
- MeSH D08.811.277.352.700.350.700.500 – ribonuclease h, human immunodeficiency virus
- MeSH D08.811.277.352.700.350.707 – ribonuclease iii
- MeSH D08.811.277.352.700.350.711 – ribonuclease p
- MeSH D08.811.277.352.700.350.715 – ribonuclease, pancreatic
- MeSH D08.811.277.352.700.350.725 – ribonuclease t1
- MeSH D08.811.277.352.700.350.810 – rna-induced silencing complex
- MeSH D08.811.277.352.700.350.810.500 – argonaute proteins
- MeSH D08.811.277.352.700.350.850 – single-strand specific dna and rna endonucleases
- MeSH D08.811.277.352.700.350.850.500 – uridylate-specific endoribonucleases
- MeSH D08.811.277.352.700.375 – exoribonucleases
- MeSH D08.811.277.352.700.687 – exosome multienzyme ribonuclease complex
- MeSH D08.811.277.352.700.843 – sam domain and hd domain-containing protein 1
- MeSH D08.811.277.352.827 – sulfatases
- MeSH D08.811.277.352.827.070 – arylsulfatases
- MeSH D08.811.277.352.827.070.060 – n-acetylgalactosamine-4-sulfatase
- MeSH D08.811.277.352.827.070.250 – cerebroside-sulfatase
- MeSH D08.811.277.352.827.070.625 – steryl-sulfatase
- MeSH D08.811.277.352.827.180 – chondroitinases and chondroitin lyases
- MeSH D08.811.277.352.827.180.175 – chondroitinsulfatases
- MeSH D08.811.277.352.827.180.175.060 – n-acetylgalactosamine-4-sulfatase
- MeSH D08.811.277.352.827.180.175.275 – chondro-4-sulfatase
- MeSH D08.811.277.352.827.500 – iduronate sulfatase
- MeSH D08.811.277.352.897 – thiolester hydrolases
- MeSH D08.811.277.352.897.075 – acetyl-coa hydrolase
- MeSH D08.811.277.352.897.387 – fatty acid synthases
- MeSH D08.811.277.352.897.387.100 – fatty acid synthase, type i
- MeSH D08.811.277.352.897.387.200 – fatty acid synthase, type ii
- MeSH D08.811.277.352.897.544 – hydroxyacylglutathione hydrolase
- MeSH D08.811.277.352.897.700 – palmitoyl-coa hydrolase
- MeSH D08.811.277.352.897.850 – ubiquitin thiolesterase
- MeSH D08.811.277.450 – glycoside hydrolases
- MeSH D08.811.277.450.050 – alpha-l-fucosidase
- MeSH D08.811.277.450.066 – amylases
- MeSH D08.811.277.450.066.050 – alpha-amylases
- MeSH D08.811.277.450.066.050.249 – pancreatic alpha-amylases
- MeSH D08.811.277.450.066.050.500 – salivary alpha-amylases
- MeSH D08.811.277.450.066.100 – beta-amylase
- MeSH D08.811.277.450.114 – beta-fructofuranosidase
- MeSH D08.811.277.450.207 – chitinases
- MeSH D08.811.277.450.207.500 – chitinase-3-like protein 1
- MeSH D08.811.277.450.283 – dextranase
- MeSH D08.811.277.450.329 – disaccharidases
- MeSH D08.811.277.450.329.738 – sucrase
- MeSH D08.811.277.450.329.738.700 – sucrase-isomaltase complex
- MeSH D08.811.277.450.329.865 – trehalase
- MeSH D08.811.277.450.410 – galactosidases
- MeSH D08.811.277.450.410.050 – alpha-galactosidase
- MeSH D08.811.277.450.410.100 – beta-galactosidase
- MeSH D08.811.277.450.410.100.500 – lactase
- MeSH D08.811.277.450.410.100.500.500 – lactase-phlorizin hydrolase
- MeSH D08.811.277.450.410.120 – galactosylceramidase
- MeSH D08.811.277.450.410.150 – galactosylgalactosylglucosylceramidase
- MeSH D08.811.277.450.420 – glucosidases
- MeSH D08.811.277.450.420.050 – alpha-glucosidases
- MeSH D08.811.277.450.420.200 – cellulases
- MeSH D08.811.277.450.420.200.100 – beta-glucosidase
- MeSH D08.811.277.450.420.200.200 – cellulase
- MeSH D08.811.277.450.420.200.400 – cellulose 1,4-beta-cellobiosidase
- MeSH D08.811.277.450.420.200.450 – endo-1,3(4)-beta-glucanase
- MeSH D08.811.277.450.420.200.500 – glucan 1,3-beta-glucosidase
- MeSH D08.811.277.450.420.200.550 – glucan 1,4-beta-glucosidase
- MeSH D08.811.277.450.420.200.600 – glucan endo-1,3-beta-d-glucosidase
- MeSH D08.811.277.450.420.375 – glucan 1,4-alpha-glucosidase
- MeSH D08.811.277.450.420.412 – glucosylceramidase
- MeSH D08.811.277.450.420.450 – glycogen debranching enzyme system
- MeSH D08.811.277.450.420.475 – lactase-phlorizin hydrolase
- MeSH D08.811.277.450.426 – glucuronidase
- MeSH D08.811.277.450.426.001 – heparanase
- MeSH D08.811.277.450.426.500 – klotho proteins
- MeSH D08.811.277.450.430 – n-glycosyl hydrolases
- MeSH D08.811.277.450.430.099 – dna glycosylases
- MeSH D08.811.277.450.430.099.500 – dna-formamidopyrimidine glycosylase
- MeSH D08.811.277.450.430.099.750 – thymine dna glycosylase
- MeSH D08.811.277.450.430.400 – nad nucleosidase
- MeSH D08.811.277.450.430.400.060 – adp-ribosyl cyclase
- MeSH D08.811.277.450.430.400.060.500 – adp-ribosyl cyclase 1
- MeSH D08.811.277.450.430.700 – ribosome inactivating proteins
- MeSH D08.811.277.450.430.700.500 – ribosome inactivating proteins, type 1
- MeSH D08.811.277.450.430.700.500.500 – saporins
- MeSH D08.811.277.450.430.700.750 – ribosome inactivating proteins, type 2
- MeSH D08.811.277.450.430.700.750.111 – abrin
- MeSH D08.811.277.450.430.700.750.666 – ricin
- MeSH D08.811.277.450.430.700.750.750 – shiga toxins
- MeSH D08.811.277.450.430.700.750.750.100 – shiga toxin
- MeSH D08.811.277.450.430.700.750.750.120 – shiga toxin 1
- MeSH D08.811.277.450.430.700.750.750.124 – shiga toxin 2
- MeSH D08.811.277.450.483 – hexosaminidases
- MeSH D08.811.277.450.483.044 – alpha-n-acetylgalactosaminidase
- MeSH D08.811.277.450.483.112 – beta-n-acetyl-galactosaminidase
- MeSH D08.811.277.450.483.180 – beta-n-acetylhexosaminidases
- MeSH D08.811.277.450.483.180.500 – acetylglucosaminidase
- MeSH D08.811.277.450.483.180.750 – hexosaminidase a
- MeSH D08.811.277.450.483.180.750.500 – beta-hexosaminidase alpha chain
- MeSH D08.811.277.450.483.180.750.750 – beta-hexosaminidase beta chain
- MeSH D08.811.277.450.483.180.875 – hexosaminidase b
- MeSH D08.811.277.450.483.180.875.500 – beta-hexosaminidase beta chain
- MeSH D08.811.277.450.483.765 – mannosyl-glycoprotein endo-beta-n-acetylglucosaminidase
- MeSH D08.811.277.450.529 – hyaluronoglucosaminidase
- MeSH D08.811.277.450.560 – iduronidase
- MeSH D08.811.277.450.585 – isoamylase
- MeSH D08.811.277.450.625 – mannosidases
- MeSH D08.811.277.450.625.500 – alpha-mannosidase
- MeSH D08.811.277.450.625.750 – beta-mannosidase
- MeSH D08.811.277.450.642 – muramidase
- MeSH D08.811.277.450.692 – neuraminidase
- MeSH D08.811.277.450.770 – oligo-1,6-glucosidase
- MeSH D08.811.277.450.770.800 – sucrase-isomaltase complex
- MeSH D08.811.277.450.800 – polygalacturonase
- MeSH D08.811.277.450.950 – xylosidases
- MeSH D08.811.277.450.950.249 – endo-1,4-beta xylanases
- MeSH D08.811.277.450.950.500 – xylan endo-1,3-beta-xylosidase
- MeSH D08.811.277.610 – pancreatin
- MeSH D08.811.277.656 – peptide hydrolases
- MeSH D08.811.277.656.074 – aspartic acid proteases
- MeSH D08.811.277.656.074.500 – aspartic acid endopeptidases
- MeSH D08.811.277.656.074.500.180 – cathepsin d
- MeSH D08.811.277.656.074.500.185 – cathepsin e
- MeSH D08.811.277.656.074.500.200 – chymosin
- MeSH D08.811.277.656.074.500.270 – endothelin-converting enzymes
- MeSH D08.811.277.656.074.500.340 – hiv protease
- MeSH D08.811.277.656.074.500.700 – pepsin a
- MeSH D08.811.277.656.074.500.780 – renin
- MeSH D08.811.277.656.074.500.890 – secreted aspartic proteases
- MeSH D08.811.277.656.149 – atp-dependent proteases
- MeSH D08.811.277.656.149.099 – atp-dependent endopeptidases
- MeSH D08.811.277.656.149.099.500 – endopeptidase clp
- MeSH D08.811.277.656.149.099.750 – protease la
- MeSH D08.811.277.656.224 – cathepsins
- MeSH D08.811.277.656.224.062 – cathepsin a
- MeSH D08.811.277.656.224.125 – cathepsin b
- MeSH D08.811.277.656.224.130 – cathepsin c
- MeSH D08.811.277.656.224.187 – cathepsin d
- MeSH D08.811.277.656.224.250 – cathepsin e
- MeSH D08.811.277.656.224.300 – cathepsin f
- MeSH D08.811.277.656.224.350 – cathepsin g
- MeSH D08.811.277.656.224.400 – cathepsin h
- MeSH D08.811.277.656.224.405 – cathepsin k
- MeSH D08.811.277.656.224.407 – cathepsin l
- MeSH D08.811.277.656.224.417 – cathepsin w
- MeSH D08.811.277.656.224.425 – cathepsin z
- MeSH D08.811.277.656.262 – cysteine proteases
- MeSH D08.811.277.656.262.186 – cathepsin c
- MeSH D08.811.277.656.262.249 – cathepsin z
- MeSH D08.811.277.656.262.500 – cysteine endopeptidases
- MeSH D08.811.277.656.262.500.096 – bromelains
- MeSH D08.811.277.656.262.500.102 – asparaginyl endopeptidase
- MeSH D08.811.277.656.262.500.108 – 3c viral proteases
- MeSH D08.811.277.656.262.500.108.500 – coronavirus 3c proteases
- MeSH D08.811.277.656.262.500.120 – calpain
- MeSH D08.811.277.656.262.500.126 – caspases
- MeSH D08.811.277.656.262.500.126.350 – caspases, effector
- MeSH D08.811.277.656.262.500.126.350.300 – caspase 3
- MeSH D08.811.277.656.262.500.126.350.600 – caspase 6
- MeSH D08.811.277.656.262.500.126.350.700 – caspase 7
- MeSH D08.811.277.656.262.500.126.350.900 – caspase 14
- MeSH D08.811.277.656.262.500.126.550 – caspases, initiator
- MeSH D08.811.277.656.262.500.126.550.100 – caspase 1
- MeSH D08.811.277.656.262.500.126.550.200 – caspase 2
- MeSH D08.811.277.656.262.500.126.550.800 – caspase 8
- MeSH D08.811.277.656.262.500.126.550.900 – caspase 9
- MeSH D08.811.277.656.262.500.126.550.910 – caspase 10
- MeSH D08.811.277.656.262.500.126.550.920 – caspase 12
- MeSH D08.811.277.656.262.500.126.775 – mucosa-associated lymphoid tissue lymphoma translocation 1 protein
- MeSH D08.811.277.656.262.500.133 – cathepsin b
- MeSH D08.811.277.656.262.500.146 – cathepsin f
- MeSH D08.811.277.656.262.500.153 – cathepsin h
- MeSH D08.811.277.656.262.500.156 – cathepsin k
- MeSH D08.811.277.656.262.500.157 – cathepsin l
- MeSH D08.811.277.656.262.500.158 – cathepsin w
- MeSH D08.811.277.656.262.500.160 – chymopapain
- MeSH D08.811.277.656.262.500.350 – ficain
- MeSH D08.811.277.656.262.500.468 – gingipain cysteine endopeptidases
- MeSH D08.811.277.656.262.500.585 – papain
- MeSH D08.811.277.656.262.500.792 – separase
- MeSH D08.811.277.656.262.500.896 – viral papain-like proteases
- MeSH D08.811.277.656.262.500.896.500 – coronavirus papain-like proteases
- MeSH D08.811.277.656.300 – endopeptidases
- MeSH D08.811.277.656.300.032 – amyloid precursor protein secretases
- MeSH D08.811.277.656.300.048 – aspartic acid endopeptidases
- MeSH D08.811.277.656.300.048.180 – cathepsin d
- MeSH D08.811.277.656.300.048.185 – cathepsin e
- MeSH D08.811.277.656.300.048.200 – chymosin
- MeSH D08.811.277.656.300.048.270 – endothelin-converting enzymes
- MeSH D08.811.277.656.300.048.340 – hiv protease
- MeSH D08.811.277.656.300.048.700 – pepsin a
- MeSH D08.811.277.656.300.048.780 – renin
- MeSH D08.811.277.656.300.065 – atp-dependent endopeptidases
- MeSH D08.811.277.656.300.065.500 – endopeptidase clp
- MeSH D08.811.277.656.300.065.750 – protease la
- MeSH D08.811.277.656.300.099 – brinolase
- MeSH D08.811.277.656.300.174 – coagulase
- MeSH D08.811.277.656.300.200 – cysteine endopeptidases
- MeSH D08.811.277.656.300.200.001 – asparaginyl endopeptidase
- MeSH D08.811.277.656.300.200.096 – bromelains
- MeSH D08.811.277.656.300.200.120 – calpain
- MeSH D08.811.277.656.300.200.126 – caspases
- MeSH D08.811.277.656.300.200.126.350 – caspases, effector
- MeSH D08.811.277.656.300.200.126.350.300 – caspase 3
- MeSH D08.811.277.656.300.200.126.350.600 – caspase 6
- MeSH D08.811.277.656.300.200.126.350.700 – caspase 7
- MeSH D08.811.277.656.300.200.126.350.900 – caspase 14
- MeSH D08.811.277.656.300.200.126.550 – caspases, initiator
- MeSH D08.811.277.656.300.200.126.550.100 – caspase 1
- MeSH D08.811.277.656.300.200.126.550.200 – caspase 2
- MeSH D08.811.277.656.300.200.126.550.800 – caspase 8
- MeSH D08.811.277.656.300.200.126.550.900 – caspase 9
- MeSH D08.811.277.656.300.200.126.550.910 – caspase 10
- MeSH D08.811.277.656.300.200.126.550.920 – caspase 12
- MeSH D08.811.277.656.300.200.126.775 – mucosa-associated lymphoid tissue lymphoma translocation 1 protein
- MeSH D08.811.277.656.300.200.133 – cathepsin b
- MeSH D08.811.277.656.300.200.146 – cathepsin f
- MeSH D08.811.277.656.300.200.153 – cathepsin h
- MeSH D08.811.277.656.300.200.156 – cathepsin k
- MeSH D08.811.277.656.300.200.157 – cathepsin l
- MeSH D08.811.277.656.300.200.158 – cathepsin w
- MeSH D08.811.277.656.300.200.160 – chymopapain
- MeSH D08.811.277.656.300.200.350 – ficain
- MeSH D08.811.277.656.300.200.585 – papain
- MeSH D08.811.277.656.300.200.792 – separase
- MeSH D08.811.277.656.300.340 – fibroblast activation protein alpha
- MeSH D08.811.277.656.300.480 – metalloendopeptidases
- MeSH D08.811.277.656.300.480.153 – botulinum toxins
- MeSH D08.811.277.656.300.480.153.100 – botulinum toxins, type a
- MeSH D08.811.277.656.300.480.205 – collagenases
- MeSH D08.811.277.656.300.480.205.351 – matrix metalloproteinase 1
- MeSH D08.811.277.656.300.480.205.352 – matrix metalloproteinase 2
- MeSH D08.811.277.656.300.480.205.358 – matrix metalloproteinase 8
- MeSH D08.811.277.656.300.480.205.360 – matrix metalloproteinase 9
- MeSH D08.811.277.656.300.480.205.363 – matrix metalloproteinase 13
- MeSH D08.811.277.656.300.480.205.500 – microbial collagenase
- MeSH D08.811.277.656.300.480.229 – endothelin-converting enzymes
- MeSH D08.811.277.656.300.480.252 – gelatinases
- MeSH D08.811.277.656.300.480.252.420 – matrix metalloproteinase 2
- MeSH D08.811.277.656.300.480.252.445 – matrix metalloproteinase 9
- MeSH D08.811.277.656.300.480.300 – insulysin
- MeSH D08.811.277.656.300.480.452 – lysostaphin
- MeSH D08.811.277.656.300.480.525 – matrix metalloproteinases
- MeSH D08.811.277.656.300.480.525.300 – matrix metalloproteinases, membrane-associated
- MeSH D08.811.277.656.300.480.525.300.500 – matrix metalloproteinase 14
- MeSH D08.811.277.656.300.480.525.300.550 – matrix metalloproteinase 15
- MeSH D08.811.277.656.300.480.525.300.600 – matrix metalloproteinase 16
- MeSH D08.811.277.656.300.480.525.300.650 – matrix metalloproteinase 17
- MeSH D08.811.277.656.300.480.525.300.500 – matrix metalloproteinase 14
- MeSH D08.811.277.656.300.480.525.300.550 – matrix metalloproteinase 15
- MeSH D08.811.277.656.300.480.525.300.600 – matrix metalloproteinase 16
- MeSH D08.811.277.656.300.480.525.300.650 – matrix metalloproteinase 17
- MeSH D08.811.277.656.300.480.525.700 – matrix metalloproteinases, secreted
- MeSH D08.811.277.656.300.480.525.700.049 – bone morphogenetic protein 1
- MeSH D08.811.277.656.300.480.525.700.100 – matrix metalloproteinase 1
- MeSH D08.811.277.656.300.480.525.700.150 – matrix metalloproteinase 2
- MeSH D08.811.277.656.300.480.525.700.200 – matrix metalloproteinase 3
- MeSH D08.811.277.656.300.480.525.700.250 – matrix metalloproteinase 7
- MeSH D08.811.277.656.300.480.525.700.300 – matrix metalloproteinase 8
- MeSH D08.811.277.656.300.480.525.700.350 – matrix metalloproteinase 9
- MeSH D08.811.277.656.300.480.525.700.400 – matrix metalloproteinase 10
- MeSH D08.811.277.656.300.480.525.700.450 – matrix metalloproteinase 11
- MeSH D08.811.277.656.300.480.525.700.500 – matrix metalloproteinase 12
- MeSH D08.811.277.656.300.480.525.700.550 – matrix metalloproteinase 13
- MeSH D08.811.277.656.300.480.525.700.800 – matrix metalloproteinase 20
- MeSH D08.811.277.656.300.480.525.700.049 – bone morphogenetic protein 1
- MeSH D08.811.277.656.300.480.525.700.100 – matrix metalloproteinase 1
- MeSH D08.811.277.656.300.480.525.700.150 – matrix metalloproteinase 2
- MeSH D08.811.277.656.300.480.525.700.200 – matrix metalloproteinase 3
- MeSH D08.811.277.656.300.480.525.700.250 – matrix metalloproteinase 7
- MeSH D08.811.277.656.300.480.525.700.300 – matrix metalloproteinase 8
- MeSH D08.811.277.656.300.480.525.700.350 – matrix metalloproteinase 9
- MeSH D08.811.277.656.300.480.525.700.400 – matrix metalloproteinase 10
- MeSH D08.811.277.656.300.480.525.700.450 – matrix metalloproteinase 11
- MeSH D08.811.277.656.300.480.525.700.500 – matrix metalloproteinase 12
- MeSH D08.811.277.656.300.480.525.700.550 – matrix metalloproteinase 13
- MeSH D08.811.277.656.300.480.525.700.800 – matrix metalloproteinase 20
- MeSH D08.811.277.656.300.480.563 – mitochondrial processing peptidase
- MeSH D08.811.277.656.300.480.600 – neprilysin
- MeSH D08.811.277.656.300.480.616 – phex phosphate regulating neutral endopeptidase
- MeSH D08.811.277.656.300.480.632 – pregnancy-associated plasma protein-a
- MeSH D08.811.277.656.300.480.664 – procollagen n-endopeptidase
- MeSH D08.811.277.656.300.480.680 – pronase
- MeSH D08.811.277.656.300.480.827 – thermolysin
- MeSH D08.811.277.656.300.760 – serine endopeptidases
- MeSH D08.811.277.656.300.760.030 – acrosin
- MeSH D08.811.277.656.300.760.066 – cathepsin g
- MeSH D08.811.277.656.300.760.103 – chymases
- MeSH D08.811.277.656.300.760.176 – chymotrypsin
- MeSH D08.811.277.656.300.760.198 – complement factor b
- MeSH D08.811.277.656.300.760.200 – complement factor d
- MeSH D08.811.277.656.300.760.210 – complement factor i
- MeSH D08.811.277.656.300.760.247 – endopeptidase k
- MeSH D08.811.277.656.300.760.284 – enteropeptidase
- MeSH D08.811.277.656.300.760.300 – factor viia
- MeSH D08.811.277.656.300.760.310 – factor ixa
- MeSH D08.811.277.656.300.760.315 – factor xa
- MeSH D08.811.277.656.300.760.320 – factor xia
- MeSH D08.811.277.656.300.760.324 – factor xiia
- MeSH D08.811.277.656.300.760.330 – fibrinolysin
- MeSH D08.811.277.656.300.760.353 – furin
- MeSH D08.811.277.656.300.760.397 – granzymes
- MeSH D08.811.277.656.300.760.420 – high-temperature requirement a serine peptidase 1
- MeSH D08.811.277.656.300.760.431 – high-temperature requirement a serine peptidase 2
- MeSH D08.811.277.656.300.760.442 – kallikreins
- MeSH D08.811.277.656.300.760.442.700 – plasma kallikrein
- MeSH D08.811.277.656.300.760.442.725 – prekallikrein
- MeSH D08.811.277.656.300.760.442.750 – prostate-specific antigen
- MeSH D08.811.277.656.300.760.442.875 – tissue kallikreins
- MeSH D08.811.277.656.300.760.471 – lactoferrin
- MeSH D08.811.277.656.300.760.486 – lexa repressor protein
- MeSH D08.811.277.656.300.760.501 – mannose-binding protein-associated serine proteases
- MeSH D08.811.277.656.300.760.530 – myeloblastin
- MeSH D08.811.277.656.300.760.560 – pancreatic elastase
- MeSH D08.811.277.656.300.760.560.500 – leukocyte elastase
- MeSH D08.811.277.656.300.760.635 – plasminogen activators
- MeSH D08.811.277.656.300.760.635.075 – anistreplase
- MeSH D08.811.277.656.300.760.637 – prolyl oligopeptidases
- MeSH D08.811.277.656.300.760.638 – pronase
- MeSH D08.811.277.656.300.760.640 – proprotein convertase 1
- MeSH D08.811.277.656.300.760.646 – proprotein convertase 2
- MeSH D08.811.277.656.300.760.648 – proprotein convertase 5
- MeSH D08.811.277.656.300.760.718 – proprotein convertase 9
- MeSH D08.811.277.656.300.760.736 – prostasin
- MeSH D08.811.277.656.300.760.753 – reelin protein
- MeSH D08.811.277.656.300.760.787 – subtilisins
- MeSH D08.811.277.656.300.760.787.805 – subtilisin
- MeSH D08.811.277.656.300.760.855 – thrombin
- MeSH D08.811.277.656.300.760.875 – tissue plasminogen activator
- MeSH D08.811.277.656.300.760.875.500 – tenecteplase
- MeSH D08.811.277.656.300.760.895 – trypsin
- MeSH D08.811.277.656.300.760.902 – tryptases
- MeSH D08.811.277.656.300.760.910 – urokinase-type plasminogen activator
- MeSH D08.811.277.656.300.760.955 – venombin a
- MeSH D08.811.277.656.300.760.955.060 – ancrod
- MeSH D08.811.277.656.300.760.955.135 – batroxobin
- MeSH D08.811.277.656.300.775 – streptokinase
- MeSH D08.811.277.656.300.775.075 – anistreplase
- MeSH D08.811.277.656.300.775.900 – streptodornase and streptokinase
- MeSH D08.811.277.656.300.887 – ubiquitin-specific proteases
- MeSH D08.811.277.656.300.887.375 – cop9 signalosome complex
- MeSH D08.811.277.656.300.887.750 – tumor necrosis factor alpha-induced protein 3
- MeSH D08.811.277.656.300.887.875 – ubiquitin-specific peptidase 7
- MeSH D08.811.277.656.350 – exopeptidases
- MeSH D08.811.277.656.350.100 – aminopeptidases
- MeSH D08.811.277.656.350.100.160 – cd13 antigens
- MeSH D08.811.277.656.350.100.235 – cystinyl aminopeptidase
- MeSH D08.811.277.656.350.100.373 – glutamyl aminopeptidase
- MeSH D08.811.277.656.350.100.511 – leucyl aminopeptidase
- MeSH D08.811.277.656.350.100.633 – methionyl aminopeptidases
- MeSH D08.811.277.656.350.100.755 – pyroglutamyl-peptidase i
- MeSH D08.811.277.656.350.100.877 – tripeptidyl-peptidase 1
- MeSH D08.811.277.656.350.245 – carboxypeptidases
- MeSH D08.811.277.656.350.245.042 – angiotensin-converting enzyme 2
- MeSH D08.811.277.656.350.245.083 – carboxypeptidase b
- MeSH D08.811.277.656.350.245.125 – carboxypeptidase b2
- MeSH D08.811.277.656.350.245.167 – carboxypeptidase h
- MeSH D08.811.277.656.350.245.250 – carboxypeptidases a
- MeSH D08.811.277.656.350.245.260 – cathepsin a
- MeSH D08.811.277.656.350.245.270 – cathepsin z
- MeSH D08.811.277.656.350.245.280 – gamma-glutamyl hydrolase
- MeSH D08.811.277.656.350.245.400 – glutamate carboxypeptidase ii
- MeSH D08.811.277.656.350.245.450 – lysine carboxypeptidase
- MeSH D08.811.277.656.350.245.500 – muramoylpentapeptide carboxypeptidase
- MeSH D08.811.277.656.350.245.800 – serine-type d-ala-d-ala carboxypeptidase
- MeSH D08.811.277.656.350.297 – dipeptidases
- MeSH D08.811.277.656.350.350 – dipeptidyl-peptidases and tripeptidyl-peptidases
- MeSH D08.811.277.656.350.350.100 – cathepsin c
- MeSH D08.811.277.656.350.350.126 – dipeptidyl peptidase 4
- MeSH D08.811.277.656.350.350.687 – peptidyl-dipeptidase a
- MeSH D08.811.277.656.350.350.843 – tripeptidyl-peptidase 1
- MeSH D08.811.277.656.350.555 – metalloexopeptidases
- MeSH D08.811.277.656.350.555.100 – cd13 antigens
- MeSH D08.811.277.656.350.555.200 – carboxypeptidase b
- MeSH D08.811.277.656.350.555.225 – carboxypeptidase b2
- MeSH D08.811.277.656.350.555.250 – carboxypeptidase h
- MeSH D08.811.277.656.350.555.350 – carboxypeptidases a
- MeSH D08.811.277.656.350.555.400 – cystinyl aminopeptidase
- MeSH D08.811.277.656.350.555.500 – glutamate carboxypeptidase ii
- MeSH D08.811.277.656.350.555.600 – glutamyl aminopeptidase
- MeSH D08.811.277.656.350.555.700 – leucyl aminopeptidase
- MeSH D08.811.277.656.350.555.750 – lysine carboxypeptidase
- MeSH D08.811.277.656.675 – metalloproteases
- MeSH D08.811.277.656.675.374 – metalloendopeptidases
- MeSH D08.811.277.656.675.374.102 – adam proteins
- MeSH D08.811.277.656.675.374.102.125 – adam12 protein
- MeSH D08.811.277.656.675.374.102.250 – adam10 protein
- MeSH D08.811.277.656.675.374.102.375 – adam17 protein
- MeSH D08.811.277.656.675.374.102.500 – adamts proteins
- MeSH D08.811.277.656.675.374.102.500.500 – adamts1 protein
- MeSH D08.811.277.656.675.374.102.500.813 – adamts13 protein
- MeSH D08.811.277.656.675.374.102.500.844 – adamts4 protein
- MeSH D08.811.277.656.675.374.102.500.875 – adamts5 protein
- MeSH D08.811.277.656.675.374.102.500.937 – adamts7 protein
- MeSH D08.811.277.656.675.374.102.500.968 – adamts9 protein
- MeSH D08.811.277.656.675.374.102.500.500 – adamts1 protein
- MeSH D08.811.277.656.675.374.102.500.813 – adamts13 protein
- MeSH D08.811.277.656.675.374.102.500.844 – adamts4 protein
- MeSH D08.811.277.656.675.374.102.500.875 – adamts5 protein
- MeSH D08.811.277.656.675.374.102.500.937 – adamts7 protein
- MeSH D08.811.277.656.675.374.102.500.968 – adamts9 protein
- MeSH D08.811.277.656.675.374.102.750 – fertilins
- MeSH D08.811.277.656.675.374.153 – botulinum toxins
- MeSH D08.811.277.656.675.374.153.100 – botulinum toxins, type a
- MeSH D08.811.277.656.675.374.205 – collagenases
- MeSH D08.811.277.656.675.374.205.351 – matrix metalloproteinase 1
- MeSH D08.811.277.656.675.374.205.352 – matrix metalloproteinase 2
- MeSH D08.811.277.656.675.374.205.358 – matrix metalloproteinase 8
- MeSH D08.811.277.656.675.374.205.360 – matrix metalloproteinase 9
- MeSH D08.811.277.656.675.374.205.363 – matrix metalloproteinase 13
- MeSH D08.811.277.656.675.374.205.500 – microbial collagenase
- MeSH D08.811.277.656.675.374.229 – endothelin-converting enzymes
- MeSH D08.811.277.656.675.374.252 – gelatinases
- MeSH D08.811.277.656.675.374.252.420 – matrix metalloproteinase 2
- MeSH D08.811.277.656.675.374.252.445 – matrix metalloproteinase 9
- MeSH D08.811.277.656.675.374.300 – insulysin
- MeSH D08.811.277.656.675.374.452 – lysostaphin
- MeSH D08.811.277.656.675.374.525 – matrix metalloproteinases
- MeSH D08.811.277.656.675.374.525.300 – matrix metalloproteinases, membrane-associated
- MeSH D08.811.277.656.675.374.525.300.500 – matrix metalloproteinase 14
- MeSH D08.811.277.656.675.374.525.300.625 – matrix metalloproteinase 15
- MeSH D08.811.277.656.675.374.525.300.750 – matrix metalloproteinase 16
- MeSH D08.811.277.656.675.374.525.300.875 – matrix metalloproteinase 17
- MeSH D08.811.277.656.675.374.525.300.500 – matrix metalloproteinase 14
- MeSH D08.811.277.656.675.374.525.300.625 – matrix metalloproteinase 15
- MeSH D08.811.277.656.675.374.525.300.750 – matrix metalloproteinase 16
- MeSH D08.811.277.656.675.374.525.300.875 – matrix metalloproteinase 17
- MeSH D08.811.277.656.675.374.525.700 – matrix metalloproteinases, secreted
- MeSH D08.811.277.656.675.374.525.700.100 – matrix metalloproteinase 1
- MeSH D08.811.277.656.675.374.525.700.150 – matrix metalloproteinase 2
- MeSH D08.811.277.656.675.374.525.700.200 – matrix metalloproteinase 3
- MeSH D08.811.277.656.675.374.525.700.250 – matrix metalloproteinase 7
- MeSH D08.811.277.656.675.374.525.700.300 – matrix metalloproteinase 8
- MeSH D08.811.277.656.675.374.525.700.350 – matrix metalloproteinase 9
- MeSH D08.811.277.656.675.374.525.700.400 – matrix metalloproteinase 10
- MeSH D08.811.277.656.675.374.525.700.450 – matrix metalloproteinase 11
- MeSH D08.811.277.656.675.374.525.700.500 – matrix metalloproteinase 12
- MeSH D08.811.277.656.675.374.525.700.550 – matrix metalloproteinase 13
- MeSH D08.811.277.656.675.374.525.700.800 – matrix metalloproteinase 20
- MeSH D08.811.277.656.675.374.525.700.900 – tolloid-like metalloproteinases
- MeSH D08.811.277.656.675.374.525.700.900.500 – bone morphogenetic protein 1
- MeSH D08.811.277.656.675.374.525.700.100 – matrix metalloproteinase 1
- MeSH D08.811.277.656.675.374.525.700.150 – matrix metalloproteinase 2
- MeSH D08.811.277.656.675.374.525.700.200 – matrix metalloproteinase 3
- MeSH D08.811.277.656.675.374.525.700.250 – matrix metalloproteinase 7
- MeSH D08.811.277.656.675.374.525.700.300 – matrix metalloproteinase 8
- MeSH D08.811.277.656.675.374.525.700.350 – matrix metalloproteinase 9
- MeSH D08.811.277.656.675.374.525.700.400 – matrix metalloproteinase 10
- MeSH D08.811.277.656.675.374.525.700.450 – matrix metalloproteinase 11
- MeSH D08.811.277.656.675.374.525.700.500 – matrix metalloproteinase 12
- MeSH D08.811.277.656.675.374.525.700.550 – matrix metalloproteinase 13
- MeSH D08.811.277.656.675.374.525.700.800 – matrix metalloproteinase 20
- MeSH D08.811.277.656.675.374.525.700.900 – tolloid-like metalloproteinases
- MeSH D08.811.277.656.675.374.525.700.900.500 – bone morphogenetic protein 1
- MeSH D08.811.277.656.675.374.563 – mitochondrial processing peptidase
- MeSH D08.811.277.656.675.374.600 – neprilysin
- MeSH D08.811.277.656.675.374.616 – phex phosphate regulating neutral endopeptidase
- MeSH D08.811.277.656.675.374.632 – pregnancy-associated plasma protein-a
- MeSH D08.811.277.656.675.374.664 – procollagen n-endopeptidase
- MeSH D08.811.277.656.675.374.680 – pronase
- MeSH D08.811.277.656.675.374.827 – thermolysin
- MeSH D08.811.277.656.675.555 – metalloexopeptidases
- MeSH D08.811.277.656.675.555.100 – cd13 antigens
- MeSH D08.811.277.656.675.555.200 – carboxypeptidase b
- MeSH D08.811.277.656.675.555.225 – carboxypeptidase b2
- MeSH D08.811.277.656.675.555.250 – carboxypeptidase h
- MeSH D08.811.277.656.675.555.350 – carboxypeptidases a
- MeSH D08.811.277.656.675.555.400 – cystinyl aminopeptidase
- MeSH D08.811.277.656.675.555.500 – glutamate carboxypeptidase ii
- MeSH D08.811.277.656.675.555.600 – glutamyl aminopeptidase
- MeSH D08.811.277.656.675.555.700 – leucyl aminopeptidase
- MeSH D08.811.277.656.675.555.750 – lysine carboxypeptidase
- MeSH D08.811.277.656.837 – proprotein convertases
- MeSH D08.811.277.656.837.061 – carboxypeptidase b
- MeSH D08.811.277.656.837.092 – carboxypeptidase b2
- MeSH D08.811.277.656.837.124 – carboxypeptidase h
- MeSH D08.811.277.656.837.249 – furin
- MeSH D08.811.277.656.837.500 – proprotein convertase 1
- MeSH D08.811.277.656.837.562 – proprotein convertase 2
- MeSH D08.811.277.656.837.625 – proprotein convertase 5
- MeSH D08.811.277.656.837.688 – proprotein convertase 9
- MeSH D08.811.277.656.837.750 – renin
- MeSH D08.811.277.656.918 – proteasome endopeptidase complex
- MeSH D08.811.277.656.959 – serine proteases
- MeSH D08.811.277.656.959.200 – cathepsin a
- MeSH D08.811.277.656.959.250 – dipeptidyl peptidase 4
- MeSH D08.811.277.656.959.350 – serine endopeptidases
- MeSH D08.811.277.656.959.350.030 – acrosin
- MeSH D08.811.277.656.959.350.066 – cathepsin g
- MeSH D08.811.277.656.959.350.103 – chymases
- MeSH D08.811.277.656.959.350.176 – chymotrypsin
- MeSH D08.811.277.656.959.350.198 – complement factor b
- MeSH D08.811.277.656.959.350.200 – complement factor d
- MeSH D08.811.277.656.959.350.210 – complement factor i
- MeSH D08.811.277.656.959.350.247 – endopeptidase k
- MeSH D08.811.277.656.959.350.284 – enteropeptidase
- MeSH D08.811.277.656.959.350.300 – factor viia
- MeSH D08.811.277.656.959.350.310 – factor ixa
- MeSH D08.811.277.656.959.350.315 – factor xa
- MeSH D08.811.277.656.959.350.320 – factor xia
- MeSH D08.811.277.656.959.350.324 – factor xiia
- MeSH D08.811.277.656.959.350.330 – fibrinolysin
- MeSH D08.811.277.656.959.350.353 – furin
- MeSH D08.811.277.656.959.350.397 – granzymes
- MeSH D08.811.277.656.959.350.420 – high-temperature requirement a serine peptidase 1
- MeSH D08.811.277.656.959.350.431 – high-temperature requirement a serine peptidase 2
- MeSH D08.811.277.656.959.350.442 – kallikreins
- MeSH D08.811.277.656.959.350.442.700 – plasma kallikrein
- MeSH D08.811.277.656.959.350.442.725 – prekallikrein
- MeSH D08.811.277.656.959.350.442.750 – prostate-specific antigen
- MeSH D08.811.277.656.959.350.442.875 – tissue kallikreins
- MeSH D08.811.277.656.959.350.471 – lactoferrin
- MeSH D08.811.277.656.959.350.501 – mannose-binding protein-associated serine proteases
- MeSH D08.811.277.656.959.350.530 – myeloblastin
- MeSH D08.811.277.656.959.350.560 – pancreatic elastase
- MeSH D08.811.277.656.959.350.560.500 – leukocyte elastase
- MeSH D08.811.277.656.959.350.635 – plasminogen activators
- MeSH D08.811.277.656.959.350.635.075 – anistreplase
- MeSH D08.811.277.656.959.350.638 – pronase
- MeSH D08.811.277.656.959.350.640 – proprotein convertase 1
- MeSH D08.811.277.656.959.350.646 – proprotein convertase 2
- MeSH D08.811.277.656.959.350.648 – proprotein convertase 5
- MeSH D08.811.277.656.959.350.718 – proprotein convertase 9
- MeSH D08.811.277.656.959.350.736 – prostasin
- MeSH D08.811.277.656.959.350.753 – reelin protein
- MeSH D08.811.277.656.959.350.787 – subtilisins
- MeSH D08.811.277.656.959.350.787.805 – subtilisin
- MeSH D08.811.277.656.959.350.855 – thrombin
- MeSH D08.811.277.656.959.350.875 – tissue plasminogen activator
- MeSH D08.811.277.656.959.350.875.500 – tenecteplase
- MeSH D08.811.277.656.959.350.895 – trypsin
- MeSH D08.811.277.656.959.350.902 – tryptases
- MeSH D08.811.277.656.959.350.910 – urokinase-type plasminogen activator
- MeSH D08.811.277.656.959.350.955 – venombin a
- MeSH D08.811.277.656.959.350.955.060 – ancrod
- MeSH D08.811.277.656.959.350.955.135 – batroxobin
- MeSH D08.811.277.656.959.560 – serine-type d-ala-d-ala carboxypeptidase
- MeSH D08.811.277.656.959.780 – tripeptidyl-peptidase 1
- MeSH D08.811.277.656.979 – viral proteases
- MeSH D08.811.277.656.979.250 – 3c viral proteases
- MeSH D08.811.277.656.979.250.500 – coronavirus 3c proteases
- MeSH D08.811.277.656.979.500 – hiv protease
- MeSH D08.811.277.656.979.750 – viral papain-like proteases
- MeSH D08.811.277.656.979.750.500 – coronavirus papain-like proteases
- MeSH D08.811.277.721 – protein-arginine deiminases
- MeSH D08.811.277.721.250 – protein-arginine deiminase type 1
- MeSH D08.811.277.721.313 – protein-arginine deiminase type 2
- MeSH D08.811.277.721.375 – protein-arginine deiminase type 3
- MeSH D08.811.277.721.438 – protein-arginine deiminase type 6
- MeSH D08.811.277.721.500 – protein-arginine deiminase type 4
- MeSH D08.811.277.785 – protein deglycase dj-1
- MeSH D08.811.277.913 – ureohydrolases
- MeSH D08.811.277.913.292 – arginase

==== MeSH D08.811.399 – isomerases ====
- MeSH D08.811.399.325 – cis-trans-isomerases
- MeSH D08.811.399.325.500 – peptidylprolyl isomerase
- MeSH D08.811.399.325.500.400 – immunophilins
- MeSH D08.811.399.325.500.400.300 – cyclophilins
- MeSH D08.811.399.325.500.400.300.500 – cyclophilin a
- MeSH D08.811.399.325.500.400.300.750 – cyclophilin c
- MeSH D08.811.399.325.500.400.300.813 – peptidyl-prolyl isomerase d
- MeSH D08.811.399.325.500.400.300.875 – peptidyl-prolyl isomerase f
- MeSH D08.811.399.325.500.400.700 – tacrolimus binding proteins
- MeSH D08.811.399.325.500.400.700.500 – tacrolimus binding protein 1a
- MeSH D08.811.399.325.500.400.700.501 – tacrolimus binding protein 5
- MeSH D08.811.399.325.500.700 – nima-interacting peptidylprolyl isomerase
- MeSH D08.811.399.325.500.850 – peptidyl-prolyl cis-trans isomerase nima-interacting 4
- MeSH D08.811.399.325.501 – retinoid isomerohydrolase
- MeSH D08.811.399.340 – dna helicases
- MeSH D08.811.399.340.001 – dna excision repair protein ercc-5
- MeSH D08.811.399.340.124 – dnab helicases
- MeSH D08.811.399.340.155 – ku autoantigen
- MeSH D08.811.399.340.186 – minichromosome maintenance proteins
- MeSH D08.811.399.340.186.200 – minichromosome maintenance complex component 2
- MeSH D08.811.399.340.186.300 – minichromosome maintenance complex component 3
- MeSH D08.811.399.340.186.400 – minichromosome maintenance complex component 4
- MeSH D08.811.399.340.186.500 – minichromosome maintenance complex component 5
- MeSH D08.811.399.340.186.600 – minichromosome maintenance complex component 6
- MeSH D08.811.399.340.186.700 – minichromosome maintenance complex component 7
- MeSH D08.811.399.340.186.800 – minichromosome maintenance complex component 8
- MeSH D08.811.399.340.186.900 – minichromosome maintenance complex component 9
- MeSH D08.811.399.340.249 – recq helicases
- MeSH D08.811.399.340.249.500 – werner syndrome helicase
- MeSH D08.811.399.340.375 – x-linked nuclear protein
- MeSH D08.811.399.340.500 – xeroderma pigmentosum group d protein
- MeSH D08.811.399.403 – dna topoisomerases
- MeSH D08.811.399.403.483 – dna topoisomerases, type i
- MeSH D08.811.399.403.741 – dna topoisomerases, type ii
- MeSH D08.811.399.403.741.149 – dna gyrase
- MeSH D08.811.399.403.741.224 – dna topoisomerase iv
- MeSH D08.811.399.430 – intramolecular lyases
- MeSH D08.811.399.430.500 – myo-inositol-1-phosphate synthase
- MeSH D08.811.399.475 – intramolecular oxidoreductases
- MeSH D08.811.399.475.200 – aldose-ketose isomerases
- MeSH D08.811.399.475.200.350 – glucose-6-phosphate isomerase
- MeSH D08.811.399.475.200.550 – mannose-6-phosphate isomerase
- MeSH D08.811.399.475.200.775 – triose-phosphate isomerase
- MeSH D08.811.399.475.400 – carbon-carbon double bond isomerases
- MeSH D08.811.399.475.400.349 – dodecenoyl-coa isomerase
- MeSH D08.811.399.475.400.349.500 – peroxisomal bifunctional enzyme
- MeSH D08.811.399.475.400.700 – steroid isomerases
- MeSH D08.811.399.475.600 – prostaglandin-e synthases
- MeSH D08.811.399.475.800 – sulfur-sulfur bond isomerases
- MeSH D08.811.399.475.800.550 – protein disulfide-isomerases
- MeSH D08.811.399.475.900 – thromboxane-a synthase
- MeSH D08.811.399.520 – intramolecular transferases
- MeSH D08.811.399.520.100 – 2-acetolactate mutase
- MeSH D08.811.399.520.250 – chorismate mutase
- MeSH D08.811.399.520.250.500 – prephenate dehydratase
- MeSH D08.811.399.520.250.750 – prephenate dehydrogenase
- MeSH D08.811.399.520.625 – methylmalonyl-coa mutase
- MeSH D08.811.399.520.750 – phosphotransferases (phosphomutases)
- MeSH D08.811.399.520.750.250 – bisphosphoglycerate mutase
- MeSH D08.811.399.520.750.625 – phosphoglucomutase
- MeSH D08.811.399.520.750.700 – phosphoglycerate mutase
- MeSH D08.811.399.894 – racemases and epimerases
- MeSH D08.811.399.894.200 – amino acid isomerases
- MeSH D08.811.399.894.200.200 – alanine racemase
- MeSH D08.811.399.894.200.201 – serine racemase
- MeSH D08.811.399.894.500 – carbohydrate epimerases
- MeSH D08.811.399.894.500.700 – udpglucose 4-epimerase

==== MeSH D08.811.464 – ligases ====
- MeSH D08.811.464.257 – carbon-carbon ligases
- MeSH D08.811.464.257.050 – acetyl-coa carboxylase
- MeSH D08.811.464.257.050.500 – propionyl-coenzyme a carboxylase
- MeSH D08.811.464.257.275 – polyketide synthases
- MeSH D08.811.464.257.500 – pyruvate carboxylase
- MeSH D08.811.464.259 – carbon-nitrogen ligases
- MeSH D08.811.464.259.100 – adenylosuccinate synthase
- MeSH D08.811.464.259.200 – amide synthases
- MeSH D08.811.464.259.200.200 – aspartate-ammonia ligase
- MeSH D08.811.464.259.200.600 – glutamate-ammonia ligase
- MeSH D08.811.464.259.300 – argininosuccinate synthase
- MeSH D08.811.464.259.350 – carbamoyl-phosphate synthase (ammonia)
- MeSH D08.811.464.259.400 – carbon-nitrogen ligases with glutamine as amide-n-donor
- MeSH D08.811.464.259.400.300 – carbamoyl-phosphate synthase (glutamine-hydrolyzing)
- MeSH D08.811.464.259.550 – formate-tetrahydrofolate ligase
- MeSH D08.811.464.259.850 – peptide synthases
- MeSH D08.811.464.259.850.400 – glutamate-cysteine ligase
- MeSH D08.811.464.259.850.500 – glutathione synthase
- MeSH D08.811.464.263 – carbon-oxygen ligases
- MeSH D08.811.464.263.200 – amino acyl-trna synthetases
- MeSH D08.811.464.263.200.050 – alanine-trna ligase
- MeSH D08.811.464.263.200.100 – arginine-trna ligase
- MeSH D08.811.464.263.200.150 – aspartate-trna ligase
- MeSH D08.811.464.263.200.250 – glutamate-trna ligase
- MeSH D08.811.464.263.200.350 – glycine-trna ligase
- MeSH D08.811.464.263.200.400 – histidine-trna ligase
- MeSH D08.811.464.263.200.450 – isoleucine-trna ligase
- MeSH D08.811.464.263.200.500 – leucine-trna ligase
- MeSH D08.811.464.263.200.550 – lysine-trna ligase
- MeSH D08.811.464.263.200.600 – methionine-trna ligase
- MeSH D08.811.464.263.200.650 – phenylalanine-trna ligase
- MeSH D08.811.464.263.200.750 – serine-trna ligase
- MeSH D08.811.464.263.200.800 – threonine-trna ligase
- MeSH D08.811.464.263.200.850 – tryptophan-trna ligase
- MeSH D08.811.464.263.200.900 – tyrosine-trna ligase
- MeSH D08.811.464.263.200.950 – valine-trna ligase
- MeSH D08.811.464.267 – carbon-sulfur ligases
- MeSH D08.811.464.267.500 – coenzyme a ligases
- MeSH D08.811.464.267.500.200 – acetate-coa ligase
- MeSH D08.811.464.267.500.400 – long-chain-fatty-acid-coa ligase
- MeSH D08.811.464.267.500.600 – succinate-coa ligases
- MeSH D08.811.464.754 – polynucleotide ligases
- MeSH D08.811.464.754.600 – dna ligases
- MeSH D08.811.464.754.600.500 – dna ligase atp
- MeSH D08.811.464.754.720 – rna ligase (atp)
- MeSH D08.811.464.938 – ubiquitin-protein ligase complexes
- MeSH D08.811.464.938.249 – ubiquitin-activating enzymes
- MeSH D08.811.464.938.500 – ubiquitin-conjugating enzymes
- MeSH D08.811.464.938.500.500 – ubiquitin-conjugating enzyme ubc9
- MeSH D08.811.464.938.750 – ubiquitin-protein ligases
- MeSH D08.811.464.938.750.092 – anaphase-promoting complex-cyclosome
- MeSH D08.811.464.938.750.092.500 – apc1 subunit, anaphase-promoting complex-cyclosome
- MeSH D08.811.464.938.750.092.625 – apc10 subunit, anaphase-promoting complex-cyclosome
- MeSH D08.811.464.938.750.092.687 – apc11 subunit, anaphase-promoting complex-cyclosome
- MeSH D08.811.464.938.750.092.750 – apc2 subunit, anaphase-promoting complex-cyclosome
- MeSH D08.811.464.938.750.092.875 – apc3 subunit, anaphase-promoting complex-cyclosome
- MeSH D08.811.464.938.750.092.937 – apc4 subunit, anaphase-promoting complex-cyclosome
- MeSH D08.811.464.938.750.092.968 – apc5 subunit, anaphase-promoting complex-cyclosome
- MeSH D08.811.464.938.750.092.984 – apc6 subunit, anaphase-promoting complex-cyclosome
- MeSH D08.811.464.938.750.092.992 – apc7 subunit, anaphase-promoting complex-cyclosome
- MeSH D08.811.464.938.750.092.996 – apc8 subunit, anaphase-promoting complex-cyclosome
- MeSH D08.811.464.938.750.092.998 – cdc20 proteins
- MeSH D08.811.464.938.750.092.999 – cdh1 proteins
- MeSH D08.811.464.938.750.186 – fanconi anemia complementation group l protein
- MeSH D08.811.464.938.750.210 – inhibitor of apoptosis proteins
- MeSH D08.811.464.938.750.210.250 – baculoviral iap repeat-containing 3 protein
- MeSH D08.811.464.938.750.210.500 – neuronal apoptosis-inhibitory protein
- MeSH D08.811.464.938.750.210.750 – x-linked inhibitor of apoptosis protein
- MeSH D08.811.464.938.750.233 – mucosa-associated lymphoid tissue lymphoma translocation 1 protein
- MeSH D08.811.464.938.750.257 – nedd4 ubiquitin protein ligases
- MeSH D08.811.464.938.750.280 – polycomb repressive complex 1
- MeSH D08.811.464.938.750.374 – proto-oncogene proteins c-cbl
- MeSH D08.811.464.938.750.562 – proto-oncogene proteins c-mdm2
- MeSH D08.811.464.938.750.656 – receptors, autocrine motility factor
- MeSH D08.811.464.938.750.703 – seven in absentia proteins
- MeSH D08.811.464.938.750.750 – skp cullin f-box protein ligases
- MeSH D08.811.464.938.750.750.500 – cullin proteins
- MeSH D08.811.464.938.750.750.750 – f-box-wd repeat-containing protein 7
- MeSH D08.811.464.938.750.766 – trim21 protein
- MeSH D08.811.464.938.750.782 – tripartite motif-containing protein 28
- MeSH D08.811.464.938.750.813 – tumor necrosis factor alpha-induced protein 3
- MeSH D08.811.464.938.750.875 – von hippel-lindau tumor suppressor protein

==== MeSH D08.811.520 – lyases ====
- MeSH D08.811.520.224 – carbon-carbon lyases
- MeSH D08.811.520.224.062 – aldehyde-lyases
- MeSH D08.811.520.224.062.400 – fructose-bisphosphate aldolase
- MeSH D08.811.520.224.125 – carboxy-lyases
- MeSH D08.811.520.224.125.050 – adenosylmethionine decarboxylase
- MeSH D08.811.520.224.125.100 – aromatic-l-amino-acid decarboxylases
- MeSH D08.811.520.224.125.100.500 – dopa decarboxylase
- MeSH D08.811.520.224.125.250 – glutamate decarboxylase
- MeSH D08.811.520.224.125.300 – histidine decarboxylase
- MeSH D08.811.520.224.125.350 – indole-3-glycerol-phosphate synthase
- MeSH D08.811.520.224.125.387 – methylmalonyl-coa decarboxylase
- MeSH D08.811.520.224.125.425 – ornithine decarboxylase
- MeSH D08.811.520.224.125.450 – orotidine-5'-phosphate decarboxylase
- MeSH D08.811.520.224.125.500 – phosphoenolpyruvate carboxykinase (atp)
- MeSH D08.811.520.224.125.550 – phosphoenolpyruvate carboxykinase (gtp)
- MeSH D08.811.520.224.125.650 – phosphoenolpyruvate carboxylase
- MeSH D08.811.520.224.125.750 – pyruvate decarboxylase
- MeSH D08.811.520.224.125.800 – ribulose-bisphosphate carboxylase
- MeSH D08.811.520.224.125.875 – tyrosine decarboxylase
- MeSH D08.811.520.224.125.900 – uroporphyrinogen decarboxylase
- MeSH D08.811.520.224.187 – deoxyribodipyrimidine photo-lyase
- MeSH D08.811.520.224.600 – oxo-acid-lyases
- MeSH D08.811.520.224.600.200 – anthranilate synthase
- MeSH D08.811.520.224.600.700 – isocitrate lyase
- MeSH D08.811.520.224.800 – tryptophanase
- MeSH D08.811.520.224.900 – tyrosine phenol-lyase
- MeSH D08.811.520.232 – carbon-nitrogen lyases
- MeSH D08.811.520.232.300 – amidine-lyases
- MeSH D08.811.520.232.300.200 – adenylosuccinate lyase
- MeSH D08.811.520.232.300.400 – argininosuccinate lyase
- MeSH D08.811.520.232.300.400.500 – delta-crystallins
- MeSH D08.811.520.232.400 – ammonia-lyases
- MeSH D08.811.520.232.400.200 – aspartate ammonia-lyase
- MeSH D08.811.520.232.400.350 – ethanolamine ammonia-lyase
- MeSH D08.811.520.232.400.500 – histidine ammonia-lyase
- MeSH D08.811.520.232.400.600 – l-serine dehydratase
- MeSH D08.811.520.232.400.700 – phenylalanine ammonia-lyase
- MeSH D08.811.520.232.400.850 – threonine dehydratase
- MeSH D08.811.520.241 – carbon-oxygen lyases
- MeSH D08.811.520.241.225 – dna-(apurinic or apyrimidinic site) lyase
- MeSH D08.811.520.241.300 – hydro-lyases
- MeSH D08.811.520.241.300.050 – aconitate hydratase
- MeSH D08.811.520.241.300.050.500 – iron regulatory protein 1
- MeSH D08.811.520.241.300.050.750 – iron regulatory protein 2
- MeSH D08.811.520.241.300.150 – carbonic anhydrases
- MeSH D08.811.520.241.300.150.100 – carbonic anhydrase i
- MeSH D08.811.520.241.300.150.200 – carbonic anhydrase ii
- MeSH D08.811.520.241.300.150.300 – carbonic anhydrase iii
- MeSH D08.811.520.241.300.150.400 – carbonic anhydrase iv
- MeSH D08.811.520.241.300.150.450 – carbonic anhydrase ix
- MeSH D08.811.520.241.300.150.500 – carbonic anhydrase v
- MeSH D08.811.520.241.300.200 – cystathionine beta-synthase
- MeSH D08.811.520.241.300.250 – enoyl-coa hydratase
- MeSH D08.811.520.241.300.250.249 – mitochondrial trifunctional protein
- MeSH D08.811.520.241.300.250.249.500 – mitochondrial trifunctional protein, alpha subunit
- MeSH D08.811.520.241.300.250.750 – peroxisomal bifunctional enzyme
- MeSH D08.811.520.241.300.275 – enoyl-coa hydratase 2
- MeSH D08.811.520.241.300.275.500 – peroxisomal multifunctional protein-2
- MeSH D08.811.520.241.300.287 – fatty acid synthases
- MeSH D08.811.520.241.300.287.099 – fatty acid synthase, type i
- MeSH D08.811.520.241.300.287.200 – fatty acid synthase, type ii
- MeSH D08.811.520.241.300.300 – fumarate hydratase
- MeSH D08.811.520.241.300.500 – phosphopyruvate hydratase
- MeSH D08.811.520.241.300.500.500 – tau-crystallins
- MeSH D08.811.520.241.300.550 – porphobilinogen synthase
- MeSH D08.811.520.241.300.600 – prephenate dehydratase
- MeSH D08.811.520.241.300.650 – propanediol dehydratase
- MeSH D08.811.520.241.300.850 – tryptophan synthase
- MeSH D08.811.520.241.300.900 – urocanate hydratase
- MeSH D08.811.520.241.300.950 – uroporphyrinogen iii synthetase
- MeSH D08.811.520.241.700 – polysaccharide-lyases
- MeSH D08.811.520.241.700.350 – chondroitinases and chondroitin lyases
- MeSH D08.811.520.241.700.350.500 – chondroitin lyases
- MeSH D08.811.520.241.700.350.500.500 – chondroitin abc lyase
- MeSH D08.811.520.241.700.512 – heparin lyase
- MeSH D08.811.520.241.700.675 – hyaluronoglucosaminidase
- MeSH D08.811.520.300 – carbon-sulfur lyases
- MeSH D08.811.520.300.250 – cystathionine gamma-lyase
- MeSH D08.811.520.300.500 – lactoylglutathione lyase
- MeSH D08.811.520.500 – ferrochelatase
- MeSH D08.811.520.650 – phosphorus-oxygen lyases
- MeSH D08.811.520.650.200 – adenylyl cyclases
- MeSH D08.811.520.650.200.040 – adenylate cyclase toxin
- MeSH D08.811.520.650.600 – guanylate cyclase
- MeSH D08.811.520.650.600.500 – receptors, guanylate cyclase-coupled
- MeSH D08.811.520.650.600.500.250 – receptors, enterotoxin
- MeSH D08.811.520.650.600.500.500 – receptors, atrial natriuretic factor
- MeSH D08.811.520.650.600.500.500.002 – atrial natriuretic factor receptor b
- MeSH D08.811.520.650.600.750 – soluble guanylyl cyclase
- MeSH D08.811.520.650.800 – phosphatidylinositol diacylglycerol-lyase

==== MeSH D08.811.600 – multienzyme complexes ====
- MeSH D08.811.600.075 – anthranilate phosphoribosyltransferase
- MeSH D08.811.600.085 – anthranilate synthase
- MeSH D08.811.600.250 – electron transport chain complex proteins
- MeSH D08.811.600.250.500 – electron-transferring flavoproteins
- MeSH D08.811.600.250.500.500 – electron transport complex i
- MeSH D08.811.600.250.500.750 – electron transport complex ii
- MeSH D08.811.600.250.500.750.500 – succinate dehydrogenase
- MeSH D08.811.600.250.687 – electron transport complex iv
- MeSH D08.811.600.250.781 – mitochondrial proton-translocating atpases
- MeSH D08.811.600.250.875 – succinate cytochrome c oxidoreductase
- MeSH D08.811.600.250.875.249 – electron transport complex ii
- MeSH D08.811.600.250.875.249.500 – succinate dehydrogenase
- MeSH D08.811.600.250.875.500 – electron transport complex iii
- MeSH D08.811.600.283 – exosome multienzyme ribonuclease complex
- MeSH D08.811.600.354 – fatty acid synthase, type ii
- MeSH D08.811.600.391 – glycine decarboxylase complex
- MeSH D08.811.600.391.100 – aminomethyltransferase
- MeSH D08.811.600.391.150 – dihydrolipoamide dehydrogenase
- MeSH D08.811.600.391.175 – glycine decarboxylase complex h-protein
- MeSH D08.811.600.391.200 – glycine dehydrogenase (decarboxylating)
- MeSH D08.811.600.465 – ketoglutarate dehydrogenase complex
- MeSH D08.811.600.465.500 – dihydrolipoamide dehydrogenase
- MeSH D08.811.600.620 – mi-2 nucleosome remodeling and deacetylase complex
- MeSH D08.811.600.620.100 – histone deacetylase 1
- MeSH D08.811.600.620.200 – histone deacetylase 2
- MeSH D08.811.600.620.775 – retinoblastoma-binding protein 4
- MeSH D08.811.600.620.887 – retinoblastoma-binding protein 7
- MeSH D08.811.600.700 – phosphoenolpyruvate sugar phosphotransferase system
- MeSH D08.811.600.710 – photosynthetic reaction center complex proteins
- MeSH D08.811.600.710.374 – cytochrome b6f complex
- MeSH D08.811.600.710.374.500 – cytochromes b6
- MeSH D08.811.600.710.374.750 – cytochromes f
- MeSH D08.811.600.710.374.875 – plastoquinol-plastocyanin reductase
- MeSH D08.811.600.710.490 – light-harvesting protein complexes
- MeSH D08.811.600.710.490.249 – chlorophyll binding proteins
- MeSH D08.811.600.710.490.500 – phycobilisomes
- MeSH D08.811.600.710.490.500.500 – phycobiliproteins
- MeSH D08.811.600.710.490.500.500.755 – phycocyanin
- MeSH D08.811.600.710.490.500.500.777 – phycoerythrin
- MeSH D08.811.600.710.500 – photosystem i protein complex
- MeSH D08.811.600.710.750 – photosystem ii protein complex
- MeSH D08.811.600.715 – polyketide synthases
- MeSH D08.811.600.720 – prostaglandin-endoperoxide synthases
- MeSH D08.811.600.720.500 – cyclooxygenase 1
- MeSH D08.811.600.720.750 – cyclooxygenase 2
- MeSH D08.811.600.730 – proteasome endopeptidase complex
- MeSH D08.811.600.741 – pyruvate dehydrogenase complex
- MeSH D08.811.600.741.525 – dihydrolipoamide dehydrogenase
- MeSH D08.811.600.741.625 – dihydrolipoyllysine-residue acetyltransferase
- MeSH D08.811.600.741.725 – pyruvate dehydrogenase (lipoamide)
- MeSH D08.811.600.795 – sin3 histone deacetylase and corepressor complex
- MeSH D08.811.600.795.100 – histone deacetylase 1
- MeSH D08.811.600.795.200 – histone deacetylase 2
- MeSH D08.811.600.795.775 – retinoblastoma-binding protein 4
- MeSH D08.811.600.795.887 – retinoblastoma-binding protein 7
- MeSH D08.811.600.850 – sucrase-isomaltase complex
- MeSH D08.811.600.896 – tryptophan synthase
- MeSH D08.811.600.948 – viral replicase complex proteins

==== MeSH D08.811.641 – multifunctional enzymes ====
- MeSH D08.811.641.249 – acetyl-coa carboxylase
- MeSH D08.811.641.260 – n-acetyllactosamine synthase
- MeSH D08.811.641.500 – aspartate carbamoyltransferase
- MeSH D08.811.641.750 – aspartokinase homoserine dehydrogenase
- MeSH D08.811.641.752 – cyclin-dependent kinase 9
- MeSH D08.811.641.755 – dual-specificity phosphatases
- MeSH D08.811.641.755.100 – cdc25 phosphatases
- MeSH D08.811.641.755.200 – dual specificity phosphatase 1
- MeSH D08.811.641.755.250 – dual specificity phosphatase 2
- MeSH D08.811.641.755.300 – dual specificity phosphatase 3
- MeSH D08.811.641.755.600 – dual specificity phosphatase 6
- MeSH D08.811.641.758 – fatty acid synthase, type i
- MeSH D08.811.641.761 – lactase-phlorizin hydrolase
- MeSH D08.811.641.765 – mitochondrial trifunctional protein
- MeSH D08.811.641.765.200 – mitochondrial trifunctional protein, alpha subunit
- MeSH D08.811.641.765.500 – mitochondrial trifunctional protein, beta subunit
- MeSH D08.811.641.773 – peroxiredoxin vi
- MeSH D08.811.641.781 – peroxisomal bifunctional enzyme
- MeSH D08.811.641.812 – peroxisomal multifunctional protein-2
- MeSH D08.811.641.843 – phosphofructokinase-2

==== MeSH D08.811.682 – oxidoreductases ====
- MeSH D08.811.682.047 – alcohol oxidoreductases
- MeSH D08.811.682.047.150 – carbohydrate dehydrogenases
- MeSH D08.811.682.047.150.225 – fructuronate reductase
- MeSH D08.811.682.047.150.250 – galactose dehydrogenases
- MeSH D08.811.682.047.150.270 – glucose dehydrogenases
- MeSH D08.811.682.047.150.270.500 – glucose 1-dehydrogenase
- MeSH D08.811.682.047.150.300 – glucosephosphate dehydrogenase
- MeSH D08.811.682.047.150.600 – phosphogluconate dehydrogenase
- MeSH D08.811.682.047.150.650 – phosphoglycerate dehydrogenase
- MeSH D08.811.682.047.150.700 – sugar alcohol dehydrogenases
- MeSH D08.811.682.047.150.700.156 – aldo-keto reductases
- MeSH D08.811.682.047.150.700.156.500 – aldehyde reductase
- MeSH D08.811.682.047.150.700.156.625 – aldo-keto reductase family 1 member b10
- MeSH D08.811.682.047.150.700.156.750 – aldo-keto reductase family 1 member c2
- MeSH D08.811.682.047.150.700.156.875 – aldo-keto reductase family 1 member c3
- MeSH D08.811.682.047.150.700.156.937 – 20-alpha-hydroxysteroid dehydrogenase
- MeSH D08.811.682.047.150.700.237 – d-xylulose reductase
- MeSH D08.811.682.047.150.700.400 – glycerolphosphate dehydrogenase
- MeSH D08.811.682.047.150.700.400.500 – glycerol-3-phosphate dehydrogenase (nad )
- MeSH D08.811.682.047.150.700.437 – l-gulonolactone oxidase
- MeSH D08.811.682.047.150.700.475 – l-iditol 2-dehydrogenase
- MeSH D08.811.682.047.150.700.649 – mannitol dehydrogenases
- MeSH D08.811.682.047.150.900 – uridine diphosphate glucose dehydrogenase
- MeSH D08.811.682.047.180 – choline dehydrogenase
- MeSH D08.811.682.047.210 – galactose oxidase
- MeSH D08.811.682.047.239 – glucose oxidase
- MeSH D08.811.682.047.436 – hydroxysteroid dehydrogenases
- MeSH D08.811.682.047.436.174 – 11-beta-hydroxysteroid dehydrogenases
- MeSH D08.811.682.047.436.174.300 – 11-beta-hydroxysteroid dehydrogenase type 1
- MeSH D08.811.682.047.436.174.600 – 11-beta-hydroxysteroid dehydrogenase type 2
- MeSH D08.811.682.047.436.350 – 3-hydroxysteroid dehydrogenases
- MeSH D08.811.682.047.436.350.100 – 3-alpha-hydroxysteroid dehydrogenase (b-specific)
- MeSH D08.811.682.047.436.350.150 – cholesterol oxidase
- MeSH D08.811.682.047.436.350.700 – progesterone reductase
- MeSH D08.811.682.047.436.375 – 17-hydroxysteroid dehydrogenases
- MeSH D08.811.682.047.436.375.140 – aldo-keto reductase family 1 member c3
- MeSH D08.811.682.047.436.375.280 – estradiol dehydrogenases
- MeSH D08.811.682.047.436.375.640 – peroxisomal multifunctional protein-2
- MeSH D08.811.682.047.551 – lactate dehydrogenases
- MeSH D08.811.682.047.551.249 – epsilon-crystallins
- MeSH D08.811.682.047.551.400 – l-lactate dehydrogenase
- MeSH D08.811.682.047.551.400.500 – lactate dehydrogenase 5
- MeSH D08.811.682.047.551.500 – l-lactate dehydrogenase (cytochrome)
- MeSH D08.811.682.047.820 – nad ( ) and nadp ( ) dependent alcohol oxidoreductases
- MeSH D08.811.682.047.820.100 – 11-beta-hydroxysteroid dehydrogenases
- MeSH D08.811.682.047.820.100.300 – 11-beta-hydroxysteroid dehydrogenase type 1
- MeSH D08.811.682.047.820.100.600 – 11-beta-hydroxysteroid dehydrogenase type 2
- MeSH D08.811.682.047.820.125 – 20-hydroxysteroid dehydrogenases
- MeSH D08.811.682.047.820.125.074 – 20-alpha-hydroxysteroid dehydrogenase
- MeSH D08.811.682.047.820.125.150 – cortisone reductase
- MeSH D08.811.682.047.820.150 – 3-hydroxyacyl coa dehydrogenases
- MeSH D08.811.682.047.820.150.207 – 3-hydroxyacyl-coa dehydrogenase
- MeSH D08.811.682.047.820.150.207.500 – peroxisomal bifunctional enzyme
- MeSH D08.811.682.047.820.150.415 – hydroxymethylglutaryl coa reductases
- MeSH D08.811.682.047.820.150.415.250 – hydroxymethylglutaryl-coa reductases, nad-dependent
- MeSH D08.811.682.047.820.150.415.750 – hydroxymethylglutaryl-coa-reductases, nadp-dependent
- MeSH D08.811.682.047.820.150.707 – long-chain-3-hydroxyacyl-coa dehydrogenase
- MeSH D08.811.682.047.820.150.707.249 – mitochondrial trifunctional protein
- MeSH D08.811.682.047.820.150.707.249.500 – mitochondrial trifunctional protein, alpha subunit
- MeSH D08.811.682.047.820.150.707.249.500 – mitochondrial trifunctional protein, alpha subunit
- MeSH D08.811.682.047.820.150.926 – peroxisomal multifunctional protein-2
- MeSH D08.811.682.047.820.186 – 3-alpha-hydroxysteroid dehydrogenase (b-specific)
- MeSH D08.811.682.047.820.193 – 3-isopropylmalate dehydrogenase
- MeSH D08.811.682.047.820.196 – 3-oxoacyl-(acyl-carrier-protein) reductase
- MeSH D08.811.682.047.820.196.500 – fatty acid synthases
- MeSH D08.811.682.047.820.196.500.099 – fatty acid synthase, type i
- MeSH D08.811.682.047.820.196.500.200 – fatty acid synthase, type ii
- MeSH D08.811.682.047.820.200 – acetoin dehydrogenase
- MeSH D08.811.682.047.820.250 – alcohol dehydrogenase
- MeSH D08.811.682.047.820.284 – aldo-keto reductases
- MeSH D08.811.682.047.820.284.500 – aldehyde reductase
- MeSH D08.811.682.047.820.284.750 – 20-alpha-hydroxysteroid dehydrogenase
- MeSH D08.811.682.047.820.284.813 – aldo-keto reductase family 1 member b10
- MeSH D08.811.682.047.820.284.875 – aldo-keto reductase family 1 member c2
- MeSH D08.811.682.047.820.284.937 – aldo-keto reductase family 1 member c3
- MeSH D08.811.682.047.820.289 – carbonyl reductase (nadph)
- MeSH D08.811.682.047.820.293 – glycerol-3-phosphate dehydrogenase (nad )
- MeSH D08.811.682.047.820.300 – homoserine dehydrogenase
- MeSH D08.811.682.047.820.300.060 – aspartokinase homoserine dehydrogenase
- MeSH D08.811.682.047.820.350 – hydroxybutyrate dehydrogenase
- MeSH D08.811.682.047.820.375 – hydroxyprostaglandin dehydrogenases
- MeSH D08.811.682.047.820.375.500 – aldo-keto reductase family 1 member c3
- MeSH D08.811.682.047.820.400 – hydroxypyruvate reductase
- MeSH D08.811.682.047.820.450 – imp dehydrogenase
- MeSH D08.811.682.047.820.475 – isocitrate dehydrogenase
- MeSH D08.811.682.047.820.487 – ketol-acid reductoisomerase
- MeSH D08.811.682.047.820.493 – l-lactate dehydrogenase
- MeSH D08.811.682.047.820.496 – malate dehydrogenase
- MeSH D08.811.682.047.820.498 – malate dehydrogenase (nadp )
- MeSH D08.811.682.047.820.500 – progesterone reductase
- MeSH D08.811.682.047.820.800 – d-xylulose reductase
- MeSH D08.811.682.047.820.900 – short chain dehydrogenase-reductases
- MeSH D08.811.682.047.820.900.500 – ww domain-containing oxidoreductase
- MeSH D08.811.682.047.892 – xanthine dehydrogenase
- MeSH D08.811.682.047.928 – xanthine oxidase
- MeSH D08.811.682.081 – alternative oxidase
- MeSH D08.811.682.113 – arsenate reductases
- MeSH D08.811.682.180 – ascorbate oxidase
- MeSH D08.811.682.226 – ceruloplasmin
- MeSH D08.811.682.285 – electron transport complex iv
- MeSH D08.811.682.400 – hydrogenase
- MeSH D08.811.682.494 – laccase
- MeSH D08.811.682.517 – luciferases
- MeSH D08.811.682.517.500 – luciferases, bacterial
- MeSH D08.811.682.517.750 – luciferases, firefly
- MeSH D08.811.682.517.875 – luciferases, renilla
- MeSH D08.811.682.550 – 5,10-methylenetetrahydrofolate reductase (fadh2)
- MeSH D08.811.682.608 – nadh, nadph oxidoreductases
- MeSH D08.811.682.608.047 – apoptosis inducing factor
- MeSH D08.811.682.608.191 – cytochrome reductases
- MeSH D08.811.682.608.191.237 – cytochrome-b(5) reductase
- MeSH D08.811.682.608.191.500 – nadph-ferrihemoprotein reductase
- MeSH D08.811.682.608.504 – electron transport complex i
- MeSH D08.811.682.608.504.500 – nadh dehydrogenase
- MeSH D08.811.682.608.530 – nadh tetrazolium reductase
- MeSH D08.811.682.608.540 – nadp transhydrogenases
- MeSH D08.811.682.608.540.500 – nadp transhydrogenase, ab-specific
- MeSH D08.811.682.608.540.750 – nadp transhydrogenase, b-specific
- MeSH D08.811.682.608.550 – nadph dehydrogenase
- MeSH D08.811.682.608.575 – nadph oxidases
- MeSH D08.811.682.608.575.500 – dual oxidases
- MeSH D08.811.682.608.575.750 – nadph oxidase 1
- MeSH D08.811.682.608.575.875 – nadph oxidase 2
- MeSH D08.811.682.608.575.937 – nadph oxidase 4
- MeSH D08.811.682.608.575.968 – nadph oxidase 5
- MeSH D08.811.682.608.800 – quinone reductases
- MeSH D08.811.682.608.800.500 – nad(p)h dehydrogenase (quinone)
- MeSH D08.811.682.608.800.500.500 – zeta-crystallins
- MeSH D08.811.682.647 – nitrogenase
- MeSH D08.811.682.647.200 – dinitrogenase reductase
- MeSH D08.811.682.647.550 – molybdoferredoxin
- MeSH D08.811.682.655 – nitroreductases
- MeSH D08.811.682.655.249 – gmp reductase
- MeSH D08.811.682.655.500 – nitrate reductases
- MeSH D08.811.682.655.500.124 – nitrate reductase
- MeSH D08.811.682.655.500.200 – nitrate reductase (nadh)
- MeSH D08.811.682.655.500.249 – nitrate reductase (nad(p)h)
- MeSH D08.811.682.655.500.374 – nitrate reductase (nadph)
- MeSH D08.811.682.655.750 – nitrite reductases
- MeSH D08.811.682.655.750.249 – ferredoxin-nitrite reductase
- MeSH D08.811.682.655.750.500 – nitrite reductase (nad(p)h)
- MeSH D08.811.682.657 – oxidoreductases acting on aldehyde or oxo group donors
- MeSH D08.811.682.657.163 – aldehyde oxidoreductases
- MeSH D08.811.682.657.163.249 – aldehyde dehydrogenase
- MeSH D08.811.682.657.163.249.188 – aldehyde dehydrogenase 1 family
- MeSH D08.811.682.657.163.249.375 – aldehyde dehydrogenase, mitochondrial
- MeSH D08.811.682.657.163.249.750 – omega-crystallins
- MeSH D08.811.682.657.163.249.875 – retinal dehydrogenase
- MeSH D08.811.682.657.163.311 – aldehyde oxidase
- MeSH D08.811.682.657.163.342 – aminomuconate-semialdehyde dehydrogenase
- MeSH D08.811.682.657.163.374 – aspartate-semialdehyde dehydrogenase
- MeSH D08.811.682.657.163.468 – benzaldehyde dehydrogenase (nadp )
- MeSH D08.811.682.657.163.515 – betaine-aldehyde dehydrogenase
- MeSH D08.811.682.657.163.562 – glutamate-5-semialdehyde dehydrogenase
- MeSH D08.811.682.657.163.750 – glyceraldehyde-3-phosphate dehydrogenases
- MeSH D08.811.682.657.163.750.250 – glyceraldehyde 3-phosphate dehydrogenase (nadp )
- MeSH D08.811.682.657.163.750.300 – glyceraldehyde-3-phosphate dehydrogenase (nadp )(phosphorylating)
- MeSH D08.811.682.657.163.750.350 – glyceraldehyde-3-phosphate dehydrogenase (phosphorylating)
- MeSH D08.811.682.657.163.781 – glycolaldehyde dehydrogenase
- MeSH D08.811.682.657.163.796 – l-aminoadipate-semialdehyde dehydrogenase
- MeSH D08.811.682.657.163.812 – malonate-semialdehyde dehydrogenase (acetylating)
- MeSH D08.811.682.657.163.827 – methylmalonate-semialdehyde dehydrogenase (acylating)
- MeSH D08.811.682.657.163.843 – succinate-semialdehyde dehydrogenase
- MeSH D08.811.682.657.163.875 – succinate-semialdehyde dehydrogenase (nadp )
- MeSH D08.811.682.657.180 – formate dehydrogenases
- MeSH D08.811.682.657.350 – ketone oxidoreductases
- MeSH D08.811.682.657.350.750 – ketoglutarate dehydrogenase complex
- MeSH D08.811.682.657.350.750.500 – dihydrolipoamide dehydrogenase
- MeSH D08.811.682.657.350.760 – 3-methyl-2-oxobutanoate dehydrogenase (lipoamide)
- MeSH D08.811.682.657.350.825 – 2-oxoisovalerate dehydrogenase (acylating)
- MeSH D08.811.682.657.350.875 – pyruvate dehydrogenase (lipoamide)
- MeSH D08.811.682.657.350.937 – pyruvate oxidase
- MeSH D08.811.682.657.350.968 – pyruvate synthase
- MeSH D08.811.682.660 – oxidoreductases acting on ch-ch group donors
- MeSH D08.811.682.660.150 – acyl-coa dehydrogenases
- MeSH D08.811.682.660.150.100 – acyl-coa dehydrogenase
- MeSH D08.811.682.660.150.150 – acyl-coa dehydrogenase, long-chain
- MeSH D08.811.682.660.150.200 – acyl-coa oxidase
- MeSH D08.811.682.660.150.300 – butyryl-coa dehydrogenase
- MeSH D08.811.682.660.200 – cholestenone 5 alpha-reductase
- MeSH D08.811.682.660.250 – coproporphyrinogen oxidase
- MeSH D08.811.682.660.275 – dihydrodipicolinate reductase
- MeSH D08.811.682.660.300 – dihydroorotate oxidase
- MeSH D08.811.682.660.313 – dihydroorotate dehydrogenase
- MeSH D08.811.682.660.325 – dihydrouracil dehydrogenase (nad )
- MeSH D08.811.682.660.350 – dihydrouracil dehydrogenase (nadp)
- MeSH D08.811.682.660.385 – electron transport complex ii
- MeSH D08.811.682.660.385.500 – succinate dehydrogenase
- MeSH D08.811.682.660.387 – enoyl-(acyl-carrier-protein) reductase (nadh)
- MeSH D08.811.682.660.390 – enoyl-(acyl-carrier protein) reductase (nadph, b-specific)
- MeSH D08.811.682.660.425 – glutaryl-coa dehydrogenase
- MeSH D08.811.682.660.462 – isovaleryl-coa dehydrogenase
- MeSH D08.811.682.660.465 – 3-oxo-5-alpha-steroid 4-dehydrogenase
- MeSH D08.811.682.660.490 – 15-oxoprostaglandin 13-reductase
- MeSH D08.811.682.660.495 – lamin b receptor
- MeSH D08.811.682.660.500 – prephenate dehydrogenase
- MeSH D08.811.682.660.600 – protoporphyrinogen oxidase
- MeSH D08.811.682.662 – oxidoreductases acting on ch-nh group donors
- MeSH D08.811.682.662.171 – fmn reductase
- MeSH D08.811.682.662.194 – formyltetrahydrofolate dehydrogenase
- MeSH D08.811.682.662.217 – methylenetetrahydrofolate dehydrogenase (nad )
- MeSH D08.811.682.662.253 – methylenetetrahydrofolate dehydrogenase (nadp)
- MeSH D08.811.682.662.290 – methylenetetrahydrofolate reductase (nadph2)
- MeSH D08.811.682.662.436 – mu-crystallins
- MeSH D08.811.682.662.582 – oxidoreductases, n-demethylating
- MeSH D08.811.682.662.582.138 – alkb homolog 4, lysine demethylase
- MeSH D08.811.682.662.582.207 – alkb homolog 5, rna demethylase
- MeSH D08.811.682.662.582.242 – alpha-ketoglutarate-dependent dioxygenase fto
- MeSH D08.811.682.662.582.276 – aminopyrine n-demethylase
- MeSH D08.811.682.662.582.338 – cytochrome p-450 cyp2e1
- MeSH D08.811.682.662.582.353 – cytochrome p-450 cyp3a
- MeSH D08.811.682.662.582.361 – dihydropteridine reductase
- MeSH D08.811.682.662.582.369 – dimethylglycine dehydrogenase
- MeSH D08.811.682.662.582.400 – ethylmorphine-n-demethylase
- MeSH D08.811.682.662.582.475 – histone demethylases
- MeSH D08.811.682.662.582.475.500 – jumonji domain-containing histone demethylases
- MeSH D08.811.682.662.582.475.500.500 – retinoblastoma-binding protein 2
- MeSH D08.811.682.662.582.550 – sarcosine dehydrogenase
- MeSH D08.811.682.662.582.700 – sarcosine oxidase
- MeSH D08.811.682.662.611 – polyamine oxidase
- MeSH D08.811.682.662.640 – proline oxidase
- MeSH D08.811.682.662.680 – pyridoxaminephosphate oxidase
- MeSH D08.811.682.662.693 – 1-pyrroline-5-carboxylate dehydrogenase
- MeSH D08.811.682.662.695 – pyrroline carboxylate reductases
- MeSH D08.811.682.662.695.500 – delta-1-pyrroline-5-carboxylate reductase
- MeSH D08.811.682.662.750 – saccharopine dehydrogenases
- MeSH D08.811.682.662.825 – tetrahydrofolate dehydrogenase
- MeSH D08.811.682.664 – oxidoreductases acting on ch-nh2 group donors
- MeSH D08.811.682.664.249 – amine oxidase (copper-containing)
- MeSH D08.811.682.664.500 – amino acid oxidoreductases
- MeSH D08.811.682.664.500.062 – alanine dehydrogenase
- MeSH D08.811.682.664.500.125 – d-amino-acid oxidase
- MeSH D08.811.682.664.500.261 – d-aspartate oxidase
- MeSH D08.811.682.664.500.398 – glutamate dehydrogenase
- MeSH D08.811.682.664.500.410 – glutamate dehydrogenase (nadp )
- MeSH D08.811.682.664.500.470 – glutamate synthase
- MeSH D08.811.682.664.500.484 – glutamate synthase (nadh)
- MeSH D08.811.682.664.500.498 – glycine decarboxylase complex
- MeSH D08.811.682.664.500.498.500 – glycine dehydrogenase (decarboxylating)
- MeSH D08.811.682.664.500.526 – glycine dehydrogenase
- MeSH D08.811.682.664.500.677 – l-amino acid oxidase
- MeSH D08.811.682.664.500.724 – leucine dehydrogenase
- MeSH D08.811.682.664.500.772 – nitric oxide synthase
- MeSH D08.811.682.664.500.772.249 – nitric oxide synthase type i
- MeSH D08.811.682.664.500.772.500 – nitric oxide synthase type ii
- MeSH D08.811.682.664.500.772.750 – nitric oxide synthase type iii
- MeSH D08.811.682.664.500.810 – proline oxidase
- MeSH D08.811.682.664.500.848 – protein-lysine 6-oxidase
- MeSH D08.811.682.664.500.924 – valine dehydrogenase (nadp )
- MeSH D08.811.682.664.750 – monoamine oxidase
- MeSH D08.811.682.664.750.100 – benzylamine oxidase
- MeSH D08.811.682.667 – oxidoreductases acting on sulfur group donors
- MeSH D08.811.682.667.061 – dihydrolipoamide dehydrogenase
- MeSH D08.811.682.667.076 – ferredoxin-nadp reductase
- MeSH D08.811.682.667.084 – glutaredoxins
- MeSH D08.811.682.667.092 – glutathione reductase
- MeSH D08.811.682.667.124 – hydrogensulfite reductase
- MeSH D08.811.682.667.186 – protein disulfide reductase (glutathione)
- MeSH D08.811.682.667.217 – sulfite dehydrogenase
- MeSH D08.811.682.667.249 – sulfite oxidase
- MeSH D08.811.682.667.374 – sulfite reductase (ferredoxin)
- MeSH D08.811.682.667.500 – sulfite reductase (nadph)
- MeSH D08.811.682.667.750 – thioredoxin-disulfide reductase
- MeSH D08.811.682.667.750.500 – thioredoxin reductase 1
- MeSH D08.811.682.667.750.750 – thioredoxin reductase 2
- MeSH D08.811.682.670 – oxidoreductases, o-demethylating
- MeSH D08.811.682.670.550 – nitroanisole o-demethylase
- MeSH D08.811.682.690 – oxygenases
- MeSH D08.811.682.690.416 – dioxygenases
- MeSH D08.811.682.690.416.139 – alkb enzymes
- MeSH D08.811.682.690.416.139.500 – alkb homolog 1, histone h2a dioxygenase
- MeSH D08.811.682.690.416.139.750 – alkb homolog 2, alpha-ketoglutarate-dependent dioxygenase
- MeSH D08.811.682.690.416.139.875 – alkb homolog 3, alpha-ketoglutarate-dependent dioxygenase
- MeSH D08.811.682.690.416.139.937 – alkb homolog 4, lysine demethylase
- MeSH D08.811.682.690.416.139.968 – alkb homolog 5, rna demethylase
- MeSH D08.811.682.690.416.139.984 – alkb homolog 8, trna methyltransferase
- MeSH D08.811.682.690.416.139.992 – alpha-ketoglutarate-dependent dioxygenase fto
- MeSH D08.811.682.690.416.277 – catechol 1,2-dioxygenase
- MeSH D08.811.682.690.416.305 – catechol 2,3-dioxygenase
- MeSH D08.811.682.690.416.319 – cysteine dioxygenase
- MeSH D08.811.682.690.416.326 – homogentisate 1,2-dioxygenase
- MeSH D08.811.682.690.416.328 – 3-hydroxyanthranilate 3,4-dioxygenase
- MeSH D08.811.682.690.416.330 – 4-hydroxyphenylpyruvate dioxygenase
- MeSH D08.811.682.690.416.333 – indoleamine-pyrrole 2,3,-dioxygenase
- MeSH D08.811.682.690.416.388 – jumonji domain-containing histone demethylases
- MeSH D08.811.682.690.416.388.200 – retinoblastoma-binding protein 2
- MeSH D08.811.682.690.416.583 – lipoxygenases
- MeSH D08.811.682.690.416.583.500 – arachidonate lipoxygenases
- MeSH D08.811.682.690.416.583.500.055 – arachidonate 5-lipoxygenase
- MeSH D08.811.682.690.416.583.500.060 – arachidonate 12-lipoxygenase
- MeSH D08.811.682.690.416.583.500.065 – arachidonate 15-lipoxygenase
- MeSH D08.811.682.690.416.583.625 – lipoxygenase
- MeSH D08.811.682.690.416.617 – prolyl hydroxylases
- MeSH D08.811.682.690.416.617.500 – hypoxia-inducible factor-proline dioxygenases
- MeSH D08.811.682.690.416.617.750 – procollagen-proline dioxygenase
- MeSH D08.811.682.690.416.652 – protocatechuate-3,4-dioxygenase
- MeSH D08.811.682.690.416.722 – tryptophan oxygenase
- MeSH D08.811.682.690.562 – inositol oxygenase
- MeSH D08.811.682.690.708 – mixed function oxygenases
- MeSH D08.811.682.690.708.062 – benzoate 4-monooxygenase
- MeSH D08.811.682.690.708.125 – catechol oxidase
- MeSH D08.811.682.690.708.125.500 – monophenol monooxygenase
- MeSH D08.811.682.690.708.170 – cytochrome p-450 enzyme system
- MeSH D08.811.682.690.708.170.005 – cytochrome p-450 cyp2j2
- MeSH D08.811.682.690.708.170.010 – aryl hydrocarbon hydroxylases
- MeSH D08.811.682.690.708.170.010.024 – 7-alkoxycoumarin o-dealkylase
- MeSH D08.811.682.690.708.170.010.050 – aniline hydroxylase
- MeSH D08.811.682.690.708.170.010.110 – benzopyrene hydroxylase
- MeSH D08.811.682.690.708.170.010.277 – cytochrome p-450 cyp1a1
- MeSH D08.811.682.690.708.170.010.443 – cytochrome p-450 cyp1a2
- MeSH D08.811.682.690.708.170.010.500 – cytochrome p-450 cyp1b1
- MeSH D08.811.682.690.708.170.010.550 – cytochrome p-450 cyp2b1
- MeSH D08.811.682.690.708.170.010.575 – cytochrome p-450 cyp2b6
- MeSH D08.811.682.690.708.170.010.590 – cytochrome p-450 cyp2c8
- MeSH D08.811.682.690.708.170.010.600 – cytochrome p-450 cyp2d6
- MeSH D08.811.682.690.708.170.012 – camphor 5-monooxygenase
- MeSH D08.811.682.690.708.170.020 – cytochrome p450 family 1
- MeSH D08.811.682.690.708.170.020.500 – cytochrome p-450 cyp1a1
- MeSH D08.811.682.690.708.170.020.750 – cytochrome p-450 cyp1a2
- MeSH D08.811.682.690.708.170.020.875 – cytochrome p-450 cyp1b1
- MeSH D08.811.682.690.708.170.425 – cytochrome p450 family 11
- MeSH D08.811.682.690.708.170.425.250 – cholesterol side-chain cleavage enzyme
- MeSH D08.811.682.690.708.170.425.500 – cytochrome p-450 cyp11b2
- MeSH D08.811.682.690.708.170.425.750 – steroid 11-beta-hydroxylase
- MeSH D08.811.682.690.708.170.438 – cytochrome p450 family 12
- MeSH D08.811.682.690.708.170.444 – cytochrome p450 family 17
- MeSH D08.811.682.690.708.170.444.500 – steroid 17-alpha-hydroxylase
- MeSH D08.811.682.690.708.170.447 – cytochrome p450 family 19
- MeSH D08.811.682.690.708.170.447.500 – aromatase
- MeSH D08.811.682.690.708.170.450 – cytochrome p450 family 2
- MeSH D08.811.682.690.708.170.450.250 – cytochrome p-450 cyp2a6
- MeSH D08.811.682.690.708.170.450.313 – cytochrome p-450 cyp2b1
- MeSH D08.811.682.690.708.170.450.344 – cytochrome p-450 cyp2b6
- MeSH D08.811.682.690.708.170.450.360 – cytochrome p-450 cyp2c8
- MeSH D08.811.682.690.708.170.450.368 – cytochrome p-450 cyp2d6
- MeSH D08.811.682.690.708.170.450.375 – cytochrome p-450 cyp2e1
- MeSH D08.811.682.690.708.170.450.500 – limonene hydroxylases
- MeSH D08.811.682.690.708.170.450.500.500 – cytochrome p-450 cyp2c9
- MeSH D08.811.682.690.708.170.450.500.700 – cytochrome p-450 cyp2c19
- MeSH D08.811.682.690.708.170.450.500.500 – cytochrome p-450 cyp2c9
- MeSH D08.811.682.690.708.170.450.500.700 – cytochrome p-450 cyp2c19
- MeSH D08.811.682.690.708.170.463 – cytochrome p450 family 21
- MeSH D08.811.682.690.708.170.463.500 – steroid 21-hydroxylase
- MeSH D08.811.682.690.708.170.469 – cytochrome p450 family 24
- MeSH D08.811.682.690.708.170.469.500 – vitamin d3 24-hydroxylase
- MeSH D08.811.682.690.708.170.485 – cytochrome p450 family 26
- MeSH D08.811.682.690.708.170.485.500 – retinoic acid 4-hydroxylase
- MeSH D08.811.682.690.708.170.493 – cytochrome p450 family 27
- MeSH D08.811.682.690.708.170.493.500 – 25-hydroxyvitamin d3 1-alpha-hydroxylase
- MeSH D08.811.682.690.708.170.493.750 – cholestanetriol 26-monooxygenase
- MeSH D08.811.682.690.708.170.495 – cytochrome p450 family 3
- MeSH D08.811.682.690.708.170.495.500 – cytochrome p-450 cyp3a
- MeSH D08.811.682.690.708.170.496 – cytochrome p450 family 4
- MeSH D08.811.682.690.708.170.496.500 – cytochrome p-450 cyp4a
- MeSH D08.811.682.690.708.170.497 – cytochrome p450 family 46
- MeSH D08.811.682.690.708.170.497.500 – cholesterol 24-hydroxylase
- MeSH D08.811.682.690.708.170.499 – cytochrome p450 family 51
- MeSH D08.811.682.690.708.170.499.500 – sterol 14-demethylase
- MeSH D08.811.682.690.708.170.880 – cytochrome p450 family 6
- MeSH D08.811.682.690.708.170.890 – cytochrome p450 family 7
- MeSH D08.811.682.690.708.170.890.500 – cholesterol 7-alpha-hydroxylase
- MeSH D08.811.682.690.708.170.900 – cytochrome p450 family 8
- MeSH D08.811.682.690.708.170.900.500 – steroid 12-alpha-hydroxylase
- MeSH D08.811.682.690.708.170.915 – steroid hydroxylases
- MeSH D08.811.682.690.708.170.915.025 – cholesterol 24-hydroxylase
- MeSH D08.811.682.690.708.170.915.050 – cytochrome p-450 cyp11b2
- MeSH D08.811.682.690.708.170.915.099 – aromatase
- MeSH D08.811.682.690.708.170.915.150 – cholestanetriol 26-monooxygenase
- MeSH D08.811.682.690.708.170.915.200 – cholesterol 7-alpha-hydroxylase
- MeSH D08.811.682.690.708.170.915.212 – cholesterol side-chain cleavage enzyme
- MeSH D08.811.682.690.708.170.915.400 – 25-hydroxyvitamin d3 1-alpha-hydroxylase
- MeSH D08.811.682.690.708.170.915.730 – steroid 12-alpha-hydroxylase
- MeSH D08.811.682.690.708.170.915.737 – steroid 16-alpha-hydroxylase
- MeSH D08.811.682.690.708.170.915.748 – steroid 17-alpha-hydroxylase
- MeSH D08.811.682.690.708.170.915.750 – steroid 11-beta-hydroxylase
- MeSH D08.811.682.690.708.170.915.760 – steroid 21-hydroxylase
- MeSH D08.811.682.690.708.170.915.880 – sterol 14-demethylase
- MeSH D08.811.682.690.708.292 – dopamine beta-hydroxylase
- MeSH D08.811.682.690.708.392 – fatty acid desaturases
- MeSH D08.811.682.690.708.392.312 – beta-carotene 15,15'-monooxygenase
- MeSH D08.811.682.690.708.392.390 – delta-5 fatty acid desaturase
- MeSH D08.811.682.690.708.392.468 – linoleoyl-coa desaturase
- MeSH D08.811.682.690.708.392.625 – stearoyl-coa desaturase
- MeSH D08.811.682.690.708.401 – gamma-butyrobetaine dioxygenase
- MeSH D08.811.682.690.708.410 – heme oxygenase (decyclizing)
- MeSH D08.811.682.690.708.410.500 – heme oxygenase-1
- MeSH D08.811.682.690.708.425 – 4-hydroxybenzoate-3-monooxygenase
- MeSH D08.811.682.690.708.557 – kynurenine 3-monooxygenase
- MeSH D08.811.682.690.708.601 – phenylalanine hydroxylase
- MeSH D08.811.682.690.708.660 – procollagen-lysine, 2-oxoglutarate 5-dioxygenase
- MeSH D08.811.682.690.708.694 – prolyl hydroxylases
- MeSH D08.811.682.690.708.694.500 – hypoxia-inducible factor-proline dioxygenases
- MeSH D08.811.682.690.708.694.750 – procollagen-proline dioxygenase
- MeSH D08.811.682.690.708.715 – prostaglandin-endoperoxide synthases
- MeSH D08.811.682.690.708.749 – squalene monooxygenase
- MeSH D08.811.682.690.708.826 – trans-cinnamate 4-monooxygenase
- MeSH D08.811.682.690.708.870 – tryptophan hydroxylase
- MeSH D08.811.682.690.708.923 – tyrosine 3-monooxygenase
- MeSH D08.811.682.690.708.961 – vitamin k epoxide reductases
- MeSH D08.811.682.730 – methionine sulfoxide reductases
- MeSH D08.811.682.732 – peroxidases
- MeSH D08.811.682.732.165 – ascorbate peroxidases
- MeSH D08.811.682.732.332 – catalase
- MeSH D08.811.682.732.360 – chloride peroxidase
- MeSH D08.811.682.732.380 – cytochrome-c peroxidase
- MeSH D08.811.682.732.440 – eosinophil peroxidase
- MeSH D08.811.682.732.500 – glutathione peroxidase
- MeSH D08.811.682.732.500.500 – glutathione peroxidase gpx1
- MeSH D08.811.682.732.500.750 – phospholipid hydroperoxide glutathione peroxidase
- MeSH D08.811.682.732.512 – horseradish peroxidase
- MeSH D08.811.682.732.512.900 – wheat germ agglutinin-horseradish peroxidase conjugate
- MeSH D08.811.682.732.525 – iodide peroxidase
- MeSH D08.811.682.732.525.500 – iodothyronine deiodinase type ii
- MeSH D08.811.682.732.550 – lactoperoxidase
- MeSH D08.811.682.732.700 – peroxidase
- MeSH D08.811.682.732.700.500 – peroxidasin
- MeSH D08.811.682.732.850 – peroxiredoxins
- MeSH D08.811.682.732.850.249 – peroxiredoxin iii
- MeSH D08.811.682.732.850.500 – peroxiredoxin vi
- MeSH D08.811.682.732.962 – sestrins
- MeSH D08.811.682.771 – plastoquinol-plastocyanin reductase
- MeSH D08.811.682.810 – ribonucleotide reductases
- MeSH D08.811.682.810.567 – ribonucleoside diphosphate reductase
- MeSH D08.811.682.830 – succinate cytochrome c oxidoreductase
- MeSH D08.811.682.830.249 – electron transport complex ii
- MeSH D08.811.682.830.249.500 – succinate dehydrogenase
- MeSH D08.811.682.830.500 – electron transport complex iii
- MeSH D08.811.682.881 – superoxide dismutase
- MeSH D08.811.682.881.001 – superoxide dismutase 2
- MeSH D08.811.682.881.500 – superoxide dismutase-1
- MeSH D08.811.682.943 – urate oxidase

==== MeSH D08.811.739 – recombinases ====
- MeSH D08.811.739.250 – holliday junction resolvases
- MeSH D08.811.739.500 – integrases
- MeSH D08.811.739.500.667 – transposases
- MeSH D08.811.739.500.667.500 – hiv integrase
- MeSH D08.811.739.650 – rec a recombinases
- MeSH D08.811.739.650.500 – rad51 recombinase
- MeSH D08.811.739.800 – transposon resolvases
- MeSH D08.811.739.900 – vdj recombinases

==== MeSH D08.811.797 – rna, catalytic ====
- MeSH D08.811.797.500 – ribonuclease p
- MeSH D08.811.797.750 – rna, ribosomal, self-splicing

==== MeSH D08.811.913 – transferases ====
- MeSH D08.811.913.050 – acyltransferases
- MeSH D08.811.913.050.080 – acetyl-coa c-acyltransferase
- MeSH D08.811.913.050.080.249 – mitochondrial trifunctional protein
- MeSH D08.811.913.050.080.249.500 – mitochondrial trifunctional protein, beta subunit
- MeSH D08.811.913.050.134 – acetyltransferases
- MeSH D08.811.913.050.134.025 – acetyl-coa c-acetyltransferase
- MeSH D08.811.913.050.134.029 – acyl-carrier protein s-acetyltransferase
- MeSH D08.811.913.050.134.029.500 – fatty acid synthases
- MeSH D08.811.913.050.134.029.500.100 – fatty acid synthase, type i
- MeSH D08.811.913.050.134.029.500.200 – fatty acid synthase, type ii
- MeSH D08.811.913.050.134.105 – amino-acid n-acetyltransferase
- MeSH D08.811.913.050.134.127 – arylalkylamine n-acetyltransferase
- MeSH D08.811.913.050.134.138 – arylamine n-acetyltransferase
- MeSH D08.811.913.050.134.150 – carnitine o-acetyltransferase
- MeSH D08.811.913.050.134.170 – chloramphenicol o-acetyltransferase
- MeSH D08.811.913.050.134.180 – choline o-acetyltransferase
- MeSH D08.811.913.050.134.245 – diamine n-acetyltransferase
- MeSH D08.811.913.050.134.310 – dihydrolipoyllysine-residue acetyltransferase
- MeSH D08.811.913.050.134.343 – fatty acid elongases
- MeSH D08.811.913.050.134.375 – glucosamine 6-phosphate n-acetyltransferase
- MeSH D08.811.913.050.134.415 – lysine acetyltransferases
- MeSH D08.811.913.050.134.415.500 – histone acetyltransferases
- MeSH D08.811.913.050.134.415.500.049 – clock proteins
- MeSH D08.811.913.050.134.415.500.062 – lysine acetyltransferase 5
- MeSH D08.811.913.050.134.415.500.074 – n-terminal acetyltransferase d
- MeSH D08.811.913.050.134.415.500.100 – nuclear receptor coactivator 1
- MeSH D08.811.913.050.134.415.500.150 – nuclear receptor coactivator 3
- MeSH D08.811.913.050.134.415.500.575 – p300-cbp transcription factors
- MeSH D08.811.913.050.134.415.500.575.249 – creb-binding protein
- MeSH D08.811.913.050.134.415.500.575.600 – e1a-associated p300 protein
- MeSH D08.811.913.050.134.415.500.575.601 – p300-cbp-associated factor
- MeSH D08.811.913.050.134.415.500.575.249 – creb-binding protein
- MeSH D08.811.913.050.134.415.500.575.600 – e1a-associated p300 protein
- MeSH D08.811.913.050.134.415.500.575.601 – p300-cbp-associated factor
- MeSH D08.811.913.050.134.423 – n-terminal acetyltransferases
- MeSH D08.811.913.050.134.423.100 – n-terminal acetyltransferase a
- MeSH D08.811.913.050.134.423.200 – n-terminal acetyltransferase b
- MeSH D08.811.913.050.134.423.300 – n-terminal acetyltransferase c
- MeSH D08.811.913.050.134.423.400 – n-terminal acetyltransferase d
- MeSH D08.811.913.050.134.423.500 – n-terminal acetyltransferase e
- MeSH D08.811.913.050.134.423.600 – n-terminal acetyltransferase f
- MeSH D08.811.913.050.134.700 – phosphate acetyltransferase
- MeSH D08.811.913.050.134.850 – serine o-acetyltransferase
- MeSH D08.811.913.050.170 – acyl-carrier protein s-malonyltransferase
- MeSH D08.811.913.050.170.500 – fatty acid synthases
- MeSH D08.811.913.050.170.500.100 – fatty acid synthase, type i
- MeSH D08.811.913.050.170.500.200 – fatty acid synthase, type ii
- MeSH D08.811.913.050.173 – 1-acylglycerol-3-phosphate o-acyltransferase
- MeSH D08.811.913.050.175 – 1-acylglycerophosphocholine o-acyltransferase
- MeSH D08.811.913.050.200 – aminoacyltransferases
- MeSH D08.811.913.050.200.400 – gamma-glutamylcyclotransferase
- MeSH D08.811.913.050.200.500 – gamma-glutamyltransferase
- MeSH D08.811.913.050.200.700 – peptidyl transferases
- MeSH D08.811.913.050.200.800 – transglutaminases
- MeSH D08.811.913.050.200.800.300 – factor xiiia
- MeSH D08.811.913.050.200.800.650 – protein glutamine gamma glutamyltransferase 2
- MeSH D08.811.913.050.276 – 5-aminolevulinate synthetase
- MeSH D08.811.913.050.331 – atp citrate (pro-s)-lyase
- MeSH D08.811.913.050.350 – carnitine acyltransferases
- MeSH D08.811.913.050.350.170 – carnitine o-acetyltransferase
- MeSH D08.811.913.050.350.200 – carnitine o-palmitoyltransferase
- MeSH D08.811.913.050.368 – citrate (si)-synthase
- MeSH D08.811.913.050.387 – diacylglycerol o-acyltransferase
- MeSH D08.811.913.050.425 – glycerol-3-phosphate o-acyltransferase
- MeSH D08.811.913.050.600 – homoserine o-succinyltransferase
- MeSH D08.811.913.050.612 – hydroxymethylglutaryl-coa synthase
- MeSH D08.811.913.050.614 – 2-isopropylmalate synthase
- MeSH D08.811.913.050.618 – malate synthase
- MeSH D08.811.913.050.622 – 3-oxoacyl-(acyl-carrier-protein) synthase
- MeSH D08.811.913.050.625 – phosphatidylcholine-sterol o-acyltransferase
- MeSH D08.811.913.050.646 – retinol o-fatty-acyltransferase
- MeSH D08.811.913.050.668 – serine c-palmitoyltransferase
- MeSH D08.811.913.050.712 – sphingosine n-acyltransferase
- MeSH D08.811.913.050.799 – sterol o-acyltransferase
- MeSH D08.811.913.050.799.500 – sterol o-acyltransferase 2
- MeSH D08.811.913.200 – aldehyde-ketone transferases
- MeSH D08.811.913.200.324 – acetolactate synthase
- MeSH D08.811.913.200.650 – transaldolase
- MeSH D08.811.913.200.825 – transketolase
- MeSH D08.811.913.225 – alkyl and aryl transferases
- MeSH D08.811.913.225.224 – cysteine synthase
- MeSH D08.811.913.225.250 – 3-deoxy-7-phosphoheptulonate synthase
- MeSH D08.811.913.225.300 – dihydropteroate synthase
- MeSH D08.811.913.225.400 – dimethylallyltranstransferase
- MeSH D08.811.913.225.431 – farnesyl-diphosphate farnesyltransferase
- MeSH D08.811.913.225.437 – farnesyltranstransferase
- MeSH D08.811.913.225.443 – geranylgeranyl-diphosphate geranylgeranyltransferase
- MeSH D08.811.913.225.450 – geranyltranstransferase
- MeSH D08.811.913.225.500 – glutathione transferase
- MeSH D08.811.913.225.500.500 – glutathione s-transferase pi
- MeSH D08.811.913.225.575 – hydroxymethylbilane synthase
- MeSH D08.811.913.225.650 – methionine adenosyltransferase
- MeSH D08.811.913.225.735 – 3-phosphoshikimate 1-carboxyvinyltransferase
- MeSH D08.811.913.225.750 – riboflavin synthase
- MeSH D08.811.913.225.825 – spermidine synthase
- MeSH D08.811.913.225.912 – spermine synthase
- MeSH D08.811.913.400 – glycosyltransferases
- MeSH D08.811.913.400.001 – exostosin glycosyltransferase family
- MeSH D08.811.913.400.001.250 – exostosin 1
- MeSH D08.811.913.400.001.300 – exostosin 2
- MeSH D08.811.913.400.100 – n-acetylhexosaminyltransferases
- MeSH D08.811.913.400.100.200 – n-acetylgalactosaminyltransferases
- MeSH D08.811.913.400.100.200.300 – fucosyl galactose alpha-n-acetylgalactosaminyltransferase
- MeSH D08.811.913.400.100.200.650 – polypeptide n-acetylgalactosaminyltransferase
- MeSH D08.811.913.400.100.250 – n-acetylglucosaminyltransferases
- MeSH D08.811.913.400.100.250.250 – exostosin 1
- MeSH D08.811.913.400.100.250.300 – exostosin 2
- MeSH D08.811.913.400.450 – hexosyltransferases
- MeSH D08.811.913.400.450.300 – fucosyltransferases
- MeSH D08.811.913.400.450.300.500 – galactoside 2-alpha-l-fucosyltransferase
- MeSH D08.811.913.400.450.400 – galactosyltransferases
- MeSH D08.811.913.400.450.400.450 – beta-n-acetylglucosaminylglycopeptide beta-1,4-galactosyltransferase
- MeSH D08.811.913.400.450.400.460 – n-acylsphingosine galactosyltransferase
- MeSH D08.811.913.400.450.400.475 – ganglioside galactosyltransferase
- MeSH D08.811.913.400.450.400.500 – lactose synthase
- MeSH D08.811.913.400.450.400.500.100 – n-acetyllactosamine synthase
- MeSH D08.811.913.400.450.460 – glucosyltransferases
- MeSH D08.811.913.400.450.460.100 – 1,4-alpha-glucan branching enzyme
- MeSH D08.811.913.400.450.460.200 – chitin synthase
- MeSH D08.811.913.400.450.460.350 – glycogen debranching enzyme system
- MeSH D08.811.913.400.450.460.375 – glycogen synthase
- MeSH D08.811.913.400.450.460.400 – phosphorylases
- MeSH D08.811.913.400.450.460.400.186 – glycogen phosphorylase
- MeSH D08.811.913.400.450.460.400.186.061 – glycogen phosphorylase, brain form
- MeSH D08.811.913.400.450.460.400.186.124 – glycogen phosphorylase, liver form
- MeSH D08.811.913.400.450.460.400.186.312 – glycogen phosphorylase, muscle form
- MeSH D08.811.913.400.450.460.400.186.061 – glycogen phosphorylase, brain form
- MeSH D08.811.913.400.450.460.400.186.124 – glycogen phosphorylase, liver form
- MeSH D08.811.913.400.450.460.400.186.312 – glycogen phosphorylase, muscle form
- MeSH D08.811.913.400.450.460.400.280 – phosphorylase a
- MeSH D08.811.913.400.450.460.400.327 – phosphorylase b
- MeSH D08.811.913.400.450.460.400.374 – starch phosphorylase
- MeSH D08.811.913.400.450.460.750 – starch synthase
- MeSH D08.811.913.400.450.480 – glucuronosyltransferase
- MeSH D08.811.913.400.450.480.500 – hyaluronan synthases
- MeSH D08.811.913.400.450.480.750 – udp-glucuronosyltransferase 1a9
- MeSH D08.811.913.400.450.480.751 – ugt1a1 enzyme
- MeSH D08.811.913.400.450.560 – mannosyltransferases
- MeSH D08.811.913.400.450.780 – peptidoglycan glycosyltransferase
- MeSH D08.811.913.400.725 – pentosyltransferases
- MeSH D08.811.913.400.725.100 – adenine phosphoribosyltransferase
- MeSH D08.811.913.400.725.115 – adp ribose transferases
- MeSH D08.811.913.400.725.115.180 – cholera toxin
- MeSH D08.811.913.400.725.115.220 – diphtheria toxin
- MeSH D08.811.913.400.725.115.660 – nad nucleosidase
- MeSH D08.811.913.400.725.115.660.060 – adp-ribosyl cyclase
- MeSH D08.811.913.400.725.115.680 – pertussis toxin
- MeSH D08.811.913.400.725.115.690 – poly(adp-ribose) polymerases
- MeSH D08.811.913.400.725.115.690.420 – poly (adp-ribose) polymerase-1
- MeSH D08.811.913.400.725.115.690.840 – tankyrases
- MeSH D08.811.913.400.725.115.826 – pseudomonas aeruginosa exotoxin a
- MeSH D08.811.913.400.725.115.961 – sirtuins
- MeSH D08.811.913.400.725.115.961.200 – sirtuin 2
- MeSH D08.811.913.400.725.115.961.600 – sirtuin 3
- MeSH D08.811.913.400.725.130 – amidophosphoribosyltransferase
- MeSH D08.811.913.400.725.160 – anthranilate phosphoribosyltransferase
- MeSH D08.811.913.400.725.200 – atp phosphoribosyltransferase
- MeSH D08.811.913.400.725.450 – hypoxanthine phosphoribosyltransferase
- MeSH D08.811.913.400.725.575 – nicotinamide phosphoribosyltransferase
- MeSH D08.811.913.400.725.638 – nicotinate-nucleotide diphosphorylase (carboxylating)
- MeSH D08.811.913.400.725.700 – orotate phosphoribosyltransferase
- MeSH D08.811.913.400.725.800 – purine-nucleoside phosphorylase
- MeSH D08.811.913.400.725.850 – pyrimidine phosphorylases
- MeSH D08.811.913.400.725.850.500 – thymidine phosphorylase
- MeSH D08.811.913.400.725.850.750 – uridine phosphorylase
- MeSH D08.811.913.400.725.925 – udp xylose-protein xylosyltransferase
- MeSH D08.811.913.400.800 – sialyltransferases
- MeSH D08.811.913.400.800.250 – beta-d-galactoside alpha 2-6-sialyltransferase
- MeSH D08.811.913.400.800.500 – beta-galactoside alpha-2,3-sialyltransferase
- MeSH D08.811.913.477 – nitrogenous group transferases
- MeSH D08.811.913.477.700 – transaminases
- MeSH D08.811.913.477.700.100 – alanine transaminase
- MeSH D08.811.913.477.700.120 – 2-aminoadipate transaminase
- MeSH D08.811.913.477.700.200 – 4-aminobutyrate transaminase
- MeSH D08.811.913.477.700.225 – aspartate aminotransferases
- MeSH D08.811.913.477.700.225.249 – aspartate aminotransferase, cytoplasmic
- MeSH D08.811.913.477.700.225.500 – aspartate aminotransferase, mitochondrial
- MeSH D08.811.913.477.700.286 – beta-alanine-pyruvate transaminase
- MeSH D08.811.913.477.700.347 – d-alanine transaminase
- MeSH D08.811.913.477.700.470 – glutamate synthase
- MeSH D08.811.913.477.700.500 – glutamine-fructose-6-phosphate transaminase (isomerizing)
- MeSH D08.811.913.477.700.525 – glycine transaminase
- MeSH D08.811.913.477.700.535 – leucine transaminase
- MeSH D08.811.913.477.700.550 – l-lysine 6-transaminase
- MeSH D08.811.913.477.700.700 – ornithine-oxo-acid transaminase
- MeSH D08.811.913.477.700.800 – succinyldiaminopimelate transaminase
- MeSH D08.811.913.477.700.850 – tryptophan transaminase
- MeSH D08.811.913.477.700.900 – tyrosine transaminase
- MeSH D08.811.913.555 – one-carbon group transferases
- MeSH D08.811.913.555.150 – amidinotransferases
- MeSH D08.811.913.555.275 – carboxyl and carbamoyl transferases
- MeSH D08.811.913.555.275.200 – aspartate carbamoyltransferase
- MeSH D08.811.913.555.275.600 – ornithine carbamoyltransferase
- MeSH D08.811.913.555.400 – hydroxymethyl and formyl transferases
- MeSH D08.811.913.555.400.100 – aminomethyltransferase
- MeSH D08.811.913.555.400.300 – glutamate formimidoyltransferase
- MeSH D08.811.913.555.400.500 – glycine hydroxymethyltransferase
- MeSH D08.811.913.555.400.625 – phosphoribosylaminoimidazolecarboxamide formyltransferase
- MeSH D08.811.913.555.400.750 – phosphoribosylglycinamide formyltransferase
- MeSH D08.811.913.555.500 – methyltransferases
- MeSH D08.811.913.555.500.100 – acetylserotonin o-methyltransferase
- MeSH D08.811.913.555.500.175 – betaine-homocysteine s-methyltransferase
- MeSH D08.811.913.555.500.250 – catechol o-methyltransferase
- MeSH D08.811.913.555.500.350 – dna modification methylases
- MeSH D08.811.913.555.500.350.100 – dna-cytosine methylases
- MeSH D08.811.913.555.500.350.100.500 – dna (cytosine-5-)-methyltransferases
- MeSH D08.811.913.555.500.350.100.500.500 – dna (cytosine-5-)-methyltransferase 1
- MeSH D08.811.913.555.500.350.100.500.625 – dna methyltransferase 3b
- MeSH D08.811.913.555.500.350.100.500.750 – dna methyltransferase 3a
- MeSH D08.811.913.555.500.350.100.500.500 – dna (cytosine-5-)-methyltransferase 1
- MeSH D08.811.913.555.500.350.100.500.625 – dna methyltransferase 3b
- MeSH D08.811.913.555.500.350.100.500.750 – dna methyltransferase 3a
- MeSH D08.811.913.555.500.350.100.750 – site-specific dna-methyltransferase (cytosine-n4-specific)
- MeSH D08.811.913.555.500.350.700 – site-specific dna-methyltransferase (adenine-specific)
- MeSH D08.811.913.555.500.387 – glycine n-methyltransferase
- MeSH D08.811.913.555.500.425 – guanidinoacetate n-methyltransferase
- MeSH D08.811.913.555.500.500 – histamine n-methyltransferase
- MeSH D08.811.913.555.500.625 – homocysteine s-methyltransferase
- MeSH D08.811.913.555.500.645 – 5-methyltetrahydrofolate-homocysteine s-methyltransferase
- MeSH D08.811.913.555.500.650 – nicotinamide n-methyltransferase
- MeSH D08.811.913.555.500.700 – phenylethanolamine n-methyltransferase
- MeSH D08.811.913.555.500.710 – phosphatidyl-n-methylethanolamine n-methyltransferase
- MeSH D08.811.913.555.500.712 – phosphatidylethanolamine n-methyltransferase
- MeSH D08.811.913.555.500.800 – protein methyltransferases
- MeSH D08.811.913.555.500.800.200 – histone methyltransferases
- MeSH D08.811.913.555.500.800.200.500 – histone-lysine n-methyltransferase
- MeSH D08.811.913.555.500.800.200.500.500 – polycomb repressive complex 2
- MeSH D08.811.913.555.500.800.200.500.500.500 – enhancer of zeste homolog 2 protein
- MeSH D08.811.913.555.500.800.200.500.500 – polycomb repressive complex 2
- MeSH D08.811.913.555.500.800.200.500.500.500 – enhancer of zeste homolog 2 protein
- MeSH D08.811.913.555.500.800.650 – o(6)-methylguanine-dna methyltransferase
- MeSH D08.811.913.555.500.800.700 – positive regulatory domain i-binding factor 1
- MeSH D08.811.913.555.500.800.750 – protein-arginine n-methyltransferases
- MeSH D08.811.913.555.500.800.800 – protein o-methyltransferase
- MeSH D08.811.913.555.500.800.800.700 – protein d-aspartate-l-isoaspartate methyltransferase
- MeSH D08.811.913.555.500.862 – thymidylate synthase
- MeSH D08.811.913.555.500.925 – trna methyltransferases
- MeSH D08.811.913.555.500.925.500 – alkb homolog 8, trna methyltransferase
- MeSH D08.811.913.696 – phosphotransferases
- MeSH D08.811.913.696.175 – diphosphotransferases
- MeSH D08.811.913.696.175.300 – gtp pyrophosphokinase
- MeSH D08.811.913.696.175.650 – ribose-phosphate pyrophosphokinase
- MeSH D08.811.913.696.175.825 – thiamin pyrophosphokinase
- MeSH D08.811.913.696.310 – myosin type iii
- MeSH D08.811.913.696.445 – nucleotidyltransferases
- MeSH D08.811.913.696.445.018 – mrna guanylyltransferases
- MeSH D08.811.913.696.445.035 – n-acylneuraminate cytidylyltransferase
- MeSH D08.811.913.696.445.184 – choline-phosphate cytidylyltransferase
- MeSH D08.811.913.696.445.246 – cyclic guanosine monophosphate-adenosine monophosphate synthase
- MeSH D08.811.913.696.445.308 – dna nucleotidyltransferases
- MeSH D08.811.913.696.445.308.300 – dna-directed dna polymerase
- MeSH D08.811.913.696.445.308.300.112 – dna polymerase beta
- MeSH D08.811.913.696.445.308.300.169 – dna polymerase gamma
- MeSH D08.811.913.696.445.308.300.225 – dna polymerase i
- MeSH D08.811.913.696.445.308.300.230 – dna polymerase ii
- MeSH D08.811.913.696.445.308.300.235 – dna polymerase iii
- MeSH D08.811.913.696.445.308.300.622 – dna polymerase theta
- MeSH D08.811.913.696.445.308.300.750 – rna-directed dna polymerase
- MeSH D08.811.913.696.445.308.300.750.187 – hiv reverse transcriptase
- MeSH D08.811.913.696.445.308.300.750.750 – telomerase
- MeSH D08.811.913.696.445.308.300.750.187 – hiv reverse transcriptase
- MeSH D08.811.913.696.445.308.300.750.750 – telomerase
- MeSH D08.811.913.696.445.308.300.813 – replisomes
- MeSH D08.811.913.696.445.308.300.875 – taq polymerase
- MeSH D08.811.913.696.445.308.300.876 – y-family dna polymerases
- MeSH D08.811.913.696.445.308.300.876.001 – dna polymerase iota
- MeSH D08.811.913.696.445.308.300.876.001 – dna polymerase iota
- MeSH D08.811.913.696.445.308.325 – dna nucleotidylexotransferase
- MeSH D08.811.913.696.445.400 – glucose-1-phosphate adenylyltransferase
- MeSH D08.811.913.696.445.600 – nicotinamide-nucleotide adenylyltransferase
- MeSH D08.811.913.696.445.625 – 2',5'-oligoadenylate synthetase
- MeSH D08.811.913.696.445.650 – polynucleotide adenylyltransferase
- MeSH D08.811.913.696.445.692 – rec a recombinases
- MeSH D08.811.913.696.445.735 – rna nucleotidyltransferases
- MeSH D08.811.913.696.445.735.265 – dna, catalytic
- MeSH D08.811.913.696.445.735.270 – dna-directed rna polymerases
- MeSH D08.811.913.696.445.735.270.375 – dna primase
- MeSH D08.811.913.696.445.735.270.750 – rna polymerase i
- MeSH D08.811.913.696.445.735.270.762 – rna polymerase ii
- MeSH D08.811.913.696.445.735.270.775 – rna polymerase iii
- MeSH D08.811.913.696.445.735.270.887 – rna polymerase sigma 54
- MeSH D08.811.913.696.445.735.532 – polyribonucleotide nucleotidyltransferase
- MeSH D08.811.913.696.445.735.630 – q beta replicase
- MeSH D08.811.913.696.445.735.720 – rna helicases
- MeSH D08.811.913.696.445.735.720.249 – dead-box rna helicases
- MeSH D08.811.913.696.445.735.720.249.500 – dead box protein 20
- MeSH D08.811.913.696.445.735.720.249.750 – dead box protein 58
- MeSH D08.811.913.696.445.735.720.249.875 – interferon-induced helicase, ifih1
- MeSH D08.811.913.696.445.735.720.249.500 – dead box protein 20
- MeSH D08.811.913.696.445.735.720.249.750 – dead box protein 58
- MeSH D08.811.913.696.445.735.720.249.875 – interferon-induced helicase, ifih1
- MeSH D08.811.913.696.445.735.720.500 – eukaryotic initiation factor-4a
- MeSH D08.811.913.696.445.735.780 – rna-dependent rna polymerase
- MeSH D08.811.913.696.445.735.780.500 – coronavirus rna-dependent rna polymerase
- MeSH D08.811.913.696.445.735.917 – rna, ribosomal, self-splicing
- MeSH D08.811.913.696.445.800 – sulfate adenylyltransferase
- MeSH D08.811.913.696.445.825 – transposases
- MeSH D08.811.913.696.445.825.500 – hiv integrase
- MeSH D08.811.913.696.445.837 – transposon resolvases
- MeSH D08.811.913.696.445.850 – udpglucose-hexose-1-phosphate uridylyltransferase
- MeSH D08.811.913.696.445.875 – utp-glucose-1-phosphate uridylyltransferase
- MeSH D08.811.913.696.445.900 – utp-hexose-1-phosphate uridylyltransferase
- MeSH D08.811.913.696.445.950 – vdj recombinases
- MeSH D08.811.913.696.620 – phosphotransferases (alcohol group acceptor)
- MeSH D08.811.913.696.620.010 – adenosine kinase
- MeSH D08.811.913.696.620.155 – choline kinase
- MeSH D08.811.913.696.620.175 – deoxycytidine kinase
- MeSH D08.811.913.696.620.200 – diacylglycerol kinase
- MeSH D08.811.913.696.620.225 – fructokinases
- MeSH D08.811.913.696.620.225.850 – phosphofructokinases
- MeSH D08.811.913.696.620.225.850.500 – phosphofructokinase-1
- MeSH D08.811.913.696.620.225.850.500.249 – phosphofructokinase-1, liver type
- MeSH D08.811.913.696.620.225.850.500.500 – phosphofructokinase-1, muscle type
- MeSH D08.811.913.696.620.225.850.500.750 – phosphofructokinase-1, type c
- MeSH D08.811.913.696.620.225.850.500.249 – phosphofructokinase-1, liver type
- MeSH D08.811.913.696.620.225.850.500.500 – phosphofructokinase-1, muscle type
- MeSH D08.811.913.696.620.225.850.500.750 – phosphofructokinase-1, type c
- MeSH D08.811.913.696.620.225.850.750 – phosphofructokinase-2
- MeSH D08.811.913.696.620.240 – galactokinase
- MeSH D08.811.913.696.620.250 – glucokinase
- MeSH D08.811.913.696.620.275 – glycerol kinase
- MeSH D08.811.913.696.620.300 – hexokinase
- MeSH D08.811.913.696.620.475 – kanamycin kinase
- MeSH D08.811.913.696.620.500 – phosphatidylinositol 3-kinases
- MeSH D08.811.913.696.620.500.100 – phosphatidylinositol 3-kinase
- MeSH D08.811.913.696.620.500.100.100 – class i phosphatidylinositol 3-kinases
- MeSH D08.811.913.696.620.500.100.100.100 – class ia phosphatidylinositol 3-kinase
- MeSH D08.811.913.696.620.500.100.100.200 – class ib phosphatidylinositol 3-kinase
- MeSH D08.811.913.696.620.500.100.100.100 – class ia phosphatidylinositol 3-kinase
- MeSH D08.811.913.696.620.500.100.100.200 – class ib phosphatidylinositol 3-kinase
- MeSH D08.811.913.696.620.500.100.200 – class ii phosphatidylinositol 3-kinases
- MeSH D08.811.913.696.620.500.100.300 – class iii phosphatidylinositol 3-kinases
- MeSH D08.811.913.696.620.500.100.300.500 – vacuolar sorting protein vps15
- MeSH D08.811.913.696.620.500.100.300.500 – vacuolar sorting protein vps15
- MeSH D08.811.913.696.620.500.200 – phosphatidylinositol-4-phosphate 3-kinase
- MeSH D08.811.913.696.620.500.200.100 – class i phosphatidylinositol 3-kinases
- MeSH D08.811.913.696.620.500.200.100.100 – class ia phosphatidylinositol 3-kinase
- MeSH D08.811.913.696.620.500.200.100.200 – class ib phosphatidylinositol 3-kinase
- MeSH D08.811.913.696.620.500.200.100.100 – class ia phosphatidylinositol 3-kinase
- MeSH D08.811.913.696.620.500.200.100.200 – class ib phosphatidylinositol 3-kinase
- MeSH D08.811.913.696.620.500.200.200 – class ii phosphatidylinositol 3-kinases
- MeSH D08.811.913.696.620.550 – 1-phosphatidylinositol 4-kinase
- MeSH D08.811.913.696.620.650 – phosphoenolpyruvate sugar phosphotransferase system
- MeSH D08.811.913.696.620.680 – polynucleotide 5'-hydroxyl-kinase
- MeSH D08.811.913.696.620.682 – protein kinases
- MeSH D08.811.913.696.620.682.324 – connectin
- MeSH D08.811.913.696.620.682.424 – histidine kinase
- MeSH D08.811.913.696.620.682.650 – phosphorylase kinase
- MeSH D08.811.913.696.620.682.700 – protein serine-threonine kinases
- MeSH D08.811.913.696.620.682.700.062 – activin receptors
- MeSH D08.811.913.696.620.682.700.062.500 – activin receptors, type i
- MeSH D08.811.913.696.620.682.700.062.750 – activin receptors, type ii
- MeSH D08.811.913.696.620.682.700.074 – amp-activated protein kinase kinases
- MeSH D08.811.913.696.620.682.700.085 – amp-activated protein kinases
- MeSH D08.811.913.696.620.682.700.097 – ataxia telangiectasia mutated proteins
- MeSH D08.811.913.696.620.682.700.103 – aurora kinases
- MeSH D08.811.913.696.620.682.700.103.500 – aurora kinase a
- MeSH D08.811.913.696.620.682.700.103.750 – aurora kinase b
- MeSH D08.811.913.696.620.682.700.103.875 – aurora kinase c
- MeSH D08.811.913.696.620.682.700.108 – autophagy-related protein-1 homolog
- MeSH D08.811.913.696.620.682.700.109 – bone morphogenetic protein receptors
- MeSH D08.811.913.696.620.682.700.109.500 – bone morphogenetic protein receptors, type i
- MeSH D08.811.913.696.620.682.700.109.750 – bone morphogenetic protein receptors, type ii
- MeSH D08.811.913.696.620.682.700.125 – calcium-calmodulin-dependent protein kinases
- MeSH D08.811.913.696.620.682.700.125.049 – calcium-calmodulin-dependent protein kinase kinase
- MeSH D08.811.913.696.620.682.700.125.100 – calcium-calmodulin-dependent protein kinase type 1
- MeSH D08.811.913.696.620.682.700.125.200 – calcium-calmodulin-dependent protein kinase type 2
- MeSH D08.811.913.696.620.682.700.125.350 – calcium-calmodulin-dependent protein kinase type 4
- MeSH D08.811.913.696.620.682.700.125.387 – death-associated protein kinases
- MeSH D08.811.913.696.620.682.700.125.425 – elongation factor 2 kinase
- MeSH D08.811.913.696.620.682.700.125.500 – myosin-light-chain kinase
- MeSH D08.811.913.696.620.682.700.140 – casein kinases
- MeSH D08.811.913.696.620.682.700.140.300 – casein kinase i
- MeSH D08.811.913.696.620.682.700.140.300.100 – casein kinase ialpha
- MeSH D08.811.913.696.620.682.700.140.300.200 – casein kinase idelta
- MeSH D08.811.913.696.620.682.700.140.300.300 – casein kinase 1 epsilon
- MeSH D08.811.913.696.620.682.700.140.600 – casein kinase ii
- MeSH D08.811.913.696.620.682.700.143 – checkpoint kinase 1
- MeSH D08.811.913.696.620.682.700.145 – checkpoint kinase 2
- MeSH D08.811.913.696.620.682.700.150 – cyclic nucleotide-regulated protein kinases
- MeSH D08.811.913.696.620.682.700.150.125 – cyclic amp-dependent protein kinases
- MeSH D08.811.913.696.620.682.700.150.125.750 – cyclic amp-dependent protein kinase type i
- MeSH D08.811.913.696.620.682.700.150.125.750.500 – cyclic amp-dependent protein kinase catalytic subunits
- MeSH D08.811.913.696.620.682.700.150.125.750.625 – cyclic amp-dependent protein kinase rialpha subunit
- MeSH D08.811.913.696.620.682.700.150.125.750.750 – cyclic amp-dependent protein kinase ribeta subunit
- MeSH D08.811.913.696.620.682.700.150.125.875 – cyclic amp-dependent protein kinase type ii
- MeSH D08.811.913.696.620.682.700.150.125.875.500 – cyclic amp-dependent protein kinase catalytic subunits
- MeSH D08.811.913.696.620.682.700.150.125.875.750 – cyclic amp-dependent protein kinase riialpha subunit
- MeSH D08.811.913.696.620.682.700.150.125.875.875 – cyclic amp-dependent protein kinase riibeta subunit
- MeSH D08.811.913.696.620.682.700.150.150 – cyclic gmp-dependent protein kinases
- MeSH D08.811.913.696.620.682.700.150.150.500 – cyclic gmp-dependent protein kinase type i
- MeSH D08.811.913.696.620.682.700.150.150.750 – cyclic gmp-dependent protein kinase type ii
- MeSH D08.811.913.696.620.682.700.150.575 – protamine kinase
- MeSH D08.811.913.696.620.682.700.250 – dna-activated protein kinase
- MeSH D08.811.913.696.620.682.700.275 – doublecortin-like kinases
- MeSH D08.811.913.696.620.682.700.288 – dyrk kinases
- MeSH D08.811.913.696.620.682.700.294 – hippo kinases
- MeSH D08.811.913.696.620.682.700.300 – eif-2 kinase
- MeSH D08.811.913.696.620.682.700.364 – g-protein-coupled receptor kinases
- MeSH D08.811.913.696.620.682.700.364.049 – beta-adrenergic receptor kinases
- MeSH D08.811.913.696.620.682.700.364.049.200 – g-protein-coupled receptor kinase 2
- MeSH D08.811.913.696.620.682.700.364.049.300 – g-protein-coupled receptor kinase 3
- MeSH D08.811.913.696.620.682.700.364.100 – g-protein-coupled receptor kinase 1
- MeSH D08.811.913.696.620.682.700.364.550 – g-protein-coupled receptor kinase 4
- MeSH D08.811.913.696.620.682.700.364.775 – g-protein-coupled receptor kinase 5
- MeSH D08.811.913.696.620.682.700.397 – germinal center kinases
- MeSH D08.811.913.696.620.682.700.429 – glycogen synthase kinases
- MeSH D08.811.913.696.620.682.700.429.500 – glycogen synthase kinase 3
- MeSH D08.811.913.696.620.682.700.429.500.500 – glycogen synthase kinase 3 beta
- MeSH D08.811.913.696.620.682.700.494 – i-kappa b kinase
- MeSH D08.811.913.696.620.682.700.526 – interleukin-1 receptor-associated kinases
- MeSH D08.811.913.696.620.682.700.534 – leucine-rich repeat serine-threonine protein kinase-2
- MeSH D08.811.913.696.620.682.700.542 – lim kinases
- MeSH D08.811.913.696.620.682.700.550 – map-kinase-activated kinase 2
- MeSH D08.811.913.696.620.682.700.559 – map kinase kinase kinases
- MeSH D08.811.913.696.620.682.700.559.100 – map kinase kinase kinase 1
- MeSH D08.811.913.696.620.682.700.559.200 – map kinase kinase kinase 2
- MeSH D08.811.913.696.620.682.700.559.300 – map kinase kinase kinase 3
- MeSH D08.811.913.696.620.682.700.559.400 – map kinase kinase kinase 4
- MeSH D08.811.913.696.620.682.700.559.500 – map kinase kinase kinase 5
- MeSH D08.811.913.696.620.682.700.559.575 – map kinase kinase kinase 7
- MeSH D08.811.913.696.620.682.700.559.650 – mitogen-activated protein kinase kinase kinase 11
- MeSH D08.811.913.696.620.682.700.559.800 – proto-oncogene proteins c-mos
- MeSH D08.811.913.696.620.682.700.559.842 – raf kinases
- MeSH D08.811.913.696.620.682.700.559.842.249 – oncogene proteins v-raf
- MeSH D08.811.913.696.620.682.700.559.842.374 – proto-oncogene proteins b-raf
- MeSH D08.811.913.696.620.682.700.559.842.500 – proto-oncogene proteins c-raf
- MeSH D08.811.913.696.620.682.700.565 – mitogen-activated protein kinase kinases
- MeSH D08.811.913.696.620.682.700.565.100 – map kinase kinase 1
- MeSH D08.811.913.696.620.682.700.565.200 – map kinase kinase 2
- MeSH D08.811.913.696.620.682.700.565.300 – map kinase kinase 3
- MeSH D08.811.913.696.620.682.700.565.400 – map kinase kinase 4
- MeSH D08.811.913.696.620.682.700.565.500 – map kinase kinase 5
- MeSH D08.811.913.696.620.682.700.565.600 – map kinase kinase 6
- MeSH D08.811.913.696.620.682.700.565.700 – map kinase kinase 7
- MeSH D08.811.913.696.620.682.700.567 – mitogen-activated protein kinases
- MeSH D08.811.913.696.620.682.700.567.249 – extracellular signal-regulated map kinases
- MeSH D08.811.913.696.620.682.700.567.249.500 – mitogen-activated protein kinase 1
- MeSH D08.811.913.696.620.682.700.567.249.750 – mitogen-activated protein kinase 3
- MeSH D08.811.913.696.620.682.700.567.249.875 – mitogen-activated protein kinase 6
- MeSH D08.811.913.696.620.682.700.567.249.937 – mitogen-activated protein kinase 7
- MeSH D08.811.913.696.620.682.700.567.374 – jnk mitogen-activated protein kinases
- MeSH D08.811.913.696.620.682.700.567.374.500 – mitogen-activated protein kinase 8
- MeSH D08.811.913.696.620.682.700.567.374.750 – mitogen-activated protein kinase 9
- MeSH D08.811.913.696.620.682.700.567.374.800 – mitogen-activated protein kinase 10
- MeSH D08.811.913.696.620.682.700.567.843 – p38 mitogen-activated protein kinases
- MeSH D08.811.913.696.620.682.700.567.843.500 – mitogen-activated protein kinase 11
- MeSH D08.811.913.696.620.682.700.567.843.750 – mitogen-activated protein kinase 12
- MeSH D08.811.913.696.620.682.700.567.843.875 – mitogen-activated protein kinase 13
- MeSH D08.811.913.696.620.682.700.567.843.937 – mitogen-activated protein kinase 14
- MeSH D08.811.913.696.620.682.700.576 – myotonin-protein kinase
- MeSH D08.811.913.696.620.682.700.579 – nf-kappab-inducing kinase
- MeSH D08.811.913.696.620.682.700.581 – nima-related kinases
- MeSH D08.811.913.696.620.682.700.581.500 – nima-related kinase 1
- MeSH D08.811.913.696.620.682.700.586 – oncogene protein v-akt
- MeSH D08.811.913.696.620.682.700.596 – p21-activated kinases
- MeSH D08.811.913.696.620.682.700.606 – phytochrome a
- MeSH D08.811.913.696.620.682.700.616 – polo-like kinases
- MeSH D08.811.913.696.620.682.700.616.500 – polo-like kinase 1
- MeSH D08.811.913.696.620.682.700.626 – positive transcriptional elongation factor b
- MeSH D08.811.913.696.620.682.700.646 – proline-directed protein kinases
- MeSH D08.811.913.696.620.682.700.646.500 – cyclin-dependent kinases
- MeSH D08.811.913.696.620.682.700.646.500.500 – cdc2-cdc28 kinases
- MeSH D08.811.913.696.620.682.700.646.500.500.250 – cdc2 protein kinase
- MeSH D08.811.913.696.620.682.700.646.500.500.375 – cdc28 protein kinase, s cerevisiae
- MeSH D08.811.913.696.620.682.700.646.500.500.500 – cyclin-dependent kinase 5
- MeSH D08.811.913.696.620.682.700.646.500.500.750 – cyclin-dependent kinase 9
- MeSH D08.811.913.696.620.682.700.646.500.750 – cyclin-dependent kinase 2
- MeSH D08.811.913.696.620.682.700.646.500.812 – cyclin-dependent kinase 3
- MeSH D08.811.913.696.620.682.700.646.500.875 – cyclin-dependent kinase 4
- MeSH D08.811.913.696.620.682.700.646.500.937 – cyclin-dependent kinase 6
- MeSH D08.811.913.696.620.682.700.646.500.968 – cyclin-dependent kinase 8
- MeSH D08.811.913.696.620.682.700.646.500.984 – maturation-promoting factor
- MeSH D08.811.913.696.620.682.700.646.500.984.500 – cdc2 protein kinase
- MeSH D08.811.913.696.620.682.700.646.500.992 – cyclin-dependent kinase-activating kinase
- MeSH D08.811.913.696.620.682.700.646.625 – glycogen synthase kinase 3
- MeSH D08.811.913.696.620.682.700.646.625.500 – glycogen synthase kinase 3 beta
- MeSH D08.811.913.696.620.682.700.725 – protein kinase c
- MeSH D08.811.913.696.620.682.700.725.001 – protein kinase c zeta
- MeSH D08.811.913.696.620.682.700.725.002 – protein kinase c-lambda
- MeSH D08.811.913.696.620.682.700.725.049 – protein kinase c beta
- MeSH D08.811.913.696.620.682.700.725.075 – protein kinase c-theta
- MeSH D08.811.913.696.620.682.700.725.100 – protein kinase c-alpha
- MeSH D08.811.913.696.620.682.700.725.400 – protein kinase c-delta
- MeSH D08.811.913.696.620.682.700.725.750 – protein kinase c-epsilon
- MeSH D08.811.913.696.620.682.700.745 – 3-phosphoinositide-dependent protein kinases
- MeSH D08.811.913.696.620.682.700.750 – protein kinase d2
- MeSH D08.811.913.696.620.682.700.755 – proto-oncogene proteins c-akt
- MeSH D08.811.913.696.620.682.700.759 – proto-oncogene proteins c-bcr
- MeSH D08.811.913.696.620.682.700.776 – proto-oncogene proteins c-pim-1
- MeSH D08.811.913.696.620.682.700.780 – pten-induced putative kinase
- MeSH D08.811.913.696.620.682.700.783 – pyruvate dehydrogenase acetyl-transferring kinase
- MeSH D08.811.913.696.620.682.700.789 – receptor, transforming growth factor-beta type i
- MeSH D08.811.913.696.620.682.700.795 – receptor, transforming growth factor-beta type ii
- MeSH D08.811.913.696.620.682.700.801 – receptor-interacting protein serine-threonine kinases
- MeSH D08.811.913.696.620.682.700.801.500 – receptor-interacting protein serine-threonine kinase 2
- MeSH D08.811.913.696.620.682.700.814 – rho-associated kinases
- MeSH D08.811.913.696.620.682.700.862 – ribosomal protein s6 kinases
- MeSH D08.811.913.696.620.682.700.862.249 – ribosomal protein s6 kinases, 70-kda
- MeSH D08.811.913.696.620.682.700.862.500 – ribosomal protein s6 kinases, 90-kda
- MeSH D08.811.913.696.620.682.700.897 – serine-threonine kinase 3
- MeSH D08.811.913.696.620.682.700.900 – serum-glucocorticoid regulated kinases
- MeSH D08.811.913.696.620.682.700.931 – tor serine-threonine kinases
- MeSH D08.811.913.696.620.682.700.931.500 – mechanistic target of rapamycin complex 1
- MeSH D08.811.913.696.620.682.700.931.500.250 – mtor associated protein, lst8 homolog
- MeSH D08.811.913.696.620.682.700.931.500.500 – regulatory-associated protein of mtor
- MeSH D08.811.913.696.620.682.700.931.750 – mechanistic target of rapamycin complex 2
- MeSH D08.811.913.696.620.682.700.931.750.500 – rapamycin-insensitive companion of mtor protein
- MeSH D08.811.913.696.620.682.700.965 – vacuolar sorting protein vps15
- MeSH D08.811.913.696.620.682.700.982 – wnk lysine-deficient protein kinase 1
- MeSH D08.811.913.696.620.682.725 – protein-tyrosine kinases
- MeSH D08.811.913.696.620.682.725.025 – agammaglobulinaemia tyrosine kinase
- MeSH D08.811.913.696.620.682.725.037 – dyrk kinases
- MeSH D08.811.913.696.620.682.725.049 – focal adhesion protein-tyrosine kinases
- MeSH D08.811.913.696.620.682.725.049.500 – focal adhesion kinase 1
- MeSH D08.811.913.696.620.682.725.049.750 – focal adhesion kinase 2
- MeSH D08.811.913.696.620.682.725.124 – janus kinases
- MeSH D08.811.913.696.620.682.725.124.100 – janus kinase 1
- MeSH D08.811.913.696.620.682.725.124.200 – janus kinase 2
- MeSH D08.811.913.696.620.682.725.124.300 – janus kinase 3
- MeSH D08.811.913.696.620.682.725.124.650 – tyk2 kinase
- MeSH D08.811.913.696.620.682.725.200 – mitogen-activated protein kinase kinases
- MeSH D08.811.913.696.620.682.725.200.100 – map kinase kinase 1
- MeSH D08.811.913.696.620.682.725.200.200 – map kinase kinase 2
- MeSH D08.811.913.696.620.682.725.200.300 – map kinase kinase 3
- MeSH D08.811.913.696.620.682.725.200.400 – map kinase kinase 4
- MeSH D08.811.913.696.620.682.725.200.500 – map kinase kinase 5
- MeSH D08.811.913.696.620.682.725.200.600 – map kinase kinase 6
- MeSH D08.811.913.696.620.682.725.200.700 – map kinase kinase 7
- MeSH D08.811.913.696.620.682.725.300 – proto-oncogene proteins c-fes
- MeSH D08.811.913.696.620.682.725.400 – receptor protein-tyrosine kinases
- MeSH D08.811.913.696.620.682.725.400.002 – anaplastic lymphoma kinase
- MeSH D08.811.913.696.620.682.725.400.003 – c-mer tyrosine kinase
- MeSH D08.811.913.696.620.682.725.400.005 – discoidin domain receptors
- MeSH D08.811.913.696.620.682.725.400.005.500 – discoidin domain receptor 1
- MeSH D08.811.913.696.620.682.725.400.005.750 – discoidin domain receptor 2
- MeSH D08.811.913.696.620.682.725.400.009 – erbb receptors
- MeSH D08.811.913.696.620.682.725.400.009.400 – erb-b2 receptor tyrosine kinases
- MeSH D08.811.913.696.620.682.725.400.009.500 – receptor, erbb-3
- MeSH D08.811.913.696.620.682.725.400.009.600 – receptor, erbb-4
- MeSH D08.811.913.696.620.682.725.400.020 – fms-like tyrosine kinase 3
- MeSH D08.811.913.696.620.682.725.400.050 – proto-oncogene proteins c-kit
- MeSH D08.811.913.696.620.682.725.400.075 – proto-oncogene proteins c-met
- MeSH D08.811.913.696.620.682.725.400.087 – proto-oncogene proteins c-ret
- MeSH D08.811.913.696.620.682.725.400.093 – receptor tyrosine kinase-like orphan receptors
- MeSH D08.811.913.696.620.682.725.400.177 – receptor, fibroblast growth factor, type 1
- MeSH D08.811.913.696.620.682.725.400.178 – receptor, fibroblast growth factor, type 2
- MeSH D08.811.913.696.620.682.725.400.179 – receptor, fibroblast growth factor, type 3
- MeSH D08.811.913.696.620.682.725.400.180 – receptor, fibroblast growth factor, type 4
- MeSH D08.811.913.696.620.682.725.400.185 – receptor, igf type 1
- MeSH D08.811.913.696.620.682.725.400.200 – receptor, insulin
- MeSH D08.811.913.696.620.682.725.400.500 – receptor, macrophage colony-stimulating factor
- MeSH D08.811.913.696.620.682.725.400.660 – receptor, trka
- MeSH D08.811.913.696.620.682.725.400.700 – receptor, trkb
- MeSH D08.811.913.696.620.682.725.400.800 – receptor, trkc
- MeSH D08.811.913.696.620.682.725.400.850 – receptors, eph family
- MeSH D08.811.913.696.620.682.725.400.850.050 – receptor, epha1
- MeSH D08.811.913.696.620.682.725.400.850.100 – receptor, epha2
- MeSH D08.811.913.696.620.682.725.400.850.150 – receptor, epha3
- MeSH D08.811.913.696.620.682.725.400.850.200 – receptor, epha4
- MeSH D08.811.913.696.620.682.725.400.850.250 – receptor, epha5
- MeSH D08.811.913.696.620.682.725.400.850.300 – receptor, epha6
- MeSH D08.811.913.696.620.682.725.400.850.400 – receptor, epha7
- MeSH D08.811.913.696.620.682.725.400.850.500 – receptor, epha8
- MeSH D08.811.913.696.620.682.725.400.850.600 – receptor, ephb1
- MeSH D08.811.913.696.620.682.725.400.850.650 – receptor, ephb2
- MeSH D08.811.913.696.620.682.725.400.850.700 – receptor, ephb3
- MeSH D08.811.913.696.620.682.725.400.850.750 – receptor, ephb4
- MeSH D08.811.913.696.620.682.725.400.850.800 – receptor, ephb5
- MeSH D08.811.913.696.620.682.725.400.900 – receptors, platelet-derived growth factor
- MeSH D08.811.913.696.620.682.725.400.900.500 – receptor, platelet-derived growth factor alpha
- MeSH D08.811.913.696.620.682.725.400.900.750 – receptor, platelet-derived growth factor beta
- MeSH D08.811.913.696.620.682.725.400.925 – receptors, tie
- MeSH D08.811.913.696.620.682.725.400.925.249 – receptor, tie-1
- MeSH D08.811.913.696.620.682.725.400.925.500 – receptor, tie-2
- MeSH D08.811.913.696.620.682.725.400.950 – receptors, vascular endothelial growth factor
- MeSH D08.811.913.696.620.682.725.400.950.100 – vascular endothelial growth factor receptor-1
- MeSH D08.811.913.696.620.682.725.400.950.200 – vascular endothelial growth factor receptor-2
- MeSH D08.811.913.696.620.682.725.400.950.300 – vascular endothelial growth factor receptor-3
- MeSH D08.811.913.696.620.682.725.400.975 – axl receptor tyrosine kinase
- MeSH D08.811.913.696.620.682.725.500 – proto-oncogene proteins c-abl
- MeSH D08.811.913.696.620.682.725.500.500 – fusion proteins, bcr-abl
- MeSH D08.811.913.696.620.682.725.650 – syk kinase
- MeSH D08.811.913.696.620.682.725.800 – src-family kinases
- MeSH D08.811.913.696.620.682.725.800.158 – csk tyrosine-protein kinase
- MeSH D08.811.913.696.620.682.725.800.315 – lymphocyte specific protein tyrosine kinase p56(lck)
- MeSH D08.811.913.696.620.682.725.800.472 – oncogene protein pp60(v-src)
- MeSH D08.811.913.696.620.682.725.800.551 – proto-oncogene proteins c-fyn
- MeSH D08.811.913.696.620.682.725.800.590 – proto-oncogene proteins c-hck
- MeSH D08.811.913.696.620.682.725.800.610 – proto-oncogene proteins c-yes
- MeSH D08.811.913.696.620.682.725.800.630 – proto-oncogene proteins pp60(c-src)
- MeSH D08.811.913.696.620.682.725.900 – zap-70 protein-tyrosine kinase
- MeSH D08.811.913.696.620.685 – pyridoxal kinase
- MeSH D08.811.913.696.620.695 – pyruvate kinase
- MeSH D08.811.913.696.620.723 – sphingosine kinase
- MeSH D08.811.913.696.620.750 – thymidine kinase
- MeSH D08.811.913.696.620.800 – uridine kinase
- MeSH D08.811.913.696.630 – phosphotransferases (carboxyl group acceptor)
- MeSH D08.811.913.696.630.025 – acetate kinase
- MeSH D08.811.913.696.630.050 – aspartate kinase
- MeSH D08.811.913.696.630.050.050 – aspartokinase homoserine dehydrogenase
- MeSH D08.811.913.696.630.700 – phosphoglycerate kinase
- MeSH D08.811.913.696.640 – phosphotransferases (nitrogenous group acceptor)
- MeSH D08.811.913.696.640.025 – arginine kinase
- MeSH D08.811.913.696.640.150 – creatine kinase
- MeSH D08.811.913.696.640.150.500 – creatine kinase, bb form
- MeSH D08.811.913.696.640.150.625 – creatine kinase, mb form
- MeSH D08.811.913.696.640.150.750 – creatine kinase, mitochondrial form
- MeSH D08.811.913.696.640.150.875 – creatine kinase, mm form
- MeSH D08.811.913.696.645 – phosphotransferases (paired acceptors)
- MeSH D08.811.913.696.645.700 – pyruvate, orthophosphate dikinase
- MeSH D08.811.913.696.650 – phosphotransferases (phosphate group acceptor)
- MeSH D08.811.913.696.650.025 – adenylate kinase
- MeSH D08.811.913.696.650.150 – atp synthetase complexes
- MeSH D08.811.913.696.650.150.500 – proton-translocating atpases
- MeSH D08.811.913.696.650.150.500.249 – bacterial proton-translocating atpases
- MeSH D08.811.913.696.650.150.500.500 – chloroplast proton-translocating atpases
- MeSH D08.811.913.696.650.150.500.750 – mitochondrial proton-translocating atpases
- MeSH D08.811.913.696.650.150.500.813 – prorenin receptor
- MeSH D08.811.913.696.650.150.500.875 – vacuolar proton-translocating atpases
- MeSH D08.811.913.696.650.450 – guanylate kinases
- MeSH D08.811.913.696.650.450.500 – discs large homolog 1 protein
- MeSH D08.811.913.696.650.450.750 – disks large homolog 4 protein
- MeSH D08.811.913.696.650.550 – nucleoside-diphosphate kinase
- MeSH D08.811.913.696.650.550.200 – nm23 nucleoside diphosphate kinases
- MeSH D08.811.913.696.650.550.200.500 – nucleoside diphosphate kinase d
- MeSH D08.811.913.696.650.575 – nucleoside-phosphate kinase
- MeSH D08.811.913.696.900 – transferases (other substituted phosphate groups)
- MeSH D08.811.913.696.900.074 – cdp-diacylglycerol-inositol 3-phosphatidyltransferase
- MeSH D08.811.913.696.900.150 – cdpdiacylglycerol-serine o-phosphatidyltransferase
- MeSH D08.811.913.696.900.200 – diacylglycerol cholinephosphotransferase
- MeSH D08.811.913.696.900.250 – ethanolaminephosphotransferase
- MeSH D08.811.913.817 – sulfur group transferases
- MeSH D08.811.913.817.200 – coenzyme a-transferases
- MeSH D08.811.913.817.400 – sulfotransferases
- MeSH D08.811.913.817.400.300 – arylsulfotransferase
- MeSH D08.811.913.817.400.650 – carbohydrate sulfotransferases
- MeSH D08.811.913.817.500 – sulfurtransferases
- MeSH D08.811.913.817.500.500 – thiosulfate sulfurtransferase

The list continues at List of MeSH codes (D09).
