= LRP1 =

Mammalian protein found in Homo sapiens

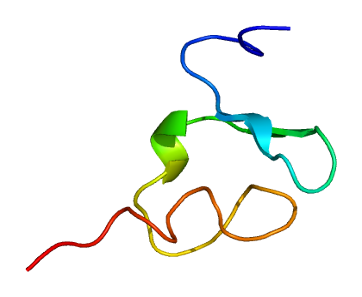

Identifiers
- Aliases: LRP1, A2MR, APOER, APR, CD91, IGFBP3R, LRP, LRP1A, TGFBR5, low density lipoprotein receptor-related protein 1, LDL receptor related protein 1, KPA, IGFBP3R1, IGFBP-3R
- External IDs: OMIM: 107770; MGI: 96828; GeneCards: LRP1
Available structures
PDB	Ortholog search: PDBe RCSB
PDB	List of PDB id codes 1CR8, 1D2L, 1J8E, 2FYJ, 2FYL, 2KNX, 2KNY

Gene location (Human)
Chr.	Chromosome 12 (human)
Band	12q13.3	Start	57,128,483 bp
Band	12q13.3	End	57,213,361 bp

Gene location (Mouse)
Chr.	Chromosome 10 (mouse)
Band	10|10 D3	Start	127,374,030 bp
Band	10|10 D3	End	127,457,017 bp
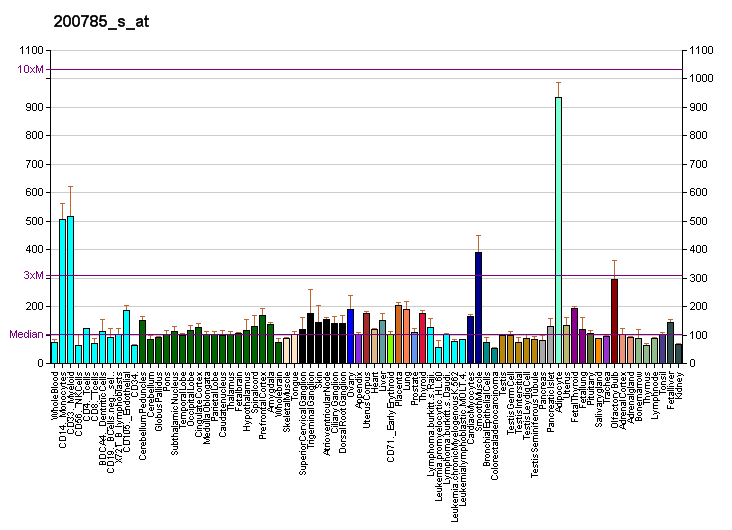

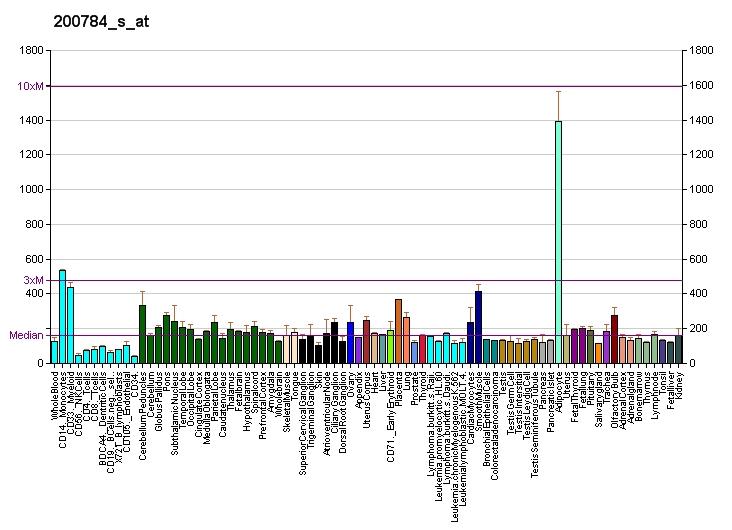
RNA expression pattern
Bgee	Human / Mouse (ortholog); Top expressed in: stromal cell of endometrium; Descending thoracic aorta; ascending aorta; right ovary; left ovary; right coronary artery; tibial nerve; canal of the cervix; sural nerve; left coronary artery / Top expressed in: stroma of bone marrow; superior frontal gyrus; internal carotid artery; external carotid artery; ankle; primary visual cortex; lip; choroid plexus of fourth ventricle; cerebellar cortex; perirhinal cortex; More reference expression data
BioGPS	More reference expression data
Gene ontology
Molecular function	calcium ion binding; apolipoprotein binding; lipoprotein particle receptor binding; protein-containing complex binding; metal ion binding; protease binding; protein binding; low-density lipoprotein particle receptor activity; RNA binding; amyloid-beta binding; scavenger receptor activity; coreceptor activity; alpha-2 macroglobulin receptor activity; apolipoprotein receptor activity; clathrin heavy chain binding; signaling receptor activity; cargo receptor activity; heparan sulfate proteoglycan binding
Cellular component	integral component of membrane; endocytic vesicle membrane; endosome; membrane; focal adhesion; receptor complex; plasma membrane; integral component of plasma membrane; lysosomal membrane; soma; dendrite; nucleolus; clathrin-coated pit; clathrin-coated vesicle; nucleus; cytoplasm; cytosol; early endosome; basolateral plasma membrane; insulin-responsive compartment; axonal growth cone; apical part of cell; plasma membrane protein complex
Biological process	lipoprotein metabolic process; negative regulation of neuron apoptotic process; negative regulation of platelet-derived growth factor receptor-beta signaling pathway; negative regulation of neuron projection development; endocytosis; regulation of actin cytoskeleton organization; regulation of phospholipase A2 activity; amyloid-beta clearance; negative regulation of Wnt signaling pathway; ageing; negative regulation of smooth muscle cell migration; positive regulation of lipid transport; receptor-mediated endocytosis; aorta morphogenesis; retinoid metabolic process; regulation of cholesterol transport; positive regulation of protein transport; apoptotic cell clearance; multicellular organism development; protein kinase C-activating G protein-coupled receptor signaling pathway; positive regulation of cholesterol efflux; cerebral cortex development; cell population proliferation; lipoprotein transport; regulation of extracellular matrix disassembly; astrocyte activation involved in immune response; lipid metabolism; phagocytosis; positive regulation of cytosolic calcium ion concentration; negative regulation of cell-substrate adhesion; positive regulation of cell death; positive regulation of neuron projection development; receptor internalization; positive regulation of protein binding; positive regulation of insulin secretion involved in cellular response to glucose stimulus; negative regulation of apoptotic process; cellular lipid catabolic process; transcytosis; positive regulation of axon extension; positive regulation of endocytosis; positive regulation of axon extension involved in regeneration; positive regulation of collateral sprouting of injured axon; positive regulation of phagocytosis; negative regulation of cytosolic calcium ion concentration; negative regulation of focal adhesion assembly; negative regulation of cell death; chemoattraction of axon; positive regulation of ERK1 and ERK2 cascade; amyloid-beta clearance by transcytosis; amyloid-beta clearance by cellular catabolic process; positive regulation of Schwann cell migration; positive regulation of amyloid-beta clearance; positive regulation of protein localization to plasma membrane; positive regulation of cholesterol import; cellular response to amyloid-beta; positive regulation of vascular associated smooth muscle cell migration; positive regulation of lysosomal protein catabolic process; lysosomal transport
Sources:Amigo / QuickGO
Orthologs
Databases	NCBI: entry; OMA: entry
Species	Human	Mouse
Entrez	4035	16971
Ensembl	ENSG00000123384	ENSMUSG00000040249
UniProt	Q07954	Q91ZX7
RefSeq (mRNA)	NM_002332	NM_008512
RefSeq (protein)	NP_002323	NP_032538
Location (UCSC)	Chr 12: 57.13 – 57.21 Mb	Chr 10: 127.37 – 127.46 Mb
PubMed search
- Wikidata
View/Edit Human	View/Edit Mouse

Low density lipoprotein receptor-related protein 1 (LRP1), also known as alpha-2-macroglobulin receptor (A2MR), apolipoprotein E receptor (APOER) or cluster of differentiation 91 (CD91), is a protein forming a receptor found in the plasma membrane of cells involved in receptor-mediated endocytosis. In humans, the LRP1 protein is encoded by the LRP1 gene. LRP1 is also a key signalling protein and, thus, involved in various biological processes, such as lipoprotein metabolism and cell motility, and diseases, such as neurodegenerative diseases, atherosclerosis, and cancer.

== Structure ==
The LRP1 gene encodes a 600 kDa precursor protein that is processed by furin in the trans-Golgi complex, resulting in a 515 kDa alpha-chain and an 85 kDa beta-chain associated noncovalently. As a member of the LDLR family, LRP1 contains cysteine-rich complement-type repeats, EGF (gene) repeats, β-propeller domains, a transmembrane domain, and a cytoplasmic domain. The extracellular domain of LRP1 is the alpha-chain, which comprises four ligand-binding domains (numbered I-IV) containing two, eight, ten, and eleven cysteine-rich complement-type repeats, respectively. These repeats bind extracellular matrix proteins, growth factors, proteases, protease inhibitor complexes, and other proteins involved in lipoprotein metabolism. Of the four domains, II and IV bind the majority of the protein's ligands. The EGF repeats and β-propeller domains serve to release ligands in low pH conditions, such as inside endosomes, with the β-propeller postulated to displace the ligand at the ligand binding repeats. The transmembrane domain is the β-chain, which contains a 100-residue cytoplasmic tail. This tail contains two NPxY motifs that are responsible for the protein's function in endocytosis and signal transduction.

== Function ==
LRP1 is a member of the LDLR family and ubiquitously expressed in multiple tissues, though it is most abundant in vascular smooth muscle cells (SMCs), hepatocytes, and neurons. LRP1 plays a key role in intracellular signaling and endocytosis, which implicates it in many cellular and biological processes, including lipid and lipoprotein metabolism, protease degradation, platelet derived growth factor receptor regulation, integrin maturation and recycling, regulation of vascular tone, regulation of blood brain barrier permeability, cell growth, cell migration, inflammation, and apoptosis, as well as diseases such as neurodegenerative diseases, atherosclerosis, and cancer. To elaborate, LRP1 mainly contributes to regulate protein activity by binding target proteins as a co-receptor, in conjunction with integral membrane proteins or adaptor proteins like uPA, to the lysosome for degradation. In lipoprotein metabolism, the interaction between LRP1 and APOE stimulates a signaling pathway that leads to elevated intracellular cAMP levels, increased protein kinase A activity, inhibited SMC migration, and ultimately, protection against vascular disease. While membrane-bound LRP1 performs endocytic clearance of proteases and inhibitors, proteolytic cleavage of its ectodomain allows the free LRP1 to compete with the membrane-bound form and prevent their clearance. Several sheddases have been implicated in the proteolytic cleavage of LRP1 such as ADAM10, ADAM12, ADAM17 and MT1-MMP. LRP1 is also continuously endocytosed from the membrane and recycled back to the cell surface. Though the role of LRP1 in apoptosis is unclear, it is required for tPA to bind LRP1 in order to trigger the ERK1/2 signal cascade and promote cell survival.

== Clinical significance ==
=== Alzheimer's disease ===
Neurons require cholesterol to function. Cholesterol is imported into the neuron by apolipoprotein E (apoE) via LRP1 receptors on the cell surface. It has been theorized that a causal factor in Alzheimer's is the decrease of LRP1 mediated by the metabolism of the amyloid precursor protein, leading to decreased neuronal cholesterol and increased amyloid beta.

LRP1 is also implicated in the effective clearance of Aβ from the brain to the periphery across the blood-brain barrier. LRP1 mediates pathways that interact with astrocytes and pericytes, which are associated with the blood-brain barrier. In support of this, LRP1 expression is reduced in endothelial cells as a result of normal aging and Alzheimer's disease in humans and animal models of the disease. This clearance mechanism is modulated by the apoE isoforms, with the presence of the apoE4 isoform resulting in reduced transcytosis of Aβ in in-vitro models of the blood-brain barrier. The reduced clearance appears to be, at least in part, as a result of an increase in the ectodomain shedding of LRP1 by sheddases, resulting in the formation of soluble LRP1 which is no longer able to transcytose the Aβ peptides.

In addition, over-accumulation of copper in the brain is associated with reduced LRP1 mediated clearance of amyloid beta across the blood brain barrier. This defective clearance may contribute to the buildup of neurotoxic amyloid-beta that is thought to contribute to Alzheimer's disease.

=== Cardiovascular disease ===
Studies have elucidated different roles for LRP1 in cellular processes relevant for cardiovascular disease. Atherosclerosis is the primary cause of cardiovascular disease such as stroke and heart attacks. In the liver LRP1 is important for the removal of atherogenic lipoproteins (Chylomicron remnants, VLDL) and other proatherogenic ligands from the circulation. LRP1 has a cholesterol-independent role in atherosclerosis by modulating the activity and cellular localization of the PDGFR-β in vascular smooth muscle cells. Finally, LRP1 in macrophages has an effect on atherosclerosis through the modulation of the extracellular matrix and inflammatory responses. A 2026 analysis of human transcriptomic datasets found that LRP1 expression was highest in the aorta, followed by the coronary and tibial arteries, and was approximately twice as high in atrial tissue as in the left ventricle. Expression was generally stable with age except in the tibial artery, while sex differences among vascular tissues were detected only in the aorta. Single-cell data showed prominent expression in fibroblasts, macrophages, adipocytes, with moderate expression in smooth muscle cells.

=== Cancer ===
LRP1 is involved in tumorigenesis, and is proposed to be a tumor suppressor. Notably, LRP1 functions in clearing proteases such as plasmin, urokinase-type plasminogen activator, and metalloproteinases, which contributes to prevention of cancer invasion, while its absence is linked to increased cancer invasion. However, the exact mechanisms require further study, as other studies have shown that LRP1 may also promote cancer invasion. One possible mechanism for the inhibitory function of LRP1 in cancer involves the LRP1-dependent endocytosis of 2′-hydroxycinnamaldehyde (HCA), resulting in decreased pepsin levels and, consequently, tumor progression. Alternatively, LRP1 may regulate focal adhesion disassembly of cancer cells through the ERK and JNK pathways to aid invasion. Moreover, LRP1 interacts with PAI-1 to recruit mast cells (MCs) and induce their degranulation, resulting in the release of MC mediators, activation of an inflammatory response, and development of glioma.

== Interactions ==
LRP1 has been shown to interact with:

- A2-Macroglobulin,
- β-amyloid precursor protein,
- APBB1,
- APOE,
- Aprotinin,
- C1S/C1q inhibitor,
- CALR,
- CD44,
- Chylomicron,
- Circumsporozoite protein,
- Collectin,
- Complement C3,
- CTGF,
- DLG4,
- Elastase,
- Factor IXa,
- Factor VIIa,
- Fibronectin,
- Gentamicin,
- GIPC1,
- Heat shock proteins: gp96, hsp70, hsp90,
- heparin cofactor II,
- Hepatic lipase,
- ITGB1BP1,
- Lactoferrin,
- Lipoprotein lipase,
- LPL,
- MAPK8IP1,
- MAPK8IP2,
- Midkine,
- MMP13,
- MMP2,
- MMP9,
- Neuroserpin,
- Nexin-1,
- NOS1AP,
- PAI 2,
- PAI-1,
- PDGF,
- tPA,
- uPA,
- Polymyxin B,
- Protein C inhibitor,
- Pseudomonas exotoxin A,
- RAP,
- Ricin A,
- SHC1, and
- Sphingolipid activator protein,
- SYNJ2BP.
- Tat,
- Thrombin,
- THBS1,
- Thrombospondin 2,
- TIMP1,
- TIMP2,
- TIMP3,
- Tissue factor pathway inhibitor,
- PLAT,
- Transforming growth factor-β,
- PLAUR,
- VLDL,

=== Interactive pathway map ===
Click on genes, proteins and metabolites below to link to respective articles. (Note: The interactive pathway map can be edited at WikiPathways: "Statin_Pathway_WP430".)

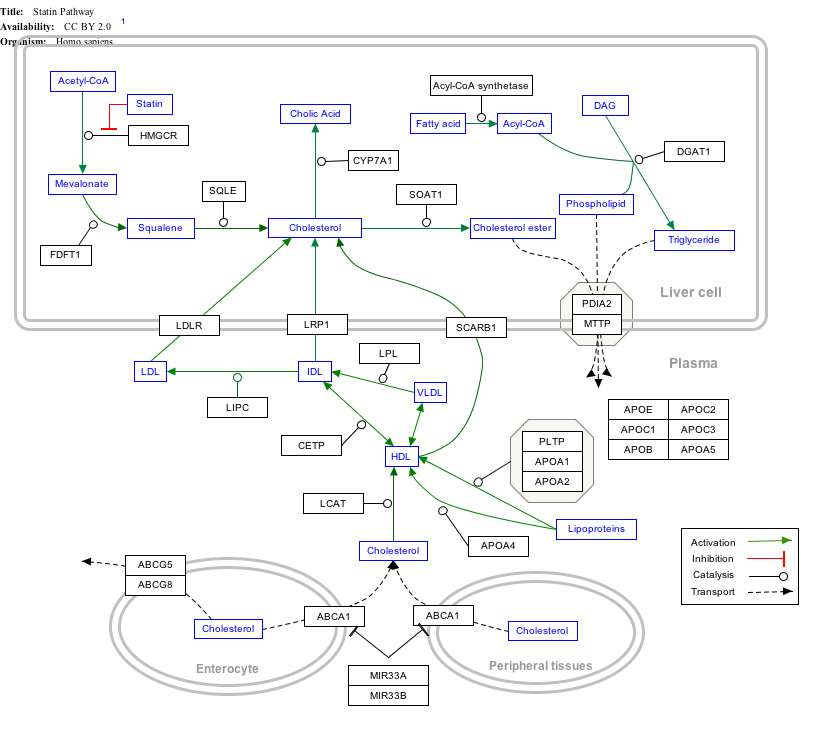

Statin pathway edit

== See also ==
- Cluster of differentiation
- Low density lipoprotein receptor gene family
