= Matrix metalloproteinase inhibitor =

A matrix metalloproteinase inhibitor (INN stem –mastat) inhibits matrix metalloproteinases. Because they inhibit cell migration, they have antiangiogenic effects. They are endogenous or exogenous.

The most notorious endogenous metalloproteinases are tissue inhibitors of metalloproteinases, followed by cartilage-derived angiogenesis inhibitors.

Exogenous matrix metalloproteinase inhibitors were developed as anticancer drugs. Examples include:

- Batimastat
- Cipemastat
- Ilomastat
- Marimastat
- Prinomastat
- Rebimastat
- Tanomastat

Metalloproteinase inhibitors are found in numerous marine organisms, including fish, cephalopods, mollusks, algae and bacteria.

== See also ==
- Drug discovery and development of MMP inhibitors
