= Rebimastat =

Investigational antineoplastic drug

Clinical data
- Other names: BMS-275291
- Routes of administration: By mouth

Identifiers
- IUPAC name: (2S)-N-[(2S)-3,3-dimethyl-1-(methylamino)-1-oxobutan-2-yl]-4-methyl-2-[[(2S)-2-sulfanyl-4-(3,4,4-trimethyl-2,5-dioxoimidazolidin-1-yl)butanoyl]amino]pentanamide
- CAS Number: 259188-38-0
- PubChem CID: 9913881
- DrugBank: DB06573
- ChemSpider: 8089530
- UNII: 1B47R6ZX4K
- KEGG: D03800
- ChEMBL: ChEMBL76222
- CompTox Dashboard (EPA): DTXSID80948835

Chemical and physical data
- Formula: C_{23}H_{41}N_{5}O_{5}S
- Molar mass: 499.67 g·mol^{−1}
- 3D model (JSmol): Interactive image
- SMILES: CNC(=O)[C@@H](NC(=O)[C@H](CC(C)C)NC(=O)[C@@H](S)CCN1C(=O)N(C)C(C)(C)C1=O)C(C)(C)C
- InChI: InChI=1S/C23H41N5O5S/c1-13(2)12-14(17(29)26-16(19(31)24-8)22(3,4)5)25-18(30)15(34)10-11-28-20(32)23(6,7)27(9)21(28)33/h13-16,34H,10-12H2,1-9H3,(H,24,31)(H,25,30)(H,26,29)/t14-,15-,16+/m0/s1; Key:GTXSRFUZSLTDFX-HRCADAONSA-N

Rebimastat is an abandoned investigational antineoplastic drug developed as a broad-spectrum matrix metalloproteinase inhibitor (MMPI). It was designed to target enzymes implicated in cancer progression, aiming to reduce tumor growth and metastasis. Although promising in preclinical studies, clinical development was halted due to adverse effects.

== Pharmacology ==
Rebimastat is a second-generation, sulfhydryl-based MMPI that binds to the catalytic zinc ion within the active site of several matrix metalloproteinases (MMPs), including MMP-1, MMP-2, MMP-7, MMP-9, and MMP-14. MMPs are zinc-dependent endopeptidases that play a crucial role in the degradation of the extracellular matrix (ECM). This ECM remodeling is essential for various physiological processes, but in cancer, it facilitates angiogenesis (formation of new blood vessels), tumor invasion, and metastasis (spread of cancer cells to distant sites). By inhibiting these MMPs, rebimastat aimed to disrupt these processes, potentially limiting tumor growth and spread by reducing blood supply and hindering tumor cell proliferation.

As one of the earlier non-hydroxamate MMPIs, rebimastat incorporates a thiol zinc-binding group. This design aimed to achieve broad-spectrum MMP inhibition while minimizing inhibition of sheddases (also known as ADAMs), metalloproteinases responsible for shedding membrane-bound proteins. This "sheddase-sparing" approach was intended to mitigate some of the side effects observed with earlier MMP inhibitors, which were thought to be related to the inhibition of these other metalloproteinases.

== History ==
Rebimastat was initially developed by Chiroscience (later part of Celltech Group plc) and subsequently by Bristol-Myers Squibb. Preclinical studies demonstrated rebimastat's potential, showing dose-dependent inhibition of angiogenesis and tumor metastasis in models such as the B16-BL6 metastatic melanoma cell line and the in vivo Matrigel plug cell migration assay. It also inhibited tumor progression in other rodent tumor models.

== Clinical trials ==
Clinical trials evaluated rebimastat's efficacy and safety in various cancers, including prostate cancer, HIV-related Kaposi's sarcoma, non-small cell lung cancer (NSCLC), and breast cancer. These included multiple phase II trials and at least one phase III trial.

However, clinical development was ultimately discontinued due to significant toxicity. Phase II trials in early-stage breast cancer and a phase III trial in NSCLC, where rebimastat was used as adjuvant therapy, were halted because patients experienced arthralgia (joint pain), a side effect consistent with MMP inhibitor-induced musculoskeletal toxicity. Other reported adverse effects included myalgia (muscle pain), skin rash, fatigue, nausea, headache, and taste alterations. The observed toxicity profile, coupled with a lack of significant clinical benefit, led to the termination of rebimastat's clinical development.
