= NUAK1 =

Protein-coding gene in the species Homo sapiens

Identifiers
- Aliases: NUAK1, ARK5, NUAK family kinase 1
- External IDs: OMIM: 608130; MGI: 1925226; HomoloGene: 8896; GeneCards: NUAK1; OMA:NUAK1 - orthologs

Gene location (Human)
Chr.	Chromosome 12 (human)
Band	12q23.3	Start	106,063,345 bp
Band	12q23.3	End	106,138,954 bp

Gene location (Mouse)
Chr.	Chromosome 10 (mouse)
Band	10|10 C1	Start	84,206,769 bp
Band	10|10 C1	End	84,276,461 bp
RNA expression pattern
Bgee	Human / Mouse (ortholog); Top expressed in: Brodmann area 23; middle temporal gyrus; hair follicle; Brodmann area 10; parietal lobe; postcentral gyrus; frontal pole; Brodmann area 46; endothelial cell; orbitofrontal cortex / Top expressed in: interventricular septum; calvaria; stroma of bone marrow; pontine nuclei; primary motor cortex; otic vesicle; ganglionic eminence; ankle; cerebellar vermis; soleus muscle; More reference expression data
BioGPS	n/a
Gene ontology
Molecular function	transferase activity; nucleotide binding; protein kinase activity; p53 binding; metal ion binding; kinase activity; protein binding; ATP binding; protein serine/threonine kinase activity
Cellular component	cytoplasm; microtubule cytoskeleton; nucleus; nucleoplasm; fibrillar center
Biological process	intracellular signal transduction; phosphorylation; cellular response to DNA damage stimulus; protein phosphorylation; regulation of cell adhesion; cell adhesion; regulation of cell population proliferation; regulation of cellular senescence; regulation of myosin-light-chain-phosphatase activity; regulation of signal transduction by p53 class mediator
Sources:Amigo / QuickGO
Orthologs
Species	Human	Mouse
Entrez	9891	77976
Ensembl	ENSG00000074590	ENSMUSG00000020032
UniProt	O60285	Q641K5
RefSeq (mRNA)	NM_014840	NM_001004363
RefSeq (protein)	NP_055655; NP_055655.1	NP_001004363
Location (UCSC)	Chr 12: 106.06 – 106.14 Mb	Chr 10: 84.21 – 84.28 Mb
PubMed search
- Wikidata
View/Edit Human	View/Edit Mouse

NUAK family SNF1-like kinase 1 also known as AMPK-related protein kinase 5 (ARK5) is an enzyme that in humans is encoded by the NUAK1 gene.

== Function ==
Acts as a regulator of cellular senescence and cellular ploidy by mediating phosphorylation of 'Ser-464' of LATS1, thereby controlling its stability. Controls cell adhesion by regulating activity of the myosin protein phosphatase 1 (PP1) complex.

== Clinical significance ==
ARK5 is important in tumor malignancy and invasiveness.

== Research findings ==
ARK5 is often overexpressed in multiple myeloma cell lines. ARK5 promotes tumor cell survival under regulation by Akt.

ARK5 increases MT1-MMP production. (MT1-MMP activates MMP-2 and MMP-9 which are involved in tumor metastasis.)

== As a drug target ==
ON123300 (a CDK4 inhibitor), also inhibits ARK5 and reduces proliferation of multiple myeloma and mantle cell lymphoma cell lines.

== Interactions ==
NUAK1 has been shown to interact with USP9X and Ubiquitin C.
