= Collagenase IV =

Collagenase IV may refer to one of two enzymes:

- Gelatinase A
- Gelatinase B
