= Gelatinase =

Class of enzymes

Gelatinases are enzymes capable of degrading gelatin through hydrolysis, playing a major role in degradation of extracellular matrix and tissue remodeling. Gelatinases are a type of matrix metalloproteinase (MMP), a family of enzymes that depend on zinc as a cofactor and can break down parts of the extracellular matrix. MMPs have multiple subgroups, including gelatinase A (MMP-2) and gelatinase B (MMP-9). Gelatinases are assigned a variety of Enzyme Commission numbers: gelatinase A uses 3.4.24.24, and gelatinase B uses 3.4.24.35, in which the first three numbers are same. The first digit, 3, is the class. Class 3 enzymes are hydrolases, enzymes that catalyze hydrolysis reactions, that is, they cleave bonds in presence of water. The next digit represents sub-class 4, or proteases, which are enzymes who hydrolyze peptide bonds in proteins. The next number is the sub-subclass of 24, which consists of metalloendopeptidases which contain metal ions in their active sites, in this case zinc, which help in cleaving peptide bonds. The last part of the EC number is the serial number, identifying specific enzymes within a sub-subclass. 24 represents gelatinase A, which is a metalloproteinase that breaks down gelatin and collagen, while 35 represents gelatinase B, which hydrolyzes peptide bonds.

== Gelatinase application in species ==
Gelatinase enzymes can be found in a number of eukaryotes, including mammals, and birds; bacteria including Pseudomonas aeruginosa and Serratia marcescens), and fungi, but may have variations among species based on identification and function of the gelatinase type. In humans, the gelatinases expressed are matrix metalloproteinases MMP2 and MMP9. Additionally, gelatinases A (MMP2) and B (MMP9) have been proven to assist in developing new blood vessels in corneas of rats and rabbits when experiencing corneal damage. Corneal wounds in these rodents can yield greater expression and activity of the enzyme. Gelatinase assists in remodeling damaged extracellular matrix (ECM) by removing the damaged matrix proteins (by MMP-9), yielding an angiogenic response, or formation of new blood vessels. This indicates that there is collagen remodeling in the corneal stromal repair tissue with Gelatinases.

== Enzyme pathway ==
These specific proteases use hydrolysis to break down gelatin through two sequential steps. The first produces polypeptide products, followed by amino acids (typically alpha amino acids). The substrate in this case is gelatin, and the products are the polypeptides formed. Gelatinase binds to the substrate, gelatin, due to specificity of binding interactions on cell surface. The catalysis, associated with a zinc ion and amino acid residues, breaks the peptide bonds into polypeptides through cleavage. Polypeptides are further converted into amino acids, the second sequential step and product of the reaction. Additional proteins, such as TIMP-2 and other TIMPs, work as inhibitors to regulate and control the enzymatic pathway by binding to the gelatinase active site, which prevents the breakdown of substrate.

=== Cell surface association ===
Gelatinases can regulate enzymatic activation and activity by interactions on the cell surface. Surface proteins regulate functions such as localization, inhibition, and internalization. Enzyme binding to the surface brings it in close accord with certain substrates in the pericellular space in order to regulate function of the MMPs. Localization allows them to degrade specific elements of the EMC by close cell surface association.

=== Crystal structures ===
Gelatinases contain a catalytic domain (located in the C-terminal region), which is essential for enzymatic activity and hydrolysis of peptide bonds in substrate molecules. This domain contains five beta strands in a twisted beta sheet bound together by three alpha helicies. The active site is located in between a beta strand and an alpha helix, holding histidine residues, with another helix holding a histidine residue, creating loops. These histidines are in relation to a catalytic zinc ion, playing an important role in catalyzing the hydrolysis of peptide bonds in proteins.Also in the C terminal region, there is a hemopexin-like domain, which interacts with a part of the cell membrane. Contributing to enzyme specificity, affinity, and localization, made of four blades with antiparallel beta stranded beta sheets. Furthermore, there is the fibronectin type II (FNII), important for recognition, folding, and mediation of gelatin interactions due to the involvement of protein-protein interactions, and are crucial for substrate specificity. FNII consists of two double-stranded antiparallel beta sheets. The primary structures of individual MMPs may have different domain compositions, and the arrangement of the domains and structures help with folding and stability of the enzyme, as folding is what promotes enzyme activity.

=== Active sites ===
Some of the gelatinases are proteinases that are zinc-dependent. The known active sites of these proteins are located in the catalytic domains, and typically contain a zinc atom at known site, which is important for catalysis. The active sites also contain histidine and glutamate residues, establishing the catalytic zinc-binding active site region. These residues are in coordination with the zinc ion for stabilization and conformation. This active site aids the hydrolysis of peptide bonds in substrates, such as gelatin and collagen, due to coordination of zinc ions and amino acid residues. They also influence gelatinase catalysis and binding of substrates.
