= Tissue inhibitor of metalloproteinase =

Tissue inhibitors of metalloproteinases (TIMPs) are specific endogenous protease inhibitors to the matrix metalloproteinases. There are four TIMPs; TIMP1, TIMP2, TIMP3 and TIMP4. TIMP3 has been observed progressively downregulated in Human papillomavirus-positive neoplastic keratinocytes derived from uterine cervical preneoplastic lesions at different levels of malignancy. For this reason, TIMP3 is likely to be associated with tumorigenesis and may be a potential prognostic marker for uterine cervical preneoplastic lesions progression.

Overall, all MMPs are inhibited by TIMPs once they are activated, but the gelatinases (MMP-2 and MMP-9) can form complexes with TIMPs when the enzymes are in their latent form.

The complex of latent MMP-2 (pro-MMP-2)with TIMP-2 serves to facilitate the activation of pro-MMP-2 at the cell surface by MT1-MMP (MMP-14), a membrane-anchored MMP.

The role of the pro-MMP-9/TIMP-1 complex is still unknown.
