= CL82198 =

Identifiers
- IUPAC name: N-(4-morpholin-4-ylbutyl)-1-benzofuran-2-carboxamide
- CAS Number: 307002-71-7
- PubChem CID: 2777
- CompTox Dashboard (EPA): DTXSID601024592

Chemical and physical data
- Formula: C_{17}H_{22}N_{2}O_{3}
- Molar mass: 302.374 g·mol^{−1}
- 3D model (JSmol): Interactive image
- SMILES: C1COCCN1CCCCNC(=O)C2=CC3=CC=CC=C3O2
- InChI: InChI=1S/C17H22N2O3/c20-17(16-13-14-5-1-2-6-15(14)22-16)18-7-3-4-8-19-9-11-21-12-10-19/h1-2,5-6,13H,3-4,7-12H2,(H,18,20); Key:KUJQEQAVMNFFAO-UHFFFAOYSA-N

CL82198 (CL-82198) is a matrix metalloproteinase (MMP) inhibitor selective for the MMP13 subtype. It is not used medically but is a widely used reference ligand for research into MMP13 and its involvement in numerous disease processes. MMP13 inhibition is of most interest in the treatment of arthritis, but MMP13 has also been found to be involved in many other medical conditions including osteoporosis, periodontal disease, cancer, and Alzheimer's disease.
