= Multicentric carpotarsal osteolysis syndrome =

- Other names: MCTO
- This condition is inherited in an autosomal dominant manner.
- Specialty: Medical genetics

Multicentric carpotarsal osteolysis syndrome (MCTO) is a rare autosomal dominant condition. Also known as idiopathic multicentric osteolysis with nephropathy, it is characterized by progressive destruction of the carpal and tarsal bones and renal failure.

== Signs and symptoms ==
The condition presents with gradual loss of the small bones in the carpus and tarsus, which may lead to joint subluxation and instability. Renal failure, when present, typically manifests as proteinuria.

In some cases, there may also be craniofacial abnormalities including

- Triangular facies
- Micrognathia
- Maxillary hypoplasia
- Exophthalmos

Histological examination of renal biopsies shows glomerulosclerosis and severe tubulointerstitial fibrosis. Intellectual disability may also occur.

== Genetics ==
This condition is caused by mutations in the transcription factor MafB, or V-maf musculoaponeurotic fibrosarcoma oncogene homolog B (MAFB), gene. This gene encodes a basic leucine zipper (bZIP) transcription factor. The gene is located on the long arm of chromosome 20 (20q11.2-q13.1).

== Pathogenesis ==
How this mutation causes the clinical picture is not currently clear.

== Diagnosis ==
The diagnosis may be suspected on the basis of the constellation of clinical features. It is made by sequencing the MAFB gene.

=== Classification ===
This condition has been classified into five types.

- Type 1: hereditary multicentric osteolysis with dominant transmission
- Type 2: hereditary multicentric osteolysis with recessive transmission
- Type 3: nonhereditary multicentric osteolysis with nephropathy
- Type 4: Gorham–Stout syndrome

=== Differential diagnosis ===
The condition should be differentially diagnosed from juvenile rheumatoid arthritis and other genetic skeletal dysplasias as Multicentric Osteolysis, Nodulosis, and Arthropathy.

== Treatment ==
Optimal treatment for this condition is unclear. Bisphosphonates and denosumab may be of use for the bone lesions. Cyclosporine A may be of use for treating the nephropathy. Steroids and other immunosuppressant drugs do not seem to be of help.

== History ==
This condition was first described by Shurtleff et al. in 1964.
