= MMP14 =

Protein-coding gene in the species Homo sapiens

Identifiers
- Aliases: MMP14, MMP-14, MMP-X1, MT-MMP, MT-MMP 1, MT1-MMP, MT1MMP, MTMMP1, WNCHRS, matrix metallopeptidase 14
- External IDs: OMIM: 600754; MGI: 101900; GeneCards: MMP14
Available structures
PDB	Ortholog search: PDBe RCSB
PDB	List of PDB id codes 1BQQ, 1BUV, 2MQS, 3C7X, 3MA2, 4P3C, 4P3D, 4QXU, 3X23
Enzyme activity
EC #	BRENDA	ExPASy	KEGG	MetaCyc
3.4.24.80	↗	↗	↗	↗

Gene location (Human)
Chr.	Chromosome 14 (human)
Band	14q11.2	Start	22,836,560 bp
Band	14q11.2	End	22,849,041 bp

Gene location (Mouse)
Chr.	Chromosome 14 (mouse)
Band	14 C2|14 27.79 cM	Start	54,669,069 bp
Band	14 C2|14 27.79 cM	End	54,682,821 bp

RNA expression pattern
Bgee	Human / Mouse (ortholog); Top expressed in: stromal cell of endometrium; gastric mucosa; gallbladder; canal of the cervix; body of uterus; ectocervix; smooth muscle tissue; right coronary artery; popliteal artery; tibial arteries / Top expressed in: calvaria; body of femur; umbilical cord; molar; stroma of bone marrow; external carotid artery; uterus; internal carotid artery; endothelial cell of lymphatic vessel; lip; More reference expression data
BioGPS	More reference expression data
Gene ontology
Molecular function	zinc ion binding; metal ion binding; integrin binding; peptidase activity; protein binding; metalloendopeptidase activity; peptidase activator activity; metallopeptidase activity; hydrolase activity; serine-type endopeptidase activity; metalloaminopeptidase activity; endopeptidase activity
Cellular component	cytoplasm; integral component of membrane; membrane; focal adhesion; extracellular matrix; melanosome; plasma membrane; integral component of plasma membrane; macropinosome; Golgi lumen; cytoplasmic vesicle; extracellular space; nucleus; cytosol; intermediate filament cytoskeleton
Biological process	positive regulation of myotube differentiation; male gonad development; response to hypoxia; endodermal cell differentiation; response to organic cyclic compound; ossification; lung development; astrocyte cell migration; positive regulation of cell migration; positive regulation of B cell differentiation; zymogen activation; response to mechanical stimulus; extracellular matrix disassembly; endochondral ossification; response to oxidative stress; craniofacial suture morphogenesis; proteolysis; positive regulation of peptidase activity; response to estrogen; positive regulation of cell growth; endothelial cell proliferation; chondrocyte proliferation; angiogenesis; collagen catabolic process; ovarian follicle development; embryonic cranial skeleton morphogenesis; response to hormone; tissue remodeling; bone development; branching morphogenesis of an epithelial tube; negative regulation of focal adhesion assembly; cell migration; negative regulation of Notch signaling pathway; protein processing; cell motility; positive regulation of macrophage migration; response to odorant; positive regulation of protein processing; head development; regulation of protein localization to plasma membrane; skeletal system development; extracellular matrix organization
Sources:Amigo / QuickGO
Orthologs
Databases	NCBI: entry; OMA: entry
Species	Human	Mouse
Entrez	4323	17387
Ensembl	ENSG00000157227	ENSMUSG00000000957
UniProt	P50281	P53690
RefSeq (mRNA)	NM_004995	NM_008608
RefSeq (protein)	NP_004986	NP_032634
Location (UCSC)	Chr 14: 22.84 – 22.85 Mb	Chr 14: 54.67 – 54.68 Mb
PubMed search
- Wikidata
View/Edit Human	View/Edit Mouse

Matrix metalloproteinase-14 is an enzyme that in humans is encoded by the MMP14 gene.

== Structure ==
Matrix metalloproteinase-14 (MMP14), also known as MT1-MMP, is a zinc-dependent type I transmembrane metalloproteinase characterized by a modular structure that enables its diverse biological functions. The protein comprises an extracellular catalytic domain responsible for matrix degradation, a short 20-amino acid cytoplasmic tail, and a single transmembrane domain anchoring it to the cell membrane. The gene encoding MMP14 is organized into ten exons, with the novel C-terminal peptide domains and the 3'-untranslated region encoded by a single large exon; this structure is distinct from other MMP family members. The exons for the catalytic and pro-domains are unique to MMP14, while the hemopexin-like domains share similarity with other MMPs. The short intracellular domain (ICD) of MMP14 contains a unique lysine residue (Lys581) that can be mono-ubiquitinated, a modification that regulates the enzyme's trafficking and cellular invasion functions. This structural arrangement allows MMP14 to localize its proteolytic activity to the pericellular environment, facilitating processes such as extracellular matrix remodeling, cell migration, and activation of other MMPs, notably pro-MMP2.

== Function ==
MMP14 (matrix metalloproteinase-14) is a membrane-anchored enzyme with critical roles in tissue remodeling, development, and cellular metabolism. Its primary function is the proteolytic degradation of extracellular matrix (ECM) components, which is essential for processes such as organ development, cell migration, and branching morphogenesis. MMP14 directly activates other MMPs, most notably MMP2, and indirectly activates MMP13 and MMP9, thereby amplifying ECM remodeling and facilitating cellular invasion, a mechanism particularly relevant in cancer metastasis. Beyond its catalytic activity, MMP14 interacts with cell surface molecules (such as CD44 and integrins) to modulate cell signaling and behavior. Studies in knockout mice have shown that loss of MMP14 leads to severe defects in collagen turnover, impaired adipogenesis, metabolic imbalance, and increased autophagy, highlighting its role in maintaining metabolic homeostasis and energy storage. MMP14 integrates extracellular matrix remodeling with intracellular energy regulation, making it an important regulator of both tissue structure and metabolic balance.

== Clinical significance ==
Increased expression of MMP14 has been observed in several cancers, including bladder, breast, colorectal, and renal cancers, and is often associated with more advanced disease and poorer short-term prognosis. High MMP14 expression in tumor tissues correlates with increased tumor progression, metastasis, and reduced survival rates, particularly in muscle-invasive bladder cancer and colorectal cancer. In addition, MMP14 is involved in the tumor microenvironment, including its expression by cancer-associated fibroblasts, which may contribute to tumor recurrence and resistance to certain chemotherapies. While these associations suggest that MMP14 could serve as a useful prognostic biomarker and potential therapeutic target, its precise role and clinical utility may vary depending on cancer type and context.

== Interactions ==
MMP14 has been shown to interact with TIMP2.

== See also ==
- Matrix metalloproteinase
- ARK5
