= Sorsby's fundus dystrophy =

- Other names: Sorsby pseudoinflammatory fundus dystrophy
- Sorsby's fundus dystrophy is inherited in an autosomal dominant manner.

Sorsby's fundus dystrophy (SFD) is a very rare genetic disorder characterized by the loss of central vision. It was first described by Sorsby and Mason in 1949.

== Signs and symptoms ==
Patients typically become symptomatic in their 40s due to loss of central vision. However, tests of rod photoreceptor function (i.e., night vision tests) show dysfunction at an earlier age. One of the most sensitive visual function parameters for early SFD is a prolongation of rod-mediated dark adaptation. High-resolution structural imaging of the Bruch's membrane and of the underlying choriocapillaris – the capillary plexus nourishing the outer retina – also shows early alterations.

== Genetics ==
The inheritance pattern is autosomal dominant. It is related to a mutation in the TIMP3 gene.
