= Anthrax lethal factor endopeptidase =

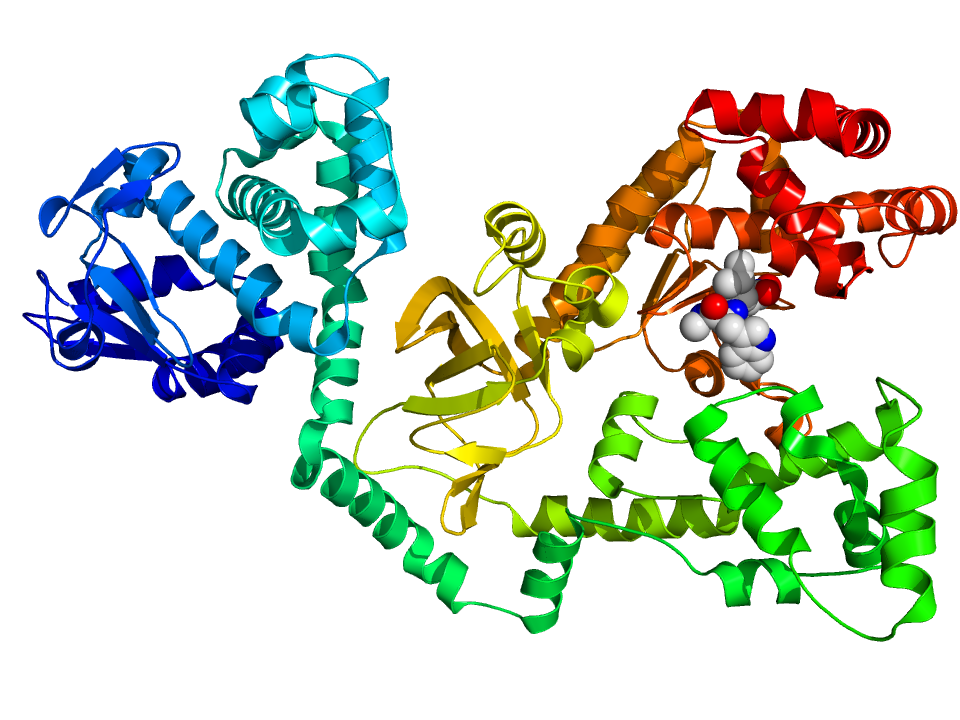
- Crystallographic structure of anthrax lethal factor (rainbow colored cartoon, N-terminus = blue, C-terminus = red) complexed with the inhibitor GM6001 (space-filling model, carbon = white, oxygen = red, nitrogen = blue).

Identifiers
- EC no.: 3.4.24.83
- CAS no.: 477950-41-7

Databases
- IntEnz: IntEnz view
- BRENDA: BRENDA entry
- ExPASy: NiceZyme view
- KEGG: KEGG entry
- MetaCyc: metabolic pathway
- PRIAM: profile
- PDB structures: RCSB PDB PDBe PDBsum
Search
- PMC: articles
- PubMed: articles
- NCBI: proteins

Anthrax lethal factor endopeptidase (EC 3.4.24.83, lethal toxin) is an enzyme that catalyzes the hydrolysis of mitogen-activated protein kinase kinases. This enzyme is a component of the lethal factor produced by the bacterium Bacillus anthracis. The preferred cleavage site can be denoted by BBBBxHxH, in which B denotes a basic amino acid Arg or Lys, H denotes a hydrophobic amino acid, and x is any amino acid.
