= MMP2 =

Protein-coding gene in humans

Identifiers
- Aliases: MMP2, CLG4, CLG4A, MMP-2, MMP-II, MONA, TBE-1, matrix metallopeptidase 2
- External IDs: OMIM: 120360; MGI: 97009; GeneCards: MMP2
Available structures
| PDB | Ortholog search: PDBe RCSB |
| PDB | List of PDB id codes 1CK7, 1CXW, 1EAK, 1GEN, 1GXD, 1HOV, 1J7M, 1KS0, 1QIB, 1RTG, 3AYU |
Enzyme activity
| EC # | BRENDA | ExPASy | KEGG | MetaCyc |
|---|---|---|---|---|
| 3.4.24.24 | ↗ | ↗ | ↗ | ↗ |

Gene location (Human)
| Chr. | Chromosome 16 (human) |
| Band | 16q12.2 | Start | 55,389,700 bp |
| Band | 16q12.2 | End | 55,506,691 bp |

Gene location (Mouse)
| Chr. | Chromosome 8 (mouse) |
| Band | 8 C5|8 44.99 cM | Start | 93,553,919 bp |
| Band | 8 C5|8 44.99 cM | End | 93,580,048 bp |
RNA expression pattern
| Bgee | Human / Mouse (ortholog); Top expressed in: stromal cell of endometrium; gallbladder; gastric mucosa; canal of the cervix; skin of hip; smooth muscle tissue; epithelium of colon; right lung; left uterine tube; Descending thoracic aorta / Top expressed in: vestibular sensory epithelium; external carotid artery; calvaria; internal carotid artery; body of femur; condyle; vas deferens; conjunctival fornix; fossa; ankle; More reference expression data |
| BioGPS | More reference expression data |
Gene ontology
| Molecular function | zinc ion binding; metal ion binding; peptidase activity; protein binding; metalloendopeptidase activity; hydrolase activity; metallopeptidase activity; serine-type endopeptidase activity |
| Cellular component | cytoplasm; membrane; plasma membrane; sarcomere; extracellular region; mitochondrion; nucleus; extracellular matrix; extracellular space; collagen-containing extracellular matrix |
| Biological process | intramembranous ossification; response to hypoxia; endodermal cell differentiation; ephrin receptor signaling pathway; skeletal system morphogenesis; extracellular matrix disassembly; bone trabecula formation; proteolysis; angiogenesis; positive regulation of innate immune response; collagen catabolic process; cellular response to amino acid stimulus; face morphogenesis; embryo implantation; blood vessel maturation; positive regulation of vascular associated smooth muscle cell proliferation; cytokine-mediated signaling pathway; extracellular matrix organization; cellular response to reactive oxygen species; positive regulation of smooth muscle cell proliferation; tissue remodeling; response to amyloid-beta |
Sources:Amigo / QuickGO
Orthologs
| Databases | NCBI: entry; OMA: entry |
| Species | Human | Mouse |
| Entrez | 4313 | 17390 |
| Ensembl | ENSG00000087245 | ENSMUSG00000031740 |
| UniProt | P08253 | P33434 |
| RefSeq (mRNA) | NM_004530; NM_001127891; NM_001302508; NM_001302509; NM_001302510 | NM_008610 |
| RefSeq (protein) | NP_001121363; NP_001289437; NP_001289438; NP_001289439; NP_004521 | NP_032636 |
| Location (UCSC) | Chr 16: 55.39 – 55.51 Mb | Chr 8: 93.55 – 93.58 Mb |
| PubMed search |
- Wikidata
| View/Edit Human | View/Edit Mouse |

72 kDa type IV collagenase also known as matrix metalloproteinase-2 (MMP-2) and gelatinase A is an enzyme that in humans is encoded by the MMP2 gene. The MMP2 gene is located on chromosome 16 at position 12.2.

== Function ==
Proteins of the matrix metalloproteinase (MMP) family are involved in the breakdown of extracellular matrix (ECM) in normal physiological processes, such as embryonic development, reproduction, and tissue remodeling, as well as in disease processes, such as arthritis and metastasis. Most MMP's are secreted as inactive proproteins which are activated when cleaved by extracellular proteinases. This gene encodes an enzyme which degrades type IV collagen, the major structural component of basement membranes. The enzyme plays a role in endometrial menstrual breakdown, regulation of vascularization and the inflammatory response.

== Activation ==
Activation of MMP-2 requires proteolytic processing. A complex of membrane type 1 MMP (MT1-MMP/MMP14) and tissue inhibitor of metalloproteinase 2 recruits pro-MMP 2 from the extracellular milieu to the cell surface. Activation then requires an active molecule of MT1-MMP and auto catalytic cleavage. Clustering of integrin chains promotes activation of MMP-2. Another factor that will support the activation of MMP-2 is cell-cell clustering. A wild-type activated leukocyte cell adhesion molecule (ALCAM) is also required to activate MMP-2.

== Clinical significance ==
Mutations in the MMP2 gene are associated with Torg-Winchester syndrome, multicentric osteolysis, arthritis syndrome, and possibly keloids.

=== Role of MMP-2 in chronic disease ===
Activity of MMP-2 relative to the other gelatinase (MMP-9) has been associated with severity of chronic airway diseases including Idiopathic interstitial pneumonia and Bronchiectasis. In idiopathic interstitial pneumonia, MMP-2 activity was elevated in patients with the less severe disease phenotype which is more responsive and reversible with corticosteroid therapy. In non-cystic fibrosis bronchiectasis, MMP-2 concentration was elevated in patients with Haemophilus influenzae airway infection compared to Pseudomonas aeruginosa airway infection. Bronchiectasis patients with P. aeruginosa infection have a more rapid decline in lung function. Disease-causing mutations in the MMP2 gene cause a rare type of skeletal dysplasia Multicentric Osteolysis, Nodulosis, and Arthropathy syndrome. Abnormal mutations cause defective collagen remodelling. The disease manifestations include bone destruction especially of the wrists and tarsus, generalized osteoporosis and joint stiffness and eventually destruction.

Altered expression and activity levels of MMPs have been strongly implicated in the progression and metastasis of many forms of cancer. Increased MMP-2 activity has also been linked with a poor prognosis in multiple forms of cancer including colorectal, melanoma, breast, lung, ovarian, and prostate. Furthermore, changes in MMP-2 activity can come from alterations in levels of transcription, MMP secretion, MMP activation, or MMP inhibition. MMP production in many cancers may be upregulated in surrounding stromal tissue rather than simply in the tumor lesion. For instance, Mook, et al. showed that MMP-2 mRNA levels are strikingly similar between metastatic and non-metastatic lesions in colorectal cancer, but metastatic cases are correlated with higher levels of MMP-2 mRNA in surrounding healthy tissue. For this reason, it is difficult to fully understand the complex role of MMPs in cancer progression.

==== Role in cancer cell invasion ====
One of the major implications of MMPs in cancer progression is their role in ECM degradation, which allows cancer cells to migrate out of the primary tumor to form metastases. More specifically, MMP-2 (along with MMP-9) is capable of degrading type IV collagen, the most abundant component of the basement membrane. The basement membrane is important for maintaining tissue organization, providing structural support for cells, and influencing cell signaling and polarity. Degradation of the basement membrane is an essential step for the metastatic progression of most cancers.

Cancer cell invasion, ECM degradation, and metastasis are highly linked with the presence of invadopodia, protrusive and adhesive structures on cancer cells. Invadopodia have been shown to concentrate MMPs (including MT1-MMP, MMP-2, and MMP-9) for localized release and activation. Furthermore, degradation products of MMP activity may further promote invadopodia formation and MMP activity. Finally, MMP-2 and several other MMPs have been shown to proteolytically activate TGF-β, which has been shown to promote epithelial mesenchymal transition (EMT), a key process involved in cancer metastasis.

==== Role in cell signaling ====
MMP degradation of the ECM affects cellular behavior through changes in integrin-cell binding, by releasing growth factors harbored by the ECM, by generating ECM degradation products, and by revealing cryptic binding sites in ECM molecules. For instance, MMP-2 degradation of collagen type I can reveal a previously inaccessible cryptic binding site that binds with the α_{v}β_{3} integrin expressed by human melanoma cells. Signaling through this integrin is necessary for melanoma cell viability and growth in a collagen matrix and can potentially rescue the cells from apoptosis. As another example, cleavage of laminin-5, a component of the basement membrane, by MMP-2 has been shown to reveal a cryptic site inducing migration of breast epithelial cells.

More generally, by degrading the ECM, MMPs release growth factors that were previously bound to the ECM, allowing them to bind with cell receptors and influence cell signaling. Furthermore, many MMPs also activate other proMMPs along with growth factors. MMP-2 has also been shown to cleave other non-ECM substrates including growth factors such as TGF-β, FGF receptor-1, proTNF, IL-1β and various chemokines. For instance, MMP-2 has been implicated, along with MMP-9 in cleaving latent TGF-β, which has complex interactions with cancer cells. TGF-β generally plays a role in maintaining tissue homeostasis and preventing tumor progression. However, genetically unstable cancer cells can often evade regulation by TGF-β by altering TGF-β receptors in downstream signaling processes. Furthermore, expression of TGF-β is also correlated with immune tolerance and may help shield cancer cells from immune regulation.

==== Role in neovascularization and lymphangiogenesis ====
MMP-2 also plays an important role in the formation of new blood vessels within tumors, a process known as angiogenesis. This process is essential for tumor progression, because as tumors grow they need increasing supplies of oxygen and nutrients. Localized MMP-2 activity plays an important role in endothelial cell migration, a key feature of angiogenesis. Additionally, MMP-9 and other MMPs have been suggested to also play a complex, indirect role in angiogenesis by promoting VEGF mobilization and generating antiangiogenic factors.

For instance, when studying carcinogenesis of pancreatic islets in transgenic mice, Bergers et al. showed that MMP-2 and MMP-9 were upregulated in angiogenic lesions and that the upregulation of these MMPs triggered the release of bioactive VEGF, a potent stimulator of angiogenesis. Additionally, the group determined that MMP-2 knockout mice showed decreased rates of tumor growth relative to tumor growth rates in wild type mice. Furthermore, increased expression and activity of MMP-2 has been tied to increased vascularization of lung carcinoma metastases in the central nervous system, which likely increases survival rate of these metastases.

Finally, MMP-2 has been also shown to drive lymphangiogenesis, which is often excessive in tumor environments and can provide a route of metastasis for cancer cells. Detry, et al. showed that knocking down mmp2 in zebrafish prevented the formation of lymphatic vessels without altering angiogenesis, while MMP-2 inhibition slowed the migration of lymphatic endothelial cells and altered the morphology of new vessels. These results suggest that MMP-2 may alter tumor viability and invasion by regulating lymphangiogenesis in addition to angiogenesis.

==== Inhibition of MMP-2 as cancer therapy ====
Clinical trials for cancer therapies using MMP inhibitors have yielded generally unsuccessful results. These poor results are likely due to the fact that MMPs play complex roles in tissue formation and cancer progression, and indeed many MMPs have both pro and anti-tumorogenic properties. Furthermore, most clinical studies involve advanced stages of cancer, where MMP inhibitors are not particularly effective. Finally, there are no reliable biomarkers available for assessing the efficacy of MMP inhibitors and MMPs are not directly cytotoxic (so they do not cause tumor shrinkage), so it is difficult for researchers to determine whether the inhibitors have successfully reached their targets.

However, initial clinical trials using broad spectrum MMP inhibitors did show some positive results. Phase I clinical trials showed that MMP inhibitors are generally safe with minimal adverse side effects. Additionally, trials with marimastat did show a slight increase in survival of patients with gastric or pancreatic cancer.

Various research groups have already suggested many strategies for improving the effectiveness of MMP inhibitors in cancer treatment. First, highly specific MMP inhibitors could be used to target the functions of specific MMPs, which should allow doctors to increase the treatment dosage while minimizing adverse side effects. MMP inhibitors could also be administered along with cytotoxic agents or other proteinase inhibitors. Finally, MMP inhibitors could be used during earlier stages of cancer to prevent invasion and metastasis.

Additionally, the overexpression of MMPs in tumors can potentially be leveraged to direct the release of chemotherapeutic agents specifically to tumor sites. For example, cytotoxic agents or siRNA could be encapsulated in liposomes or viral vectors that become activated only upon proteolytic cleavage by a target MMP. Moreover, the tumor-targeting characteristics of MMP inhibitors provide a promising strategy for identifying small tumors. Researchers could link MMP inhibitors to imaging agents to facilitate the detection of tumors before they spread. Though initial trials yielded disappointing results, MMP inhibitors offer significant potential for improving cancer treatment by slowing the process of cancer cell invasion and metastasis.

== Interactions ==
MMP2 has been shown to interact with:

- CCL7,
- THBS2,
- TIMP2,
- TIMP4, and
- Thrombospondin 1.

== Ligands ==
=== Inhibitors ===
- AC-73 (suppresses MMP-2 activation by disrupting dimerization of CD147)
- ARP-100
- Astragaloside IV (downregulation of MMP-2 via suppression of ERK1/2 and JNK activation)
- CP-471474
- CTS-1027 (selective for MMP-2 and MMP-13 over other MMP subtypes)
- Batimastat (non selective)
- Ilomastat (non selective)
- JR-AB2-011 (indirect inhibition of MMP-2 via inhibition of mTORC2)
- Marimastat (non selective)
- PD-166793
- Prinomastat (non selective)
- PD-166793
- SB-3CT
- Tanomastat
- TP0597850
- XL-784
