= TIMP4 =

Protein-coding gene in the species Homo sapiens

Identifiers
- Aliases: TIMP4, TIMP metallopeptidase inhibitor 4, TIMP-4
- External IDs: OMIM: 601915; MGI: 109125; HomoloGene: 37748; GeneCards: TIMP4; OMA:TIMP4 - orthologs

Gene location (Human)
Chr.	Chromosome 3 (human)
Band	3p25.2	Start	12,153,068 bp
Band	3p25.2	End	12,158,912 bp

Gene location (Mouse)
Chr.	Chromosome 6 (mouse)
Band	6 E3|6 53.29 cM	Start	115,218,853 bp
Band	6 E3|6 53.29 cM	End	115,229,166 bp
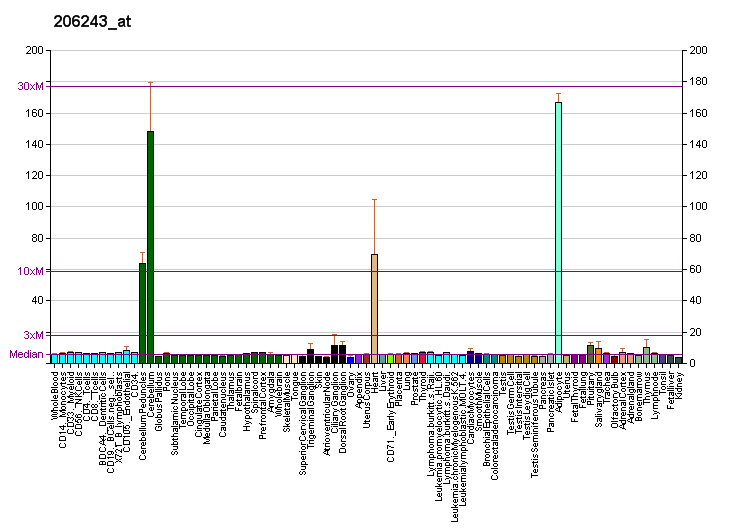
RNA expression pattern
Bgee	Human / Mouse (ortholog); Top expressed in: abdominal fat; subcutaneous adipose tissue; thoracic aorta; left coronary artery; ascending aorta; apex of heart; synovial joint; right hemisphere of cerebellum; Descending thoracic aorta; popliteal artery / Top expressed in: interventricular septum; white adipose tissue; lobe of cerebellum; cerebellar vermis; lumbar subsegment of spinal cord; motor neuron; deep cerebellar nuclei; tunica media of zone of aorta; substantia nigra; brown adipose tissue; More reference expression data
BioGPS	More reference expression data
Gene ontology
Molecular function	peptidase inhibitor activity; enzyme inhibitor activity; metal ion binding; protease binding; metalloendopeptidase inhibitor activity
Cellular component	sarcomere; extracellular region; extracellular space; extracellular matrix
Biological process	Notch signaling pathway; negative regulation of peptidase activity; response to peptide hormone; central nervous system development; response to lipopolysaccharide; ovulation cycle; negative regulation of membrane protein ectodomain proteolysis; negative regulation of catalytic activity; negative regulation of endopeptidase activity; response to hormone; response to cytokine; biological process; response to organic substance
Sources:Amigo / QuickGO
Orthologs
Species	Human	Mouse
Entrez	7079	110595
Ensembl	ENSG00000157150	ENSMUSG00000030317
UniProt	Q99727	Q9JHB3
RefSeq (mRNA)	NM_003256	NM_080639; NM_001356406
RefSeq (protein)	NP_003247	NP_542370; NP_001343335
Location (UCSC)	Chr 3: 12.15 – 12.16 Mb	Chr 6: 115.22 – 115.23 Mb
PubMed search
- Wikidata
View/Edit Human	View/Edit Mouse

Metalloproteinase inhibitor 4 is an enzyme that in humans is encoded by the TIMP4 gene.

This gene belongs to the tissue inhibitor of metalloproteinases gene family. The proteins encoded by this gene family are inhibitors of the matrix metalloproteinases, a group of peptidases involved in degradation of the extracellular matrix. The secreted, netrin domain-containing protein encoded by this gene is involved in regulation of platelet aggregation and recruitment and may play role in hormonal regulation and endometrial tissue remodeling.

== Interactions ==
TIMP4 has been shown to interact with MMP2.

== See also ==
- TIMP1, TIMP2, TIMP3
