= TIMP3 =

Protein-coding gene in the species Homo sapiens

Available structures
| PDB | Ortholog search: PDBe RCSB |
| PDB | List of PDB id codes 3CKI |

Identifiers
- Aliases: TIMP3, HSMRK222, K222, K222TA2, SFD, TIMP metallopeptidase inhibitor 3
- External IDs: OMIM: 188826; MGI: 98754; HomoloGene: 36322; GeneCards: TIMP3; OMA:TIMP3 - orthologs

Gene location (Human)
| Chr. | Chromosome 22 (human) |
| Band | 22q12.3 | Start | 32,801,705 bp |
| Band | 22q12.3 | End | 32,863,041 bp |

Gene location (Mouse)
| Chr. | Chromosome 10 (mouse) |
| Band | 10 C1|10 42.83 cM | Start | 86,136,236 bp |
| Band | 10 C1|10 42.83 cM | End | 86,185,370 bp |
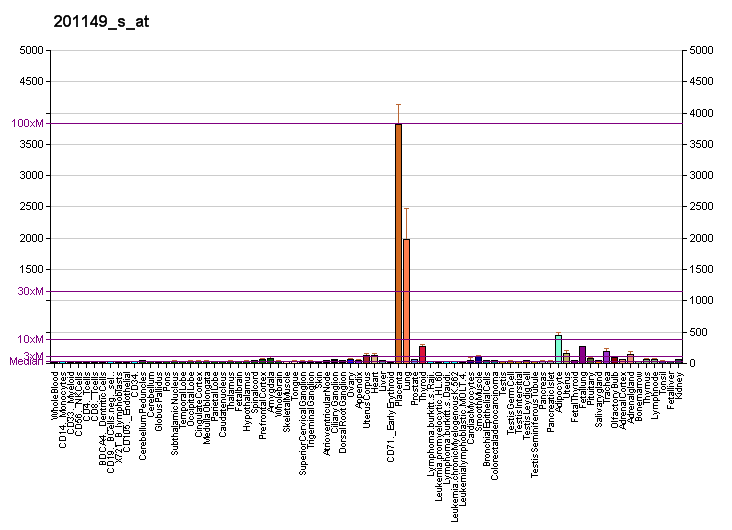

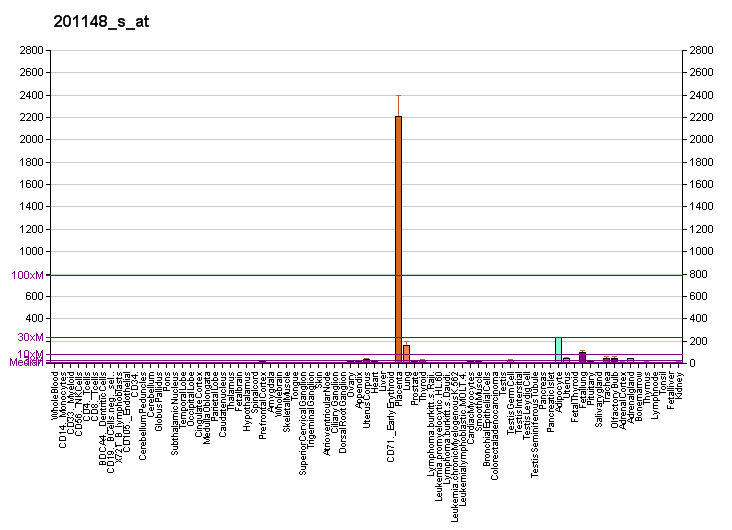

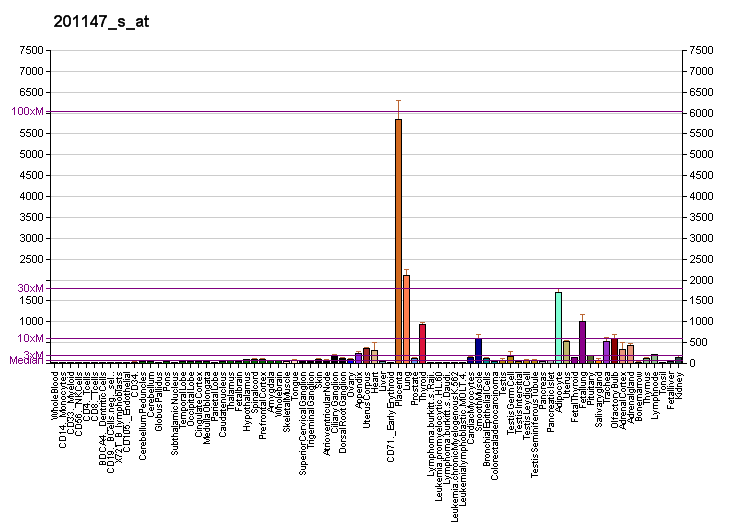
RNA expression pattern
| Bgee | Human / Mouse (ortholog); Top expressed in: synovial joint; decidua; retinal pigment epithelium; urethra; right lung; lower lobe of lung; vena cava; saphenous vein; upper lobe of lung; upper lobe of left lung / Top expressed in: retinal pigment epithelium; right kidney; ciliary body; right lung; human kidney; right lung lobe; carotid body; aortic valve; skin of external ear; iris; More reference expression data |
| BioGPS | More reference expression data |
Gene ontology
| Molecular function | peptidase inhibitor activity; enzyme inhibitor activity; metal ion binding; protease binding; protein binding; metalloendopeptidase inhibitor activity |
| Cellular component | extracellular matrix; basement membrane; extracellular exosome; nucleus; extracellular region; platelet dense granule lumen; extracellular space; collagen-containing extracellular matrix |
| Biological process | cellular response to organic substance; negative regulation of peptidase activity; response to stimulus; positive regulation of TRAIL-activated apoptotic signaling pathway; negative regulation of ERK1 and ERK2 cascade; negative regulation of membrane protein ectodomain proteolysis; visual perception; platelet degranulation; response to organic substance; negative regulation of metalloendopeptidase activity; response to hormone; negative regulation of endopeptidase activity; response to cytokine |
Sources:Amigo / QuickGO
Orthologs
| Species | Human | Mouse |
| Entrez | 7078 | 21859 |
| Ensembl | ENSG00000100234 | ENSMUSG00000020044 |
| UniProt | P35625 | P39876 |
| RefSeq (mRNA) | NM_000362 | NM_011595 |
| RefSeq (protein) | NP_000353 | NP_035725 |
| Location (UCSC) | Chr 22: 32.8 – 32.86 Mb | Chr 10: 86.14 – 86.19 Mb |
| PubMed search |
- Wikidata
| View/Edit Human | View/Edit Mouse |

Metalloproteinase inhibitor 3 is a protein that in humans is encoded by the TIMP3 gene.

This gene belongs to the tissue inhibitor of metalloproteinases gene family. The proteins encoded by this gene family are inhibitors of the matrix metalloproteinases, a group of peptidases involved in degradation of the extracellular matrix (ECM). Expression of this gene is induced in response to mitogenic stimulation and this netrin domain-containing protein is localized to the ECM. Mutations in this gene have been associated with the autosomal dominant disorder Sorsby's fundus dystrophy.

== See also ==
- TIMP1, TIMP2, TIMP4
