= Tanomastat =

Names
- IUPAC name (S)-4-(4'-Chlorobiphenyl-4-yl)-4-oxo-2-[(phenylsulfanyl)methyl]butanoic acid
- Other names BAY 12-9566

Identifiers
CAS Number	179545-77-8
3D model (JSmol)	Interactive image
Beilstein Reference	10706708
ChEMBL	ChEMBL261932
ChemSpider	5293540
PubChem CID	6918336
UNII	AM1ZX94EXH
- InChI: InChI=1S/C23H19ClO3S/c24-20-12-10-17(11-13-20)16-6-8-18(9-7-16)22(25)14-19(23(26)27)15-28-21-4-2-1-3-5-21/h1-13,19H,14-15H2,(H,26,27)/t19-/m1/s1 Key: JXAGDPXECXQWBC-LJQANCHMSA-N
- SMILES: C1=CC=C(C=C1)SC[C@@H](CC(=O)C2=CC=C(C=C2)C3=CC=C(C=C3)Cl)C(=O)O

Properties
Chemical formula	C_{23}H_{19}ClO_{3}S
Molar mass	410.91 g·mol^{−1}
- Except where otherwise noted, data are given for materials in their standard state (at 25 °C [77 °F], 100 kPa). verify (what is ?) Infobox references

Tanomastat (development code BAY 12-9566) is a non-peptidic biphenyl inhibitor of matrix metalloproteinases (MMPs), primarily studied for its potential to treat various types of cancer, including osteosarcoma and other malignancies.

Excision of malignant tumors comprises first line treatment for cancer of solid tissues. This procedure not infrequently misses small fragments of the tumor that may have broken off before surgery from the principal site of the disease. These fragments, metastases, often proliferate at quite remote locations where they cause much of the pathology of cancer. A series of proteolytic enzymes present in tumor cells, known as matrix metalloproteinases, help establish growth of these metastases at the newly invaded sites; these proteases are also involved in the formation of new blood vessels that will nourish the invasive cell masses. Consequently, considerable research has been devoted to matrix metalloproteinases as a target for anticancer drugs. Clinical results with these compounds have to date produced equivocal results.

== See also ==
- Batimastat
- Marimastat
