= Matrix metallopeptidase 13 =

Protein-coding gene in the species Homo sapiens

MMP13
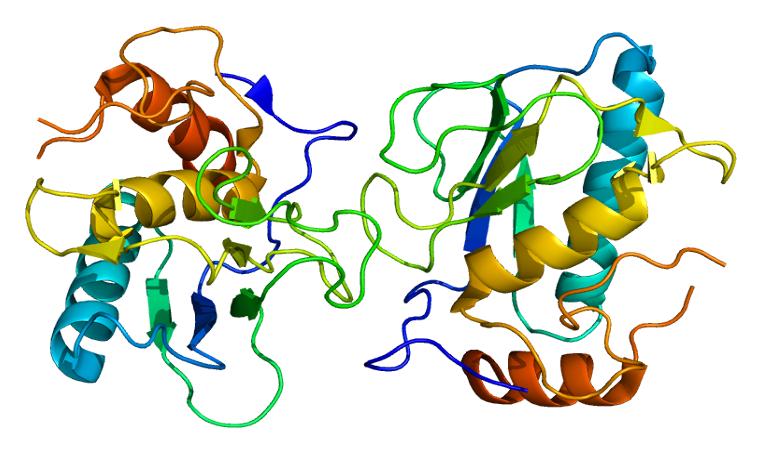

Identifiers
- Aliases: MMP13, CLG3, MANDP1, MMP-13, Matrix metallopeptidase 13, MDST
- External IDs: OMIM: 600108; MGI: 1340026; GeneCards: MMP13
Available structures
PDB	Ortholog search: PDBe RCSB
PDB	List of PDB id codes 1EUB, 1FLS, 1FM1, 1PEX, 1XUC, 1XUD, 1XUR, 1YOU, 1ZTQ, 2D1N, 2E2D, 2OW9, 2OZR, 2PJT, 2YIG, 3ELM, 3I7G, 3I7I, 3KEC, 3KEJ, 3KEK, 3KRY, 3LJZ, 3O2X, 3TVC, 3WV1, 3WV2, 3WV3, 3ZXH, 456C, 4A7B, 4FU4, 4FVL, 4G0D, 4JP4, 4JPA, 4L19, 5BOT, 5BOY, 5BPA, 830C

Gene location (Human)
Chr.	Chromosome 11 (human)
Band	11q22.2	Start	102,942,995 bp
Band	11q22.2	End	102,955,732 bp

Gene location (Mouse)
Chr.	Chromosome 9 (mouse)
Band	9|9 A1	Start	7,272,514 bp
Band	9|9 A1	End	7,283,331 bp
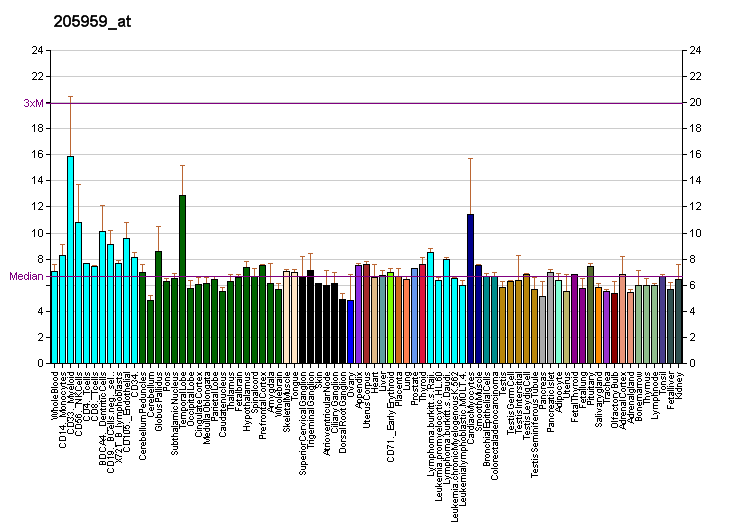
RNA expression pattern
Bgee	Human / Mouse (ortholog); Top expressed in: periodontal fiber; cartilage tissue; tibia; mucosa of paranasal sinus; trabecular bone; buccal mucosa cell; gonad; Achilles tendon; olfactory zone of nasal mucosa; gums / Top expressed in: body of femur; calvaria; tibiofemoral joint; stroma of bone marrow; olfactory epithelium; molar; ankle; fossa; lumbar spinal ganglion; epiphysis; More reference expression data
BioGPS	More reference expression data
Gene ontology
Molecular function	collagen binding; zinc ion binding; metal ion binding; peptidase activity; metalloendopeptidase activity; hydrolase activity; metallopeptidase activity; serine-type endopeptidase activity; calcium ion binding
Cellular component	extracellular matrix; extracellular region; extracellular space
Biological process	growth plate cartilage development; bone mineralization; bone morphogenesis; extracellular matrix disassembly; endochondral ossification; proteolysis; cartilage development; collagen catabolic process; extracellular matrix organization; response to amyloid-beta
Sources:Amigo / QuickGO
Orthologs
Databases	NCBI: entry; OMA: entry
Species	Human	Mouse
Entrez	4322	17386
Ensembl	ENSG00000137745	ENSMUSG00000050578
UniProt	P45452	P33435
RefSeq (mRNA)	NM_002427	NM_008607
RefSeq (protein)	NP_002418	NP_032633
Location (UCSC)	Chr 11: 102.94 – 102.96 Mb	Chr 9: 7.27 – 7.28 Mb
PubMed search
- Wikidata
View/Edit Human	View/Edit Mouse

Collagenase 3 is an enzyme that in humans is encoded by the MMP13 gene. It is a member of the matrix metalloproteinase (MMP) family. Like most MMPs, it is secreted as an inactive pro-form. MMP-13 has a predicted molecular weight around 54 kDa. It is activated once the pro-domain is cleaved, leaving an active enzyme composed of the catalytic domain and the hemopexin-like domain PDB: 1PEX. Although the actual mechanism has not been described, the hemopexin domain participates in collagen degradation, the catalytic domain alone being particularly inefficient in collagen degradation. During embryonic development, MMP-13 is expressed in the skeleton as required for restructuring the collagen matrix for bone mineralization. In pathological situations it is highly overexpressed; this occurs in human carcinomas, rheumatoid arthritis and osteoarthritis.

Proteins of the matrix metalloproteinase (MMP) family are involved in the breakdown of extracellular matrix in normal physiological processes, such as embryonic development, reproduction, and tissue remodeling, as well as in disease processes, such as arthritis and metastasis. Most MMPs are secreted as inactive proproteins which are activated when cleaved by extracellular proteinases. The protein encoded by this gene cleaves type II collagen more efficiently than types I and III. It may be involved in articular cartilage turnover and cartilage pathophysiology associated with osteoarthritis. The gene is part of a cluster of MMP genes which localize to chromosome 11q22.3.

== Regulation ==
Transcriptional regulation of MMP-13 is tightly controlled due to its potent proteolytic capacity. There are several binding domains for various transcription factors including AP-1, PEA-3 and OSE-2 as well as a sequence with homology to a TGF-β inhibitory element (TIE). Moreover, several cytokines and growth factors have been demonstrated to affect Mmp13 gene expression, including parathyroid hormone, IGF-1, TGF-β, hepatocyte growth factor and many inflammatory cytokines such as IL-1α and IL-1β.

The upstream regulatory region of the Mmp13 gene contains a number of transcription factor binding sites but it was recently discovered that there is a conserved forkhead response element (FHRE) consensus sequence for FOXO3a in the human, mouse and rat Mmp13 promoter. Endogenous FOXO3a activation results in marked upregulation of Mmp13 expression which is capable of promoting extracellular matrix degradation and apoptotic cell death.

== Clinical Relevance ==
MMP-13 has long been a protein of interest in the context of osteoarthritis and rheumatoid arthritis.

The role of MMP-13 has also been thoroughly examined in atherosclerosis, specifically in potentially reducing the collagen content of the fibrous cap.

== Inhibitors ==
- BI-4394
- CL82198
- CTS-1027
- CP544439
- DB04760
- ITZ-1
- Prinomastat
- SD-7300
- T-26c
