= TIMP1 =

Protein-coding gene in the species Homo sapiens

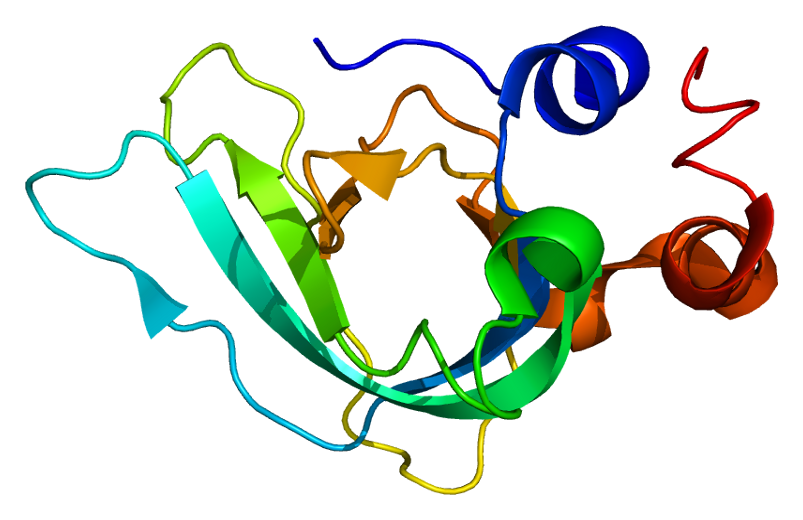

Identifiers
- Aliases: TIMP1, CLGI, EPA, EPO, HCI, TIMP, TIMP-1, TIMP metallopeptidase inhibitor 1
- External IDs: OMIM: 305370; MGI: 98752; GeneCards: TIMP1
Available structures
PDB	Ortholog search: PDBe RCSB
PDB	List of PDB id codes 1D2B, 1OO9, 1UEA, 2J0T, 3MA2, 3V96

Gene location (Human)
Chr.	X chromosome (human)
Band	Xp11.3	Start	47,582,408 bp
Band	Xp11.3	End	47,586,789 bp

Gene location (Mouse)
Chr.	X chromosome (mouse)
Band	X A1.3|X 16.38 cM	Start	20,736,405 bp
Band	X A1.3|X 16.38 cM	End	20,740,974 bp
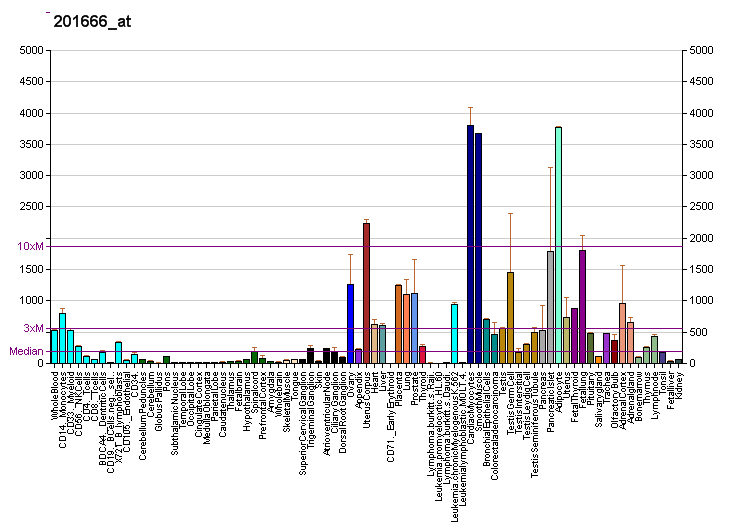
RNA expression pattern
Bgee	Human / Mouse (ortholog); Top expressed in: right coronary artery; gallbladder; left coronary artery; Descending thoracic aorta; ascending aorta; stromal cell of endometrium; islet of Langerhans; pericardium; beta cell; right adrenal gland / Top expressed in: calvaria; endothelial cell of lymphatic vessel; stroma of bone marrow; body of femur; ankle joint; ankle; gastrula; lactiferous gland; fossa; umbilical cord; More reference expression data
BioGPS	More reference expression data
Gene ontology
Molecular function	peptidase inhibitor activity; enzyme inhibitor activity; cytokine activity; metal ion binding; protease binding; protein binding; metalloendopeptidase inhibitor activity; growth factor activity; zinc ion binding
Cellular component	extracellular matrix; extracellular region; basement membrane; extracellular exosome; platelet alpha granule lumen; extracellular space; endoplasmic reticulum lumen; collagen
Biological process	response to cytokine; negative regulation of peptidase activity; ageing; response to peptide hormone; platelet degranulation; wound healing; negative regulation of apoptotic process; extracellular matrix disassembly; negative regulation of trophoblast cell migration; response to organic substance; cell activation; cartilage development; regulation of integrin-mediated signaling pathway; positive regulation of cell population proliferation; response to hormone; negative regulation of membrane protein ectodomain proteolysis; negative regulation of endopeptidase activity; negative regulation of catalytic activity; negative regulation of metallopeptidase activity; post-translational protein modification; regulation of signaling receptor activity; connective tissue replacement involved in inflammatory response wound healing; cytokine-mediated signaling pathway
Sources:Amigo / QuickGO
Orthologs
Databases	NCBI: entry; OMA: entry
Species	Human	Mouse
Entrez	7076	21857
Ensembl	ENSG00000102265	ENSMUSG00000001131
UniProt	P01033; Q6FGX5	P12032
RefSeq (mRNA)	NM_003254	NM_001044384; NM_001294280; NM_011593
RefSeq (protein)	NP_003245; NP_003245.1	NP_001037849; NP_001281209; NP_035723
Location (UCSC)	Chr X: 47.58 – 47.59 Mb	Chr X: 20.74 – 20.74 Mb
PubMed search
- Wikidata
View/Edit Human	View/Edit Mouse

TIMP metallopeptidase inhibitor 1, also known as TIMP1, a tissue inhibitor of metalloproteinases, is a two-domain glycoprotein with a molecular weight of 28 kDa. TIMP1 is expressed in several tissues of organisms.

This protein is a member of the TIMP family. The glycoprotein is a natural inhibitor of the matrix metalloproteinases (MMPs), a group of peptidases involved in degradation of the extracellular matrix. In addition to its inhibitory role against most of the known MMPs, the encoded protein is able to promote cell proliferation in a wide range of cell types, and may also have an anti-apoptotic function.

== Function ==
TIMP1 is an inhibitory molecule that regulates matrix metalloproteinases (MMPs) and disintegrin-metalloproteinases (ADAMs and ADAMTSs) through binding of the TIMP1 N-terminal domain to the metalloproteinase active site. It has also been suggested that the C-terminal domain of TIMP1 can bind to the inactive precursors pro-MMP-2 and pro-MMP-9. In regulating MMPs, TIMP1 plays a crucial role in extracellular matrix (ECM) composition, wound healing, and pregnancy.

The dysregulated activity of TIMP1 has been implicated in inflammation, cancer, and fibrosis. In pregnancy, TIMP1 plays a regulatory role in the process of implantation, particularly the cytotrophoblast invasion of the uterine endometrium. Additionally, it plays a role in regulating the transcriptional profile of fetal and placental tissues associated with the early stages of pregnancy. Studies attribute this role to a mechanism involving the chromatin structure at the TIMP1 promoter region, implicating new pharmaceutical possibilities for the therapeutic regulation of TIMP1. Accordingly, TIMP1 can be manipulated in vitro using techniques, like the TIMP1 knock-out.

== Cell-surface receptor binding ==
While traditionally reported for its protease-inhibiting ability, the C-terminal domain of TIMP1 has been shown to bind to cell-surface receptors including the tetraspanins CD63 and CD82. These interactions can activate downstream signaling pathways including the MAPK pathway.

== Other names ==
- Erythroid potentiating activity (EPA)
- Human collagenase inhibitor (HCI)

== Regulation of TIMP expression ==
Transcription of this gene is highly inducible in response to many cytokines and hormones. In addition, the expression from some but not all inactive X chromosomes suggests that this gene inactivation is polymorphic in human females. This gene is located within intron 6 of the synapsin I gene and is transcribed in the opposite direction.

In adrenocortical cells the trophic hormone ACTH induces expression of TIMP-1 and the increase in TIMP expression is also associated with decreased collagenase activity.

Increased expression of TIMP1 has been found to be associated with worse prognosis of various tumors, such as laryngeal carcinoma or melanoma.

== See also ==
- TIMP2, TIMP3, TIMP4
