= Cipemastat =

Names
- Preferred IUPAC name (2R,3R)-3-(Cyclopentylmethyl)-N-hydroxy-4-oxo-4-(piperidin-1-yl)-2-[(3,4,4-trimethyl-2,5-dioxoimidazolidin-1-yl)methyl]butanamide

Identifiers
CAS Number	190648-49-8
3D model (JSmol)	Interactive image
ChEMBL	ChEMBL115653
ChemSpider	8000097
IUPHAR/BPS	6466
PubChem CID	9824350
UNII	02HQ4TYQ60
CompTox Dashboard (EPA)	DTXSID10897569
- InChI: InChI=1S/C22H36N4O5/c1-22(2)20(29)26(21(30)24(22)3)14-17(18(27)23-31)16(13-15-9-5-6-10-15)19(28)25-11-7-4-8-12-25/h15-17,31H,4-14H2,1-3H3,(H,23,27)/t16-,17+/m1/s1 Key: GFUITADOEPNRML-SJORKVTESA-N
- SMILES: CC1(C)NC(=O)N(C[C@@H]([C@@H](CC2CCCC2)C(=O)N3CCCCC3)C(=O)NO)C1=O

Properties
Chemical formula	C_{22}H_{36}N_{4}O_{5}
Molar mass	436.553 g·mol^{−1}
- Except where otherwise noted, data are given for materials in their standard state (at 25 °C [77 °F], 100 kPa). verify (what is ?) Infobox references

Cipemastat (rINN, also known as Ro 32-3555 and by the tentative trade name Trocade) is a selective inhibitor of matrix metalloproteinase-1 that has been investigated as an anti-arthritis agent. It is being developed by Roche.
