= TIMP2 =

Protein-coding gene in the species Homo sapiens

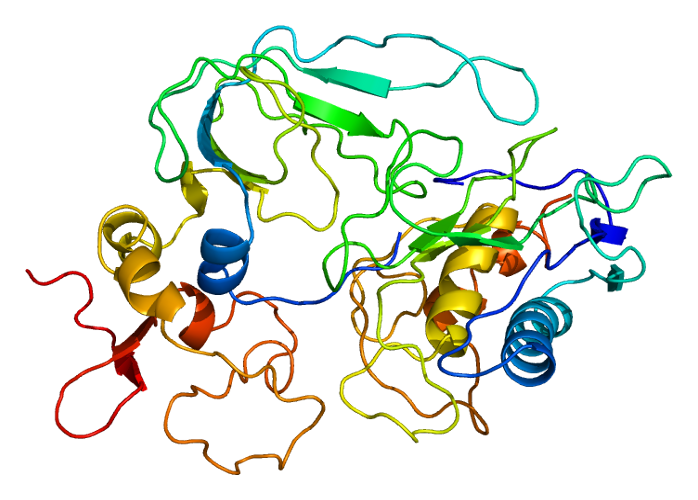
Available structures
PDB	Ortholog search: PDBe RCSB
PDB	List of PDB id codes 1BR9, 1GXD, 2TMP, 4ILW

Identifiers
- Aliases: TIMP2, CSC-21K, DDC8, TIMP metallopeptidase inhibitor 2
- External IDs: OMIM: 188825; MGI: 98753; HomoloGene: 2444; GeneCards: TIMP2; OMA:TIMP2 - orthologs

Gene location (Human)
Chr.	Chromosome 17 (human)
Band	17q25.3	Start	78,852,977 bp
Band	17q25.3	End	78,925,387 bp

Gene location (Mouse)
Chr.	Chromosome 11 (mouse)
Band	11 E2|11 83.09 cM	Start	118,191,895 bp
Band	11 E2|11 83.09 cM	End	118,246,566 bp
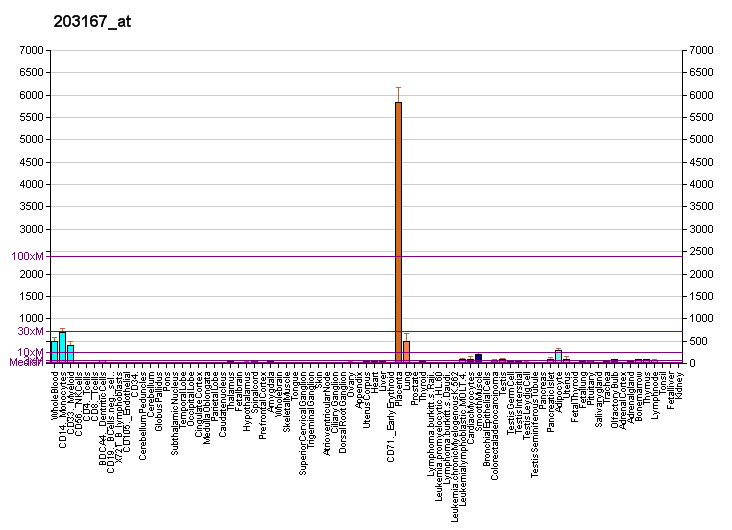
RNA expression pattern
Bgee	Human / Mouse (ortholog); Top expressed in: tendon of biceps brachii; synovial joint; stromal cell of endometrium; tibia; urethra; Descending thoracic aorta; trigeminal ganglion; ascending aorta; right coronary artery; visceral pleura / Top expressed in: calvaria; stroma of bone marrow; ankle; skin of external ear; body of femur; ventromedial nucleus; subiculum; anterior amygdaloid area; endothelial cell of lymphatic vessel; retinal pigment epithelium; More reference expression data
BioGPS	More reference expression data
Gene ontology
Molecular function	peptidase inhibitor activity; enzyme inhibitor activity; metal ion binding; integrin binding; protein binding; protease binding; metalloendopeptidase inhibitor activity; zinc ion binding
Cellular component	growth cone; extracellular region; cell surface; soma; neuron projection; extracellular exosome; extracellular matrix; extracellular space; specific granule lumen; tertiary granule lumen; ficolin-1-rich granule lumen; collagen-containing extracellular matrix
Biological process	negative regulation of proteolysis; response to cytokine; negative regulation of peptidase activity; positive regulation of adenylate cyclase activity; ageing; extracellular matrix disassembly; negative regulation of Ras protein signal transduction; central nervous system development; positive regulation of neuron differentiation; response to hormone; negative regulation of membrane protein ectodomain proteolysis; positive regulation of MAPK cascade; negative regulation of cell population proliferation; negative regulation of mitotic cell cycle; regulation of Rap protein signal transduction; negative regulation of endopeptidase activity; neutrophil degranulation; negative regulation of metallopeptidase activity; response to organic substance
Sources:Amigo / QuickGO
Orthologs
Species	Human	Mouse
Entrez	7077	21858
Ensembl	ENSG00000035862	ENSMUSG00000017466
UniProt	P16035	P25785
RefSeq (mRNA)	NM_003255	NM_011594
RefSeq (protein)	NP_003246	n/a
Location (UCSC)	Chr 17: 78.85 – 78.93 Mb	Chr 11: 118.19 – 118.25 Mb
PubMed search
- Wikidata
View/Edit Human	View/Edit Mouse

Tissue inhibitor of metalloproteinases 2 (TIMP2) is a gene and a corresponding protein. The gene is a member of the TIMP gene family. The protein is thought to be a metastasis suppressor.

== Function ==
The proteins encoded by this gene family are natural inhibitors of the matrix metalloproteinases (MMP), a group of peptidases involved in degradation of the extracellular matrix. In addition to an inhibitory role against metalloproteinases, the encoded protein has a unique role among TIMP family members in its ability to directly suppress the proliferation of endothelial cells. As a result, the encoded protein may be critical to the maintenance of tissue homeostasis by suppressing the proliferation of quiescent tissues in response to angiogenic factors, and by inhibiting protease activity in tissues undergoing remodelling of the extracellular matrix. TIMP2 functions as both an MMP inhibitor and an activator. TIMPs inhibit active MMPs, but different TIMPs inhibit different MMPs better than others. For example, TIMP-1 inhibits MMP-7, MMP-9, MMP-1 and MMP-3 better than TIMP-2, and TIMP-2 inhibits MMP-2 more effectively than other TIMPs.

In melanocytic cells TIMP2 gene expression may be regulated by MITF.

A recent discovery is that TIMP2 plays an important role in hippocampal function and cognitive function. It plays a critical role in the benefit conferred to old mice when given human umbilical cord blood. Its role in hippocampal function was later described to be related to its interactions with the extracellular matrix to regulate neurogenesis and dendritic spines plasticity.

== Interactions ==
TIMP2 has been shown to interact with:

- MMP14 and
- MMP2.

== See also ==
- TIMP1, TIMP3, TIMP4
