= Batimastat =

Chemical compound

Clinical data
- Pregnancy category: N/A
- Routes of administration: Injection into pleural space or abdomen
- ATC code: none

Legal status
- Legal status: Never marketed

Identifiers
- IUPAC name: (2R,3S)-N^{4}-Hydroxy-2-isobutyl-N^{1}-[(2S)-1-(methylamino)-1-oxo-3-phenyl-2-propanyl]-3-[(2-thienylsulfanyl)methyl]succinamide
- CAS Number: 130370-60-4
- PubChem CID: 5362422
- IUPHAR/BPS: 5145
- DrugBank: DB03880
- ChemSpider: 4515033
- UNII: BK349F52C9
- KEGG: D03061
- ChEBI: CHEBI:195398
- ChEMBL: ChEMBL279786
- CompTox Dashboard (EPA): DTXSID20156497
- ECHA InfoCard: 100.222.897

Chemical and physical data
- Formula: C_{23}H_{31}N_{3}O_{4}S_{2}
- Molar mass: 477.64 g·mol^{−1}
- 3D model (JSmol): Interactive image
- SMILES: O=C(NC)[C@@H](NC(=O)[C@@H]([C@@H](C(=O)NO)CSc1sccc1)CC(C)C)Cc2ccccc2
- InChI: InChI=1S/C23H31N3O4S2/c1-15(2)12-17(18(22(28)26-30)14-32-20-10-7-11-31-20)21(27)25-19(23(29)24-3)13-16-8-5-4-6-9-16/h4-11,15,17-19,30H,12-14H2,1-3H3,(H,24,29)(H,25,27)(H,26,28)/t17-,18+,19+/m1/s1; Key:XFILPEOLDIKJHX-QYZOEREBSA-N

Batimastat (mnemonic: batty-mustard) (INN/USAN, codenamed BB-94) is a drug that was invented by Laurie Hines of British Biotech (now Vernalis). It is an antimetastatic drug that belongs to the family of drugs called angiogenesis inhibitors. It acts as a matrix metalloproteinase inhibitor (MMPI) by mimicking natural MMPI peptides. Dan Lednicer wrote about this compound in book #6 of his organic drug synthesis series.

Batimastat was the first MMPI that went into clinical trials. First results of a Phase I trial appeared in 1994. The drug reached Phase III but was never marketed; mainly because it couldn't be administered orally (as opposed to the newer and chemically similar MMPI marimastat), and injection into the peritoneum caused peritonitis.

It is well-known that other methods of administration include transdermal (skin lotion) as well as rectal suppositories.
