= Prinomastat =

Chemical compound

Clinical data
- ATC code: None

Pharmacokinetic data
- Elimination half-life: 1–5 hours

Identifiers
- IUPAC name: (3S)-N-Hydroxy-2,2-dimethyl-4-(4-pyridin-4-yloxyphenyl)sulfonylthiomorpholine-3-carboxamide
- CAS Number: 192329-42-3
- PubChem CID: 466151
- IUPHAR/BPS: 6505
- ChemSpider: 409762
- UNII: 10T6626FRK
- ChEMBL: ChEMBL75094
- CompTox Dashboard (EPA): DTXSID3043946

Chemical and physical data
- Formula: C_{18}H_{21}N_{3}O_{5}S_{2}
- Molar mass: 423.50 g·mol^{−1}
- 3D model (JSmol): Interactive image
- SMILES: CC1([C@@H](N(CCS1)S(=O)(=O)C2=CC=C(C=C2)OC3=CC=NC=C3)C(=O)NO)C
- InChI: InChI=1S/C18H21N3O5S2/c1-18(2)16(17(22)20-23)21(11-12-27-18)28(24,25)15-5-3-13(4-6-15)26-14-7-9-19-10-8-14/h3-10,16,23H,11-12H2,1-2H3,(H,20,22)/t16-/m0/s1; Key:YKPYIPVDTNNYCN-INIZCTEOSA-N

Prinomastat (code name AG-3340) is a matrix metalloproteinase (MMP) inhibitor with specific selectivity for MMPs 2, 3, 9, 13, and 14. Investigations have been carried out to determine whether the inhibition of these MMPs is able to block tumour metastasis by preventing MMP degradation of the extracellular matrix proteins and angiogenesis. Prinomastat underwent a Phase III trial to investigate its effectiveness against non-small cell lung cancer (NSCLC), in combination with gemcitabine chemotherapy. However, it was discovered that Prinomastat did not improve the outcome of chemotherapy in advanced non-small-cell lung cancer.
