= Marimastat =

Chemical compound

Clinical data
- Routes of administration: By mouth
- ATC code: None

Legal status
- Legal status: Development terminated?

Identifiers
- IUPAC name: N-[2,2-Dimethyl-1-(methylcarbamoyl)propyl]-2-[hydroxy-(hydroxycarbamoyl)methyl]-4- methyl-pentanamide
- CAS Number: 154039-60-8
- PubChem CID: 119031
- IUPHAR/BPS: 5220
- DrugBank: DB00786
- ChemSpider: 106358
- UNII: D5EQV23TDS
- ChEMBL: ChEMBL279785
- PDB ligand: 097 (PDBe, RCSB PDB)
- CompTox Dashboard (EPA): DTXSID20165524

Chemical and physical data
- Formula: C_{15}H_{29}N_{3}O_{5}
- Molar mass: 331.413 g·mol^{−1}
- 3D model (JSmol): Interactive image
- SMILES: O=C(NO)[C@@H](O)[C@H](C(=O)N[C@H](C(=O)NC)C(C)(C)C)CC(C)C
- InChI: InChI=1S/C15H29N3O5/c1-8(2)7-9(10(19)13(21)18-23)12(20)17-11(14(22)16-6)15(3,4)5/h8-11,19,23H,7H2,1-6H3,(H,16,22)(H,17,20)(H,18,21)/t9-,10+,11-/m1/s1; Key:OCSMOTCMPXTDND-OUAUKWLOSA-N

Marimastat was a proposed antineoplastic drug developed by British Biotech. It acted as a broad-spectrum matrix metalloproteinase inhibitor.

Marimastat performed poorly in clinical trials, and development was terminated. This may be, however, a result of targeting cancer at too late of a stage. This is supported by the fact that MMP inhibitors have more recently been shown in animal models to be more effective in earlier stages of cancers. (Effects of angiogenesis inhibitors on multistage carcinogenesis in mice. Science 284, 808–812. Bergers, G., Javaherian, K., Lo, K.-M., Folkman, J., and Hanahan, D. (1999)).

== See also ==
- Batimastat
