= Ilomastat =

GM6001

Names
- Preferred IUPAC name (3R)-N^{1}-Hydroxy-N^{4}-{(1S)-1-[(1H-indol-3-yl)methyl]-2-(methylamino)-2-oxoethyl}-3-(2-methylpropyl)butanediamide
- Other names Galardin, GM6001

Identifiers
CAS Number	142880-36-2
3D model (JSmol)	Interactive image
Abbreviations	GM6
ChEBI	CHEBI:137236
ChemSpider	117009
DrugBank	DB02255
MeSH	GM6001
PubChem CID	132519
UNII	I0403ML141
CompTox Dashboard (EPA)	DTXSID0046353
- InChI: InChI=1S/C20H28N4O4/c1-12(2)8-13(10-18(25)24-28)19(26)23-17(20(27)21-3)9-14-11-22-16-7-5-4-6-15(14)16/h4-7,11-13,17,22,28H,8-10H2,1-3H3,(H,21,27)(H,23,26)(H,24,25)/t13-,17+/m1/s1
- SMILES: CC(C)C[C@H](CC(=O)NO)C(=O)N[C@@H](CC1=CNC2=CC=CC=C21)C(=O)NC

Properties
Chemical formula	C_{20}H_{28}N_{4}O_{4}
Molar mass	388.468 g·mol^{−1}
- Except where otherwise noted, data are given for materials in their standard state (at 25 °C [77 °F], 100 kPa). Infobox references

Ilomastat (INN; development code GM6001; proprietary name Galardin) is a broad-spectrum matrix metalloproteinase inhibitor.

This chemotherapy agent is considered to have application in skincare products for its antiaging properties.

Ilomastat is a member of the hydroxamic acid class of reversible metallopeptidase inhibitors. The anionic state of the hydroxamic acid group forms a bidentate complex with the active site zinc.

Examples of enzymes that ilomastat inhibit include rabbit MMP9, thermolysin, peptide deformylase, and anthrax lethal factor endopeptidase (LF) produced by the bacterium Bacillus anthracis.
