= MMP9 =

Protein-coding gene in the species Homo sapiens

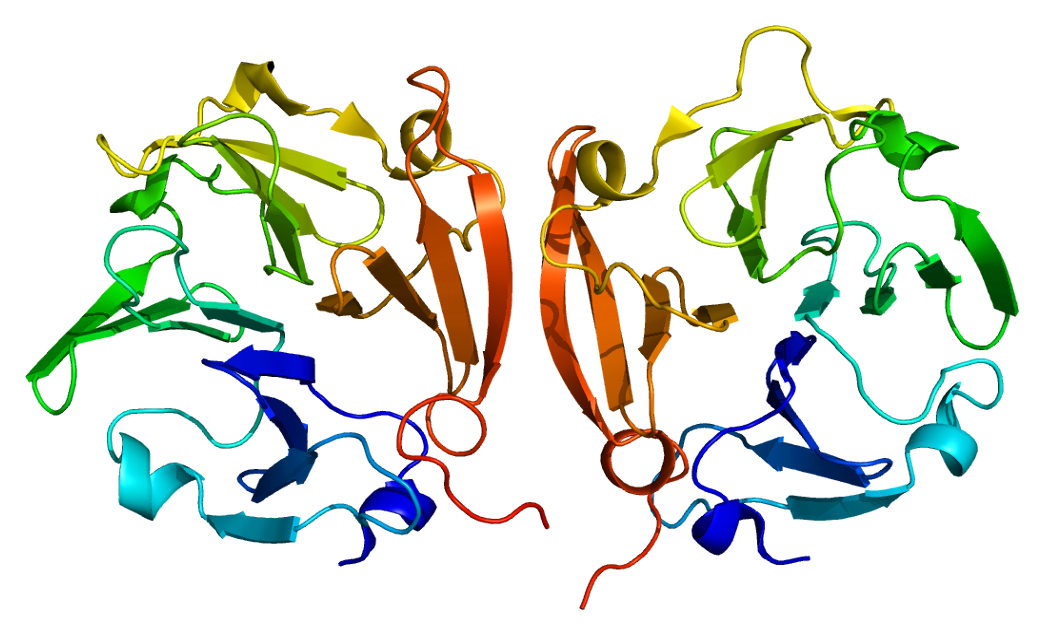

Identifiers
- Aliases: MMP9, CLG4B, GELB, MANDP2, MMP-9, 92 kDa type IV collagenase, 92 kDa gelatinase, gelatinase B, matrix metallopeptidase 9
- External IDs: OMIM: 120361; MGI: 97011; GeneCards: MMP9
Available structures
PDB	Ortholog search: PDBe RCSB
PDB	List of PDB id codes 1GKC, 1GKD, 1ITV, 1L6J, 2OVX, 2OVZ, 2OW0, 2OW1, 2OW2, 4H1Q, 4H2E, 4H3X, 4H82, 4HMA, 4JIJ, 4JQG, 4WZV, 4XCT, 5CUH, 5I12
Enzyme activity
EC #	BRENDA	ExPASy	KEGG	MetaCyc
3.4.24.35	↗	↗	↗	↗

Gene location (Human)
Chr.	Chromosome 20 (human)
Band	20q13.12	Start	46,008,908 bp
Band	20q13.12	End	46,016,561 bp

Gene location (Mouse)
Chr.	Chromosome 2 (mouse)
Band	2 H3|2 85.27 cM	Start	164,782,700 bp
Band	2 H3|2 85.27 cM	End	164,797,770 bp
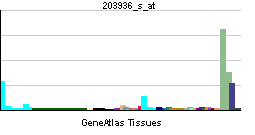
RNA expression pattern
Bgee	Human / Mouse (ortholog); Top expressed in: periodontal fiber; trabecular bone; tibia; bone marrow; bone marrow cell; appendix; blood; cartilage tissue; skin of hip; lymph node / Top expressed in: granulocyte; tibiofemoral joint; body of femur; Dermatocranium; mandible; bones of pectoral girdle; molar; ankle; rib; trophoblast giant cell; More reference expression data
BioGPS	More reference expression data
Gene ontology
Molecular function	collagen binding; zinc ion binding; metal ion binding; peptidase activity; protein binding; identical protein binding; hydrolase activity; metallopeptidase activity; endopeptidase activity; serine-type endopeptidase activity; metalloendopeptidase activity
Cellular component	extracellular matrix; extracellular exosome; extracellular space; tertiary granule lumen; ficolin-1-rich granule lumen; extracellular region; collagen-containing extracellular matrix
Biological process	skeletal system development; negative regulation of cation channel activity; positive regulation of protein phosphorylation; endodermal cell differentiation; negative regulation of cysteine-type endopeptidase activity involved in apoptotic signaling pathway; ossification; negative regulation of intrinsic apoptotic signaling pathway; ephrin receptor signaling pathway; extracellular matrix disassembly; negative regulation of apoptotic process; proteolysis; macrophage differentiation; positive regulation of keratinocyte migration; positive regulation of apoptotic process; collagen catabolic process; positive regulation of release of cytochrome c from mitochondria; positive regulation of receptor binding; positive regulation of DNA binding; positive regulation of epidermal growth factor receptor signaling pathway; embryo implantation; leukocyte migration; positive regulation of vascular associated smooth muscle cell proliferation; extracellular matrix organization; positive regulation of cell migration; neutrophil degranulation; cellular response to reactive oxygen species; cellular response to cadmium ion; cytokine-mediated signaling pathway; regulation of neuroinflammatory response; negative regulation of epithelial cell differentiation involved in kidney development; response to amyloid-beta
Sources:Amigo / QuickGO
Orthologs
Databases	NCBI: entry; OMA: entry
Species	Human	Mouse
Entrez	4318	17395
Ensembl	ENSG00000100985	ENSMUSG00000017737
UniProt	P14780	P41245
RefSeq (mRNA)	NM_004994	NM_013599
RefSeq (protein)	NP_004985	NP_038627
Location (UCSC)	Chr 20: 46.01 – 46.02 Mb	Chr 2: 164.78 – 164.8 Mb
PubMed search
- Wikidata
View/Edit Human	View/Edit Mouse

Matrix metalloproteinase-9 (MMP-9), also known as 92 kDa type IV collagenase, 92 kDa gelatinase or gelatinase B (GELB), is a matrixin, a class of enzymes that belong to the zinc-metalloproteinases family involved in the degradation of the extracellular matrix. In humans the MMP9 gene encodes for a signal peptide, a propeptide, a catalytic domain with inserted three repeats of fibronectin type II domain followed by a C-terminal hemopexin-like domain.

== Function ==
Proteins of the matrix metalloproteinase (MMP) family are involved in the breakdown of extracellular matrix in normal physiological processes, such as embryonic development, reproduction, angiogenesis, bone development, wound healing, cell migration, learning and memory, as well as in pathological processes, such as asthma, arthritis, intracerebral hemorrhage, and metastasis. Most MMPs are secreted as inactive proproteins which are activated when cleaved by extracellular proteinases. The enzyme encoded by this gene degrades type IV and V collagens and other extracellular matrix proteins. Studies in rhesus monkeys suggest that the enzyme is involved in IL-8-induced mobilization of hematopoietic progenitor cells from bone marrow, and murine studies suggest a role in tumor-associated tissue remodeling.

Thrombospondins, intervertebral disc proteins, regulate interaction with matrix metalloproteinases (MMPs) 2 and 9, which are key effectors of ECM remodeling.

=== Neutrophil action ===
MMP9, along with elastase, appears to be a regulatory factor in neutrophil migration across the basement membrane.

MMP9 plays several important functions within neutrophil action, such as degrading extracellular matrix, activation of IL-1β, and cleavage of several chemokines. In a mouse model, MMP9 deficiency resulted in resistance to endotoxin shock, suggesting that MMP9 is important in sepsis.

=== Angiogenesis ===
MMP9 may play an important role in angiogenesis and neovascularization. For example, MMP9 appears to be involved in the remodeling associated with malignant glioma neovascularization. It is also a key regulator of growth plate formation- both growth plate angiogenesis and the generation of hypertrophic chondrocytes. Knock-out models of MMP9 result in delayed apoptosis, vascularization, and ossification of hypertrophic chondrocytes. Lastly, there is significant evidence that Gelatinase B is required for the recruitment of endothelial stem cells, a critical component of angiogenesis

=== Wound repair ===
MMP9 is greatly upregulated during human respiratory epithelial healing. Using a MMP9 deficient mouse model, it was seen that MMP9 coordinated epithelial wound repair and deficient mice were unable to remove the fibrinogen matrix during wound healing. When interacting with TGF-ß1, Gelatinase B also stimulates collagen contraction, aiding in wound closure.

== Structure ==
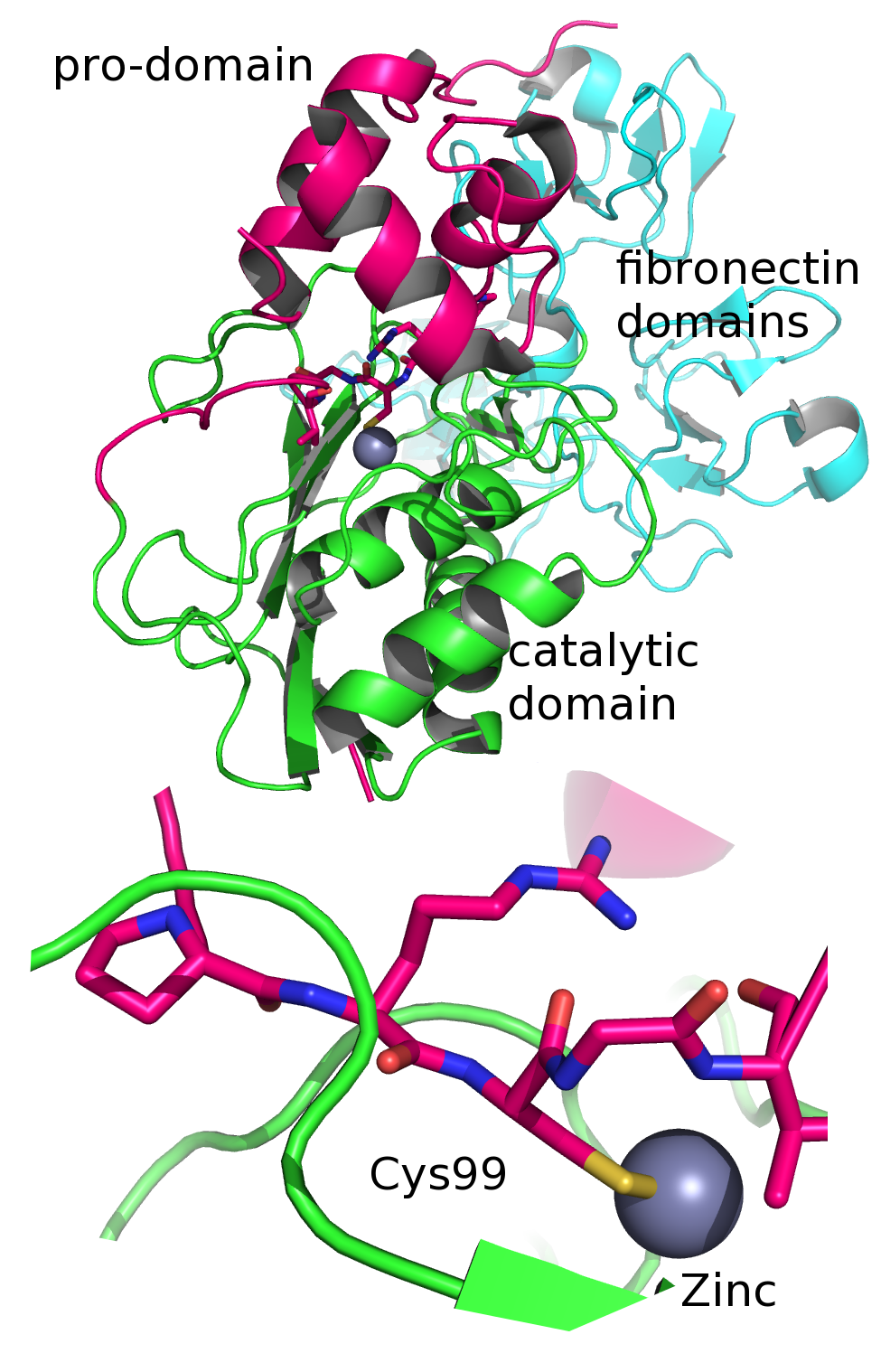
ProMMP9 (pro-peptide (red), catalytic domain (green) with fibronectin domains (cyan), with detail of the "cysteine switch" (from PDB entry 1L6J)

MMP9 is synthesized as preproenzyme of 707 amino-acid residues, including a 19 amino acid signal peptide and secreted as an inactive pro-MMP. The human MMP9 proenzyme consists of five domains. The amino-terminal propeptide, the zinc-binding catalytic domain and the carboxyl-terminal hemopexin-like domain are conserved. Its primary structure comprises several domain motifs. The propeptide domain is characterized by a conserved PRCGVPD sequence. The Cys within this sequence is known as the “cysteine switch”. It ligates the catalytic zinc to maintain the enzyme in an inactive state.

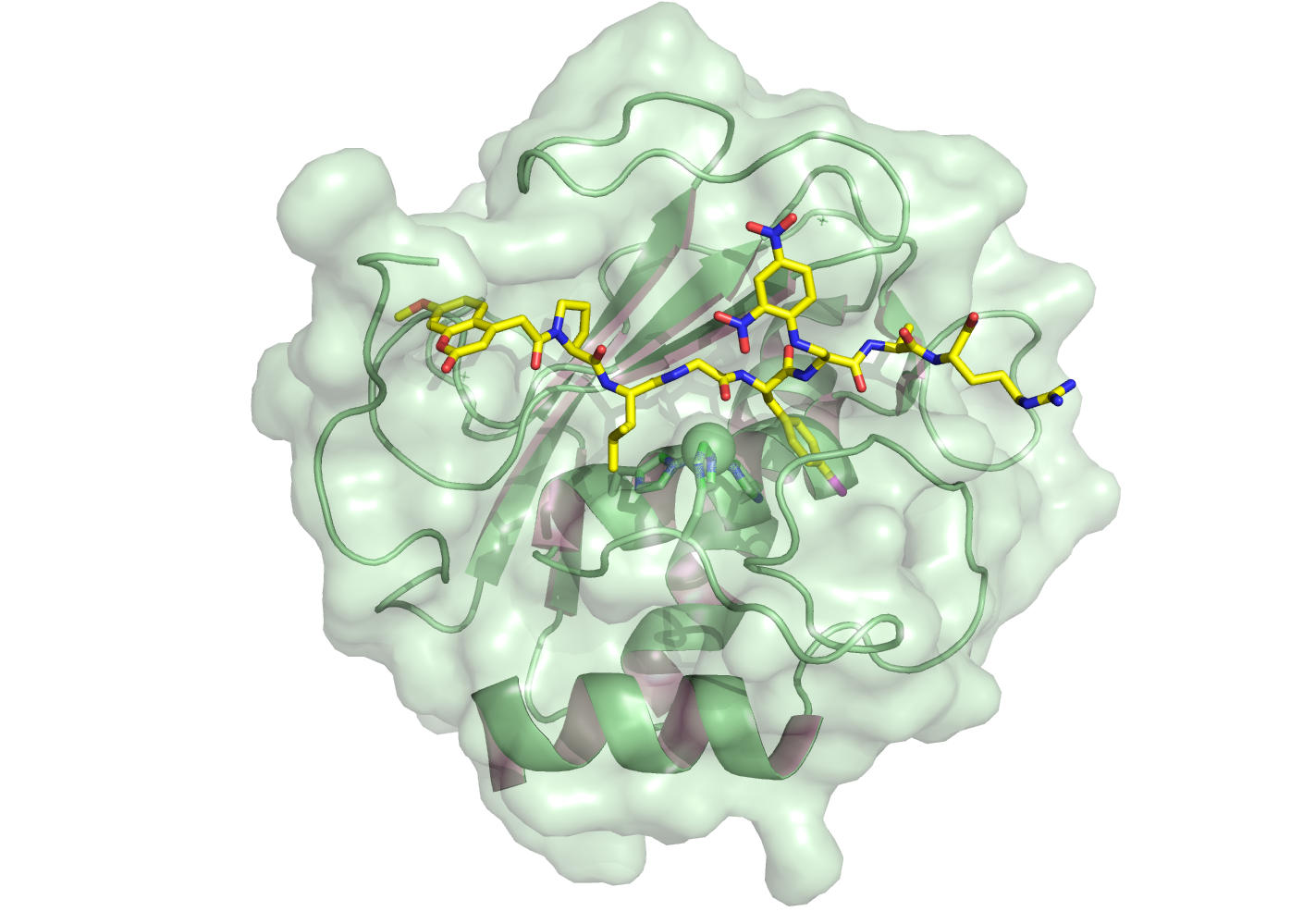
MMP-9 catalytic domain in complex with a fluorogenic synthetic peptidic substrate. From PDB entry 4JIJ.

Activation is achieved through an interacting protease cascade involving plasmin and stromelysin 1 (MMP-3). Plasmin generates active MMP-3 from its zymogen. Active MMP-3 cleaves the propeptide from the 92-kDa pro-MMP-9, yielding an 82-kDa enzymatically active enzyme. In the active enzyme a substrate, or a fluorogenic activity probe., replaces the propeptide in the enzyme active site where it is cleaved. The catalytic domain contains two zinc and three calcium atoms. The catalytic zinc is coordinated by three histidines from the conserved HEXXHXXGXXH binding motif. The other zinc atom and the three calcium atoms are structural. A conserved methionine, which forms a unique “Met-turn” structure categorizes MMP9 as a metzincin. Three type II fibronectin repeats are inserted in the catalytic domain, although these domains are omitted in most crystallographic structures of MMP9 in complex with inhibitors. The active form of MMP9 also contains a C-terminal hemopexin-like domain. This domain is ellipsoidal in shape, formed by four β-propeller blades and an α-helix. Each blade consists of four antiparallel β-strands arranged around a funnel-like tunnel that contains two calcium and two chloride ions. The hemopexin domain is important to facilitate the cleavage of triple helical interstitial collagens. .

== Clinical significance ==
MMP9 has been found to be associated with numerous pathological processes, including cancer, placental malaria, immunologic and cardiovascular diseases.

=== Arthritis ===
Elevated MMP9 levels can be found in the cases of rheumatoid arthritis and focal brain ischemia.

=== Cancer ===
One of MMP9's most widely associated pathologies is the relationship to cancer, due to its role in extracellular matrix remodeling and angiogenesis. For example, its increased expression was seen in a metastatic mammary cancer cell line. Gelatinase B plays a central role in tumor progression, from angiogenesis, to stromal remodeling, and ultimately metastasis. However, because of its physiologic function, it may be difficult to leverage Gelatinase B inhibition into cancer therapy modalities. However, Gelatinase B has been investigated in tumor metastasis diagnosis- Complexes of Gelatinase B/Tissue Inhibitors of Metalloproteinases are seen to be increased in gastrointestinal cancer and gynecologic malignancies

MMPs such as MMP9 can be involved in the development of several human malignancies, as degradation of collagen IV in basement membrane and extracellular matrix facilitates tumor progression, including invasion, metastasis, growth and angiogenesis.

=== Cardiovascular ===
MMP9 levels increase with the progression of idiopathic atrial fibrillation.

MMP9 has been found to be associated with the development of aortic aneurysms, and its disruption prevents the development of aortic aneurysms. Doxycycline suppresses the growth of aortic aneurysms in animal models through its inhibition of MMP9 reduces aortic inflammation in humans.

=== Pregnancy-associated malaria (Placental malaria) ===
A study on Ghanaian population showed that MMP-9 single nucleotide polymorphism 1562 C > T (rs3918242) was protective against placental malaria which suggests a possible role of MMP-9 in susceptibility to malaria.

=== Dry eye ===
Dry eye patients, especially with meibomian gland dysfunction exhibit higher levels of MMP-9.
