= Hemopexin family =

Hemopexin

Identifiers
- Symbol: Hemopexin
- Pfam: PF00045
- InterPro: IPR000585
- SMART: HX
- PROSITE: PDOC00023
- SCOP2: 1hxn / SCOPe / SUPFAM
- Membranome: 536
Available protein structures:
- Pfam: structures / ECOD
- PDB: RCSB PDB; PDBe; PDBj
- PDBsum: structure summary

The hemopexin family is a family of evolutionarily related proteins. Hemopexin-like repeats occur in vitronectin and some matrix metalloproteinases family (matrixins). The HX repeats of some matrixins bind tissue inhibitor of metallopeptidases (TIMPs).

Hemopexin (EC 3.2.1.35) is a serum glycoprotein that binds haem and transports it to the liver for breakdown and iron recovery, after which the free hemopexin returns to the circulation. Hemopexin prevents haem-mediated oxidative stress. Structurally hemopexin consists of two similar halves of approximately two hundred amino acid residues connected by a histidine-rich hinge region. Each half is itself formed by the repetition of a basic unit of some 35 to 45 residues. Hemopexin-like domains have been found in two other types of proteins, vitronectin, a cell adhesion and spreading factor found in plasma and tissues, and matrixins MMP-1, MMP-2, MMP-3, MMP-9, MMP-10, MMP-11, MMP-12, MMP-14, MMP-15 and MMP-16, members of the matrix metalloproteinase family that cleave extracellular matrix constituents. These zinc endopeptidases, which belong to MEROPS peptidase subfamily M10A, have a single hemopexin-like domain in their C-terminal section. It is suggested that the hemopexin domain facilitates binding to a variety of molecules and proteins, for example the HX repeats of some matrixins bind tissue inhibitor of metallopeptidases (TIMPs).

== Examples ==
Human genes encoding proteins containing hemopexin-like repeats include:

- HPX (hemopexin, the founding member of this protein family)
- matrix metalloproteinases: MMP1, MMP2, MMP3, MMP8, MMP9, MMP10, MMP11, MMP12, MMP13, MMP14, MMP15, MMP16, MMP17, MMP19, MMP20, MMP21, MMP24, MMP25, MMP27, MMP28,
- PRG4 (proteoglycan 4), and
- VTN (vitronectin).
