= Peptidoglycan binding domain =

Class of protein structural domains

Putative peptidoglycan binding domain
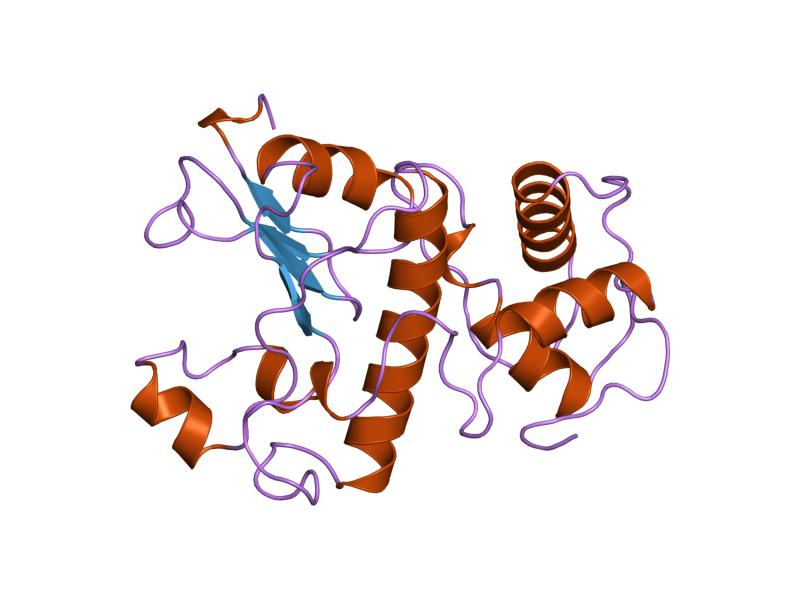
- Structure of Streptomyces Albus muramoyl-pentapeptide carboxypeptidase.

Identifiers
- Symbol: PG_binding_1
- Pfam: PF01471
- Pfam clan: CL0244
- InterPro: IPR002477
- SCOP2: 1lbu / SCOPe / SUPFAM
Available protein structures:
- Pfam: structures / ECOD
- PDB: RCSB PDB; PDBe; PDBj
- PDBsum: structure summary
- PDB: 1lbu :57-119 1lkgA:75-98 1l6jA:75-98 1su3B:27-91 1slm :33-91 1uc1A:32-95 1gxdB:70-101 1ck7A:70-101

Peptidoglycan binding domains have a general peptidoglycan binding function and a common core structure consisting of a closed, three-helical bundle with a left-handed twist. It is found at the N or C terminus of a variety of enzymes involved in bacterial cell wall degradation. Examples are:

- Muramoyl-pentapeptide carboxypeptidase (EC 3.4.17.8)
- N-acetylmuramoyl-L-alanine amidase cwlA precursor (cell wall hydrolase, autolysin, EC 3.5.1.28)
- Autolytic lysozyme (1,4-beta-N-acetylmuramidase, autolysin, EC 3.2.1.17)
- Membrane-bound lytic murein transglycosylase B
- Zinc-containing D-alanyl-D-alanine-cleaving carboxypeptidase, VanX.

Many of the proteins having this domain are as yet uncharacterised. However, some are known to belong to MEROPS peptidase family M15 (clan MD), subfamily M15A metallopeptidases. A number of the proteins belonging to subfamily M15A are non-peptidase homologues as they either have been found experimentally to be without peptidase activity, or lack amino acid residues that are believed to be essential for the catalytic activity.

Eukaryotic enzymes can contain structurally similar PGBD-like domains. Matrix metalloproteinases (MMP), which catalyse extracellular matrix degradation, have N-terminal domains that resemble PGBD. Examples are gelatinase A (MMP-2), which degrades type IV collagen, stromelysin-1 (MMP-3), which plays a role in arthritis and tumour invasion, and gelatinase B (MMP-9) secreted by neutrophils as part of the innate immune defence mechanism. Several MMPs are implicated in cancer progression, since degradation of the extracellular matrix is an essential step in the cascade of metastasis.

== Examples ==
Humans genes encoding proteins containing this domain include:

- MMP1, MMP2, MMP3, MMP7, MMP8, MMP9,
- MMP10, MMP12, MMP13, MMP14, MMP15, MMP16, MMP17, MMP19,
- MMP20, MMP21, MMP24, MMP25, MMP27, MMP28
