= PMM =

PMM may refer to:

- Makarov PMM, a variant of the Makarov PM pistol
- Pacific Meridional Mode
- Partido ng Manggagawa at Magsasaka, a Philippine political party
- Partidul Moldova Mare (Greater Moldova Party), a political party in Moldova
- Pectoralis minor muscle
- Perchloromethyl mercaptan, a synthetic intermediate
- Percona Monitoring and Management
- Permanent magnet motor
- Permanent Multipurpose Module of the International Space Station
- Perpetual motion machine
- Plant matrix metalloproteinase
- Predictive mean matching, a statistical imputation method
- Prime Minister of Malaysia (Malay: Perdana Menteri Malaysia)
- Printing and the Mind of Man
- Product Marketing Manager
- Public Money & Management, an academic journal
