= SMEP =

SMEP may refer to:

- Plant matrix metalloproteinase, also referred as SMEP1
- Standard model of elementary particles
- Supervisor mode execution protection, a security feature of some Intel CPUs

== Organisations ==
- SMEP Microfinance Bank
- Paris Evangelical Missionary Society (French: Société des missions évangéliques de Paris)
- Sony Music Entertainment Philippines, a defunct company
- Sony Music Entertainment Poland
- Society of Metallurgical Engineers of the Philippines, an engineering society
- Society of Mechanical Engineers of Pakistan; See Ghulam Ishaq Khan Institute of Engineering Sciences and Technology
- Society of Multivariate Experimental Psychology
