= Stromelysin 2 =

Identifiers
- EC no.: 3.4.24.22
- CAS no.: 140610-48-6

Databases
- IntEnz: IntEnz view
- BRENDA: BRENDA entry
- ExPASy: NiceZyme view
- KEGG: KEGG entry
- MetaCyc: metabolic pathway
- PRIAM: profile
- PDB structures: RCSB PDB PDBe PDBsum
Search
- PMC: articles
- PubMed: articles
- NCBI: proteins

Stromelysin 2 (EC 3.4.24.22, matrix metalloproteinase 10, transin 2, proteoglycanase 2) is an enzyme. This enzyme catalyses the following chemical reaction

Similar to stromelysin 1, but action on collagen types III, IV and V is weak

This enzyme belongs to the peptidase family M10 (interstitial collagenase family).
