= Matrix metalloproteinase =

Family of zinc-dependent metalloendopeptidases

Identifiers
- Symbol: MMP
- Pfam clan: CL0126
- InterPro: IPR021190
- Membranome: 317
Available protein structures:
- PDB: IPR021190
- AlphaFold: IPR021190

Matrix metalloproteinases (MMPs), also known as matrix metallopeptidases or matrixins, are metalloproteinases that are calcium-dependent zinc-containing endopeptidases; other family members are adamalysins, serralysins, and astacins. The MMPs belong to a larger family of proteases known as the metzincin superfamily.

Collectively, these enzymes are capable of degrading all kinds of extracellular matrix proteins, but also can process a number of bioactive molecules. They are known to be involved in the cleavage of cell surface receptors, the release of apoptotic ligands (such as the FAS ligand), and chemokine/cytokine inactivation. MMPs are also thought to play a major role in cell behaviors such as cell proliferation, migration (adhesion/dispersion), differentiation, angiogenesis, apoptosis, and host defense.

They were first described in vertebrates in 1962, including humans, but have since been found in invertebrates and plants. They are distinguished from other endopeptidases by their dependence on metal ions as cofactors, their ability to degrade extracellular matrix, and their specific evolutionary DNA sequence.

== History ==
MMPs were described initially by Jerome Gross and Charles Lapiere in 1962, who observed enzymatic activity (collagen triple helix degradation) during tadpole tail metamorphosis (by placing a tadpole tail in a collagen matrix plate). Therefore, the enzyme was named interstitial collagenase (MMP-1).

Later, it was purified from human skin (1968), and was recognized to be synthesized as a zymogen.

The "cysteine switch" was described in 1990.

== Structure ==
The MMPs have a common domain structure. The three common domains are the pro-peptide, the catalytic domain, and the haemopexin-like C-terminal domain, which is linked to the catalytic domain by a flexible hinge region.

=== The pro-peptide ===
The MMPs are initially synthesized as inactive zymogens with a pro-peptide domain that must be removed before the enzyme is active. The pro-peptide domain is part of the "cysteine switch." This contains a conserved cysteine residue that interacts with the zinc in the active site and prevents binding and cleavage of the substrate, keeping the enzyme in an inactive form. In the majority of the MMPs, the cysteine residue is in the conserved sequence PRCGxPD. Some MMPs have a prohormone convertase cleavage site (Furin-like) as part of this domain, which, when cleaved, activates the enzyme. MMP-23A and MMP-23B include a transmembrane segment in this domain.

=== The catalytic domain ===
X-ray crystallographic structures of several MMP catalytic domains have shown that this domain is an oblate sphere measuring 35 x 30 x 30 Å (3.5 × 3 x 3 nm). The active site is a 20 Å (2 nm) groove that runs across the catalytic domain. In the part of the catalytic domain forming the active site there is a catalytically important Zn^{2+} ion, which is bound by three histidine residues found in the conserved sequence HExxHxxGxxH. Hence, this sequence is a zinc-binding motif.

The gelatinases, such as MMP-2, incorporate Fibronectin type II modules inserted immediately before in the zinc-binding motif in the catalytic domain.

=== The hinge region ===
The catalytic domain is connected to the C-terminal domain by a flexible hinge or linker region. This is up to 75 amino acids long, and has no determinable structure.

=== The hemopexin-like C-terminal domain ===
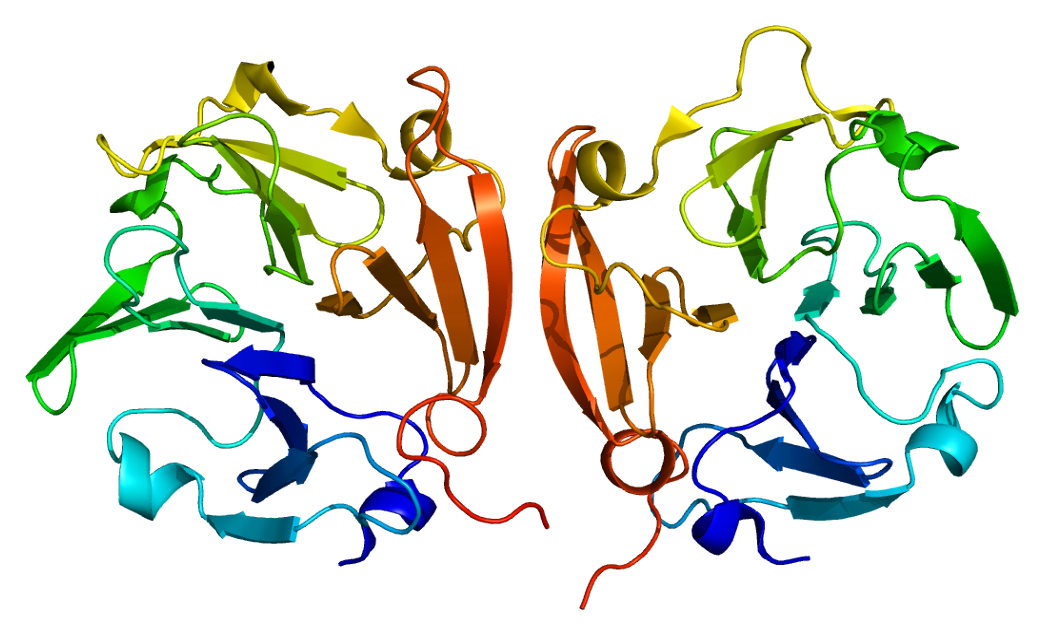
The hemopexin-like C-terminal domain of MMP9 PDB 1itv

The C-terminal domain has structural similarities to the serum protein hemopexin. It has a four-bladed β-propeller structure. β-Propeller structures provide a large flat surface that is thought to be involved in protein-protein interactions. This determines substrate specificity and is the site for interaction with TIMP's (tissue inhibitor of metalloproteinases). The hemopexin-like domain is absent in MMP-7, MMP-23, MMP-26, and the plant and nematode. The membrane-bound MMPs (MT-MMPs) are anchored to the plasma membrane via a transmembrane or a GPI-anchoring domain.

== Catalytic mechanism ==
There are three catalytic mechanisms published.

- In the first mechanism, Browner M.F. and colleagues proposed the base-catalysis mechanism, carried out by the conserved glutamate residue and the Zn^{2+} ion.
- In the second mechanism, the Matthews-mechanism, Kester and Matthews suggested an interaction between a water molecule and the Zn^{2+} ion during the acid-base catalysis.
- In the third mechanism, the Manzetti-mechanism, Manzetti Sergio and colleagues provided evidence that a coordination between water and zinc during catalysis was unlikely, and suggested a third mechanism wherein a histidine from the HExxHxxGxxH-motif participates in catalysis by allowing the Zn^{2+} ion to assume a quasi-penta coordinated state, via its dissociation from it. In this state, the Zn^{2+} ion is coordinated with the two oxygen atoms from the catalytic glutamic acid, the substrate's carbonyl oxygen atom, and the two histidine residues, and can polarize the glutamic acid's oxygen atom, proximate the scissile bond, and induce it to act as reversible electron donor. This forms an oxyanion transition state. At this stage, a water molecule acts on the dissociated scissile bond and completes the hydrolyzation of the substrate.

== Classification ==
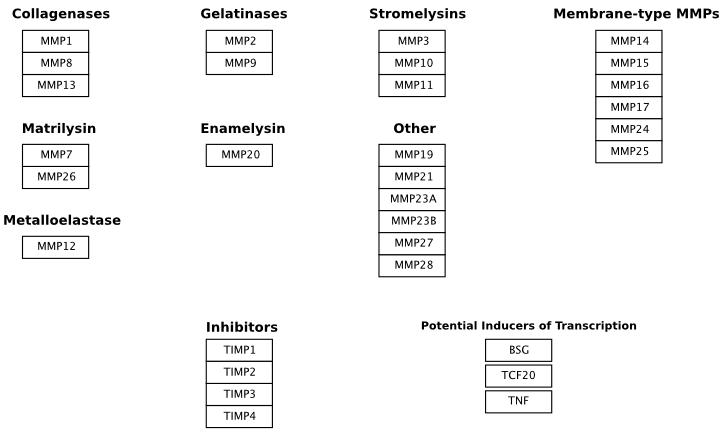
Functional classification of matrix metalloproteinases.

The MMPs can be subdivided in different ways.

=== Evolutionary ===
Use of bioinformatic methods to compare the primary sequences of the MMPs suggest the following evolutionary groupings of the MMPs:

- MMP-19
- MMPs 11, 14, 15, 16, and 17
- MMP-2 and MMP-9
- All the other MMPs

Analysis of the catalytic domains in isolation suggests that the catalytic domains evolved further once the major groups had differentiated, as is also indicated by the substrate specificities of the enzymes.

=== Functional ===
The most commonly used groupings (by researchers in MMP biology) are based partly on historical assessment of the substrate specificity of the MMP and partly on the cellular localization of the MMP. These groups are the collagenases, the gelatinases, the stromelysins, and the membrane-type MMPs (MT-MMPs).

- The collagenases are capable of degrading triple-helical fibrillar collagens into distinctive 3/4 and 1/4 fragments. These collagens are the major components of bone, cartilage and dentin, and MMPs are the only known mammalian enzymes capable of degrading them. The collagenases are No. 1, No. 8, No. 13, and No. 18. In addition, No. 14 has also been shown to cleave fibrillar collagen, and there is evidence that No. 2 is capable of collagenolysis. In MeSH, the current list of collagenases includes No. 1, No. 2, No. 8, No. 9, and No. 13. Collagenase No. 14 is present in MeSH but not listed as a collagenase, while No. 18 is absent from MeSH.
- The main substrates of the gelatinases are type IV collagen and gelatin, and these enzymes are distinguished by the presence of an additional domain inserted into the catalytic domain. This gelatin-binding region is positioned immediately before the zinc-binding motif, and forms a separate folding unit that does not disrupt the structure of the catalytic domain. The gelatinases are No. 2 and No. 9.
- The stromelysins display a broad ability to cleave extracellular matrix proteins but are unable to cleave the triple-helical fibrillar collagens. The three canonical members of this group are No. 3, No. 10, and No. 11.
- All six membrane-type MMPs (No. 14, No. 15, No. 16, No. 17, No. 24, and No. 25) have a furin cleavage site in the pro-peptide, which is a feature also shared by No. 11.

However, it is becoming increasingly clear that these divisions are somewhat artificial as there are a number of MMPs that do not fit into any of the traditional groups.

=== Genes ===
| Gene | Name | Aliases | Location | Description |
|---|---|---|---|---|
| MMP1 | Interstitial collagenase | CLG, CLGN | secreted | Substrates include Col I, II, III, VII, VIII, X, gelatin |
| MMP2 | Gelatinase-A, 72 kDa gelatinase | | secreted | Substrates include Gelatin, Col I, II, III, IV, Vii, X |
| MMP3 | Stromelysin 1 | CHDS6, MMP-3, SL-1, STMY, STMY1, STR1 | secreted | Substrates include Col II, IV, IX, X, XI, gelatin |
| MMP7 | Matrilysin, PUMP 1 | MMP-7, MPSL1, PUMP-1 | secreted | membrane associated through binding to cholesterol sulfate in cell membranes, substrates include: fibronectin, laminin, Col IV, gelatin |
| MMP8 | Neutrophil collagenase | CLG1, HNC, MMP-8, PMNL-CL | secreted | Substrates include Col I, II, III, VII, VIII, X, aggrecan, gelatin |
| MMP9 | Gelatinase-B, 92 kDa gelatinase | CLG4B, GELB, MANDP2, MMP-9 | secreted | Substrates include Gelatin, Col IV, V |
| MMP10 | Stromelysin 2 | SL-2, STMY2 | secreted | Substrates include Col IV, laminin, fibronectin, elastin |
| MMP11 | Stromelysin 3 | SL-3, ST3, STMY3 | secreted | MMP-11 shows more similarity to the MT-MMPs, is convertase-activatable and is secreted therefore usually associated to convertase-activatable MMPs. Substrates include Col IV, fibronectin, laminin, aggrecan |
| MMP12 | Macrophage metalloelastase | HME, ME, MME, MMP-12 | secreted | Substrates include elastin, fibronectin, Col IV |
| MMP13 | Collagenase 3 | CLG3, MANDP1, MMP-13 | secreted | Substrates include Col I, II, III, IV, IX, X, XIV, gelatin |
| MMP14 | MT1-MMP | MMP-14, MMP-X1, MT-MMP, MT-MMP 1, MT1-MMP, MT1MMP, MTMMP1, WNCHRS | membrane-associated | type-I transmembrane MMP; substrates include gelatin, fibronectin, laminin |
| MMP15 | MT2-MMP | MT2-MMP, MTMMP2, SMCP-2, MMP-15, MT2MMP | membrane-associated | type-I transmembrane MMP; substrates include gelatin, fibronectin, laminin |
| MMP16 | MT3-MMP | C8orf57, MMP-X2, MT-MMP2, MT-MMP3, MT3-MMP | membrane-associated | type-I transmembrane MMP; substrates include gelatin, fibronectin, laminin |
| MMP17 | MT4-MMP | MT4-MMP, MMP-17, MT4MMP, MTMMP4 | membrane-associated | glycosyl phosphatidylinositol-attached; substrates include fibrinogen, fibrin |
| MMP18 | Collagenase 4, xcol4, xenopus collagenase | | – | No known human orthologue |
| MMP19 | RASI-1, occasionally referred to as stromelysin-4 | MMP18, RASI-1, CODA | – | |
| MMP20 | Enamelysin | AI2A2, MMP-20 | secreted | |
| MMP21 | X-MMP | MMP-21, HTX7 | secreted | |
| MMP23A | CA-MMP | | membrane-associated | type-II transmembrane cysteine array |
| MMP23B | – | MIFR, MIFR-1, MMP22, MMP23A | membrane-associated | type-II transmembrane cysteine array |
| MMP24 | MT5-MMP | MMP-24, MMP25, MT-MMP 5, MT-MMP5, MT5-MMP, MT5MMP, MTMMP5 | membrane-associated | type-I transmembrane MMP |
| MMP25 | MT6-MMP | MMP-25, MMP20, MMP20A, MMPL1, MT-MMP 6, MT-MMP6, MT6-MMP, MT6MMP, MTMMP6 | membrane-associated | glycosyl phosphatidylinositol-attached |
| MMP26 | Matrilysin-2, endometase | | – | |
| MMP27 | MMP-22, C-MMP | MMP-27 | – | |
| MMP28 | Epilysin | EPILYSIN, MM28, MMP-25, MMP-28, MMP25 | secreted | Discovered in 2001 and given its name due to have been discovered in human keratinocytes. Unlike other MMPs this enzyme is constitutivley expressed in many tissues (Highly expressed in testis and at lower levels in lung, heart, brain, colon, intestine, placenta, salivary glands, uterus, skin). A threonine replaces proline in its cysteine switch (PRCGVTD). |

Matrix metalloproteinases combines with the metal binding protein, metallothionine; thus helping in metal binding mechanism.

== Function ==
The MMPs play an important role in tissue remodeling associated with various physiological or pathological processes such as morphogenesis, angiogenesis, tissue repair, cirrhosis, arthritis, and metastasis. MMP-2 and MMP-9 are thought to be important in metastasis. MMP-1 is thought to be important in rheumatoid arthritis and osteoarthritis. Recent data suggests an active role of MMPs in the pathogenesis of aortic aneurysms; excess MMPs degrade the structural proteins of the aortic wall. Dysregulation of the balance between MMPs and TIMPs is also a characteristic of acute and chronic cardiovascular diseases.

=== MMPs in wound healing ===
During wound healing, matrix metalloproteinases serve as a cleanup team, breaking down old tissues to make room for new ones. MMP-8 from neutrophils jumps in early to clear debris and accelerate skin healing overall, while MMP-1 from collagenases enhances keratinocyte movement across collagen fibers, helping to begin the repair after injury. MMP-13 then takes over to reduce the size of the wound and initiate re-epithelialization. Faster closure is achieved by drawing the wound edges together. Meanwhile, by activating MMP-9 and directing keratinocytes to migrate into the gap, the gelatinases MMP-2 speed up the healing process, while MMP-9 itself promotes cell migration everywhere within the wound.

Based on that, the stromelysins and other MMPs fine-tune the final stages. MMP-3 activates MMP-9 further and helps in the contraction of the wound, preventing scarring or tissue deformation, while MMP-10 secreted by keratinocytes at the wound edges to support the remodeling. MMP-7 ‘s main role is re-epithelialization, going through barriers like elastin and laminin allowing new skin cells to spread out, and MMP-12 manages the angiogenesis by making angiostatin, which controls new blood vessel growth preventing their overgrowth. These MMPs work together to balance the breakdown and rebuild, transforming the damaged tissue into healthy tissue.

=== Role of MMPs in disease ===
When MMPs are dysregulated, they can make diseases become more aggressive and worsen them instead of curing them. For instance, elevated levels of MMP-1 releases growth factors that enhance cancer metastasis, and in diabetic foot ulcers it slows healing by over-degrading tissues. MMP-8 levels rise in asthma, and in diabetes, it increases the chronic inflammation. MMP-13 drives joint damage in osteoarthritis, while MMP-2 and MMP-9 levels soar in colorectal cancer and heart diseases, carrying out abnormal changes in vessel walls and causing fibrosis. MMP-3 aids rheumatoid arthritis and spine issues, MMP-10 affects bone growth, MMP-7 increases in artery-clogging atherosclerosis, and MMP-12 cause immune cells to overreact, causing severe inflammation. Basically, unchecked MMP activity turns helpful tools into troublemakers.

== Activation ==
mutual activation of MMPs

All MMPs are synthesized in the latent form (Zymogen). They are secreted as proenzymes and require extracellular activation. They can be activated in vitro by many mechanisms including organomercurials, chaotropic agents, and other proteases.

== Inhibitors ==
The MMPs are inhibited by specific endogenous tissue inhibitor of metalloproteinases (TIMPs), which comprise a family of four protease inhibitors: TIMP-1, TIMP-2, TIMP-3, and TIMP-4.

TIMPs are small proteins made of two parts that has N-terminal domain (this is the main inhibitory part) and a C-terminal domain. Besides stopping MMPs, TIMPs can also do other jobs, like binding directly to receptors on the cell surface for signalling.

There are four main TIMPs:

- TIMP-1 is produced by almost every cell in the body. it has higher affinity towards MMP-9 and pro-MMP-9, but it does not inhibit some of the membrane-type MMPs (like MMP-14, MMP-16, MMP-18, MMP-19, MT1-MMP, MT2-MMP, MT3-MMP, and MT5-MMP).
- TIMP-2 is always present in most tissues; cells produce it all the time and growth factors don’t change its levels much.
- TIMP-3 stays in the extracellular matrix and is found especially in the basal membranes of the eyes and kidneys.
- TIMP-4 is mostly made in the heart, ovaries, kidneys, pancreas, colon, testes, brain, and fat tissue.

Synthetic inhibitors generally contain a chelating group that binds the catalytic zinc atom at the MMP active site tightly. Common chelating groups include hydroxamates, carboxylates, thiols, and phosphinyls. Hydroxymates are particularly potent inhibitors of MMPs and other zinc-dependent enzymes, due to their bidentate chelation of the zinc atom. Other substituents of these inhibitors are usually designed to interact with various binding pockets on the MMP of interest, making the inhibitor more or less specific for given MMPs.

=== MMPs regulation ===
Under physiological conditions, MMPs are regulated at five levels: transcription; activation of zymogen precursors; interaction with ECM components; inhibition by TIMPs; and regulated absorption/elimination of active proteases from the extracellular environment. The majority of the literature is based on an investigation of transcriptional level (level 1) modifications, which lacks information on the physiologically relevant actions and control of secreted and post-translationally activated proteases. Future study could focus on the post-transcriptional regulation of MMP activity, especially in vivo.

=== Pharmacology ===
Doxycycline, at subantimicrobial doses, inhibits MMP activity, and has been used in various experimental systems for this purpose, such as for recalcitrant recurrent corneal erosions. It is used clinically for the treatment of periodontal disease and is the only MMP inhibitor that is widely available clinically. It is sold under the trade name Periostat by the company CollaGenex. Minocycline, another tetracycline antibiotic, has also been shown to inhibit MMP activity.

A number of rationally designed MMP inhibitors have shown some promise in the treatment of pathologies that MMPs are suspected to be involved in (see above). However, most of these, such as marimastat (BB-2516), a broad-spectrum MMP inhibitor, and cipemastat (Ro 32-3555), an MMP-1 selective inhibitor, have performed poorly in clinical trials. The failure of Marimastat was partially responsible for the folding of British Biotech, which developed it. The failure of these drugs has been due largely to toxicity (in particular, musculo-skeletal toxicity in the case of broad spectrum inhibitors) and failure to show expected results (in the case of trocade, promising results in rabbit arthritis models were not replicated in human trials). The reasons behind the largely disappointing clinical results of MMP inhibitors is unclear, especially in light of their activity in animal models.

== See also ==
- Collagen hybridizing peptide, a peptide that can bind and stain MMP cleaved collagen
- Drug discovery and development of MMP inhibitors
- Proteases in angiogenesis
