= MMP26 =

Protein-coding gene in the species Homo sapiens

Identifiers
- Aliases: MMP26, matrix metallopeptidase 26
- External IDs: OMIM: 605470; HomoloGene: 49684; GeneCards: MMP26; OMA:MMP26 - orthologs

Gene location (Human)
Chr.	Chromosome 11 (human)
Band	11p15.4	Start	4,704,784 bp
Band	11p15.4	End	4,992,431 bp
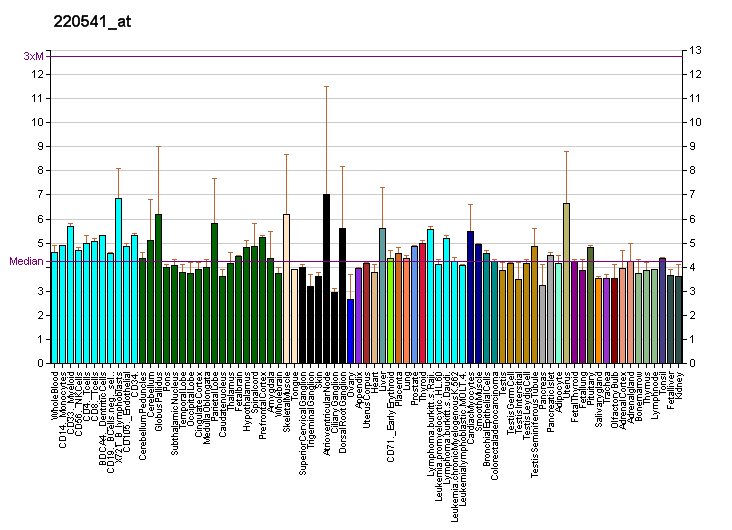
RNA expression pattern
Bgee	Human / Mouse (ortholog); Top expressed in: buccal mucosa cell; testicle; endometrium; gonad; prostate; renal cortex; myometrium; hepatobiliary system; skeletal muscle; smooth muscle tissue / n/a; More reference expression data
BioGPS	More reference expression data
Gene ontology
Molecular function	zinc ion binding; peptidase activity; metalloendopeptidase activity; hydrolase activity; metallopeptidase activity; metal ion binding
Cellular component	extracellular region; extracellular matrix; extracellular space
Biological process	collagen catabolic process; negative regulation of inflammatory response; proteolysis; extracellular matrix organization
Sources:Amigo / QuickGO
Orthologs
Species	Human	Mouse
Entrez	56547	n/a
Ensembl	ENSG00000167346	n/a
UniProt	Q9NRE1	n/a
RefSeq (mRNA)	NM_021801; NM_001384608	n/a
RefSeq (protein)	NP_068573	n/a
Location (UCSC)	Chr 11: 4.7 – 4.99 Mb	n/a
PubMed search		n/a
- Wikidata
View/Edit Human

Matrix metalloproteinase-26 also known as matrilysin-2 and endometase is an enzyme that in humans is encoded by the MMP26 gene.

== Function ==
Proteins of the matrix metalloproteinase (MMP) family are involved in the breakdown of extracellular matrix in normal physiological processes, such as embryonic development, reproduction, and tissue remodeling, as well as in disease processes, such as arthritis and metastasis. Most MMP's are secreted as inactive proproteins which are activated when cleaved by extracellular proteinases. The encoded protein degrades type IV collagen, fibronectin, fibrinogen, casein, vitronectin, alpha 1-antitrypsin (A1AT), alpha 2-macroglobulin (A2M), and insulin-like growth factor-binding protein 1 (IGFBP), and activates MMP9 by cleavage. The protein differs from most MMP family members in that it lacks a conserved C-terminal protein domain.
