= MMP3 =

Human enzyme

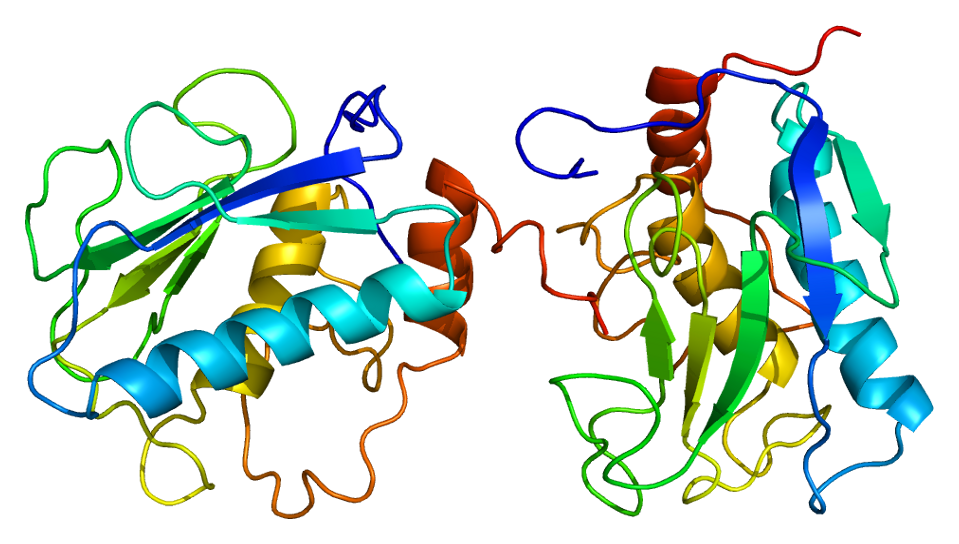

Identifiers
- Aliases: MMP3, CHDS6, MMP-3, SL-1, STMY, STMY1, STR1, matrix metallopeptidase 3
- External IDs: OMIM: 185250; MGI: 97010; GeneCards: MMP3
Available structures
| PDB | Ortholog search: PDBe RCSB |
| PDB | List of PDB id codes 1B3D, 1B8Y, 1BIW, 1BM6, 1BQO, 1C3I, 1C8T, 1CAQ, 1CIZ, 1CQR, 1D5J, 1D7X, 1D8F, 1D8M, 1G05, 1G49, 1G4K, 1HFS, 1HY7, 1OO9, 1QIA, 1QIC, 1SLM, 1SLN, 1UEA, 1UMS, 1UMT, 1USN, 2D1O, 2JNP, 2JT5, 2JT6, 2SRT, 2USN, 3OHL, 3OHO, 3USN, 4DPE, 4G9L, 4JA1 |
Enzyme activity
| EC # | BRENDA | ExPASy | KEGG | MetaCyc |
|---|---|---|---|---|
| 3.4.24.17 | ↗ | ↗ | ↗ | ↗ |

Gene location (Human)
| Chr. | Chromosome 11 (human) |
| Band | 11q22.2 | Start | 102,835,801 bp |
| Band | 11q22.2 | End | 102,843,609 bp |

Gene location (Mouse)
| Chr. | Chromosome 9 (mouse) |
| Band | 9 A1|9 2.46 cM | Start | 7,445,822 bp |
| Band | 9 A1|9 2.46 cM | End | 7,455,975 bp |
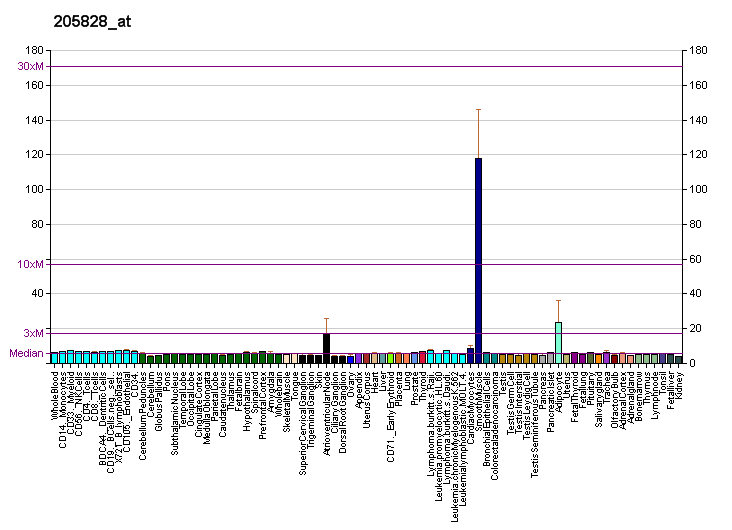
RNA expression pattern
| Bgee | Human / Mouse (ortholog); Top expressed in: Achilles tendon; cartilage tissue; pericardium; tendon of biceps brachii; synovial joint; synovial membrane of articular capsule of synovial joint; minor salivary glands; islet of Langerhans; stromal cell of endometrium; testicle / Top expressed in: lactiferous gland; ankle joint; conjunctival fornix; skin of external ear; tunica adventitia of aorta; subcutaneous adipose tissue; tunica media of zone of aorta; endothelial cell of lymphatic vessel; right lung lobe; carotid body; More reference expression data |
| BioGPS | More reference expression data |
Gene ontology
| Molecular function | zinc ion binding; peptidase activity; endopeptidase activity; metalloendopeptidase activity; protein binding; hydrolase activity; metal ion binding; serine-type endopeptidase activity; metallopeptidase activity |
| Cellular component | extracellular matrix; extracellular region; extracellular space |
| Biological process | collagen catabolic process; cellular response to nitric oxide; negative regulation of hydrogen peroxide metabolic process; extracellular matrix disassembly; proteolysis; positive regulation of protein oligomerization; positive regulation of oxidative stress-induced cell death; cytokine-mediated signaling pathway; response to hypoxia; regulation of cell migration; regulation of neuroinflammatory response; extracellular matrix organization; response to amyloid-beta |
Sources:Amigo / QuickGO
Orthologs
| Databases | NCBI: entry; OMA: entry |
| Species | Human | Mouse |
| Entrez | 4314 | 17392 |
| Ensembl | ENSG00000149968 | ENSMUSG00000043613 |
| UniProt | P08254 | P28862 |
| RefSeq (mRNA) | NM_002422 | NM_010809 |
| RefSeq (protein) | NP_002413 | NP_034939 |
| Location (UCSC) | Chr 11: 102.84 – 102.84 Mb | Chr 9: 7.45 – 7.46 Mb |
| PubMed search |
- Wikidata
| View/Edit Human | View/Edit Mouse |

Stromelysin 1

Identifiers
- EC no.: 3.4.24.17
- CAS no.: 79955-99-0

Databases
- BRENDA: enzyme data
- ExPASy: NiceZyme view
- KEGG: enzyme entry
- MetaCyc: metabolic pathway
- Rhea: reactions
- PDB structures: RCSB PDB PDBe PDBsum
Search
- PMC: articles
- PubMed: articles
- NCBI: proteins

Stromelysin-1 also known as matrix metalloproteinase-3 (MMP-3) is an enzyme that in humans is encoded by the MMP3 gene. The MMP3 gene is part of a cluster of MMP genes which localize to chromosome 11q22.3. MMP-3 has an estimated molecular weight of 54 kDa.

== Function ==
Proteins of the matrix metalloproteinase (MMP) family are involved in the breakdown of extracellular matrix proteins and during tissue remodeling in normal physiological processes, such as embryonic development and reproduction, as well as in disease processes, such as arthritis, and tumour metastasis. Most MMPs are secreted as inactive proproteins which are activated when cleaved by extracellular proteinases.

The MMP-3 enzyme degrades collagen types II, III, IV, IX, and X, proteoglycans, fibronectin, laminin, and elastin. In addition, MMP-3 can also activate other MMPs such as MMP-1, MMP-7, and MMP-9, rendering MMP-3 crucial in connective tissue remodeling. The enzyme is also thought to be involved in wound repair, progression of atherosclerosis, and tumor initiation.

In addition to classical roles for MMP3 in extracellular space, MMP3 can enter in cellular nuclei and control transcription.

== Gene regulation ==
MMP3 itself can enter in nuclei of cells and regulate target gene such as CTGF/CCN2 gene.

Expression of MMP3 is primarily regulated at the level of transcription, where the promoter of the gene responds to various stimuli, including growth factors, cytokines, tumor promoters, and oncogene products. A polymorphism in the promoter of the MMP3 gene was first reported in 1995. The polymorphism is caused by a variation in the number of adenosines located at position -1171 relative to the transcription start site, resulting in one allele having five adenosines (5A) and the other allele having six adenosines (6A). In vitro promoter functional analyses showed that the 5A allele had greater promoter activities as compared with the 6A allele. It has been shown in different studies that individuals carrying the 5A allele have increased susceptibility to diseases attributed to increased MMP expression, such as acute myocardial infarction and abdominal aortic aneurysm.

On the other hand, the 6A allele has been found to be associated with diseases characterized by insufficient MMP-3 expression due to a lower promoter activity of the 6A allele, such as progressive coronary atherosclerosis. The -1171 5A/6A variant has also been associated with congenital anomalies such as cleft lip and palate, where individuals with cleft lip/palate presented significantly more 6A/6A genotypes than controls. Recently, the MMP3 gene was shown to be down-regulated in individuals with cleft lip and palate when compared to controls, reinforcing the nature of cleft lip/palate as a condition resulting from insufficient or defective embryonic tissue remodeling.

== Structure ==
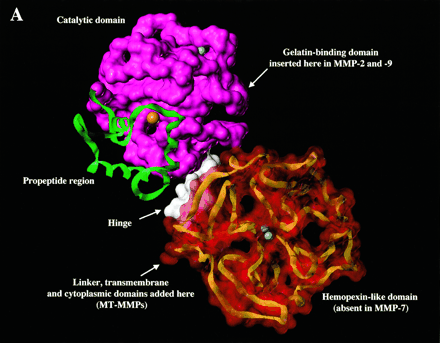
General structure for matrix metalloproteinases.

Most members of the MMP family are organized into three basic, distinctive, and well-conserved domains based on structural considerations: an amino-terminal propeptide; a catalytic domain; and a hemopexin-like domain at the carboxy-terminal. The propeptide consists of approximately 80–90 amino acids containing a cysteine residue, which interacts with the catalytic zinc atom via its side chain thiol group. A highly conserved sequence (. . .PRCGXPD. . .) is present in the propeptide. Removal of the propeptide by proteolysis results in zymogen activation, as all members of the MMP family are produced in a latent form.

The catalytic domain contains two zinc ions and at least one calcium ion coordinated to various residues. One of the two zinc ions is present in the active site and is involved in the catalytic processes of the MMPs. The second zinc ion (also known as structural zinc) and the calcium ion are present in the catalytic domain approximately 12 Å away from the catalytic zinc. The catalytic zinc ion is essential for the proteolytic activity of MMPs; the three histidine residues that coordinate with the catalytic zinc are conserved among all the MMPs. Little is known about the roles of the second zinc ion and the calcium ion within the catalytic domain, but the MMPs are shown to possess high affinities for structural zinc and calcium ions.

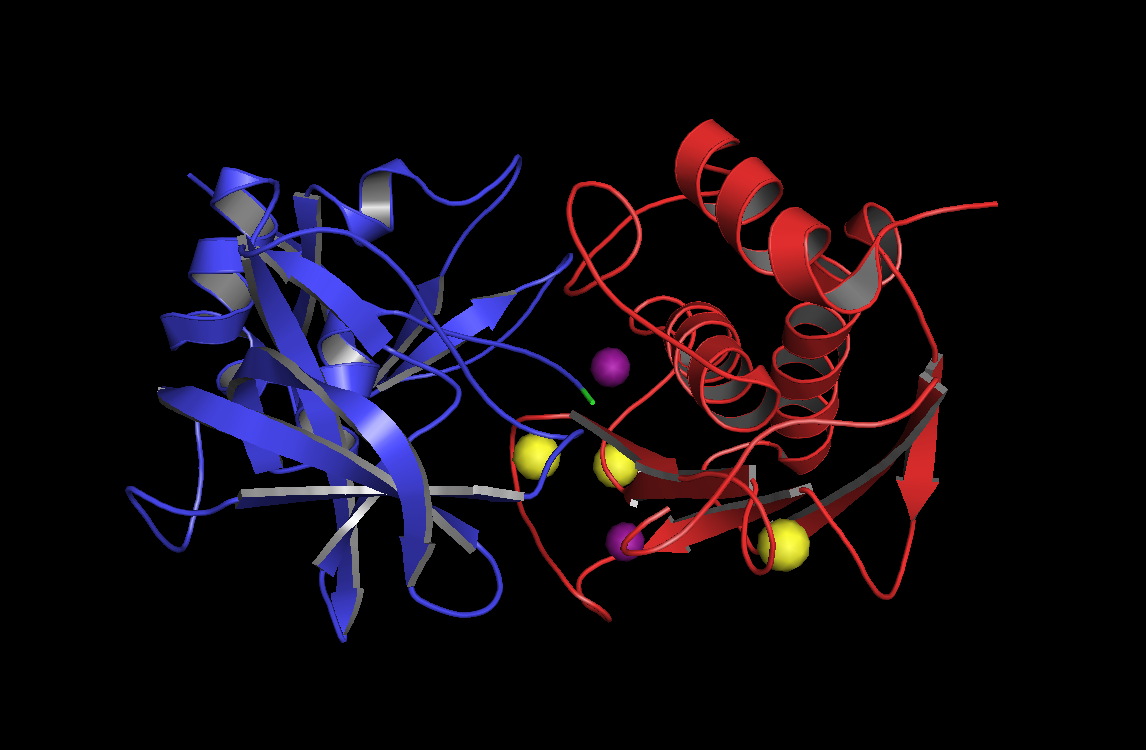
TIMP-1 (blue) in complex with MMP-3 (red). Note the Cys1 (green) TIMP-1 chelating to the catalytic zinc (purple). Calcium ions (yellow) are also shown. Based on the PyMOL rendering of PDB 1UEA. For simplicity, the other MMP-3 monomer complexed with its respective TIMP-1 is not shown.

The catalytic domain of MMP-3 can be inhibited by tissue inhibitors of metalloproteinases (TIMPs). The n-terminal fragment of the TIMP binds in the active site cleft much like the peptide substrate would bind. The Cys1 residue of the TIMP chelates to the catalytic zinc and forms hydrogen bonds with one of the carboxylate oxygens of the catalytic glutamate residue (Glu202, see mechanism below). These interactions force the zinc-bound water molecule that is essential to the enzyme's function to leave the enzyme. The loss of the water molecule and the blocking of the active site by TIMP disable the enzyme.

The hemopexin-like domain of MMPs is highly conserved and shows sequence similarity to the plasma protein, hemopexin. The hemopexin-like domain has been shown to play a functional role in substrate binding and/or in interactions with the tissue inhibitors of metalloproteinases (TIMPs), a family of specific MMP protein inhibitors.

== Mechanism ==
The mechanism for MMP-3 is a variation on a larger theme seen in all matrix metalloproteinases. In the active site, a water molecule is coordinated to a glutamate residue (Glu202) and one of the zinc ions present in the catalytic domain. First, the coordinated water molecule performs a nucleophilic attack on the peptide substrate's scissile carbon while the glutamate simultaneously abstracts a proton from the water molecule. The abstracted proton is then removed from the glutamate by the nitrogen of the scissile amide. This forms a tetrahedral gem-diolate intermediate that is coordinated to the zinc atom. In order for the amide product to be released from the active site, the scissile amide must abstract a second proton from the coordinated water molecule. Alternatively, it has been shown for thermolysin (another metalloproteinase) that the amide product can be released in its neutral (R-NH_{2}) form. The carboxylate product is released after a water molecule attacks the zinc ion and displaces the carboxylate product. The release of the carboxylate product is thought to be the rate-limiting step in the reaction.

In addition to the water molecule directly involved in the mechanism, a second water molecule is suggested to be a part of the MMP-3 active site. This auxiliary water molecule is thought to stabilize the gem-diolate intermediate as well as the transition states by lowering the activation energy for their formation. This is demonstrated in the mechanism and reaction coordinate diagram below.

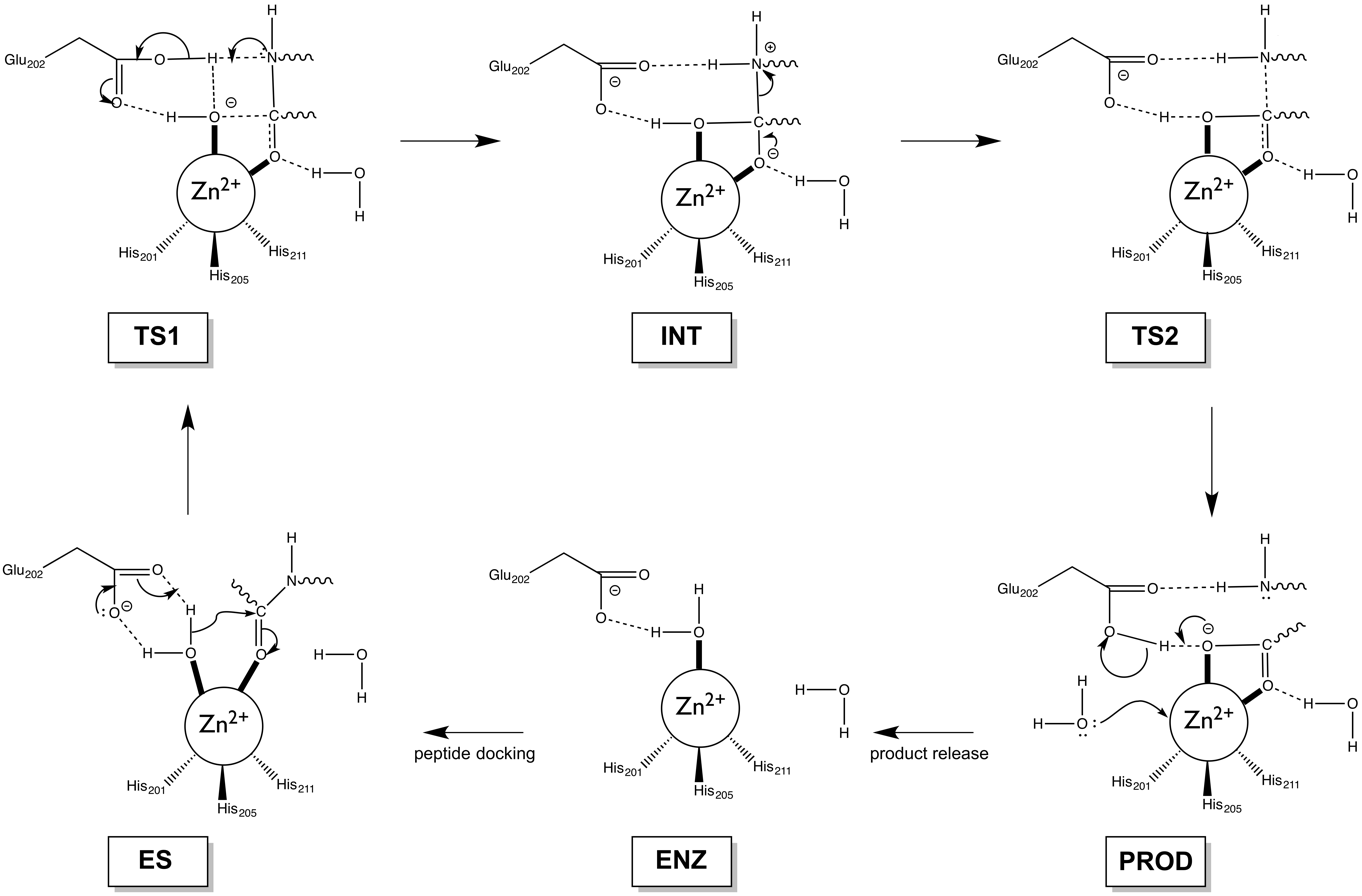
The catalytic mechanism for MMP-3 with an auxiliary water molecule. Charges shown are formal charges.

== Disease relevance ==
MMP-3 has been implicated in exacerbating the effects of traumatic brain injury (TBI) through its disruption of the blood-brain barrier (BBB). Different studies have shown that after the brain undergoes trauma and inflammation has begun, MMP production in the brain is increased. In a study conducted using MMP-3 wild type (WT) and knockout (KO) mice, MMP-3 was shown to increase BBB permeability after traumatic injury. The WT mice were shown to have lower claudin-5 and occludin levels than the KO mice after TBI. Claudin and occludin are proteins that are essential for the formation of the tight junctions between the cells of the blood-brain barrier. Tissue from uninjured WT and KO mice brains was also treated with active MMP-3. Both the WT and KO tissues showed a drop in claudin-5, occludin, and laminin-α1 (a basal lamina protein), suggesting that MMP-3 directly destroys tight junction and basal lamina proteins.

MMP-3 also does damage to the blood-spinal cord barrier (BSCB), the functional equivalent of the blood-brain barrier, after spinal cord injury (SCI). In a similar study conducted using MMP-3 WT and KO mice, MMP-3 was shown to increase BSCB permeability, with the WT mice showing greater BSCB permeability than the KO mice after spinal cord injury. The same study also found decreased BSCB permeability when spinal cord tissues were treated with a MMP-3 inhibitor. These results suggest that the presence of MMP-3 serves to increase BSCB permeability after SCI. The study showed that MMP-3 accomplishes this damage by degrading claudin-5, occludin, and ZO-1 (another tight junction protein), similar to how MMP-3 damages the BBB.

The increase in blood-brain barrier and blood-spinal cord barrier permeability allows for more neutrophils to infiltrate the brain and spinal cord at the site of inflammation. Neutrophils carry MMP-9., which has also been shown to degrade occludin. This leads to further disruption of the BBB and BSCB
