= Plant matrix metalloproteinase =

Class of enzymes found in plants

Plant matrix metalloproteinases are metalloproteins and zinc enzymes found in plants.

== Matrix Metalloproteinase ==
Matrix metalloproteinases (MMPs) are zinc endopeptidases, commonly called metzincins. MMP enzymes represent an ancient family of proteins with major similarities in genetic make-up that are present in a range of diverse organisms from unicellular bacteria to multicellular vertebrates and invertebrates. The superfamily is distinguished due to its motif consisting of three histidines bonded to zinc at the catalytic site. The metzincins are divided into four smaller families: seralysins, astacins, adamalysins (ADAMs), and MMPs. The MMP family is formed by twenty related zinc-dependent enzymes. They are noted for having the ability to degrade extracellular matrix proteins, such as collagens, laminin, and proteoglycans. These calcium- and zinc-dependent proteases are activated at neutral pH and twenty-three have been found present in mammalian cells. Plant MMPs show structural similarity to MMPs found in mammals, such as the presence of an auto-regulatory cysteine switch domain and a zinc-binding catalytic domain.

MMPs are synthesized primarily by connective tissues and have a large contribution to the initial events of tissue degradation. There are three major groups of the MMP family and each group has more than one distinct gene product that distinguishes them apart from one another on the immunological and biochemical criteria. Similar to that of induced fit by enzyme-substrate interactions, MMPs in the first group, called collagenases, have interstitial collagens. The second group, called gelatinases, degrade denatured collagens catalytically. The third group, called stromelysins, have the broadest proteolytic action and were originally confused as proteoglyconases. A less clearly described group of MMPs is the PUMP. Its RNA was taken from stromal cells in human breast carcinomas. Based on the PUMP sequence and functionality of carcinomas in the progression of malignancy, a new branch of the MMP family could have been discovered.

=== Extracellular Matrix ===
The most basic description of the plant extracellular matrix (ECM) is the cell wall, but it is actually the cell surface continuum that includes a variety of proteins with major roles in plant growth, development, and response. The ECM is composed of the primary and secondary cell walls, along with the intercellular gap between its neighboring cells. The ECM has a functional structure, along with aid in the regulation of turgor, which acts as a protective barrier and communicates with other cells using signaling pathways. In mammalian animals, extracellular matrix metalloproteinases (MMPs) modify the ECM to play significant roles in biological processes. The important role of MMP function in the extracellular matrix modification and subsequent mammalian development and signaling suggests that further study on the structure and function of these extracellular metalloproteinases may reveal new aspects of ECM modification in plant development.

=== Plant MMPs ===
All known MMPs have been studied in vertebrates; it is hypothesized that they are involved in remodeling connective tissue during development and healing. Current advances are being made in the field of Biochemistry, which will further analyze MMP-ECM interaction and their effects during plant development, stress induction, and xylem-phloem differences. SMEP1, soybean metalloendoproteinase 1, has been sequenced and characterized. It is noted that several unique divergences are in SMEP1 from that of the normal MMP family. For example, SMEP1 is said to have a free cysteine at position 94, a non-homologous insert from V103 to S121, a free sulfhydryl group, and the complete lack of the aspartate that is found in all of the other MMPs.

=== Studies of plant MMPs ===
Protein inhibitors of proteases, are present in plants, animals, and microorganisms. They are ubiquitous in nature and have a small molecular mass ranging from four to twenty-five kilo-Daltons. Different types of protease inhibition are directed toward a single class of protease. There are few reports on natural inhibitors of metalloproteinases. The metalloproteinase inhibitors (MPIs) can prevent unwanted proteolysis by denaturing their target proteases through non-competitive inhibition at an allosteric site. Five novel Lupinus albus MPIs were found and constitute the first reported protein inhibitors of metalloproteinases in plants and the first reported plant peptide inhibitors against a matrixin proteinase.

MtMMPL1, a Medicago truncatula nodulin gene identified by transcriptomics, is said to represent a novel and specific marker for root and nodule infection by Sinorhizobium meliloti. The possible role in the nitrogen-fixing symbiosis of a nodulin gene was investigated. The immune response of the plant to the alterations in the exopolysaccharides (EPSs) and lipopolysaccharides (LPSs) of various rhizobia led to the formation of enlarged infection threads (ITs) with thickened cell walls, which is often associated with plant defense reactions, and to the production of ineffective nodules in their plant host. Even though its precise role is classified as unknown, MTMMPL1 is noted as the first member of this biologically important protein family with a clear function in plant-microbe symbiotic associations.

At2-MMP from arabidopsis was found in leaves and roots of young arabidopsis and leaves, roots, and inflorescences of mature flowering plants showing strong increase of transcript abundance with aging. In the leaves, the MMP gene was expressed in the phloem, developing xylem elements, neighboring mesophyll cell layers, and epidermal cells. The flowers were noted as having the gene in pistils, ovules, and receptacles. It was concluded that the At2-MMP has a physiological role in mature aging tissue and the possibility of being involved in plant senescence.

The fungus Chondrostereum purpureum, the causal agent of silver leaf, was grown in liquid culture and agar, which caused it to secrete extracellular proteinases into the medium. The fluid dialysed by the activation of metal ions, which confirmed the presence of metalloproteinases. The silverleaf disease is a basidiomycete pathogenic on a wide range of host plants. The most notable host plant species include pomaceous and stone fruit species which are substantial for New Zealand’s economy. Cations, such as copper, zinc, and cobalt, are all inhibitory for the control of extract and stimulatory for EDTA-dialysed extract, which could possibly make the processes native cofactors. The amount of proteinases could be variable to the duration of the infection’s presence. Activity was found throughout the infected zone and not just the wound site; therefore, fungal growth and proteinase activity have a direct relationship. Even though zinc-binding metalloproteinases have been found to aid processes such as protein turnover and embryogenesis, it is still unclear as to the role they play in plants. To try to better understand MMPs’ role in plant tissue, the SMEP1 is cloned and analyzed using a polymerase chain reaction (PCR) and the rapid amplification of cDNA ends (RACE) reaction. It was found only to be present in mature leaves, which suggest that SEMP1 may play an important role in tissue modeling.
