= Vitronectin =

Protein

VTN
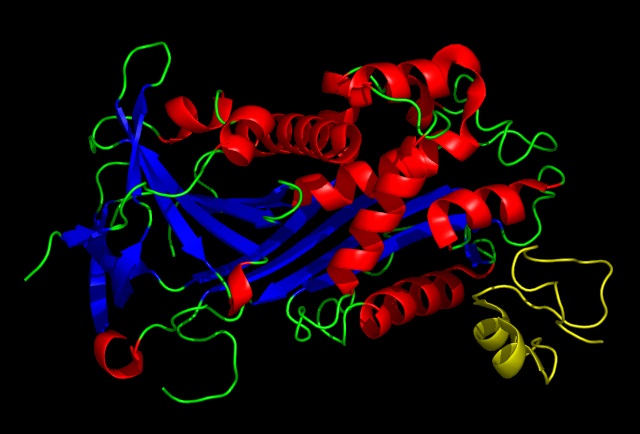

Identifiers
- Aliases: VTN, V75, VN, VNT, vitronectin
- External IDs: OMIM: 193190; MGI: 98940; GeneCards: VTN
Available structures
PDB	Ortholog search: PDBe RCSB
PDB	List of PDB id codes 1OC0, 1S4G, 1SSU, 2JQ8, 3BT1, 3BT2, 4K24

Gene location (Human)
Chr.	Chromosome 17 (human)
Band	17q11.2	Start	28,367,284 bp
Band	17q11.2	End	28,373,091 bp

Gene location (Mouse)
Chr.	Chromosome 11 (mouse)
Band	11 B5|11 46.74 cM	Start	78,389,917 bp
Band	11 B5|11 46.74 cM	End	78,393,150 bp
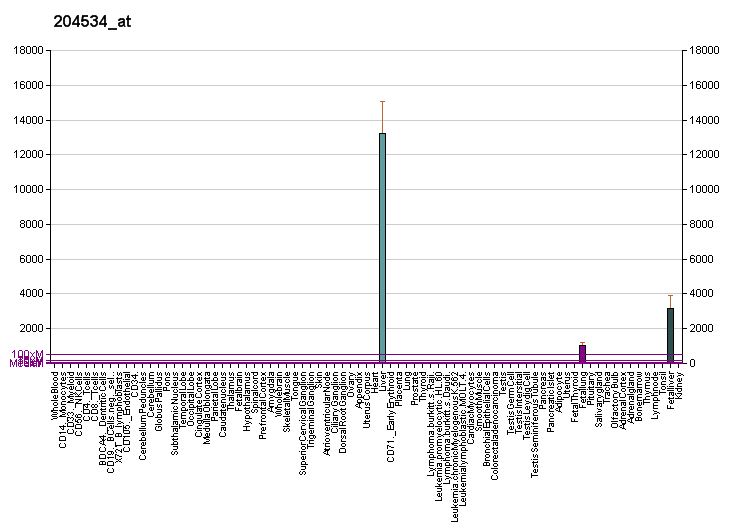
RNA expression pattern
Bgee	Human / Mouse (ortholog); Top expressed in: right lobe of liver; right adrenal gland; right adrenal cortex; left adrenal gland; left adrenal cortex; gallbladder; left ventricle; apex of heart; placenta; right hemisphere of cerebellum / Top expressed in: neural layer of retina; left lobe of liver; gallbladder; optic nerve; retinal pigment epithelium; dentate gyrus of hippocampal formation granule cell; epithelium of lens; sexually immature organism; fetal liver hematopoietic progenitor cell; pia mater; More reference expression data
BioGPS	More reference expression data
Gene ontology
Molecular function	protein binding; scavenger receptor activity; heparin binding; extracellular matrix binding; polysaccharide binding; integrin binding; identical protein binding; collagen binding; extracellular matrix structural constituent
Cellular component	alphav-beta3 integrin-vitronectin complex; extracellular exosome; blood microparticle; Golgi lumen; basement membrane; rough endoplasmic reticulum lumen; cytoplasm; extracellular matrix; extracellular space; endoplasmic reticulum; intracellular membrane-bounded organelle; extracellular region; collagen-containing extracellular matrix
Biological process	receptor-mediated endocytosis; positive regulation of protein binding; cell adhesion; positive regulation of cell-substrate adhesion; extracellular matrix organization; smooth muscle cell-matrix adhesion; regulation of complement activation; positive regulation of smooth muscle cell migration; negative regulation of endopeptidase activity; positive regulation of peptidyl-tyrosine phosphorylation; positive regulation of vascular endothelial growth factor receptor signaling pathway; immune response; endodermal cell differentiation; positive regulation of wound healing; positive regulation of receptor-mediated endocytosis; negative regulation of blood coagulation; oligodendrocyte differentiation; cell adhesion mediated by integrin; cell-matrix adhesion; protein polymerization; liver regeneration; cell population proliferation; cell migration; vesicle-mediated transport; endocytosis
Sources:Amigo / QuickGO
Orthologs
Databases	NCBI: entry; OMA: entry
Species	Human	Mouse
Entrez	7448	22370
Ensembl	ENSG00000109072	ENSMUSG00000017344
UniProt	P04004	P29788
RefSeq (mRNA)	NM_000638	NM_011707
RefSeq (protein)	NP_000629	NP_035837
Location (UCSC)	Chr 17: 28.37 – 28.37 Mb	Chr 11: 78.39 – 78.39 Mb
PubMed search
- Wikidata
View/Edit Human	View/Edit Mouse

Vitronectin (VTN or VN) is a glycoprotein of the hemopexin family which is synthesized and excreted by the liver, and abundantly found in serum, the extracellular matrix and bone. In humans it is encoded by the VTN gene.

Vitronectin binds to integrin alpha-V beta-3 and thus promotes cell adhesion and spreading. It also inhibits the membrane-damaging effect of the terminal cytolytic complement pathway and binds to several serpins (serine protease inhibitors). It is a secreted protein and exists in either a single chain form or a clipped, two chain form held together by a disulfide bond. Vitronectin has been speculated to be involved in hemostasis and tumor malignancy.

== Structure ==
Vitronectin is a 75 kDa glycoprotein, consisting of 478 amino acid residues. About one-third of the protein's molecular mass is composed of carbohydrates. On occasion, the protein is cleaved after arginine 379, to produce two-chain vitronectin, where the two parts are linked by a disulfide bond. No high-resolution structure has been determined experimentally yet, except for the N-terminal domain.

The protein consists of three domains:

- The N-terminal Somatomedin B domain (1-39)
- A central domains with hemopexin homology (131-342)
- A C-terminal domain (residues 347-459) also with hemopexin homology.

Several structures has been reported for the Somatomedin B domain. The protein was initially crystallized in complex with one of its physiological binding partners: the Plasminogen activator inhibitor-1 (PAI-1) and the structure solved for this complex. Subsequently two groups reported NMR structures of the domain.

The somatomedin B domain is a close-knit disulfide knot, with 4 disulfide bonds within 35 residues. Different disulfide configurations had been reported for this domain but this ambiguity has been resolved by the crystal structure.

Homology models have been built for the central and C-terminal domains.

== Function ==
The somatomedin B domain of vitronectin binds to plasminogen activator inhibitor-1 (PAI-1), and stabilizes it. Thus vitronectin serves to regulate proteolysis initiated by plasminogen activation. In addition, vitronectin is a component of platelets and is, thus, involved in hemostasis. Vitronectin contains an RGD (45-47) sequence, which is a binding site for membrane-bound integrins, e.g., the vitronectin receptor, which serve to anchor cells to the extracellular matrix. The Somatomedin B domain interacts with the urokinase receptor, and this interaction has been implicated in cell migration and signal transduction. High plasma levels of both PAI-1 and the urokinase receptor have been shown to correlate with a negative prognosis for cancer patients. Cell adhesion and migration are directly involved in cancer metastasis, which provides a probable mechanistic explanation for this observation.
