= MMP11 =

Protein-coding gene in humans

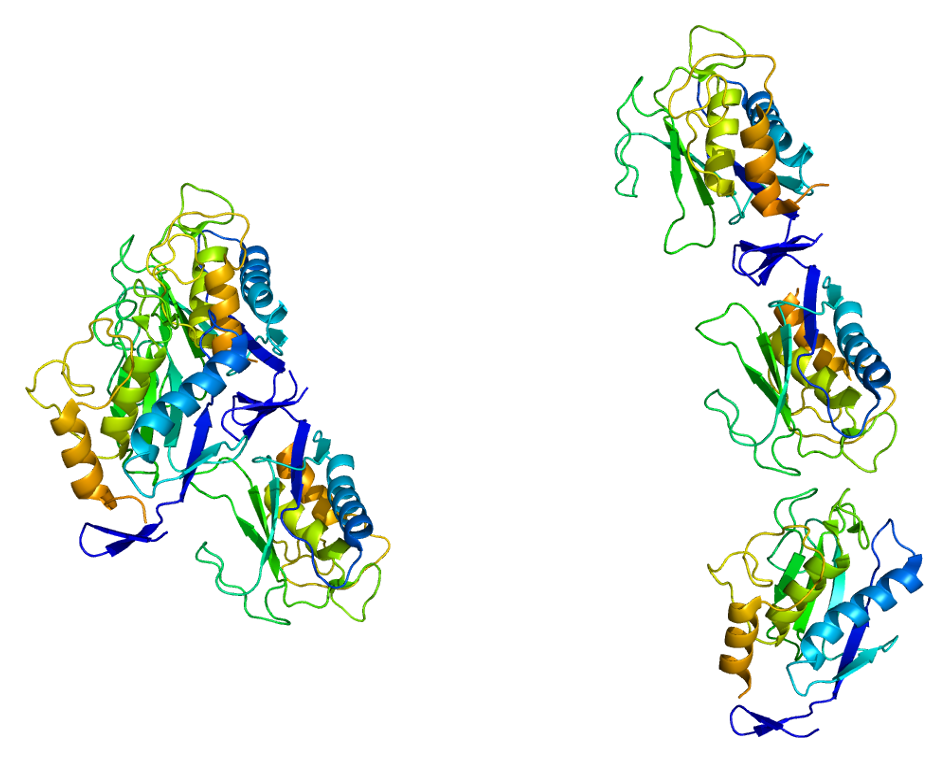
Available structures
PDB	Ortholog search: PDBe RCSB
PDB	List of PDB id codes 1HV5

Identifiers
- Aliases: MMP11, SL-3, ST3, STMY3, matrix metallopeptidase 11
- External IDs: OMIM: 185261; MGI: 97008; HomoloGene: 38116; GeneCards: MMP11; OMA:MMP11 - orthologs

Gene location (Mouse)
Chr.	Chromosome 10 (mouse)
Band	10 C1|10 38.62 cM	Start	75,759,056 bp
Band	10 C1|10 38.62 cM	End	75,772,330 bp
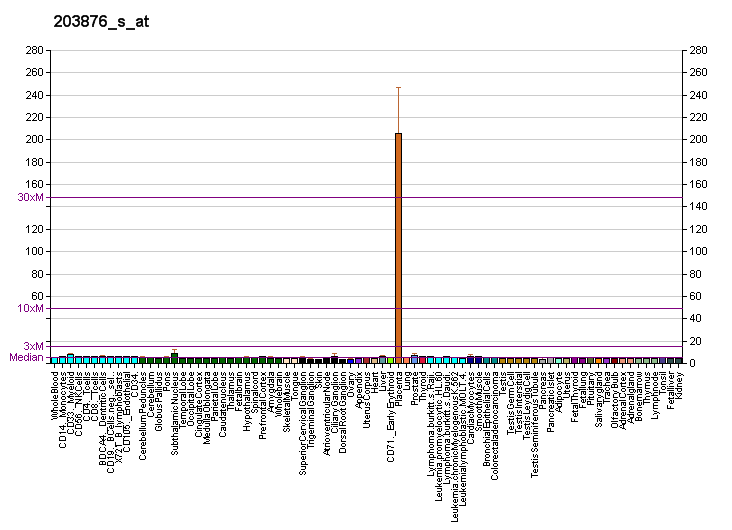

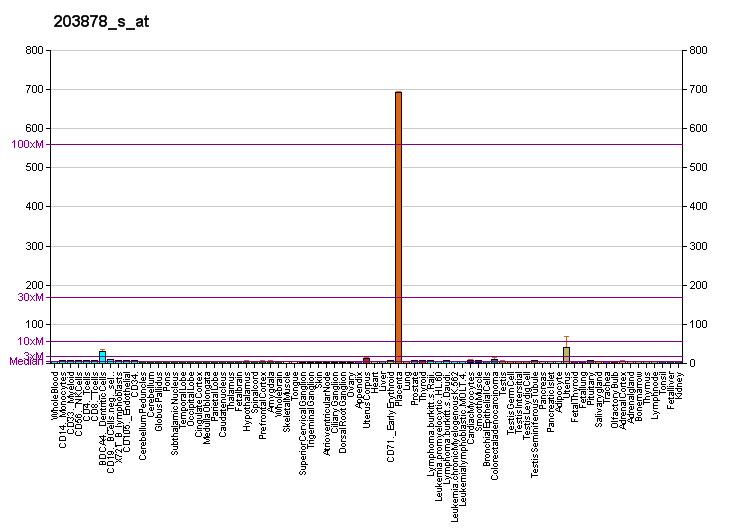
RNA expression pattern
Bgee	Human / Mouse (ortholog); Top expressed in: stromal cell of endometrium; canal of the cervix; right uterine tube; smooth muscle tissue; gallbladder; left ventricle; ganglionic eminence; right coronary artery; left uterine tube; rectum / Top expressed in: genital tubercle; Gonadal ridge; external carotid artery; cervix; ankle joint; internal carotid artery; ovary; vas deferens; tail of embryo; ascending aorta; More reference expression data
BioGPS	More reference expression data
Gene ontology
Molecular function	zinc ion binding; peptidase activity; metalloendopeptidase activity; hydrolase activity; metallopeptidase activity; metal ion binding; serine-type endopeptidase activity
Cellular component	Golgi lumen; extracellular region; extracellular matrix; extracellular space
Biological process	collagen catabolic process; multicellular organism development; negative regulation of fat cell differentiation; extracellular matrix disassembly; proteolysis; collagen fibril organization; basement membrane organization; extracellular matrix organization
Sources:Amigo / QuickGO
Orthologs
Species	Human	Mouse
Entrez	4320	17385
Ensembl	n/a	ENSMUSG00000000901
UniProt	P24347	Q02853
RefSeq (mRNA)	NM_005940	NM_008606; NM_001306184
RefSeq (protein)	NP_005931; NP_005931.2	NP_001293113; NP_032632
Location (UCSC)	n/a	Chr 10: 75.76 – 75.77 Mb
PubMed search
- Wikidata
View/Edit Human	View/Edit Mouse

Stromelysin-3 (SL-3) also known as matrix metalloproteinase-11 (MMP-11) is an enzyme that in humans is encoded by the MMP11 gene.

== Function ==
Proteins of the matrix metalloproteinase (MMP) family are involved in the breakdown of extracellular matrix in normal physiological processes, such as embryonic development, reproduction, and tissue remodeling, as well as in disease processes, such as arthritis and metastasis. Most MMPs are secreted as inactive proproteins which are activated when cleaved by extracellular proteinases. However, the enzyme encoded by this gene is activated intracellularly by furin within the constitutive secretory pathway. Also in contrast to other MMPs, this enzyme cleaves alpha 1-proteinase inhibitor but weakly degrades structural proteins of the extracellular matrix.
