= MMP23B =

Protein-coding gene in humans

Identifiers
- Aliases: MMP23B, MIFR, MIFR-1, MMP22, MMP23A, matrix metallopeptidase 23B
- External IDs: OMIM: 603321; MGI: 1347361; GeneCards: MMP23B

Gene location (Human)
Chr.	Chromosome 1 (human)
Band	1p36.33	Start	1,632,163 bp
Band	1p36.33	End	1,635,263 bp

Gene location (Mouse)
Chr.	Chromosome 4 (mouse)
Band	4|4 E2	Start	155,735,112 bp
Band	4|4 E2	End	155,737,841 bp
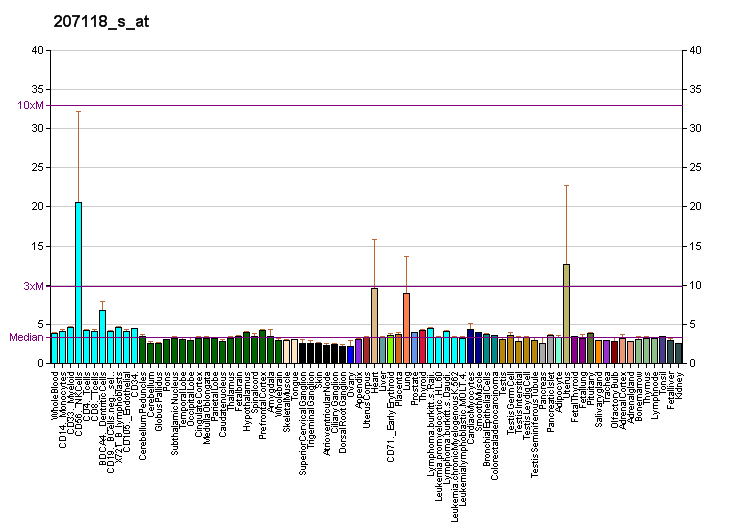
RNA expression pattern
Bgee	Human / Mouse (ortholog); Top expressed in: apex of heart; right ovary; left uterine tube; right coronary artery; left ovary; left ventricle; thoracic aorta; ascending aorta; Descending thoracic aorta; granulocyte / Top expressed in: ascending aorta; aortic valve; calvaria; uterus; stroma of bone marrow; tunica media of zone of aorta; body of femur; renal corpuscle; pericardial cavity; efferent ductule; More reference expression data
BioGPS	More reference expression data
Gene ontology
Molecular function	zinc ion binding; peptidase activity; metalloendopeptidase activity; hydrolase activity; metallopeptidase activity; metal ion binding
Cellular component	integral component of membrane; intracellular anatomical structure; endoplasmic reticulum membrane; endoplasmic reticulum; membrane; extracellular matrix; collagen-containing extracellular matrix; extracellular space
Biological process	reproduction; proteolysis; extracellular matrix organization; collagen catabolic process
Sources:Amigo / QuickGO
Orthologs
Databases	NCBI: entry; OMA: entry
Species	Human	Mouse
Entrez	8510	26561
Ensembl	ENSG00000189409	ENSMUSG00000029061
UniProt	O75900	O88676
RefSeq (mRNA)	NM_006983	NM_011985; NM_001320235
RefSeq (protein)	NP_008914	NP_001307164; NP_036115
Location (UCSC)	Chr 1: 1.63 – 1.64 Mb	Chr 4: 155.74 – 155.74 Mb
PubMed search
- Wikidata
View/Edit Human	View/Edit Mouse

Matrix metalloproteinase-23 is an enzyme that in humans is encoded by the MMP23B gene.

== Function ==
This gene (MMP23B) encodes a member of the matrix metalloproteinase (MMP) family, and it is part of a duplicated region of chromosome 1p36.3. Proteins of the matrix metalloproteinase (MMP) family are involved in the breakdown of extracellular matrix in normal physiological processes, such as embryonic development, reproduction, and tissue remodeling, as well as in disease processes, such as arthritis and metastasis. This gene belongs to the copy of the duplicated region of the gene that is closer to the end of the chromosome (more telomeric).

MMP23B is strongly expressed in ovary and heart.
