= Predictive mean matching =

Predictive mean matching (PMM) is a widely used statistical imputation method for missing values, first proposed by Donald B. Rubin in 1986 and R. J. A. Little in 1988.

It aims to reduce the bias introduced in a dataset through imputation, by drawing real values sampled from the data. This is achieved by building a small subset of observations where the outcome variable matches the outcome of the observations with missing values.

Compared to other imputation methods, it usually imputes less implausible values (e.g. negative incomes) and takes heteroscedastic data into account more appropriately.
