= MMP17 =

Protein-coding gene in the species Homo sapiens

Identifiers
- Aliases: MMP17, MT4-MMP, MMP-17, MT4MMP, MTMMP4, matrix metallopeptidase 17
- External IDs: OMIM: 602285; MGI: 1346076; HomoloGene: 22669; GeneCards: MMP17; OMA:MMP17 - orthologs

Gene location (Human)
| Chr. | Chromosome 12 (human) |
| Band | 12q24.33 | Start | 131,828,393 bp |
| Band | 12q24.33 | End | 131,851,783 bp |

Gene location (Mouse)
| Chr. | Chromosome 5 (mouse) |
| Band | 5 G1.3|5 68.18 cM | Start | 129,661,233 bp |
| Band | 5 G1.3|5 68.18 cM | End | 129,688,163 bp |
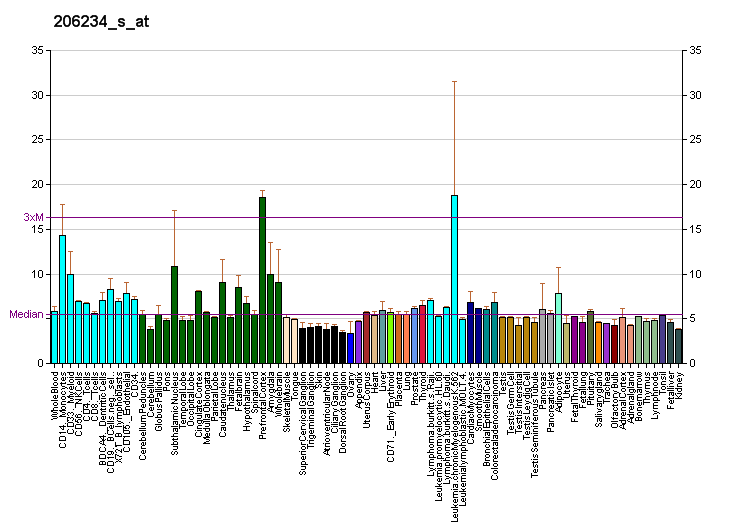
RNA expression pattern
| Bgee | Human / Mouse (ortholog); Top expressed in: right frontal lobe; anterior cingulate cortex; nucleus accumbens; prefrontal cortex; caudate nucleus; putamen; Brodmann area 9; amygdala; granulocyte; tibial nerve / Top expressed in: primary motor cortex; dentate gyrus; olfactory tubercle; prefrontal cortex; subiculum; ascending aorta; dentate gyrus of hippocampal formation granule cell; CA3 field; anterior amygdaloid area; hippocampus proper; More reference expression data |
| BioGPS | More reference expression data |
Gene ontology
| Molecular function | metallopeptidase activity; enzyme activator activity; metal ion binding; peptidase activity; hydrolase activity; zinc ion binding; metalloendopeptidase activity; metalloaminopeptidase activity |
| Cellular component | integral component of plasma membrane; membrane; extracellular region; extracellular matrix; anchored component of membrane; plasma membrane; extracellular space |
| Biological process | drinking behavior; positive regulation of catalytic activity; kidney development; proteolysis; extracellular matrix organization; collagen catabolic process |
Sources:Amigo / QuickGO
Orthologs
| Species | Human | Mouse |
| Entrez | 4326 | 23948 |
| Ensembl | ENSG00000198598 | ENSMUSG00000029436 |
| UniProt | Q9ULZ9; Q8IWC3 | Q9R0S3 |
| RefSeq (mRNA) | NM_016155 | NM_011846 |
| RefSeq (protein) | NP_057239; NP_057239.4 | NP_035976 |
| Location (UCSC) | Chr 12: 131.83 – 131.85 Mb | Chr 5: 129.66 – 129.69 Mb |
| PubMed search |
- Wikidata
| View/Edit Human | View/Edit Mouse |

Matrix metalloproteinase-17 (MMP-17) also known as membrane-type matrix metalloproteinase 4 (MT-MMP 4) is an enzyme that in humans is encoded by the MMP17 gene.

== Function ==
Proteins of the matrix metalloproteinase (MMP) family are involved in the breakdown of extracellular matrix in normal physiological processes, such as embryonic development, reproduction, and tissue remodeling, as well as in disease processes, such as arthritis and metastasis. Most MMP's are secreted as inactive proproteins which are activated when cleaved by extracellular proteinases. The protein encoded by this gene is considered a member of the membrane-type MMP (MT-MMP) subfamily. MMP17 and MMP25 are to this day the only known GPI-anchored membrane-type MMPs, opposite to the more common transmembrane MMPs. The protein activates MMP2 by cleavage.

In melanocytic cells MMP17 gene expression may be regulated by MITF.
