= MMP24 =

Protein-coding gene in the species Homo sapiens

Identifiers
- Aliases: MMP24, MMP-24, MMP25, MT-MMP 5, MT-MMP5, MT5-MMP, MT5MMP, MTMMP5, matrix metallopeptidase 24
- External IDs: OMIM: 604871; MGI: 1341867; HomoloGene: 21331; GeneCards: MMP24; OMA:MMP24 - orthologs

Gene location (Human)
Chr.	Chromosome 20 (human)
Band	20q11.22	Start	35,226,690 bp
Band	20q11.22	End	35,276,998 bp

Gene location (Mouse)
Chr.	Chromosome 2 (mouse)
Band	2 H1|2 77.26 cM	Start	155,617,262 bp
Band	2 H1|2 77.26 cM	End	155,660,286 bp
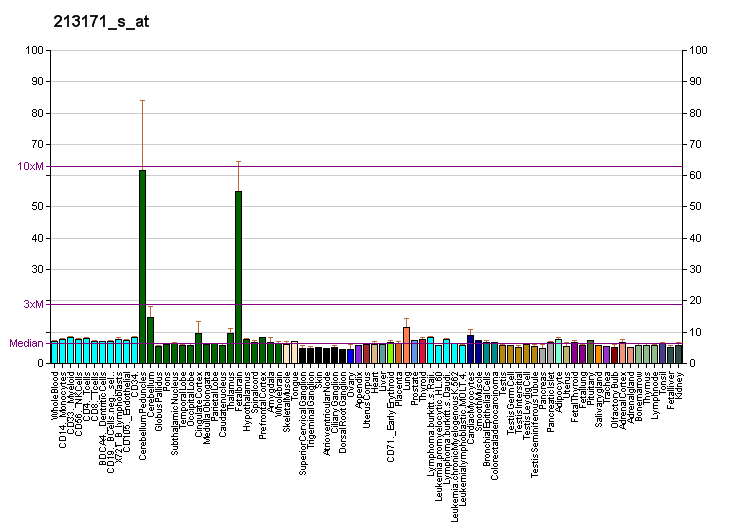

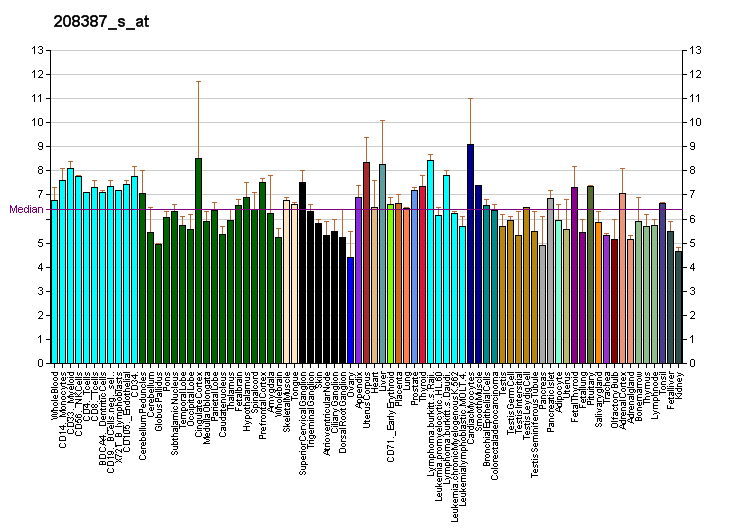
RNA expression pattern
Bgee	Human / Mouse (ortholog); Top expressed in: right hemisphere of cerebellum; tendon of biceps brachii; buccal mucosa cell; cerebellar vermis; internal globus pallidus; prefrontal cortex; right frontal lobe; pars reticulata; paraflocculus of cerebellum; ganglionic eminence / Top expressed in: cerebellar cortex; lobe of cerebellum; cerebellar vermis; gastrula; supraoptic nucleus; dentate gyrus of hippocampal formation granule cell; primary visual cortex; superior frontal gyrus; ganglionic eminence; ascending aorta; More reference expression data
BioGPS	More reference expression data
Gene ontology
Molecular function	zinc ion binding; cadherin binding; metal ion binding; peptidase activity; enzyme activator activity; metalloendopeptidase activity; hydrolase activity; metallopeptidase activity
Cellular component	integral component of membrane; Golgi apparatus; trans-Golgi network membrane; membrane; extracellular matrix; plasma membrane; integral component of plasma membrane; extracellular region; extracellular exosome; extracellular space
Biological process	glial cell differentiation; proteolysis; detection of temperature stimulus involved in sensory perception of pain; neuronal stem cell population maintenance; cell-cell adhesion mediated by cadherin; cell adhesion; positive regulation of catalytic activity; cell-cell adhesion via plasma-membrane adhesion molecules; extracellular matrix organization; collagen catabolic process
Sources:Amigo / QuickGO
Orthologs
Species	Human	Mouse
Entrez	10893	17391
Ensembl	ENSG00000125966	ENSMUSG00000027612
UniProt	Q9Y5R2	Q9R0S2
RefSeq (mRNA)	NM_006690	NM_010808
RefSeq (protein)	NP_006681	NP_034938
Location (UCSC)	Chr 20: 35.23 – 35.28 Mb	Chr 2: 155.62 – 155.66 Mb
PubMed search
- Wikidata
View/Edit Human	View/Edit Mouse

Matrix metalloproteinase-24 is an enzyme that in humans is encoded by the MMP24 gene.

Proteins of the matrix metalloproteinase (MMP) family are involved in the breakdown of extracellular matrix in normal physiological processes, such as embryonic development, reproduction, and tissue remodeling, as well as in disease processes, such as arthritis and metastasis. Most MMP's are secreted as inactive proproteins which are activated when cleaved by extracellular proteinases. However, the protein encoded by this gene is a member of the membrane-type MMP (MT-MMP) subfamily; each member of this subfamily contains a potential transmembrane domain suggesting that these proteins are expressed at the cell surface rather than secreted. This protein activates MMP2 by cleavage. The gene has previously been referred to as MMP25 but has been renamed MMP24.
