= MMP21 =

Protein-coding gene in the species Homo sapiens

Identifiers
- Aliases: MMP21, MMP-21, HTX7, matrix metallopeptidase 21
- External IDs: OMIM: 608416; MGI: 2664387; HomoloGene: 17519; GeneCards: MMP21; OMA:MMP21 - orthologs

Gene location (Human)
Chr.	Chromosome 10 (human)
Band	10q26.2	Start	125,753,580 bp
Band	10q26.2	End	125,775,821 bp

Gene location (Mouse)
Chr.	Chromosome 7 (mouse)
Band	7|7 F3	Start	133,275,999 bp
Band	7|7 F3	End	133,281,790 bp
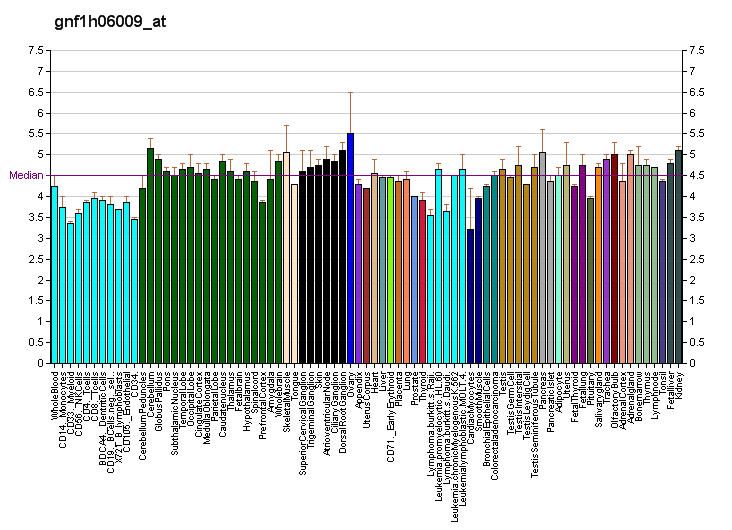
RNA expression pattern
Bgee	Human / Mouse (ortholog); Top expressed in: gonad; corpus epididymis; testicle; left ovary; right ovary; body of pancreas; minor salivary glands; ectocervix; right auricle of heart; right uterine tube / Top expressed in: embryo; blastocyst; right kidney; More reference expression data
BioGPS	More reference expression data
Gene ontology
Molecular function	metallopeptidase activity; metal ion binding; zinc ion binding; metalloendopeptidase activity; peptidase activity; hydrolase activity
Cellular component	extracellular region; extracellular matrix
Biological process	hematopoietic progenitor cell differentiation; proteolysis; coronary vasculature development; determination of left/right symmetry; determination of heart left/right asymmetry; extracellular matrix organization; collagen catabolic process
Sources:Amigo / QuickGO
Orthologs
Species	Human	Mouse
Entrez	118856	214766
Ensembl	ENSG00000154485	ENSMUSG00000030981
UniProt	Q8N119	Q8K3F2
RefSeq (mRNA)	NM_147191	NM_152944; NM_001320216
RefSeq (protein)	NP_671724	NP_001307145; NP_694423
Location (UCSC)	Chr 10: 125.75 – 125.78 Mb	Chr 7: 133.28 – 133.28 Mb
PubMed search
- Wikidata
View/Edit Human	View/Edit Mouse

Matrix metalloproteinase-21 (MMP-21) is an enzyme that in humans is encoded by the MMP21 gene.

== Function ==
This gene encodes a member of the matrix metalloproteinase family. Proteins in this family are involved in the breakdown of extracellular matrix for both normal physiological processes, such as embryonic development, reproduction, and tissue remodeling, and disease processes, such as asthma and metastasis. The encoded protein may play an important role in embryogenesis, particularly in neuronal cells, as well as in lymphocyte development and survival.
