= MMP19 =

Protein-coding gene in the species Homo sapiens

Identifiers
- Aliases: MMP19, MMP18, RASI-1, CODA, matrix metallopeptidase 19
- External IDs: OMIM: 601807; MGI: 1927899; HomoloGene: 1820; GeneCards: MMP19; OMA:MMP19 - orthologs

Gene location (Human)
| Chr. | Chromosome 12 (human) |
| Band | 12q13.2 | Start | 55,835,433 bp |
| Band | 12q13.2 | End | 55,842,966 bp |

Gene location (Mouse)
| Chr. | Chromosome 10 (mouse) |
| Band | 10 D3|10 77.16 cM | Start | 128,626,779 bp |
| Band | 10 D3|10 77.16 cM | End | 128,636,693 bp |
RNA expression pattern
| Bgee | Human / Mouse (ortholog); Top expressed in: left uterine tube; gallbladder; olfactory bulb; upper lobe of left lung; spleen; ascending aorta; stromal cell of endometrium; Descending thoracic aorta; smooth muscle tissue; right ovary / Top expressed in: liver; stroma of bone marrow; blood; left lobe of liver; adrenal gland; uterus; aortic valve; ascending aorta; muscle of thigh; umbilical cord; More reference expression data |
| BioGPS | n/a |
Gene ontology
| Molecular function | zinc ion binding; metal ion binding; peptidase activity; hydrolase activity; metallopeptidase activity; metalloendopeptidase activity; serine-type endopeptidase activity |
| Cellular component | extracellular region; extracellular matrix; extracellular space |
| Biological process | cell differentiation; ovulation from ovarian follicle; extracellular matrix disassembly; luteolysis; proteolysis; multicellular organism development; angiogenesis; ovarian follicle development; response to hormone; response to cAMP; collagen catabolic process; extracellular matrix organization |
Sources:Amigo / QuickGO
Orthologs
| Species | Human | Mouse |
| Entrez | 4327 | 58223 |
| Ensembl | ENSG00000123342 | ENSMUSG00000025355 |
| UniProt | Q99542 | Q9JHI0 |
| RefSeq (mRNA) | NM_001032360; NM_001272101; NM_002429; NM_022790; NM_022792 | NM_001164197; NM_021412 |
| RefSeq (protein) | NP_001259030; NP_002420 | NP_001157669; NP_067387 |
| Location (UCSC) | Chr 12: 55.84 – 55.84 Mb | Chr 10: 128.63 – 128.64 Mb |
| PubMed search |
- Wikidata
| View/Edit Human | View/Edit Mouse |

Matrix metalloproteinase-19 (MMP-19) also known as matrix metalloproteinase RASI is an enzyme that in humans is encoded by the MMP19 gene.

== Function ==
Proteins of the matrix metalloproteinase (MMP) family are involved in the breakdown of extracellular matrix in normal physiological processes, such as embryonic development, reproduction, and tissue remodeling, as well as in disease processes, such as arthritis and metastasis. Most MMP's are secreted as inactive proproteins which are activated when cleaved by extracellular proteinases. This protein is expressed in human epidermis and endothelial cells and it has a role in cellular proliferation, migration, angiogenesis and adhesion. Multiple transcript variants encoding distinct isoforms have been identified for this gene.
