= MMP7 =

Protein-coding gene in humans

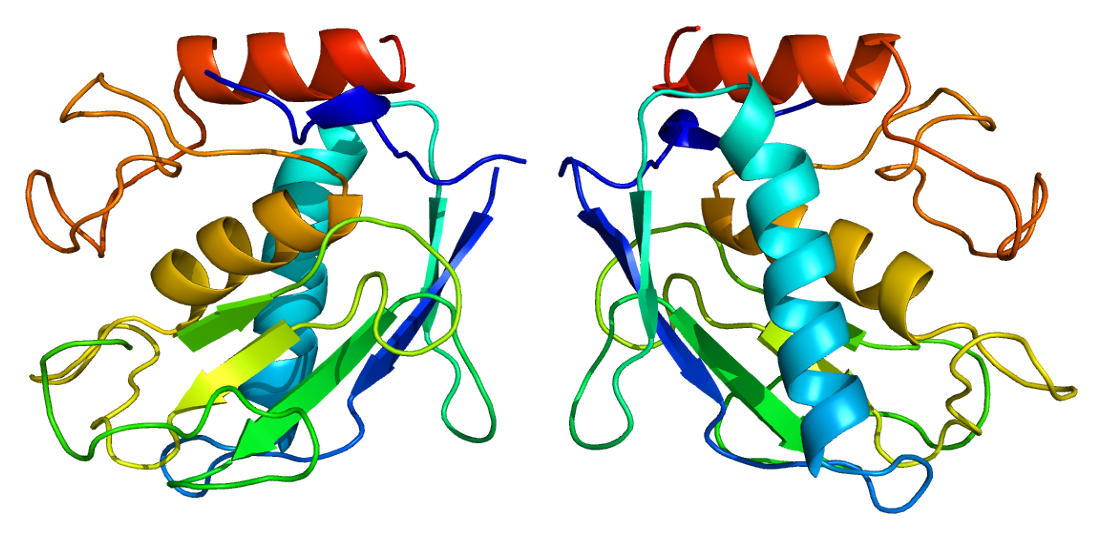

Identifiers
- Aliases: MMP7, MMP-7, MPSL1, PUMP-1, matrix metallopeptidase 7
- External IDs: OMIM: 178990; MGI: 103189; GeneCards: MMP7
Available structures
| PDB | Ortholog search: PDBe RCSB |
| PDB | List of PDB id codes 1MMQ, 1MMR, 2MZE, 2DDY, 2Y6C, 2MZH, 1MMP, 2Y6D |
Enzyme activity
| EC # | BRENDA | ExPASy | KEGG | MetaCyc |
|---|---|---|---|---|
| 3.4.24.23 | ↗ | ↗ | ↗ | ↗ |

Gene location (Human)
| Chr. | Chromosome 11 (human) |
| Band | 11q22.2 | Start | 102,520,508 bp |
| Band | 11q22.2 | End | 102,530,750 bp |

Gene location (Mouse)
| Chr. | Chromosome 9 (mouse) |
| Band | 9 A1|9 2.46 cM | Start | 7,692,091 bp |
| Band | 9 A1|9 2.46 cM | End | 7,699,586 bp |
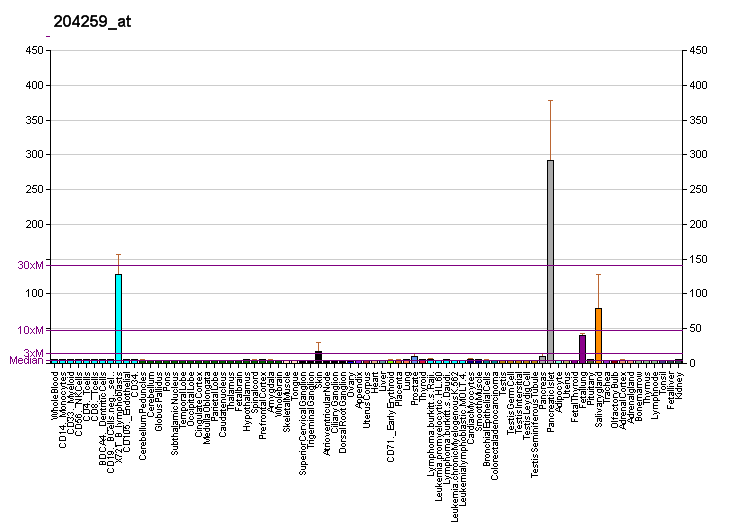
RNA expression pattern
| Bgee | Human / Mouse (ortholog); Top expressed in: gallbladder; islet of Langerhans; pancreatic ductal cell; beta cell; caput epididymis; body of pancreas; minor salivary glands; olfactory zone of nasal mucosa; Achilles tendon; epithelium of lactiferous gland / Top expressed in: crypt of lieberkuhn of small intestine; Paneth cell; duodenum; Ileal epithelium; jejunum; jejunal mucosa; tail of epididymis; gallbladder; mucous gland; Glandular part of endometrium; More reference expression data |
| BioGPS | More reference expression data |
Gene ontology
| Molecular function | heparin binding; zinc ion binding; metal ion binding; peptidase activity; metalloendopeptidase activity; hydrolase activity; serine-type endopeptidase activity; protein binding; metallopeptidase activity |
| Cellular component | extracellular matrix; extracellular region; cell surface; extracellular exosome; extracellular space |
| Biological process | maternal process involved in female pregnancy; estrous cycle; ageing; extracellular matrix disassembly; cellular response to mechanical stimulus; response to nutrient levels; collagen catabolic process; proteolysis; antibacterial peptide secretion; extracellular matrix organization |
Sources:Amigo / QuickGO
Orthologs
| Databases | NCBI: entry; OMA: entry |
| Species | Human | Mouse |
| Entrez | 4316 | 17393 |
| Ensembl | ENSG00000137673 | ENSMUSG00000018623 |
| UniProt | P09237 | Q10738; Q3UN27 |
| RefSeq (mRNA) | NM_002423 | NM_010810; NM_001319986 |
| RefSeq (protein) | NP_002414 | NP_001306915; NP_034940 |
| Location (UCSC) | Chr 11: 102.52 – 102.53 Mb | Chr 9: 7.69 – 7.7 Mb |
| PubMed search |
- Wikidata
| View/Edit Human | View/Edit Mouse |

Matrilysin

Identifiers
- EC no.: 3.4.24.23
- CAS no.: 141256-52-2

Databases
- BRENDA: enzyme data
- ExPASy: NiceZyme view
- KEGG: enzyme entry
- MetaCyc: metabolic pathway
- Rhea: reactions
- PDB structures: RCSB PDB PDBe PDBsum
Search
- PMC: articles
- PubMed: articles
- NCBI: proteins

Matrilysin also known as matrix metalloproteinase-7 (MMP-7), pump-1 protease (PUMP-1), or uterine metalloproteinase is an enzyme in humans that is encoded by the MMP7 gene. The enzyme (EC 3.4.24.23) has also been known as matrin, putative (or punctuated) metalloproteinase-1, matrix metalloproteinase pump 1, PUMP-1 proteinase, PUMP, metalloproteinase pump-1, putative metalloproteinase, MMP). Human MMP-7 has a molecular weight around 30 kDa.

Matrilysin was discovered by Sellers and Woessner in the uterus of the rat in 1988. The complementary DNA (cDNA) of human MMP7 was isolated in 1988 by Muller et al. MMP7 is a member of the matrix metalloproteinase (MMP) family consisting of structural-related zinc-dependent endopeptidases. The primary role of cleaved/activated MMP7 is to break down extracellular matrix by degrading macromolecules including casein, type I, II, IV, and V gelatins, fibronectin, and proteoglycan.

== Gene, regulation, and expression ==
The human MMP7 is located on chromosome 11 q22.3. MMP genes are clustered in q region of human Chromosome 11 including matrilysin, collagenase-1, stromelysin1, stromelysin-2, and metalloelastase genes. It consists of 267 amino acids. The cDNA of MMP7 is 49% homologous to stromelysin-1. Comparing to other members of MMP family, MMP7 does not have a C-terminal protein domain.

The promoter of the human MMP7 contains a TATA box, an activator protein 1 (AP-1) site, and two inverted polyomavirus enhancer A-binding proteins 2 (PEA-3). The AP-1/PEA-3 binding motif is required and essential for MMP7 to be responsive to growth factors, oncogenes and phorbol ester. Also, the PEA and AP-1 are required for Matrilysin/CAT reporter constructs induced by tumor promoter 12-O-tetradecanoulphorbol-13-acetate (TPA) and epidermal growth factor (EGF). In addition, the high level expression of AP-1 and its binding proteins were found to be associated with mutant Ki-Ras suggesting the high expression of matrilysin in Ras activated cells is AP-1 dependent.

The expression of MMP7 is regulated by the Wnt/ β catenin signaling pathway, and mediated by transformation growth factor β (TGF-β). TGF-β stimulates ECM and suppresses the steady-state level of MMP7, stromelysin mRNAs, and secretion of zymogens. The isoforms of TGF-β inhibit MMP7 mRNA and protein in the human endometrium via progesterone mediated pathway. However, the opposite effects of TGF-β on MMP7 were observed among transformed cells. In human glioma cell lines and human squamous cell carcinoma cell line II-4, TGF-β stimulates the expression of MMP7 mRNA and proteins, and facilitates the invasive behavior of cells.

The promoter region of the human MMP7 gene contains two or more sites that are homologous to the NR-IL6 binding sequences indicating MMP7 can bind to IL-1 and IL-6. In addition, the level of MMP7 mRNA is elevated followed the treatment of tumor necrosis factor α (TNF- α) and IL-1 β in human mesangial cells.

MMP7 are commonly expressed in epithelial cells including ductal epithelium of exocrine glands in skin, salivary glands, pancreas, glandular epithelium of intestine and reproductive organ, liver, and breast. In addition, MMP7 is highly expressed in the luminal surface of dysplastic glands in human colorectal cancers.

== Structure ==
A MMP7 protein is bounded by four metal ions including a catalytic zinc ion, a structural zinc ion, and two calcium ions. The catalytic zinc ion binds to three His residues in the HEXGHXXGXXH region in tetracoordination. The calcium ion binding play important role in stabilizing the secondary structure. MMP7 has a shallow hydrophobic substrate-binding pocket. In contrast to MMP9 which has the longest hinge, MMP7 lacks hemopexin and does not have a hinge. Instead, MMP7 contains a variable C-terminal hemopexin-like domain facilitates substrate specificity. The protein of MMP7 is secreted as zymogen. The prodoamin of MMP7 contains an approximately 9 kD highly conserved "cysteine switch" PRCGXPD sequence near the C-terminal containing cysteine residues. Cysteine residues bind to the catalytic zinc keeping the protein latent. The dissociation of cysteine –Zinc coordination starts from the cleavage of the first 30 amino acids of the prodomain, which leads to a conformation change, and further results in autoproteolysis and the cleavage of the whole prodomain at Glu-Tyr site. According to Woessner et al., the Mr of MMP7 is 28,000 for the latent form and 19,000 Mr for the active form after the cleavage of its prodomain.

== Interactions ==
Promatrilysin (Pro-MMP7) is converted from the latent form to the active form by endoproteinases, and plasmin. Plasmin cleaves at the site recognizable to trypsin, is considered as the most possible physiological activator. In vitro, plasmin can activate pro-MMP7 to 50% of its full activity. Also, researchers used activated recombinant pro-MMP7 and purified substrates to investigate the proteolytic activity of MMp7 in vitro, and found that MMP7 cleaves many protein substrates mainly including ECM components, proMMPs, and nonmatrix proteins. MMP7 cleaves the glycoprotein entactin that links laminin and collagen IV at about 100-600 times faster than collagenase-1. In addition, MMP7 can activate other MMPs. Activated MMP7 and APMA can increase the activity of collagenase-1, and MMP7 can also convert the latent progelatinase A to its active form.

== Function ==
Proteins of the matrix metalloproteinase (MMP) family are involved in the breakdown of extracellular matrix in normal physiological processes, such as embryonic development, reproduction, and tissue remodeling, as well as in disease processes, such as arthritis and metastasis. Most MMP's are secreted as inactive proproteins which are activated when cleaved by extracellular proteinases. The enzyme encoded by this gene degrades proteoglycans, fibronectin, elastin and casein and differs from most MMP family members in that it lacks a conserved C-terminal protein domain. The enzyme is involved in wound healing, and studies in mice suggest that it regulates the activity of defensins in intestinal mucosa.

MMP7 was initially characterized by Woessner et al. It digests components of the extracellular matrix, cleaves the α 2 (I) chain of gelatin more rapidly, and digests the B chain of insulin at Ala^{14}-Leu and Tyr^{16}-Leu, and has no action on collagen types I, II, IV, V. The optimal pH of MMP7 is at 7 and the pI is at 5.9. MMP4 is inhibited by α 2-macroglobulin and TIMP. The inhibition of MMP7 activity commonly relies on metal-chelating agents including EDTA and 1,10-phenanthroline, especially zinc chelation. Therefore, the selectivity of MMP7 inhibition is challenging since almost all members of MMPs family contain catalytic domains with zinc binding sites. TIMP-1 and 2 noncovalently bound to active MMP7 at the catalytic site inhibiting MMP7 activity. The activated MMP7 can also cleave the propeptides of proMMP2 and proMMP9 to facilitate tumor invasion.

=== Normal tissue development ===
Quondamatteo et al. immunohistochemically stained MMP7, and localized MMP7 in early human liver development. They reported that MMP7 was presented in some hepatocytes and endothelial cells in the 6th gestational week, and only hematopoietic cells remained after that time.

=== Tissue remodeling ===
In order for MMPs to escape TIMP inhibition, active MMP7s are recruited to the plasma membrane of epithelium inducing membrane-associated growth factors processing for epithelial repair and proliferation. In human endometrium, the expression of MMP7 mRNA increases at menstruation and remains high during the proliferative phase. Also, MMP-7 binds to the plasma membrane of epithelium containing cholesterol-rich domain. The bounded MMP7 is active and resistant to TIMP inhibition. It promotes the activity of the epithelial plasma membrane and associated substrates including E-cadherin, β4-integrin, TNF-alpha, RAS, heparin-binding EGF, IGF binding proteins and plasminogen. Further, this process promotes epithelial cell migration, proliferation and apoptosis. For menstruation, it promotes the endometrium regeneration after menstrual breakdown. Huang et al. reported that the proteolytic activity of MMP7 plays major role in tissue remodeling in biliary atresia-associated liver fibrosis.

== Clinical significance ==
MMP7 cleaves collagen III/IV/V/IX/X/XI and proteoglycan indicating that MMP inhibitors can potentially be used in therapies that are involved in inhibition of tissue degradation, remodeling, anti-angiogenesis and inhibition of tumor invasion.

=== Role in Cancer ===
MMP7 is found to potentially be involved in tumor metastasis and inflammatory processes. The upregulation of MMP7 is associated with many malignant tumors including esophagus, stomach, colon, liver, pancreas, and renal cell carcinomas. High MMP7 expression facilitates cancer invasion and angiogenesis by degrading extracellular matrix macromolecules and connective tissues. These degradations are associated with many mechanisms including embryogenesis, postpartum uterine involution, tissue repair, angiogenesis, bone remodeling, arthritis, decubitus ulcer, and tumor metastasis/invasion. Activated MMP7 activates MMP2 and MMP9 zymogens, and mediates the proteolytic process of the precursors of tumor necrosis factors and urokinase plasminogen activators.

=== Colon cancer and MMP7 expression ===
MMP7 cleaves cell surface proteins, promotes adhesion of cancer cells, and increases the potential of tumor metastasis. Higashi et al. reported that the binding of MMP7 to cholesterol sulfate on the cell surface plays a critical role in the cell membrane-related proteolytic action. Also, the internal Ile 29, Arg33, Arg51, and Trp 55 and 171-173 residues at MMP7 C-terminal located on the opposite side of the catalytic site of MMP7 are required for cholesterol sulfate binding. Wild type MMP7 can digest fibronectin, but mutant MMP7 fails to induce the aggregation of colon cancer cells. In addition, Qasim et al. reported that MMP7 is highly expressed in advanced colorectal adenomatous polys with severe dysplasia. Further, MMP7 is involved in converting colorectal adenomas into malignant state and facilitating the growth.
