= MMP15 =

Protein-coding gene in the species Homo sapiens

Identifiers
- Aliases: MMP15, MT2-MMP, MTMMP2, SMCP-2, MMP-15, MT2MMP, matrix metallopeptidase 15
- External IDs: OMIM: 602261; MGI: 109320; HomoloGene: 20549; GeneCards: MMP15; OMA:MMP15 - orthologs

Gene location (Human)
Chr.	Chromosome 16 (human)
Band	16q21	Start	58,025,754 bp
Band	16q21	End	58,046,901 bp

Gene location (Mouse)
Chr.	Chromosome 8 (mouse)
Band	8 C5|8 47.12 cM	Start	96,078,896 bp
Band	8 C5|8 47.12 cM	End	96,101,708 bp
RNA expression pattern
Bgee	Human / Mouse (ortholog); Top expressed in: mucosa of transverse colon; apex of heart; right lobe of thyroid gland; left lobe of thyroid gland; right lobe of liver; left ventricle; right testis; left testis; right auricle of heart; body of stomach / Top expressed in: external carotid artery; internal carotid artery; epithelium of stomach; Paneth cell; trigeminal ganglion; atrium; supraoptic nucleus; aortic valve; conjunctival fornix; lumbar spinal ganglion; More reference expression data
BioGPS	n/a
Gene ontology
Molecular function	zinc ion binding; metal ion binding; peptidase activity; protein binding; enzyme activator activity; metalloendopeptidase activity; hydrolase activity; metallopeptidase activity; metalloaminopeptidase activity
Cellular component	integral component of membrane; membrane; extracellular matrix; plasma membrane; integral component of plasma membrane; extracellular space
Biological process	response to estradiol; endodermal cell differentiation; extracellular matrix disassembly; collagen catabolic process; positive regulation of catalytic activity; proteolysis; extracellular matrix organization
Sources:Amigo / QuickGO
Orthologs
Species	Human	Mouse
Entrez	4324	17388
Ensembl	ENSG00000102996	ENSMUSG00000031790
UniProt	P51511	O54732
RefSeq (mRNA)	NM_002428	NM_008609
RefSeq (protein)	NP_002419	NP_032635
Location (UCSC)	Chr 16: 58.03 – 58.05 Mb	Chr 8: 96.08 – 96.1 Mb
PubMed search
- Wikidata
View/Edit Human	View/Edit Mouse

Matrix metalloproteinase 15 also known as MMP15 is an enzyme that in humans is encoded by the MMP15 gene.

== Function ==
Proteins of the matrix metalloproteinase (MMP) family are involved in the breakdown of extracellular matrix in normal physiological processes, such as embryonic development, reproduction, and tissue remodeling, as well as in disease processes, such as arthritis and metastasis. Most MMP's are secreted as inactive proenzymes which are activated when cleaved by extracellular proteinases. However, the protein encoded by this gene is a member of the membrane-type MMP (MT-MMP) subfamily; members of this subfamily can be anchored to the extracellular membrane by either a transmembrane domain or glycophosphatidylinositol linkage, suggesting that these proteins are expressed at the cell surface rather than secreted in a soluble form.
