= MMP27 =

Protein-coding gene in the species Homo sapiens

Identifiers
- Aliases: MMP27, MMP-27, matrix metallopeptidase 27
- External IDs: OMIM: 618101; MGI: 3039232; HomoloGene: 23345; GeneCards: MMP27; OMA:MMP27 - orthologs

Gene location (Human)
Chr.	Chromosome 11 (human)
Band	11q22.2	Start	102,691,487 bp
Band	11q22.2	End	102,705,769 bp

Gene location (Mouse)
Chr.	Chromosome 9 (mouse)
Band	9|9 A1	Start	7,571,397 bp
Band	9|9 A1	End	7,581,886 bp
RNA expression pattern
Bgee	Human / Mouse (ortholog); Top expressed in: skin of hip; skin of thigh; minor salivary glands; Achilles tendon; skin of abdomen; tibialis anterior muscle; subcutaneous adipose tissue; muscle tissue; striated muscle tissue; skeletal muscle tissue / Top expressed in: granulocyte; zone of skin; white adipose tissue; muscle of thigh; liver; quadriceps femoris muscle; muscle tissue; skeletal muscle tissue; lip; lung; More reference expression data
BioGPS	n/a
Gene ontology
Molecular function	zinc ion binding; peptidase activity; metalloendopeptidase activity; hydrolase activity; metallopeptidase activity; metal ion binding
Cellular component	extracellular matrix; extrinsic component of endoplasmic reticulum membrane; endoplasmic reticulum membrane; endoplasmic reticulum; membrane; extracellular space
Biological process	collagen catabolic process; proteolysis; extracellular matrix organization
Sources:Amigo / QuickGO
Orthologs
Species	Human	Mouse
Entrez	64066	234911
Ensembl	ENSG00000137675	ENSMUSG00000070323
UniProt	Q9H306	n/a
RefSeq (mRNA)	NM_022122	NM_001030289; NM_001310717
RefSeq (protein)	NP_071405	n/a
Location (UCSC)	Chr 11: 102.69 – 102.71 Mb	Chr 9: 7.57 – 7.58 Mb
PubMed search
- Wikidata
View/Edit Human	View/Edit Mouse

Matrix metallopeptidase 27 also known as MMP-27 is an enzyme which in humans is encoded by the MMP27 gene.

== Structure ==
MMP-27 was discovered and cloned in 1998 by Yang and Kurkinen. Initially compared to the so-called Chicken MMP (CMMP), MMP-27 actually shows very little sequence homology with this protease. Sequence homology predicts that the human MMP-27 gene encodes the canonical domains shared by most MMPs (annotation based on Uniprot entry Q9H306): (i) a signal peptide (residues 1-17), (ii) a propeptide (18-98) containing the cysteine switch motif (89-96), (iii) a catalytic domain (99-263) containing the typical HEXXHXXGXXH motif of the metzincins (M10 and M12 families of the MEROPS[2] database), (iv) a proline-rich hinge region (264-278) and (v) a hemopexin-like domain (279-465) folded as a four-bladed β-propeller through disulfide bond formation between the two flanking Cys residues (Cys279 and Cys465). MMP-27 could be classified in the stromelysin group of MMPs, since MMP-27 shows 51,6% homology with stromelysin-2 (MMP-10) and localizes in the cluster of MMPs located on chromosome 11.

Like the six known MT-MMPs, human MMP-27 is prolonged by an additional C-terminal domain (466-513). The Spoctopus algorithm for topological prediction suggests that this C-terminal extension (CTE) includes a potential transmembrane domain (490-510). However, this sequence is less hydrophobic than in transmembrane MT-MMPs (MMP-14, -15, -16 and -24) as it contains hydrophilic/charged residues, in particular His492, Lys493, His504 and Lys507.

== Function ==
Proteins of the matrix metalloproteinase (MMP) family are involved in the breakdown of extracellular matrix in normal physiological processes, such as embryonic development, reproduction, and tissue remodeling, as well as in disease processes, such as arthritis and metastasis. Most MMPs are secreted as inactive proproteins which are activated when cleaved by extracellular proteinases.

Cominelli A. and colleagues demonstrated that MMP-27 is an unusual protease which is not secreted and is efficiently retained in the endoplasmic reticulum in three mammalian cell lines. Deletion mutants and swapping with recombinant MMP-10 demonstrate that the unique MMP-27 C-terminal extension (CTE) is necessary and sufficient for endoplasmic reticulum retention but does not provide a stable membrane anchorage. Despite sequence homology with MT-MMPs, the CTE is not a transmembrane domain and does not interact permanently with membrane. This unique feature for an MMP raises important questions about potential functions of MMP-27, which remains to be investigated.

== Clinical significance ==
Sparse information about MMP-27 expression was found in studies of gene expression profiling (micro-array) or in expression pattern analysis of MMP family members during developmental, physiological or pathological processes. MMP-27 transcript is detected in almost every tissue, except the brain, with the highest expression found in the liver during mouse development In the adult, MMP-27 mRNA is mostly abundant in anti-IgG/IgM stimulated B lymphocytes, bone and kidney but is present at lower levels in the heart.

A recent investigation of the transcriptome from distinct tissue compartments of the menstrual endometrium disclosed specific MMP-27 overexpression in areas of stromal breakdown. In another transcriptomic study, MMP-27 was found to be increased in the human endometrium at the end of the secretory phase, before menstruation. Moreover, MMP-27 expression is down-regulated in macrophages when co-cultured with ovarian cancer cells but up-regulated in cartilages from patients with osteoarthritis or in abdominal aortic aneurysms. MMP-27 was also identified, at the protein level, in MDA-MB-231 breast cancer cell line and in primary human breast cancer. Recently, MMP-27 has been demonstrated to be expressed by CD163^{+}/CD206^{+} macrophages in the human endometrium and in superficial endometriotic lesions.
