= Interstitial collagenase =

Enzyme

Identifiers
- Aliases: MMP1, CLG, CLGN, matrix metallopeptidase 1
- External IDs: OMIM: 120353; MGI: 1933846; GeneCards: MMP1
Available structures
PDB	Ortholog search: PDBe RCSB
PDB	List of PDB id codes 1AYK, 1CGE, 1CGF, 1CGL, 1HFC, 1SU3, 2AYK, 2CLT, 2J0T, 2TCL, 3AYK, 3SHI, 4AUO, 4AYK
Enzyme activity
EC #	BRENDA	ExPASy	KEGG	MetaCyc
3.4.24.7	↗	↗	↗	↗

Gene location (Human)
Chr.	Chromosome 11 (human)
Band	11q22.2	Start	102,789,401 bp
Band	11q22.2	End	102,798,160 bp

Gene location (Mouse)
Chr.	Chromosome 9 (mouse)
Band	9|9 A1	Start	7,464,141 bp
Band	9|9 A1	End	7,476,857 bp
RNA expression pattern
Bgee	Human / Mouse (ortholog); Top expressed in: pancreatic epithelial cell; pancreatic ductal cell; islet of Langerhans; cartilage tissue; beta cell; synovial membrane of articular capsule of synovial joint; gallbladder; stromal cell of endometrium; amniotic fluid; pylorus / Top expressed in: trophoblast giant cell; placenta; blastocyst; decidua; gastrula; grey matter; structure with developmental contribution from neural crest; prosencephalon; cerebrum; cerebral hemisphere; More reference expression data
BioGPS	More reference expression data
Gene ontology
Molecular function	peptidase activity; zinc ion binding; endopeptidase activity; metalloendopeptidase activity; hydrolase activity; metallopeptidase activity; metal ion binding; serine-type endopeptidase activity
Cellular component	extracellular matrix; extracellular region; extracellular space
Biological process	collagen catabolic process; extracellular matrix disassembly; viral process; leukocyte migration; proteolysis; positive regulation of protein oligomerization; cytokine-mediated signaling pathway; extracellular matrix organization
Sources:Amigo / QuickGO
Orthologs
Databases	NCBI: entry; OMA: entry
Species	Human	Mouse
Entrez	4312	83995
Ensembl	ENSG00000196611	ENSMUSG00000043089
UniProt	P03956	Q9EPL5
RefSeq (mRNA)	NM_002421; NM_001145938	NM_032006
RefSeq (protein)	NP_001139410; NP_002412	NP_114395
Location (UCSC)	Chr 11: 102.79 – 102.8 Mb	Chr 9: 7.46 – 7.48 Mb
PubMed search
- Wikidata
View/Edit Human	View/Edit Mouse

Interstitial collagenase, also known as fibroblast collagenase and matrix metalloproteinase-1 (MMP-1), is an enzyme that in humans is encoded by the MMP1 gene. The gene is part of a cluster of MMP genes which localize to chromosome 11q22.3. MMP-1 was the first vertebrate collagenase both purified to homogeneity as a protein, and cloned as a cDNA. MMP-1 has an estimated molecular mass of 54 kDa.

== Structure ==
MMP-1 has an archetypal structure consisting of a pre-domain, a pro-domain, a catalytic domain, a linker region and a hemopexin-like domain. The primary structure of MMP-1 was first published by Goldberg, G I, et al. Two main nomenclatures for the primary structure are currently in use, the original one from which the first amino-acid starts with the signalling peptide and a second one where the first amino-acid starts counting from the prodomain (proenzyme nomenclature).

=== Catalytic domain ===
The catalytic domains of MMPs share very similar characteristics, having a general shape of oblate ellipsoid with a diameter of ~40 Å. Despite the similarity of the catalytic domains of MMPs, this entry will focus only on the structural features of MMP-1 catalytic domain.

==== Overall structural characteristics ====
The catalytic domain of MMP-1 is composed of five highly twisted β-strands (sI-sV), three α-helix (hA-hC) and a total of eight loops, enclosing a total of five metal ions, three Ca^{2+} and two Zn^{2+}, one of which with catalytic role.

The catalytic domain (CAT) of MMP-1 starts with the F100 (non-truncated CAT) as the first amino-acid of the N-terminal loop of the CAT domain. The first published x-ray structure of the CAT domain was representative of the truncated form of this domain, where the first 7 amino-acids are not present.

After the initial loop, the sequences follows to the first and longest β-sheet (sI). A second loop precedes large "amphipathic α-helix" (hA) that longitudinally spans protein site. The β-strands sII and sIII follows separated by the respective loops, loop 4 being commonly designated as "short loop" bridging sII to sIII. Following the sIII strand the sequence meets the 'S-shaped double loop' that is of primary importance for the peptide structure and catalytic activity (see further) as it extends to the cleft side "bulge", continuing to the only antiparallel β-strand sIV, which is prime importance for binding peptidic substrates or inhibitors by forming main chain hydrogen bond. Following sIV, loop Gln186-Gly192 and β-strand sV are responsible for contributing with many ligands to the several metal ions present in the protein (read further). A large open loop follows sV which has proven importance in substrate specificity within the MMPs family. A specific region (183)RWTNNFREY(191) has been identified as a critical segment of matrix metalloproteinase 1 for the expression of collagenolytic activity. On C-terminal part of the CAT Domain the hB α-helix, known as the "active-site helix" encompasses part of the "zinc-binding consensus sequence" HEXXHXXGXXH that is characteristic of the Metzincin superfamily. The α-helix hB finishes abruptly at Gly225 where the last loop of the domain starts. This last loop contains the "specificity loop" which is the shortest in the MMPs family. The Catalytic Domain ends at Gly261 with α-helix hC.

== Function ==
MMPs are involved in the breakdown of extracellular matrix in normal physiological processes, such as embryonic development, reproduction, and tissue remodeling, as well as in disease processes, such as arthritis and metastasis. Specifically, MMP-1 breaks down the interstitial collagens, types I, II, and III. It is of interest in the study of numerous conditions including aging, skin cancer, arthritis, emphysema, hypertension and periodontal diseases.

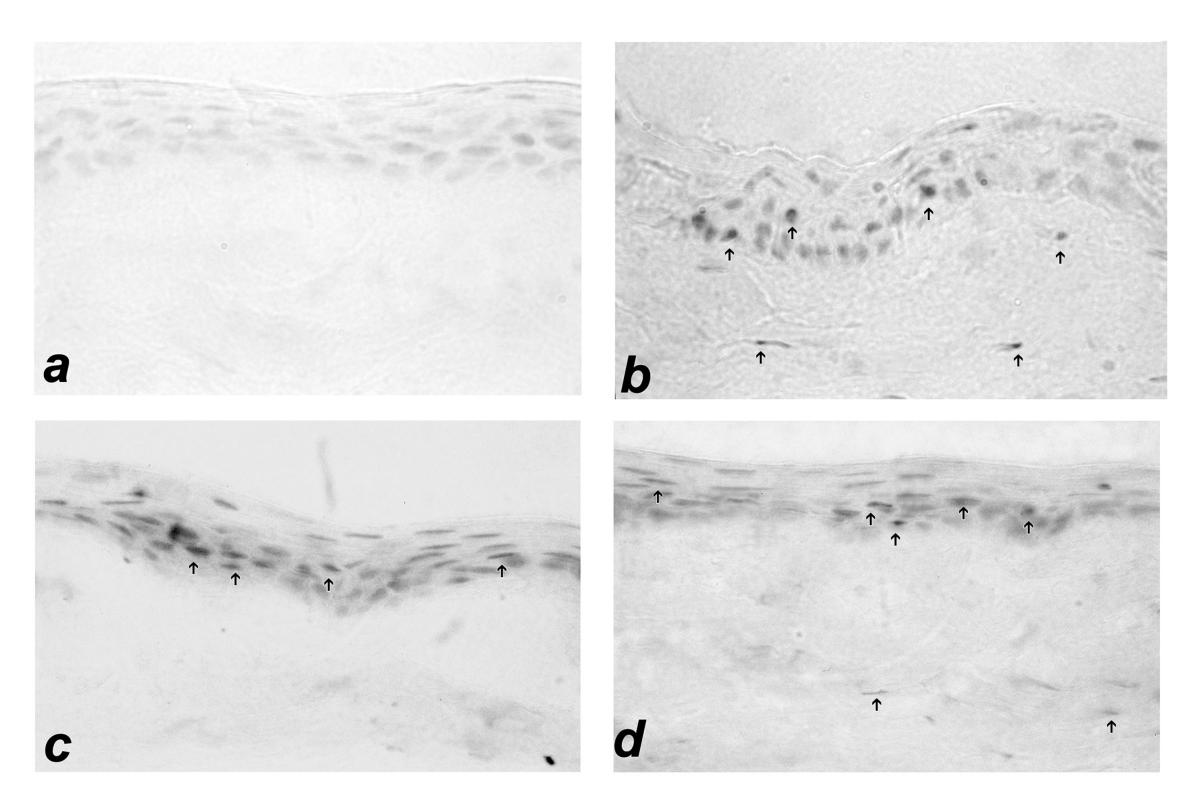
Induction of matrix metalloproteinase 1 in rat corneas by ciprofloxacin, ofloxacin and levofloxacin (b,c,d) compared to artificial tears (a). Reviglio et al., 2003.

== Regulation ==
Mechanical force may increase the expression of MMP1 in human periodontal ligament cells. During cancer progression, MMP1 can be dysregulated by different mechanisms, including the activation of an insulator element located between MMP8 and MMP10 genes.

== Interactions ==
MMP1 has been shown to interact with CD49b.

== Ligands ==
=== Inhibitors ===
- Ageladine A
- Batimastat
- CGS 27023A
- Cordycepin (inhibits MMP-1 among numerous other biological activities)
- Doxycycline (mainly active as antibiotic, numerous side effects including inhibition of MMP-1)
- F81-1144b
- Hydrangenol
- Ilomastat
- Marimastat
- Prinomastat (weak inhibition of MMP-1 compared to MMP-2, 3, 9, 13, and 14)
- RO314724
- RS-104966
- Santamarin
- Tremulacin
