= Adamalysin =

Class of enzymes

Identifiers
- EC no.: 3.4.24.46
- CAS no.: 74812-51-4

Databases
- IntEnz: IntEnz view
- BRENDA: BRENDA entry
- ExPASy: NiceZyme view
- KEGG: KEGG entry
- MetaCyc: metabolic pathway
- PRIAM: profile
- PDB structures: RCSB PDB PDBe PDBsum
Search
- PMC: articles
- PubMed: articles
- NCBI: proteins

Adamalysin (EC 3.4.24.46, Crotalus adamanteus metalloendopeptidase, proteinase I and II, Crotalus adamanteus venom proteinase II, adamalysin II) is an enzyme. This enzyme catalyses the following chemical reaction

Cleavage of Phe^{1}-Val, His^{5}-Leu, His^{10}-Leu, Ala^{14}-Leu, Leu^{15}-Tyr, and Tyr^{16}-Leu of insulin B chain

This enzyme is present in the venom of the eastern diamondback rattlesnake (Crotalus adamanteus).

== See also ==
- A disintegrin and metalloproteinase
