= MMP25 =

Protein-coding gene in the species Homo sapiens

Identifiers
- Aliases: MMP25, MMP-25, MMP20, MMP20A, MMPL1, MT-MMP 6, MT-MMP6, MT6-MMP, MT6MMP, MTMMP6, matrix metallopeptidase 25
- External IDs: OMIM: 608482; MGI: 2443938; HomoloGene: 23375; GeneCards: MMP25; OMA:MMP25 - orthologs

Gene location (Mouse)
| Chr. | Chromosome 17 (mouse) |
| Band | 17|17 A3.3 | Start | 23,847,285 bp |
| Band | 17|17 A3.3 | End | 23,864,251 bp |
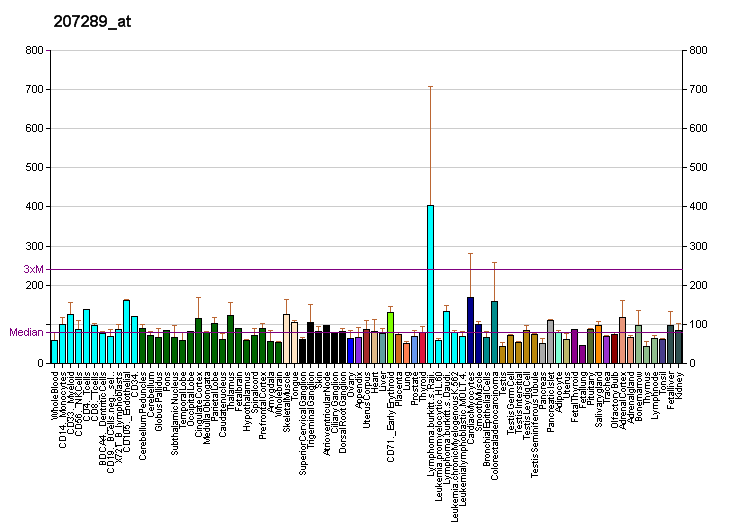
RNA expression pattern
| Bgee | Human / Mouse (ortholog); Top expressed in: blood; spleen; vena cava; olfactory bulb; sperm; periodontal fiber; appendix; body of tongue; cervix epithelium; bone marrow / Top expressed in: granulocyte; epiblast; bone marrow; trigeminal ganglion; embryo; embryo; morula; tail of embryo; thymus; neural tube; More reference expression data |
| BioGPS | More reference expression data |
Gene ontology
| Molecular function | zinc ion binding; peptidase activity; metalloendopeptidase activity; hydrolase activity; metallopeptidase activity; metal ion binding |
| Cellular component | integral component of membrane; extracellular region; anchored component of membrane; membrane; plasma membrane; specific granule membrane; extracellular matrix; extracellular space |
| Biological process | inflammatory response; hard palate development; proteolysis; neutrophil degranulation; extracellular matrix organization; collagen catabolic process |
Sources:Amigo / QuickGO
Orthologs
| Species | Human | Mouse |
| Entrez | 64386 | 240047 |
| Ensembl | n/a | ENSMUSG00000023903 |
| UniProt | Q9NPA2 | Q3U435 |
| RefSeq (mRNA) | NM_004142; NM_022468; NM_022718 | NM_001033339; NM_001320258 |
| RefSeq (protein) | NP_071913 | NP_001028511; NP_001307187 |
| Location (UCSC) | n/a | Chr 17: 23.85 – 23.86 Mb |
| PubMed search |
- Wikidata
| View/Edit Human | View/Edit Mouse |

Matrix metalloproteinase-25 is an enzyme that in humans is encoded by the MMP25 gene.

Proteins of the matrix metalloproteinase (MMP) family are involved in the breakdown of extracellular matrix in normal physiological processes, such as embryonic development, reproduction, and tissue remodeling, as well as in disease processes, such as arthritis and metastasis. Most MMPs are secreted as inactive proproteins that are activated when cleaved by extracellular proteinases. However, the protein encoded by this gene is a member of the membrane-type MMP (MT-MMP) subfamily, attached to the plasma membrane via a glycosylphosphatidyl inositol anchor. In response to bacterial infection or inflammation, the encoded protein is thought to inactivate alpha-1 proteinase inhibitor, a major tissue protectant against proteolytic enzymes released by activated neutrophils, facilitating the transendothelial migration of neutrophils to inflammatory sites. The encoded protein may also play a role in tumor invasion and metastasis through activation of MMP2. The gene has previously been referred to as MMP20 but has been renamed MMP25.
