= MMP28 =

Protein-coding gene in the species Homo sapiens

Identifiers
- Aliases: MMP28, EPILYSIN, MM28, MMP-25, MMP-28, MMP25, matrix metallopeptidase 28
- External IDs: OMIM: 608417; MGI: 2153062; HomoloGene: 41559; GeneCards: MMP28; OMA:MMP28 - orthologs

Gene location (Human)
Chr.	Chromosome 17 (human)
Band	17q12	Start	35,756,249 bp
Band	17q12	End	35,795,707 bp

Gene location (Mouse)
Chr.	Chromosome 11 (mouse)
Band	11|11 C	Start	83,331,594 bp
Band	11|11 C	End	83,353,897 bp
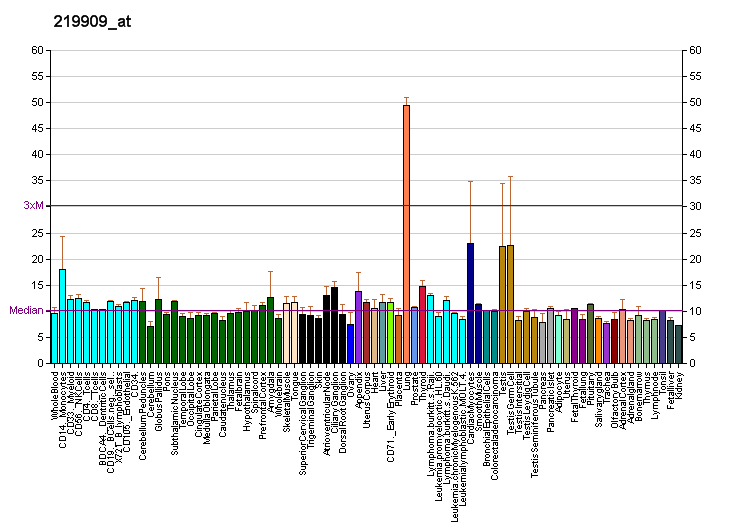
RNA expression pattern
Bgee	Human / Mouse (ortholog); Top expressed in: tibial nerve; right testis; left testis; skin of abdomen; transverse colon; right lung; upper lobe of left lung; rectum; mucosa of transverse colon; skin of leg / Top expressed in: Paneth cell; esophagus; lip; embryo; stomach; muscle of thigh; brown adipose tissue; transitional epithelium of urinary bladder; ascending aorta; aortic valve; More reference expression data
BioGPS	More reference expression data
Gene ontology
Molecular function	peptidase activity; hydrolase activity; metallopeptidase activity; metalloendopeptidase activity; zinc ion binding; metal ion binding; protein binding
Cellular component	extracellular region; cytoplasm; extracellular matrix; collagen-containing extracellular matrix; extracellular space
Biological process	proteolysis; negative regulation of macrophage chemotaxis; extracellular matrix organization; collagen catabolic process
Sources:Amigo / QuickGO
Orthologs
Species	Human	Mouse
Entrez	79148	118453
Ensembl	ENSG00000278843; ENSG00000271447	ENSMUSG00000020682
UniProt	Q9H239	n/a
RefSeq (mRNA)	NM_001032278; NM_024302; NM_032950	NM_080453; NM_172797; NM_001320300
RefSeq (protein)	NP_001027449; NP_077278; NP_116568; NP_116568.1	n/a
Location (UCSC)	Chr 17: 35.76 – 35.8 Mb	Chr 11: 83.33 – 83.35 Mb
PubMed search
- Wikidata
View/Edit Human	View/Edit Mouse

Matrix metalloproteinase 28 also known as epilysin is an enzyme that in humans is encoded by the MMP28 gene.

== Function ==
Matrix metalloproteinase 28, also known as epilysin, belongs to a family of proteins known as matrix metalloproteinases which are common to tissue regulation. Matrix metalloproteinases are commonly known to degrade the extracellular matrix, alongside regulating cell surface receptors MMP-28 releases growth factors and adhesion molecules to modulate inflammation. MMP-28 is unique in that it can be found in many regular tissues, denoting a potential role in maintaining the healthy structure and function of most tissue. MMPs commonly modulate their expression via negative and positive feedback loops as a result of releasing and responding to growth hormones.

MMP-28 is less frequently found in tissues such as the brain, colon, heart, and lungs. However, MMP-28 is expressed heavily in organs such as the testes. Epilysin is also found in high concentration in basal keratinocytes in injured skin, even at some distance away from the wound, showing a role in repairing damaged tissue. MMP-28 also can alter the cell membrane to become more adhesive, and not allowing the cell to migrate.

== Structure ==
MMP-28 is a 520 amino acid long protein. The estimated signal peptide sequence appears as a long tail of random coil coming off of the protein that helps to guide the protein to excretion with the sequence PRCGVTD. The zinc binding catalytic site is tucked within an alpha helix within the center of the protein with a HEIGHTLGLTH sequence at positions 240–250 with a hemopexin-like domain. Epilysin contains 8 exons, 5 of which are splice sites unique to MMP-28 and not used by any other metalloproteinase in the MMP family.

Epilysin contains 8 exons, 5 of which are splice sites unique to MMP-28 and not used by any other metalloproteinase in the MMP family.

The full amino acid sequence is listed on uniprot.

== Clinical implications ==
The overexpression of MMP-28 is linked to the metastasis of tumors in cancer. Expression of MMP-28 can be linked to tumor diameter, depth of invasion, and stage of metastasis. In patients with positive overexpression of MMP-28, survival may be significantly less likely compared to negative expression of this protein, making it a potentially important marker for proactive prognosis of some forms of cancer.

MMP-28 may also play an important role in the breakdown of myelin, an important component of nervous system functionality. Demyelination may interrupt nerve signaling or even halt it completely, which can create severe neurological effects such as multiple sclerosis transverse myelitis and neuromyelitis optica.
