= Hemopexin =

Human protein linked to hemoglobin

HPX

Identifiers
- Aliases: HPX, HX, hemopexin
- External IDs: OMIM: 142290; MGI: 105112; GeneCards: HPX

Gene location (Human)
Chr.	Chromosome 11 (human)
Band	11p15.4	Start	6,431,049 bp
Band	11p15.4	End	6,442,617 bp

Gene location (Mouse)
Chr.	Chromosome 7 (mouse)
Band	7|7 E3	Start	105,240,820 bp
Band	7|7 E3	End	105,249,344 bp
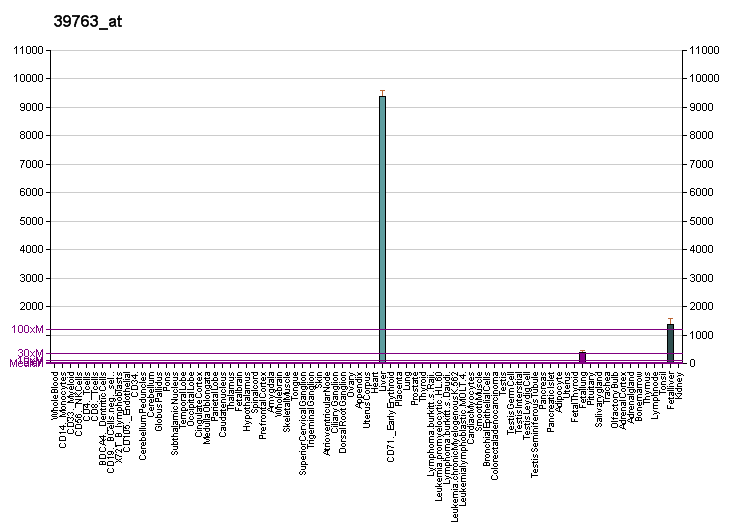

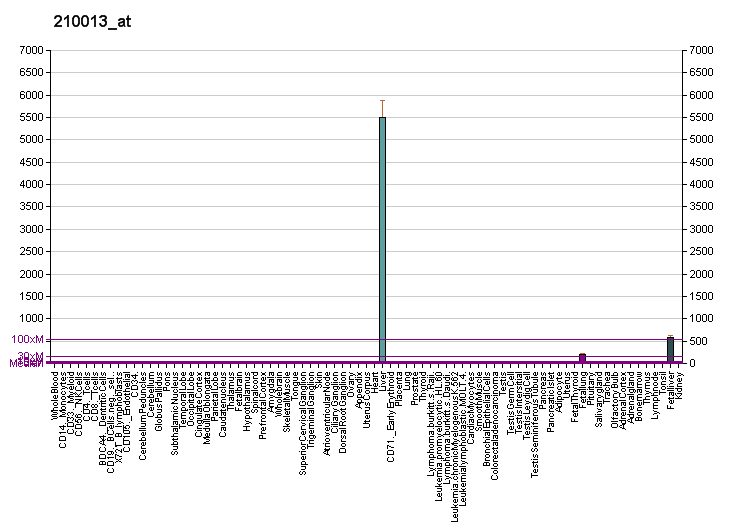
RNA expression pattern
Bgee	Human / Mouse (ortholog); Top expressed in: right lobe of liver; right uterine tube; testicle; right hemisphere of cerebellum; right coronary artery; olfactory zone of nasal mucosa; gonad; Descending thoracic aorta; tibial nerve; mucosa of transverse colon / Top expressed in: left lobe of liver; gallbladder; right lobe of liver; morula; fetal liver hematopoietic progenitor cell; human fetus; pyloric antrum; sexually immature organism; embryo; embryo; More reference expression data
BioGPS	More reference expression data
Gene ontology
Molecular function	heme transmembrane transporter activity; protein binding; metal ion binding; metallopeptidase activity
Cellular component	extracellular region; endocytic vesicle lumen; extracellular exosome; blood microparticle; extracellular space; collagen-containing extracellular matrix
Biological process	regulation of protein metabolic process; positive regulation of immunoglobulin production; positive regulation of interferon-gamma-mediated signaling pathway; positive regulation of humoral immune response mediated by circulating immunoglobulin; viral process; positive regulation of response to interferon-gamma; receptor-mediated endocytosis; hemoglobin metabolic process; heme transport; cellular iron ion homeostasis; heme metabolic process; positive regulation of tyrosine phosphorylation of STAT protein; transport; proteolysis
Sources:Amigo / QuickGO
Orthologs
Databases	NCBI: entry; OMA: entry
Species	Human	Mouse
Entrez	3263	15458
Ensembl	ENSG00000110169	ENSMUSG00000030895
UniProt	P02790	Q91X72
RefSeq (mRNA)	NM_000613	NM_017371
RefSeq (protein)	NP_000604	NP_059067
Location (UCSC)	Chr 11: 6.43 – 6.44 Mb	Chr 7: 105.24 – 105.25 Mb
PubMed search
- Wikidata
View/Edit Human	View/Edit Mouse

Hemopexin (or haemopexin; Hpx; Hx), also known as beta-1B-glycoprotein, is a glycoprotein that in humans is encoded by the HPX gene and belongs to the hemopexin family of proteins. Hemopexin is the plasma protein with the highest binding affinity for heme.

Hemoglobin itself circulating alone in the blood plasma (called free hemoglobin, as opposed to the hemoglobin situated in and circulating with the red blood cell.) will soon be oxidized into met-hemoglobin which then further disassociates into free heme along with globin chain. The free heme will then be oxidized into free met-heme and sooner or later the hemopexin will come to bind free met-heme together, forming a complex of met-heme and hemopexin, continuing their journey in the circulation until reaching a receptor, such as LRP1, on hepatocytes or macrophages within the spleen, liver and bone marrow.

Hemopexin's arrival and subsequent binding to the free heme not only prevent heme's pro-oxidant and pro-inflammatory effects but also promotes free heme's detoxification.

Hemopexin is different from haptoglobin, the latter always binds to free hemoglobin. (See Haptoglobin § Differentiation with hemopexin)

== Cloning, expression, and discovery ==
Takahashi et al. (1985) determined that human plasma hemopexin consists of a single polypeptide chain of 439 amino acids residues with six intrachain disulfide bridges and has a molecular mass of approximately 63 kD. The amino-terminal threonine residue is modified by a mucin-type O-linked galactosamine oligosaccharide, and the protein has five N-linked glycan modifications. The 18 tryptophan residues are arranged in four clusters, and 12 of the tryptophans are conserved in homologous positions. Computer-assisted analysis of the internal homology in amino acid sequence suggested duplication of an ancestral gene thus indicating that hemopexin consists of two similar halves.

Altruda et al. (1988) demonstrated that the HPX gene spans approximately 12 kb and is interrupted by 9 exons. The demonstration shows direct correspondence between exons and the 10 repeating units in the protein. The introns were not placed randomly; they fell in the center of the region of amino acid sequence homology in strikingly similar locations in 6 of the 10 units and in a symmetric position in each half of the coding sequence. From these observations, Altruda et al. (1988) concluded that the gene evolved through intron-mediated duplications of a primordial sequence to a 5-exon cluster.

== Mapping of hemopexin gene ==
Cai and Law (1986) prepared a cDNA clone for hemopexin, by Southern blot analysis of human/hamster hybrids containing different combinations of human chromosomes, assigned the HPX gene to human chromosome 11. Law et al. (1988) assigned the HPX gene to 11p15.5-p15.4, the same location as that of the beta-globin gene complex by in situ hybridization.

== Differential transcriptional pattern of hemopexin gene ==
In 1986, the expression of the human HPX gene in different human tissues and cell lines was carried out by using a specific cDNA probe. From the results obtained it was concluded that this gene was expressed in the liver and it was below the level of detection in other tissues or cell lines examined. By S1 mapping, the transcription initiation site in hepatic cells was located 28 base pairs upstream from the AUG initiation codon of the hemopexin gene.

== Function ==
Hemopexin binds heme with the highest affinity of any known protein. Its main function is scavenging the heme released or lost by the turnover of heme proteins such as hemoglobin and thus protects the body from the oxidative damage that free heme can cause. In addition, hemopexin releases its bound ligand for internalisation upon interacting with CD91. Hemopexin preserves the body's iron. Hemopexin -dependent uptake of extracellular heme can lead to the deactivation of Bach1 repression which leads to the transcriptional activation of antioxidant heme oxygenase-1 gene. Hemoglobin, haptoglobin (Hp) and Hx associate with high density lipoprotein (HDL) and influence the inflammatory properties of HDL. Hemopexin can downregulate the angiotensin II Type 1 receptor (AT1-R) in vitro.

== Clinical significance ==
The predominant source of circulating hemopexin is the liver with a plasma concentration of 1–2 mg/ml. Serum hemopexin level reflects how much heme is present in the blood. Therefore, a low hemopexin level indicates that there has been significant degradation of heme containing compounds. A low hemopexin level is one of the diagnostic features of an intravascular hemolytic anemia. Hemopexin has been implicated in cardiovascular disease, septic shock, cerebral ischemic injury, and experimental autoimmune encephalomyelitis. The circulating level of hemopexin is associated with prognosis in patients with septic shock.

HPX is also produced in the brain. Deletion of the HPX gene can aggravate brain injury followed by stroma-free hemoglobin-induced intracerebral haemorrhage. High hemopexin level in the cerebrospinal fluid is associated with poor outcome after subarachnoid hemorrhage.

Circulating hemopexin can modulate anthracycline-induced cardiotoxicity (e.g. heart failure) in both humans and mice.

== Relation to haptoglobin ==
In past there have been reports showing that in patients with sickle cell disease, spherocytosis, autoimmune hemolytic anemia, erythropoietic protoporphyria and pyruvate kinase deficiency, a decline in hemopexin concentration occurs in situations when haptoglobin (Hp) concentrations are low or depleted as a result of severe or prolonged hemolysis. Both haptoglobin and hemopexin are acute-phase proteins, the synthesis of which are induced during infection and after inflammatory states to minimize tissue injury and facilitate tissue repair. Hp and hemopexin prevent heme toxicity by binding themselves to heme prior to monocyte or macrophage's arrivals and ensuing clearances, which may explain their effects on outcome in several diseases, and underlies the rationale for exogenous haptoglobin and hemopexin as therapeutic proteins in hemolytic or hemorrhagic conditions. Hemopexin is the major vehicle for the transportation of heme in the plasma.

== See also ==
- Haptoglobin
- Haptoglobin-related protein
- Heme
- Hemoglobin
