= MMP16 =

Protein-coding gene in the species Homo sapiens

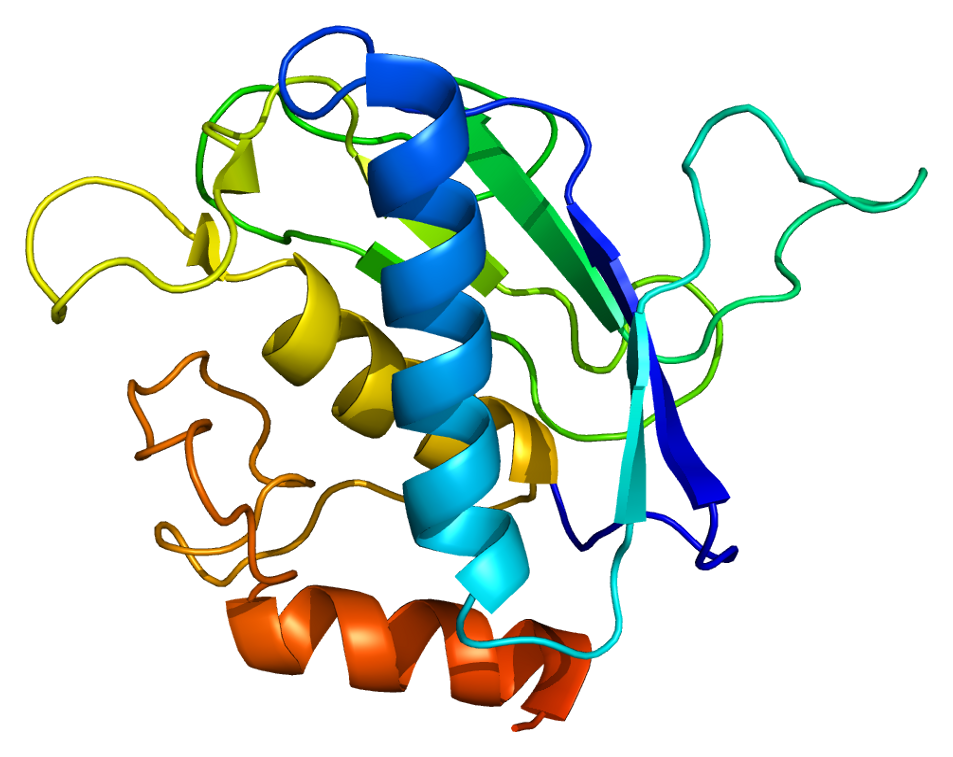
Available structures
PDB	Ortholog search: PDBe RCSB
PDB	List of PDB id codes 1RM8

Identifiers
- Aliases: MMP16, C8orf57, MMP-X2, MT-MMP2, MT-MMP3, MT3-MMP, matrix metallopeptidase 16
- External IDs: OMIM: 602262; MGI: 1276107; HomoloGene: 55939; GeneCards: MMP16; OMA:MMP16 - orthologs

Gene location (Human)
Chr.	Chromosome 8 (human)
Band	8q21.3	Start	88,032,011 bp
Band	8q21.3	End	88,328,025 bp

Gene location (Mouse)
Chr.	Chromosome 4 (mouse)
Band	4 A3|4 7.08 cM	Start	17,852,893 bp
Band	4 A3|4 7.08 cM	End	18,119,145 bp
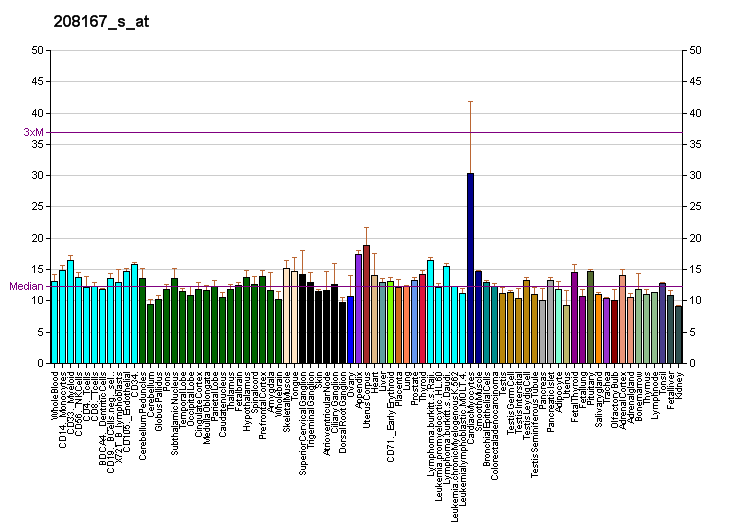

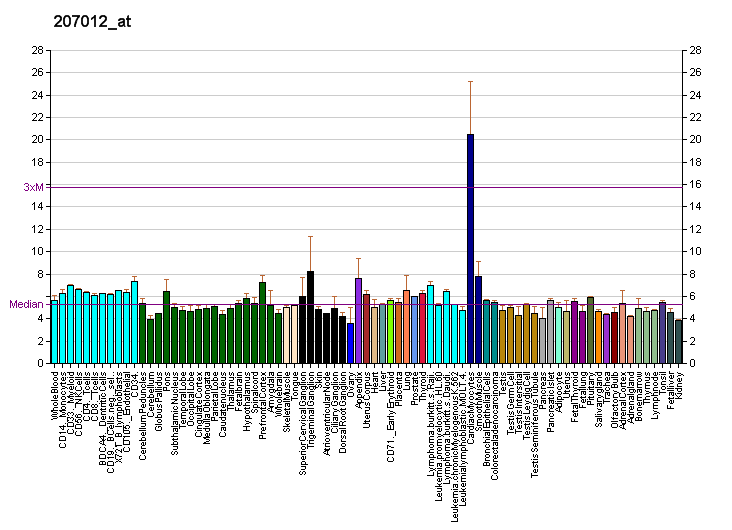

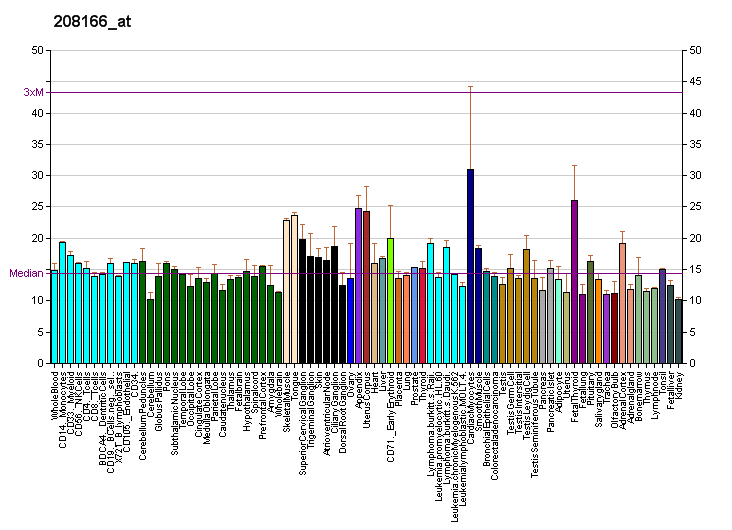
RNA expression pattern
Bgee	Human / Mouse (ortholog); Top expressed in: endothelial cell; tibia; Brodmann area 23; cartilage tissue; postcentral gyrus; middle temporal gyrus; entorhinal cortex; superior frontal gyrus; stromal cell of endometrium; ventricular zone / Top expressed in: calvaria; body wall; rib; body of femur; genital tubercle; umbilical cord; Rostral migratory stream; lumbar subsegment of spinal cord; tail of embryo; pineal gland; More reference expression data
BioGPS	More reference expression data
Gene ontology
Molecular function	metal ion binding; peptidase activity; enzyme activator activity; hydrolase activity; metallopeptidase activity; metalloendopeptidase activity; zinc ion binding; metalloaminopeptidase activity
Cellular component	integral component of membrane; membrane; extracellular matrix; plasma membrane; extracellular region; cell surface; Golgi lumen; integral component of plasma membrane; extracellular space
Biological process	ossification; extracellular matrix disassembly; endochondral ossification; craniofacial suture morphogenesis; chondrocyte proliferation; collagen catabolic process; embryonic cranial skeleton morphogenesis; bone development; positive regulation of catalytic activity; proteolysis; protein processing; protein metabolic process; skeletal system development; extracellular matrix organization
Sources:Amigo / QuickGO
Orthologs
Species	Human	Mouse
Entrez	4325	17389
Ensembl	ENSG00000156103	ENSMUSG00000028226
UniProt	P51512	Q9WTR0
RefSeq (mRNA)	NM_005941; NM_022564; NM_032297	NM_019724; NM_001379518; NM_001379519
RefSeq (protein)	NP_005932	NP_062698; NP_001366447; NP_001366448
Location (UCSC)	Chr 8: 88.03 – 88.33 Mb	Chr 4: 17.85 – 18.12 Mb
PubMed search
- Wikidata
View/Edit Human	View/Edit Mouse

Matrix metalloproteinase-16 is an enzyme that in humans is encoded by the MMP16 gene.

Proteins of the matrix metalloproteinase (MMP) family are involved in the breakdown of extracellular matrix in normal physiological processes, such as embryonic development, reproduction, and tissue remodeling, as well as in disease processes, such as arthritis and metastasis. Most MMP's are secreted as inactive proproteins which are activated when cleaved by extracellular proteinases. This gene produces at least two transcripts, one which encodes a membrane-bound form and another a soluble form of the protein. Both forms of the protein activate MMP2 by cleavage. This gene was once referred to as MT-MMP2, but was renamed as MT-MMP3 or MMP16.
