= CHKB (gene) =

Protein-coding gene in humans

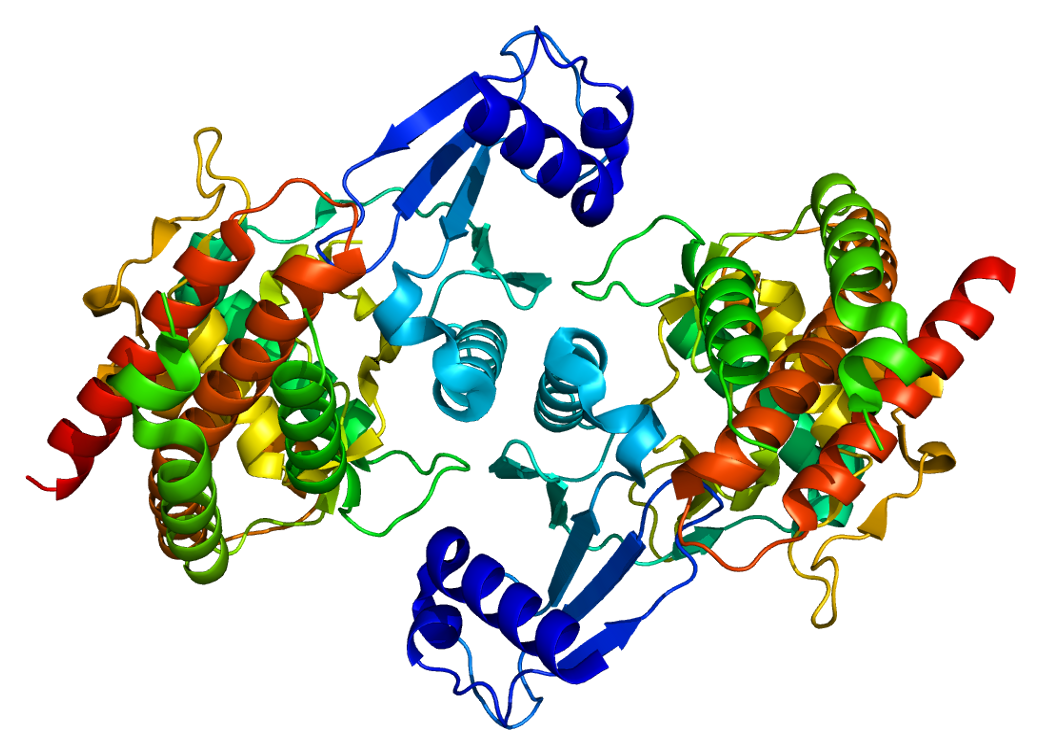

Identifiers
- Aliases: CHKB, CHETK, CHKL, CK, CKB, CKEKB, EK, EKB, MDCMC, choline kinase beta
- External IDs: OMIM: 612395; MGI: 1328313; GeneCards: CHKB
Available structures
PDB	Ortholog search: PDBe RCSB
PDB	List of PDB id codes 3FEG, 2IG7, 3LQ3
Enzyme activity
EC #	BRENDA	ExPASy	KEGG	MetaCyc
2.7.1.32	↗	↗	↗	↗
2.7.1.82	↗	↗	↗	↗

Gene location (Human)
Chr.	Chromosome 22 (human)
Band	22q13.33	Start	50,578,959 bp
Band	22q13.33	End	50,601,455 bp

Gene location (Mouse)
Chr.	Chromosome 15 (mouse)
Band	15|15 E3	Start	89,310,563 bp
Band	15|15 E3	End	89,314,111 bp
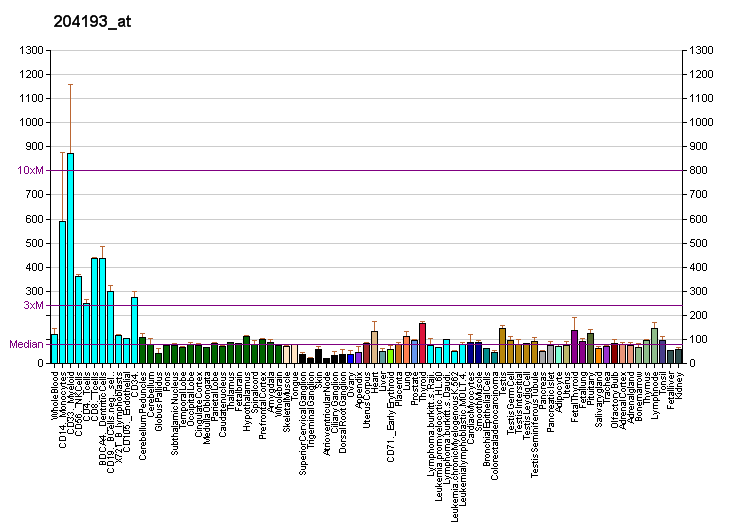
RNA expression pattern
Bgee	Human / Mouse (ortholog); Top expressed in: pituitary gland; granulocyte; anterior pituitary; spleen; right lobe of thyroid gland; left lobe of thyroid gland; right hemisphere of cerebellum; right uterine tube; apex of heart; gastric mucosa / Top expressed in: islet of Langerhans; bone marrow; colon; duodenum; jejunum; granulocyte; spleen; ileum; zone of skin; cerebellar cortex; More reference expression data
BioGPS	More reference expression data
Gene ontology
Molecular function	transferase activity; nucleotide binding; ATP binding; kinase activity; choline kinase activity; ethanolamine kinase activity
Cellular component	cytosol
Biological process	phosphatidylcholine biosynthetic process; phosphatidylethanolamine biosynthetic process; phosphorylation; lipid metabolism; phospholipid biosynthetic process; glycerophospholipid biosynthetic process; CDP-choline pathway
Sources:Amigo / QuickGO
Orthologs
Databases	NCBI: entry; OMA: entry
Species	Human	Mouse
Entrez	1120	12651
Ensembl	ENSG00000100288	ENSMUSG00000022617
UniProt	Q9Y259	O55229
RefSeq (mRNA)	NM_152253; NM_005198	NM_007692
RefSeq (protein)	NP_005189	NP_031718
Location (UCSC)	Chr 22: 50.58 – 50.6 Mb	Chr 15: 89.31 – 89.31 Mb
PubMed search
- Wikidata
View/Edit Human	View/Edit Mouse

Choline kinase beta (CK), also known as ethanolamine kinase (EK), choline kinase-like protein, choline/ethanolamine kinase beta (CKEKB), or choline/ethanolamine kinase, is a protein encoded by the CHKB gene. This gene is found on chromosome 22 in humans. The encoded protein plays a key role in phospholipid biosynthesis. Choline kinase (CK) and ethanolamine kinase (EK) catalyzes the first step in phosphatidylethanolamine biosynthesis. Read-through transcripts are expressed from this locus that include exons from the downstream CPT1B locus.

== Structure ==
The CHKB gene is located on the q arm of chromosome 22 at position 13.3 and it spans 4,041 base pairs. The CHKB gene produces a 7 kDa protein composed of 60 amino acids. The structure of the protein has been found to be a homodimer, and forms a heterodimer with the CHKA protein. It has also been found to contain multiple highly conserved domains, such as a Brenner phosphotransferase consensus sequence essential in catalytic function.

== Function ==
The CHKB gene encodes for a key protein in phospholipid biosynthesis. The choline kinase (CK) and ethanolamine kinase (EK) proteins, which are coded by the CHKB gene, catalyze the phosphorylation of choline/ethanolamine in vitro to phosphocholine/phosphoethanolamine. The catalysis is controlled by ATP in the presence of magnesium and ADP, and commits choline to the enzymatic pathway for biosynthesis of phosphatidylcholine. This is the first step in the biosynthesis of phosphocholine/phosphoethanolamine in all animal cells, and is done by the Kennedy pathway. The highly purified choline kinases from mammalian sources and their recombinant gene products have been shown to have ethanolamine kinase activity as well, indicating that both activities reside on the same protein. However, it has been shown that the protein has higher activity with ethanolamine and may not significantly contribute to in vivo phosphatidylcholine biosynthesis. The choline kinase-like protein encoded by CHKB belongs to the choline/ethanolamine kinase family; however, its exact function is not known. At least two transcript variants encoding two different isoforms have been found for this gene, and one of the transcripts is bicistronic.

== Clinical significance ==
Mutations in CHKB have been found to result in mitochondrial deficiencies and associated disorders. Knockdown of the gene has been known to result in decreased choline kinase and phosphatidylcholine activity. This impairment in activity may lead to a modified composition of the phospholipid composition in the mitochondrial membrane resulting in major disorders in the function and structure of the mitochondria. Major disorders include as Megaconial Congenital Muscular Dystrophy (MDCMC), and Narcolepsy.

=== Megaconial Congenital Muscular Dystrophy (MDCMC) ===
CHKB mutations have been majorly associated with Megaconial Congenital Muscular Dystrophy (MDCMC). Megaconial Congenital Muscular Dystrophy (MDCMC) is an autosomal recessive congenital muscular dystrophy characterized by muscle biopsy results displaying an enlarged mitochondria which are common in the periphery of the fibers but scarce around the center.

Common clinical manifestations of MDCMC include:

- early-onset hypotonia
- muscle wasting
- mildly elevated serum creatine kinase (CK) levels
- severe intellectual disability without brain structural abnormalities
- Gower's sign
- mental retardation
- fatal cardiomyopathy

Symptoms such as neurogenic atrophy, enlarged mitochondria in the periphery of the fibers, and complex I deficiency were shown in a Spanish patient with a homozygous mutation of c.810T>A. Another patient with a homozygous mutation (p.E292X) in the CHKB gene exhibited rhythmic jerkings of arms, which were characterized as muscle spasms. Finally, a patient with a homozygous c.810T>A showed signs of Gower's sign, hypotonia, and proximal muscle weakness.

=== Narcolepsy ===
Narcolepsy is a neurological disabling sleep disorder, characterized by excessive daytime sleepiness, sleep fragmentation, symptoms of abnormal rapid eye movement (REM) sleep, cataplexy, hypnagogic hallucinations, and sleep paralysis. Cataplexy is a sudden loss of muscle tone triggered by emotions, which is the most valuable clinical feature used to diagnose narcolepsy. Human narcolepsy is primarily a sporadically occurring disorder but familial clustering has been observed.

== Interactions ==
CHKB has been shown to have protein–protein interactions with the following.

- ALB
- Human serum albumin
