= CDP-choline pathway =

Phosphatidylcholine biosynthetic process

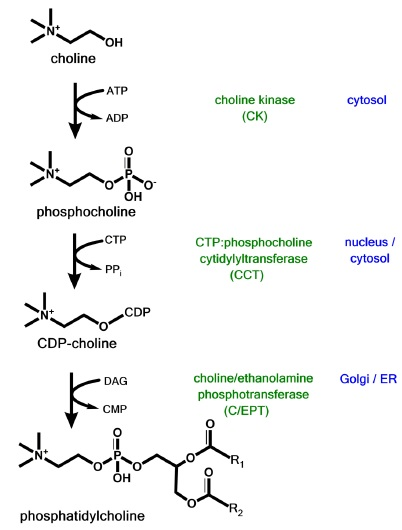
Structures and localization of the enzymes in the CDP-choline pathway.

The CDP-choline pathway, first identified by Eugene P. Kennedy in 1956, is the predominant mechanism by which mammalian cells synthesize phosphatidylcholine (PC) for incorporation into membranes or lipid-derived signalling molecules. The CDP-choline pathway represents one half of what is known as the Kennedy pathway. The other half is the CDP-ethanolamine pathway which is responsible for the biosynthesis of the phospholipid phosphatidylethanolamine (PE).

The CDP-choline pathway begins with the uptake of exogenous choline into the cell. The first enzymatic reaction is catalyzed by choline kinase (CK) and involves the phosphorylation of choline to form phosphocholine. Phosphocholine is then activated by the addition of CTP catalyzed by the rate-limiting enzyme, CTP:phosphocholine cytidylyltransferase to form CDP-choline. The final step of the pathway involves the addition of the choline headgroup onto a diacylglycerol (DAG) backbone to form PC, catalyzed by choline/ethanolamine phosphotransferase (CEPT).

Phosphatidylcholine can be acted upon by phospholipases to form different metabolites.

== Choline transport ==
Mammalian cells are unable to synthesize sufficient quantities of de novo choline to meet physiologic requirements, and therefore must rely on exogenous sources from the diet. The uptake of choline is accomplished predominantly by the high-affinity, sodium-dependent choline transporter (CHT) and requires ATP as an energy source. On the other hand, choline may enter the cell through the activation of low-affinity, sodium-independent organic cation transport proteins (OCTs) and/or carnitine/organic cation transporters (OCTNs), and does not require ATP. Lastly, choline may enter the cell through intermediate-affinity transporters, which include the choline transporter-like protein 1 (CTL1).

The fate of internalized choline depends on the cell type. In pre-synaptic neurons the majority of choline is acetylated by the enzyme choline acetyltransferase to form the neurotransmitter acetylcholine. Most other cells phosphorylate choline by the enzyme choline kinase, the first committed step of CDP-choline pathway.

== Choline kinase (CK) ==
Choline kinase (CK) is a cytosolic protein that catalyzes the following reaction:

- choline + ATP ⇌ phosphocholine + ADP

In addition to the phosphorylation of choline, CK has also been shown to phosphorylate ethanolamine, a precursor to another important glycerophospholipid, phosphatidylethanolamine. CK functions as a dimer consisting of either α1, α2 or β subunits. Each CK isoform is ubiquitously expressed throughout tissues, however CKα is enriched in the testis and liver, whereas CKβ is enriched in the liver and the heart. Homozygous deletion of CKα is embryonic lethal after about 5 days, whereas deletion of CKβ is not.

Under normal circumstances, choline kinase is not the rate-limiting step of the CDP-choline pathway. However in rapidly dividing cells, there is increased CK expression and activity as a result of increased demand for PC synthesis.

== CTP:phosphocholine cytidylyltransferase (CCT) ==
CTP:phosphocholine cytidylyltransferase (CCT), the rate-limiting enzyme of the pathway, is a nuclear/cytosolic enzyme and catalyzes the following reaction:

- phosphocholine + CTP ⇌ CDP-choline + PP_{i}

CCT functions as a dimer of either α and β subunits encoded by Pcyt1a and Pcyt1b, respectively. CCTα has four domains; a Nuclear localization signal (NLS), an α-helical membrane binding domain, a catalytic domain, and a phosphorylation domain. The major difference between the α and β isoforms is that CCTβ lacks the NLS resulting in a predominantly cytosolic pool of CCTβ. On the other hand, the presence of an NLS results in a predominantly nuclear pool of CCTα. CCTα shuttles between the nucleus (where it is considered inactive) and the cytoplasm where it associates with membranes and is activated in response to lipid activators or during progression through the cell cycle when PC demand is high.

CCTα is an amphitropic enzyme, meaning that it exists as either an inactive soluble form, or an active, membrane bound form. Whether or not CCTα is membrane bound is largely dictated by the relative composition of membranes. If membranes are low in PC, and relatively enriched in anionic lipids, diacylglycerol, or phosphatidylethanolamine, CCT inserts into the membrane bilayer via its membrane binding domain. This binding event relieves an autoinhibitory constraint on the catalytic domain, resulting in a decrease in the Km for phosphocholine.

== Choline/ethanolamine phosphotransferase (CEPT) ==
Choline/ethanolamine phosphotransferase (CEPT), or Choline Phosphotransferase (CPT) the last enzymatic reaction in the CDP-choline pathway, catalyzes the following reaction:

- CDP-choline + 1,2-diacylglycerol ⇌ phosphatidylcholine + CMP

The last step in the CDP-choline pathway is catalyzed by either CPT or CEPT and are localized to the Golgi or endoplasmic reticulum, respectively. CPT and CEPT are encoded by separate genes that share 60% sequence similarity. Both isoforms contain 7 transmembrane segments, and an α-helix near the catalytic domain that is required for CDP-alcohol binding.

CPT recognizes only CDP-choline, whereas CEPT recognizes both CDP-choline and CDP-ethanolamine. The reason for this dual specificity is not exclusively known. CEPT is largely considered to be the enzyme responsible for the bulk of PC synthesis, with CPT having an exclusive role in the Golgi, where it may control the levels of the precursor DAG, an important second messenger.

Neither CPT nor CEPT is considered to be rate-limiting, but either can be if DAG is restricted.
