= Mn2+-dependent ADP-ribose/CDP-alcohol diphosphatase =

Class of enzymes

Identifiers
- EC no.: 3.6.1.53

Databases
- BRENDA: enzyme data
- ExPASy: NiceZyme view
- KEGG: enzyme entry
- MetaCyc: metabolic pathway
- Rhea: reactions
- PDB structures: RCSB PDB PDBe PDBsum
Search
- PMC: articles
- PubMed: articles
- NCBI: proteins

Mn^{2+}-dependent ADP-ribose/CDP-alcohol diphosphatase (EC 3.6.1.53, Mn2+-dependent ADP-ribose/CDP-alcohol pyrophosphatase, ADPRibase-Mn) is an enzyme characterised from rats with systematic name CDP-choline phosphohydrolase. It catalyses two related hydrolysis reactions.

In one example, it converts citicoline to cytidine monophosphate and phosphocholine:

citicoline
H_{2}O
cytidine monophosphate
+
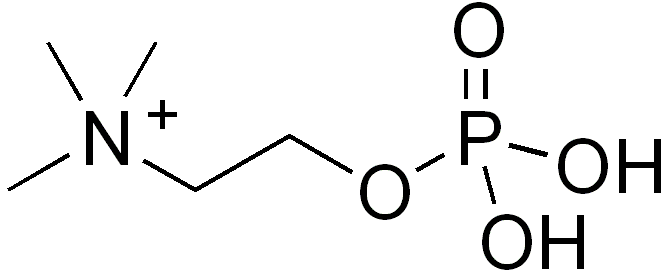
phosphocholine

It can also convert adenosine diphosphate ribose to adenosine monophosphate and ribose 5-phosphate (shown in the D-ribofuranose form):

adenosine diphosphate ribose
H_{2}O
adenosine monophosphate
+
ribose 5-phosphate

The enzyme requires manganese as Mn^{2+}, which cannot be replaced by magnesium ion.
