= Phosphatidylcholine synthase =

Class of enzymes

phosphatidylcholine synthase

Identifiers
- EC no.: 2.7.8.24
- CAS no.: 243666-86-6

Databases
- IntEnz: IntEnz view
- BRENDA: BRENDA entry
- ExPASy: NiceZyme view
- KEGG: KEGG entry
- MetaCyc: metabolic pathway
- PRIAM: profile
- PDB structures: RCSB PDB PDBe PDBsum
- Gene Ontology: AmiGO / QuickGO
Search
- PMC: articles
- PubMed: articles
- NCBI: proteins

In enzymology, a phosphatidylcholine synthase (EC 2.7.8.24) is an enzyme that catalyzes the chemical reaction

CDP-diacylglycerol + choline $\rightleftharpoons$ CMP + phosphatidylcholine

Thus, the two substrates of this enzyme are CDP-diacylglycerol and choline, whereas its two products are CMP and phosphatidylcholine.

This enzyme belongs to the family of transferases, specifically those transferring non-standard substituted phosphate groups. The systematic name of this enzyme class is CDP-diacylglycerol:choline O-phosphatidyltransferase. This enzyme is also called CDP-diglyceride-choline O-phosphatidyltransferase. This enzyme participates in glycerophospholipid metabolism.
