= Choline kinase =

Identifiers
- EC no.: 2.7.1.32
- CAS no.: 9026-67-9

Databases
- IntEnz: IntEnz view
- BRENDA: BRENDA entry
- ExPASy: NiceZyme view
- KEGG: KEGG entry
- MetaCyc: metabolic pathway
- PRIAM: profile
- PDB structures: RCSB PDB PDBe PDBsum
- Gene Ontology: AmiGO / QuickGO
Search
- PMC: articles
- PubMed: articles
- NCBI: proteins

Choline kinase (also known as CK, ChoK and choline phosphokinase) is an enzyme which catalyzes the first reaction in the choline pathway for phosphatidylcholine (PC) biosynthesis. This reaction involves the transfer of a phosphate group from adenosine triphosphate (ATP) to choline, giving phosphocholine:

ATP +
choline
ADP +
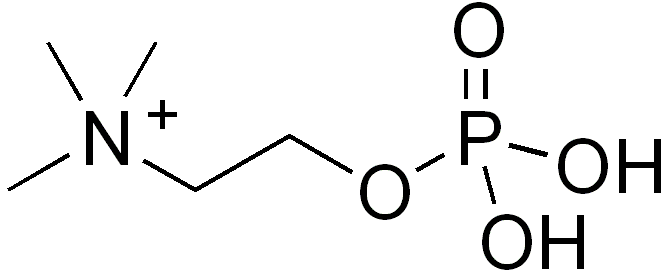
phosphocholine

Choline kinase requires magnesium ions (+2) as a cofactor for this reaction. This enzyme is a transferase, specifically one transferring phosphorus-containing groups (phosphotransferases) with an alcohol group as acceptor. The first detailed investigation of the enzyme was conducted by McCamen in 1962, where it was shown that the brain is the richest source of the enzyme in mammalian tissue. A related enzyme, ethanolamine kinase, tends to co-purify with choline kinase leading to a suggestion that the two activities are mediated by two distinct active sites on a single protein. The systematic name of this enzyme class is ATP:choline phosphotransferase. These enzymes participate in glycine, serine and threonine metabolism and glycerophospholipid metabolism.

In mammalian cells, the enzyme exists as three isoforms: CKα-1, CKα-2 and CKβ. These isoforms are encoded by two separate genes, CHKA and CHKB and are only active in their homodimeric, heterodimeric and oligomeric forms.

== Structural studies ==
As of late 2007, six structures have been solved for this class of enzymes, with PDB accession codes PDB: 1NW1, PDB: 2CKO, PDB: 2CKP, PDB: 2CKQ, PDB: 2I7Q, and PDB: 2IG7.

CKα-2 originating from C. elegans, is a dimeric enzyme with each monomer being composed of two domains. The active site is located between the two domains. Its overall structure is similar to members of the eukaryotic protein kinase family. Mammalian choline kinases exists in either dimeric or tetrameric forms in solution. Structural studies carried out on CKα-2 have implied that the conserved residues in the CK family of enzymes could possibly play a vital role in substrate binding as well as in the stabilization of catalytically important residues.

== Mechanism ==
Suggestions for the mechanism of this enzyme have been made based on studies done on eukaryotic protein kinases. It has been proposed that in the CKα-2 mechanism, ATP binds first, followed by choline, and then the transfer of the phosphoryl group takes place. The product O-phosphocholine is then released, followed by the release of ADP.

== Evolution ==
After studying the structurally similar enzymes, CKα-2, APH(3′)-IIIa, and PKA, researchers observed that PKA had less insertions to its structural core compared to the other enzymes. Against this background, it is believed that CKα-2 have evolved from PKA to have more structural elements attached to it.

== Biological function ==
Choline kinase catalyzes the formation of phosphocholine, the committed step in phosphatidylcholine biosynthesis. Phosphatidylcholine is the major phospholipid in eukaryotic membranes. Phosphatidylcholine is important for a variety of function in eukaryotes such as facilitating the transport of cholesterol through the organism, acting as a substrate for the production of second messengers and as a cofactor for the activity of several membrane-related enzymes. CK also plays a vital role in the production of sphingomyelin, another important membrane phospholipid and in the regulation of cell growth.

The production of phosphocholine from CK is necessary for the signal transduction pathways related to mitogenesis. It has also been found that CK plays a critical role in the proliferation of human mammary epithelial cells.

== Choline kinase α as protein chaperone ==
Choline kinase α can act as a protein chaperone. Kinase can function as chaperone and there may be other kinases that may function as chaperone that are yet to be identified. Choline kinase α (CKα) is overexpressed in prostate cancer where it physically interacts with the androgen receptor (AR), a major driver of prostate cancer. By disabling the function of CHKA researchers were able to inhibit AR function and prostate cancer growth.

In vivo studies carried out using CKα-1 and CKβ isoforms suggest that each isoform might be involved in different biochemical pathways. CKβ plays a major role in the catalysis of the phosphorylation of ethanolamine while CKα-1 catalyzes the phosphorylation of both choline and ethanolamine. ShRNA mediated in vivo depletion of CKα has been shown to decrease the growth of prostate tumor xenografts

== Disease relevance ==
=== Oncogenic activity and CKα-1 ===
Overexpression of CKα-1 has been found to be associated with cancer. Recent studies carried out on cancer cell lines have shown that CKα-1 is over-expressed in breast cancer cells. This leads to an accumulation of phosphocholine in the breast and causes malignancy.

Studies using colon, human lung and prostate carcinomas also revealed that CK is upregulated by overexpression of CKα-1 in these cells compared to the normal, non-cancerous cells.

One possible explanation for this is that CKα-1 aids in the regulation of protein kinase B phosphorylation, particularly at the Serine-473 end. Consequently, high levels of expression and activity of CKα-1 promotes cell growth and survival. Based on the observation that increased activity of CKα-1 is related to cancer, CKα-1 has promising use as a tumor biomarker and in diagnosing and following the progression of tumors. All human cancer cells have shown increased levels of this particular enzyme.

=== Muscular dystrophy and CKβ ===
It has been shown, using CKβ knockout mice models, that a defect in the CKβ activity leads to a decrease in the phosphatidylcholine (PC) content in the hindlimb muscle. This, however, does not affect the phosphoethanolamine (PE) content.

The net effect is then that the PC/PE ratio decreases and this leads to impaired membrane integrity in the liver. This compromised membrane potential leads to malfunctioning of the mitochondria. Although CK is required for the biosynthesis of PC, CK is normally present in excess and so is not generally considered the rate-limiting step. Researchers have concluded, however, that due to the reduced activity of CK seen in the hindlimb muscle of the CKβ knockout mice model, CK is probably the rate-limiting enzyme in skeletal muscles. This suggests that defect in CKβ may lead to a decrease in PC synthesis in the muscles resulting in muscular dystrophy. These results suggest that CK could possibly play a vital role in the homeostasis of PC.
