= Phosphoethanolamine/phosphocholine phosphatase =

Identifiers
- EC no.: 3.1.3.75

Databases
- BRENDA: enzyme data
- ExPASy: NiceZyme view
- KEGG: enzyme entry
- MetaCyc: metabolic pathway
- Rhea: reactions
- PDB structures: RCSB PDB PDBe PDBsum
Search
- PMC: articles
- PubMed: articles
- NCBI: proteins

PHOSPHO1

Identifiers
- Aliases: PHOSPHO1, phosphoethanolamine/phosphocholine phosphatase, phosphoethanolamine/phosphocholine phosphatase 1
- External IDs: MGI: 2447348; GeneCards: PHOSPHO1
Enzyme activity
EC #	BRENDA	ExPASy	KEGG	MetaCyc
3.1.3.75	↗	↗	↗	↗

Gene location (Human)
Chr.	Chromosome 17 (human)
Band	17q21.32	Start	49,223,366 bp
Band	17q21.32	End	49,230,787 bp

Gene location (Mouse)
Chr.	Chromosome 11 (mouse)
Band	11 D|11 59.01 cM	Start	95,715,325 bp
Band	11 D|11 59.01 cM	End	95,722,966 bp
RNA expression pattern
Bgee	Human / Mouse (ortholog); Top expressed in: testicle; left testis; right testis; granulocyte; blood; monocyte; gonad; spleen; muscle of thigh; bone marrow cell / Top expressed in: muscle of thigh; skeletal muscle tissue; granulocyte; quadriceps femoris muscle; bone marrow; esophagus; lateral part of occipital bone; lip; cerebellar cortex; zone of skin; More reference expression data
BioGPS	n/a
Gene ontology
Molecular function	phosphatase activity; phosphoethanolamine phosphatase activity; pyrophosphatase activity; phosphocholine phosphatase activity; hydrolase activity; metal ion binding
Cellular component	cytosol; extracellular membrane-bounded organelle; extracellular matrix
Biological process	phosphatidylcholine biosynthetic process; bone mineralization involved in bone maturation; endochondral ossification; phosphatidylethanolamine biosynthetic process; regulation of bone mineralization; dephosphorylation
Sources:Amigo / QuickGO
Orthologs
Databases	NCBI: entry; OMA: entry
Species	Human	Mouse
Entrez	162466	237928
Ensembl	ENSG00000173868	ENSMUSG00000050860
UniProt	Q8TCT1	Q8R2H9
RefSeq (mRNA)	NM_001143804; NM_178500	NM_153104
RefSeq (protein)	NP_001137276; NP_848595	NP_694744
Location (UCSC)	Chr 17: 49.22 – 49.23 Mb	Chr 11: 95.72 – 95.72 Mb
PubMed search
- Wikidata
View/Edit Human	View/Edit Mouse

Phosphoethanolamine/phosphocholine phosphatase (EC 3.1.3.75, PHOSPHO1, 3X11A; systematic name phosphoethanolamine phosphohydrolase) is an enzyme highly expressed in mineralizing cells . This enzyme is implicated in bone and cartilage formation and catalyses the following two chemical reactions:

phosphorylethanolamine
H_{2}O
P_{i}
ethanolamine
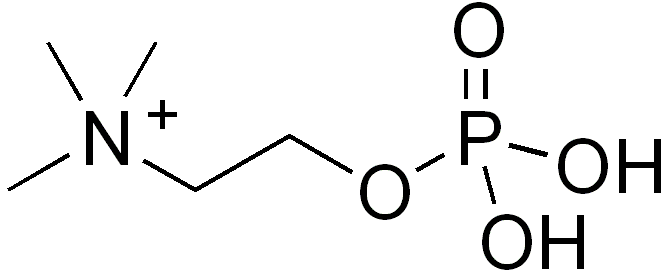
phosphocholine
H_{2}O
P_{i}
choline

In each case, a phosphate group is removed by hydrolysis, giving orthophosphate (P_{i}) as a byproduct. The enzyme is specific for phosphorylethanolamine and phosphocholine.

The enzyme is a member of the haloacid dehalogenase superfamily. Like other members of this superfamily it requires a metal ion for catalysis, which is usually Mg^{2+}, it is also active in the presence of Co^{2+} or Mn^{2+} but exhibits a lower specific activity with these metal ions.
