= Théodore Nicolas Gobley =

Théodore Gobley
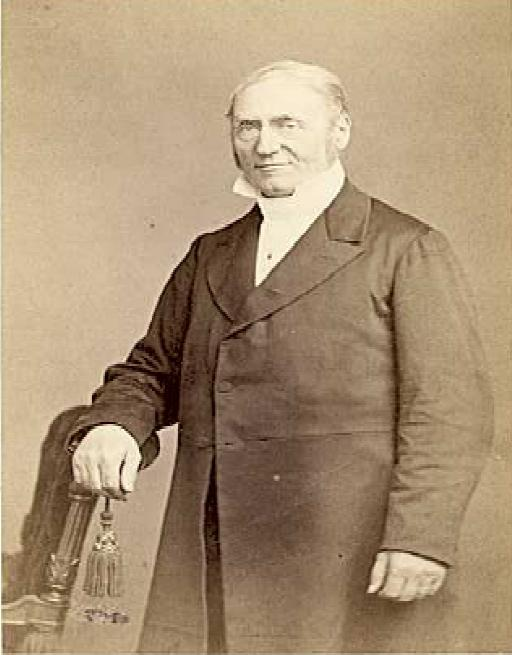
- Photo taken around 1860
- Born: 11 May 1811; Paris, France
- Died: 1 September 1876 (aged 65); Bagnères de Luchon, France
- Occupations: Pharmacist, biochemist

Théodore (Nicolas) Gobley (French: [ɡɔblɛ]; 11 May 1811 in Paris – 1 September 1876 in Bagnères-de-Luchon), was the first to isolate and ultimately determine the chemical structure of lecithin, the first identified and characterized member of the phospholipids class. He was also a pioneer researcher in the study and analysis of the chemical components of brain tissues.

== Biography and academic courses ==
Gobley's family originated from the small city Fulvy in the Yonne region, a very rural hilly area of Burgundy. His father had settled at the end of the 18th century as a wine broker in Paris, marrying a young lady in a family long established (since at least the beginning of the 17th century) in that trade in the capital city of France. That family, Boutron, was registered in the 17th and 18th centuries as one of the 12 suppliers of wines to the King's Court.

Wine trading had strong links with alcoholic distillation, some close kin of the Boutron family were indeed spirits distillers, and it is likely this environment that led Gobley to studies in chemistry and pharmacy.

Indeed, an historical study conducted in 1957 by P. et C. Chatagnon on the early steps of brain tissues chemical structure studies mentions that Gobley effected a stay as apprentice by one of his parents named Guerin, indicated as pharmacist (actually, his brother-in-law, Denis Guerin (1798–1888), pharmacist in Paris for a few years in the early 1830s, but more well known as mayor of the city of Fontainebleau during close to 30 years, from 1843 till 1871, and so far as known, not related to the Boutron family).

Whatever the initial lead, further on Gobley entered full grade studies in pharmacy and in the early 1830s attended courses delivered by one of the great figures of French pharmaceutical and chemistry arts of that time, Pierre Jean Robiquet, of whom he became a close collaborator, and ultimately his son-in-law, through marrying Laure Robiquet, one of the daughters of his master and mentor.

Gobley qualified as a pharmacist in 1835, married Laure Robiquet in 1837, and established himself as pharmacist in Paris (60 rue du Bac; the place had been run down when Boulevard Saint Germain was opened some 30 years later); in parallel to his trade, in his personal lab he conducted his research, and followed a path very similar to that of his father-in–law (demised in 1840): he entered the Ecole de Pharmacie as professor in 1842 (he quit in 1847), became a member of the Académie Nationale de Pharmacie in 1843, of which he became president in 1861, and was admitted as a member of the Académie de Médecine that same year.

While conducting various works on a diversified range of topics much like most pharmacists/chemists (interchangeable at the time) of the 19th century, Gobley pursued a lifelong study of lipids in living animals, whereby he demonstrated the universal presence of a fundamental substance, which he named lecithin, and the exact composition of lecithin over the course of thirty years.

Gobley was also a philanthropist, and he was involved in the management of a local administration office for the housing of poorer people in the "Département de la Seine" (today, the greater Paris area including districts 75, 78, 91, 92, 93, 94, 95).

One of Gobley's daughters married composer Paul Collin. Gobley died on 1 September 1876 in the Pyrenean thermal resort of "Bagnères-de-Luchon, where he was on a family trip. His burial place lies at "cimetière Montparnasse" in southern Paris.

== Discoverer of lecithin and phospholipids ==
In the course of the first half of the 19th century, several French chemists had initiated some tries at the chemical components of brain tissues, but tools and methods for analysis were poor and results fairly unsatisfactory; however they had consistently obtained through different methods, mostly through dissolution in warm alcohol of brain matter, a lipidic substance of more or less stable composition which they had diversely called "matière blanche" (Louis-Nicolas Vauquelin), "cérébrote" (J. P. Couërbe), acide cérébrique (Edmond Frémy).

Obviously, the brain tissues were not solely composed of that, and confusion was high as to their actual composition, with especially Edmond Fremy holding, based on his work on "acide cerebrique", for a blend of neutral lipids such as olein and phosphoric acid.

Gobley found a masterly solution to this question in a series of careful incremental steps. Building on a succession of biological tissue models : egg yolk (1846–1847), carp fish eggs (1850), carp fish roe (1850), brain matter of sundry higher class vertebrae such as chicken, and ultimately man, fat matters in human fluids: blood (1852), bile (1856), Gobley, in a series of works assiduously pursued over a span of more than 30 years, classified the several fat matters from a variety of biological tissues, characterized their several properties, identified their respective structure, established bridges between wide apart categories (seminal matter, brain) and branches of zoology (birds, fish, mammals), shed light on similarities of tissues build-up and specified their differences depending on their function (1874).

=== Early studies on egg yolk chemical components, 1843–1847 ===
In a first step during 1845 ("Recherches chimiques sur le jaune d'œuf", Compte Rendu hebdomadaire Académie des Sciences 1845, 21, 766) Gobley achieved a ground breaking first work where he analysed in detail the lipids in the egg yolk, obtaining from egg yolk byproducts never before evidenced in that matter:

- margaric acid, for which he confirmed the chemical breakdown obtained by Mr Varentrapp, at the expense of the variant sustained by Michel Eugène Chevreul
- oleic acid, for which he confirmed the chemical breakdown obtained by Mr Michel Eugène Chevreul
- an acid containing phosphorus, that a very careful and delicate series of analyses led him to indisputably identify as glycerophosphoric acid

While evidencing the first two could somehow be looked at with some more or less natural expectation, given their prevailing presence previously demonstrated in a variety of organs or corporeal fluids (such as blood, bile, brain tissues), the latter one was until then exclusively known as a byproduct of direct chemical preparation.

Gobley in addition brought full details as to the constitution of the oily part of egg yolk, which he determined to be made up of oleine, margarine and a cholesterin, previously evidenced by Louis-René Le Canu and which he demonstrated has entirely identical properties to the one (cholesterol) isolated from bile by Michel Eugène Chevreul.

In the immediate wake, in a second step in 1847 ("Recherches chimiques sur le jaune d'oeuf de poule"; par M. Gobley. Deuxième Mémoire. Comptes Rendus hebdomadaires Académie des Sciences 1847, 21, 988) Gobley took a global view of the chemical structure of egg yolk and proposed for its lipid part a model comprising two distinct fractions:

- the one, in very small quantities (0.3% of total mass) which he qualified as a nitrogenous fraction totally devoid of phosphor, and which he hinted to be quite probably identical with the higher up mentioned "matière blanche" Louis-Nicolas Vauquelin, "cérébrote" (J.P.Couërbe), and "acide cérébrique" (Edmond Frémy), identified and described from early 19th century years; for this fraction Gobley used the denomination of "matière cérébrique" ("Recherches chimiques sur le jaune d'œuf 2ème mémoire"), then later on the name "cérébrine" ("Recherches chimiques sur les œufs de carpe"); this name "cerebrin" had been created some years before by a German chemist Müller, while fully characterizing its chemical composition and properties;
- the other, in significant quantities (8.5% of total mass) which he qualified and characterized as definitely containing phosphor under some form, that he prosaically denominated "matière phosphorée" ("phosphoric matter") ("Recherches chimiques sur le jaune d'œuf 2ème mémoire"); this fraction can be degraded into a mixture of margaric acid, oleic acid and glycerophosphoric acid, for the which it is the sole and exclusive origin, Gobley effectively demonstrated that none of these three acids exists on its own within egg yolk.

=== Bringing to light the chemical bridges from egg yolk to human brain, 1847 ===
In this very same work, Gobley developed an awareness that this phosphoric part was a new, non-characterized and complex component of a precise nature and stable structure, not a mixture of sub-products in varying proportions:

If therefore neither one of oleic acid, margaric acid nor glycerophosphoric acid existed as such in the viscous matter (of egg yolk), what kind of a (molecule) can that be (that is their source), that indisputably presents one of the most unusual set of properties within all the (fractions) of biological tissues

Mais si les acides oléïque, margarique et phosphoglycérique ne préexistent pas dans la matière visqueuse, quelle est donc la nature de ce corps, qui est sans contredit l'un des plus curieux de l'organisation animale?

Having recognized the uniqueness of this component from this work in 1847, Gobley henceforth bore most of his research efforts on it.

Already in this same year of 1847, Gobley realized the deep similarities of chemical structure between brain tissues and egg yolk.

Taking up the previous work of Vauquelin, Couërbe and Frémy, he isolated as they had from the fat matters of animal brain as well as from the human brain a phosphoric fraction, but going one step further, he demonstrated that this brain matter yields through hydrolysis exactly the same set of by-products that he had obtained from egg yolk: ever the triad oleic acid, margaric acid, glycerophosphoric acid (Journal de Pharmacie et de Chimie 1847, 12, 5).

I have rerun all those experiments using the phosphoric viscous matter from the brain of chicken, of sheep, and finally of man, and ever I am come to the same results. There then exists in the brain, just as in egg yolk, a phosphoric substance which, under the conditions I exercised unto it, has always yielded as decomposition products oleic acid, margaric acid and glycerophosphoric acid.

J'ai répété toutes ces expériences avec la matière visqueuse phosphorée de la cervelle du poulet, du mouton et de l'homme, et je suis arrivé aux mêmes résultats. Il existe donc dans le cerveau, comme dans le jaune d'oeuf, une substance phosphorée qui, dans les conditions où je l'ai placée, m'a toujours donné, pour produits de décomposition, de l'acide oléique, de l'acide margarique et de l'acide phosphoglycérique.

This set of solid results led him into proposing for cerebral tissues a chemical structure parallel to that of egg yolk, relying on a phosphoric part, lecithin, and a non-phosphoric, nitrogenous part, cerebrin ("Recherches chimiques sur les oeufs de carpe". Journal de Pharmacie et de Chimie 1850, t17, 401, et t18, 107). This approach set him immediately at odds with the views developed up to then by Edmond Frémy, the prominent specialist of that period regarding the chemical study of the brain and a member of the Académie des Sciences; Frémy's views were that the phosphoric fraction of brain was related to the phospho-oleic acid.

Another twenty years were employed by Gobley to fully demonstrate the point.

=== The identification and chemical breakdown of lecithin, the first of phospholipids, 1848–1874 ===
In the course of the next three years 1848–1850, Gobley extended the scope of his research in parallel over egg yolk, carp fish eggs, fish roe, and brain tissue.

In 1850 ("Recherches chimiques sur les œufs de carpe"), he evidenced the presence of his "matière phosphorée", with identical properties, in carp fish eggs; he proposed for it the name of lecithin which history upheld, from the Greek lekithos (egg yolk) (Journal de Pharmacie et de Chimie, Paris, 1850, 17, 401), thus underlining the clear link with his early studies.

And in its wake he demonstrated that lecithin, however obtained (from egg yolk, carp fish eggs, fish roe, human brain), and even though not totally purified, always yields a mix of oleic acid, margaric acid and glycerophosphoric acid when hydrolyzed, and under no circumstances whatsoever anything like phosphoric acid which would have been expected if ordinary fat matter acids, such as phospho-oleic acid, had been involved ("Recherches chimiques sur la laitance de carpe." Journal de Pharmacie et de Chimie 1851, t19, 406).

Conversely, he demonstrated that the non phosphoric fraction of egg yolk, that he had called "cérébrine" is absolutely identical in chemical breakdown and reactive properties to the "acide cérébrique" identified by Edmond Frémy and M. R. D. Thompson in the brain.

In 1852, he evidenced the presence of lecithin in veinous blood (Recherches chimiques sur les matières grasses du sang veineux de l'homme), and in 1856, in bile as well (Recherches sur la nature chimique et les propriétés des matières grasses contenues dans la bile).

However, he still lacked one brick for a complete breakdown of lecithin's structure.

That brick was found during the 1860s by parallel work conducted mainly in Germany, that identified yet a new component of biological fat matters, choline, first in the liver-produced bile by the German chemist Adolph Strecker (Ann. Chem. Pharm. 1868, 148, 77), then shortly afterward in the human brain through the research of Oscar Liebreich in Berlin (who believing he had identified a different matter named it initially "nevrin") and in his wake complementary contributions by Dibkowsky, Baeyer and Wurtz.

Using these additions to his own work, Gobley in 1874 crowned this long, patient and unyielding series of steps through a final proposal of a complete structure for lecithin, whose hydrolysis yields exactly one oleic acid, one margaric acid, one glycerophosphoric acid and one choline ("Sur la lécithine et la cérébrine", Gobley J Pharm Chim 1874, 19, 346).

Fig 1. 1 example of variant phosphatidylcholine, palmitoyl-oleyl-sn-phosphatidylcholine.

Later studies expanded the egg yolk lecithin into a wide family of lecithins answering to this structure, combining with a choline head and glycerophosphoric acid a variety of fatty acids. In general, a lecithin, or more precisely a phosphatidylcholine is obtained using a saturated fatty acid, in the example here palmitic acid or hexadecanoic acid H_{3}C-(CH_{2})_{14}-COOH (margaric acid identified by Gobley in egg yolk, now named heptadecanoïc acid H_{3}C-(CH_{2})_{15}-COOH, belongs to that class) and an unsaturated fatty acid, here oleic acid or 9Z-octadecenoic acid as in Gobley's original egg yolk lecithin).

=== The first global overview of brain tissues chemical structure ===
The complete series of results led Gobley into proposing for brain viscous matter a structure under four main components ("Recherches chimiques sur le cerveau de l'homme", Journal de Pharmacie et de Chimie 1874) (water set aside, an overwhelming 80%):

- lecithin (5.5%),
- cerebrin (approximately 3%), characterized as a nitrogenous matter, identical to that of egg yolk, but in much higher quantities in the brain
- cholesterin (approximately 1%),
- and an abundant new component of albuminous type, that he named cephalin (approximately 7%), in addition to regular albumin (1%)

Gobley thus was the discoverer of the new class of phospholipids and a pioneer in the understanding of the chemical basis of brain structure and build-up.

== Other research, investigations and discoveries ==
In parallel, Gobley developed a number of additional threads of research of a more mainstream type:

In cooperation with a French doctor, member of the Academie de Medecine, Jean-Léonard-Marie Poiseuille, he published some results on urea in blood and urine.

In liaison with his commitment in public health matters and institutions, he involved himself in various studies on toxics, human nutrition and health, and the safety of industrial processes: thus he successively investigated toxins in toadstools (Recherches chimiques sur les champignons vénéneux, 1856), medicinal real or supposed properties of diverse plants, herbs and preparations, toxicity of lead in widespread tins used for cooking utensils, poisonous effects of rye.

In the tradition of the methods of Robiquet, from the natural vanilla fruit, he obtained in 1858 the pure vanillin, the active flavoring principle. Gobley lived to see this breakthrough bring about the advent of artificial industrial vanillin synthesis, in a process based on glycosides extracted from the sap of pine trees (1874). This opened the path to the expansion of the use of that very popular flavour. Incidentally that also brought about the complete collapse of the growing of natural vanilla and the related industry, but that may have not been intended by Gobley.

== Publications ==
- "Sur l'existence des acides oléique, margarique et phosphoglycérique dans le jaune d'oeuf. Premier Mémoire: Sur la composition chimique du jaune d'oeuf"; par M. Gobley. (Extrait). C R hebd Acad Sci 1845, 11, 8

66

- "Recherches chimiques sur le jaune d'oeuf de poule"; par M. Gobley. Deuxième Mémoire. C R hebd Acad Sci 1845, 21, 988
- "Recherches chimiques sur le jaune d'oeuf - Examen comparatif du jaune d'oeuf et de la matière cérébrale". Journal de Pharmacie et de Chimie 1847, t11, 409 et 412
- "Recherches chimiques sur les oeufs de carpe". Journal de Pharmacie et de Chimie 1850, t17, 401, et t18, 107
- "Recherches chimiques sur la laitance de carpe". Journal de Pharmacie et de Chimie 1851, t19, 406
- "Recherches chimiques sur la matière grasse du sang veineux de l'homme". Journal de Pharmacie et de Chimie 1852, t21, 241
- "Recherches sur la nature chimique et les propriétés des matières grasses contenues dans la bile". Journal de Pharmacie et de Chimie 1856, t30, 241
- "Recherches chimiques sur le cerveau; par M. Gobley". Journal de Pharmacie et de Chimie 1874,4ème série, t19, p. 346–354
- "Sur la lécithine et la cérébrine"; par M. Gobley". Journal de Pharmacie et de Chimie 1874, t20, 98–103, 161–166
- "Note sur l'Elaïomètre, nouvel instrument d'essai pour les huiles d'olive". M. Gobley. J Pharm Chim 1843, 4, 285
- "Recherches sur la nature chimique et les propriétés des matières grasses contenues dans la bile", par M. Gobley. Journal de Pharmacie et de Chimie, 1856
- "Recherches physiologiques sur l'urée (avec Mr le docteur Poiseuille)", par M. Gobley. Comptes rendus de l'Académie des Sciences et Gazette hebdomadaire de médecine et de chirurgie, 1859
- "Recherche sur le principe odorant de la vanille", par M.Gobley. Journal de Pharmacie et de Chimie 1858

== See also ==
- Pierre Jean Robiquet
- Eugène Chevreul
- Louis-Nicolas Vauquelin
- Théophile-Jules Pelouze
- Edmond Frémy
- Oscar Liebreich
- Jean Léonard Marie Poiseuille
- Strecker amino acid synthesis
