= Choline/ethanolamine kinase family =

Choline_kinase
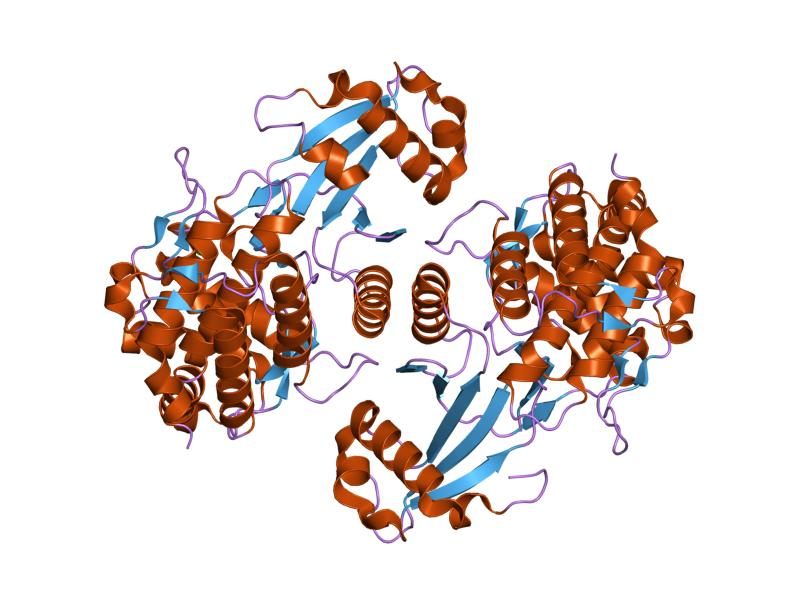
- crystal structure of choline kinase

Identifiers
- Symbol: Choline_kinase
- Pfam: PF01633
- Pfam clan: CL0016
- InterPro: IPR002573
Available protein structures:
- PDB: IPR002573 PF01633 (ECOD; PDBsum)
- AlphaFold: IPR002573; PF01633

In molecular biology, the choline/ethanolamine kinase family includes choline kinase(EC 2.7.1.32) and ethanolamine kinase (EC 2.7.1.82).

Ethanolamine and choline are major membrane phospholipids, in the form of glycerophosphoethanolamine and glycerophosphocholine. Ethanolamine is also a component of the glycosylphosphatidylinositol (GPI) anchor, which is necessary for cell-surface protein attachment. The de novo synthesis of these phospholipids begins with the creation of phosphoethanolamine and phosphocholine by ethanolamine and choline kinases in the first step of the CDP-ethanolamine pathway. There are two putative choline/ethanolamine kinases (C/EKs) in the Trypanosoma brucei genome.

Ethanolamine kinase has no choline kinase activity and its activity is inhibited by ADP. Inositol supplementation represses ethanolamine kinase, decreasing the incorporation of ethanolamine into the CDP-ethanolamine pathway and into phosphatidylethanolamine and phosphatidylcholine.
