= Alpha-N-acetylneuraminate alpha-2,8-sialyltransferase =

Class of enzymes

alpha-N-acetylneuraminate alpha-2,8-sialyltransferase

Identifiers
- EC no.: 2.4.99.8
- CAS no.: 67339-00-8

Databases
- IntEnz: IntEnz view
- BRENDA: BRENDA entry
- ExPASy: NiceZyme view
- KEGG: KEGG entry
- MetaCyc: metabolic pathway
- PRIAM: profile
- PDB structures: RCSB PDB PDBe PDBsum
- Gene Ontology: AmiGO / QuickGO
Search
- PMC: articles
- PubMed: articles
- NCBI: proteins

In enzymology, an alpha-N-acetylneuraminate alpha-2,8-sialyltransferase (EC 2.4.99.8) is an enzyme that catalyzes the chemical reaction

CMP-N-acetylneuraminate + alpha-N-acetylneuraminyl-2,3-beta-D-galactosyl-R $\rightleftharpoons$ CMP + alpha-N-acetylneuraminyl-2,8-alpha-N-acetylneuraminyl-2,3-beta-D- galactosyl-R

Thus, the two substrates of this enzyme are CMP-N-acetylneuraminate and alpha-N-acetylneuraminyl-2,3-beta-D-galactosyl-R, whereas its 3 products are CMP, alpha-N-acetylneuraminyl-2,8-alpha-N-acetylneuraminyl-2,3-beta-D-, and galactosyl-R. This enzyme participates in 4 metabolic pathways: glycosphingolipid biosynthesis - neo-lactoseries, glycosphingolipid biosynthesis - globoseries, glycosphingolipid biosynthesis - ganglioseries, and glycan structures - biosynthesis 2.

This enzyme belongs to the family of transferases, specifically those glycosyltransferases that do not transfer hexosyl or pentosyl groups. The systematic name of this enzyme class is CMP-N-acetylneuraminate:alpha-N-acetylneuraminyl-2,3-beta-D-galactos ide alpha-2,8-N-acetylneuraminyltransferase. Other names in common use include cytidine monophosphoacetylneuraminate-ganglioside GM3, alpha-2,8-sialyltransferase, ganglioside GD3 synthase, ganglioside GD3 synthetase sialyltransferase, CMP-NeuAc:LM1(alpha2-8) sialyltransferase, GD3 synthase, and SAT-2.
