= Lysophosphatidylethanolamine =

Chemical Compound

A lysophosphatidylethanolamine (LPE) is a chemical compound derived from a phosphatidylethanolamine, which is typical of cell membranes. LPE results from partial hydrolysis of phosphatidylethanolamine, which removes one of the fatty acid groups. The hydrolysis is generally the result of the enzymatic action of phospholipase A2. LPE can be used in agricultural use to regulate plant growth such as color increase, sugar content increase, plant health increase, and storability increase without side effect.

LPE is present as a minor phospholipid in the cell membrane. Actually, LPE was detected in human serum, and its level is reported to be about several hundred ng mL^{−1}. Available sources of LPE are egg yolk lecithin (≤1.5%), soybean lecithin (≤0.2%), and other lecithins.

== Function ==
Lysophosphatidylethanolamine (LPE also, lisophos ) is a minor constituent of cell membranes(natural compound). LPE plays a role in cell-mediated cell signaling and activation of other enzymes. The physiological significance of the plasma LPE remains unknown. However, LPE has antifungal and antibacterial activity in the housefly, and in certain mushrooms, it stimulates the MAPK cascade.

Previous studies showed that LPE, a natural phospholipid, can accelerate ripening and prolong shelf life of tomato fruit, and retard senescence in attached and detached leaves and fruit of tomato. In other studies, LPE inhibited the activity of phospholipase D (PLD), a membrane degrading enzyme, of which active is increased during senescence. More recently, it is reported that LPE can also accelerate color development and promote shelf life of cranberries, and increase fruit qualities of Thompson seedless grapes, in such as soluble solids content (SSC), titratable acidity (TA), firmness, and size. Along with these results show that LPE can accelerate ripening of fruit and also, have potential to protect senescence.

== Structure and chemistry ==
General chemical structure of lysophosphatidylethanolamine, where R is a variable fatty acid chain

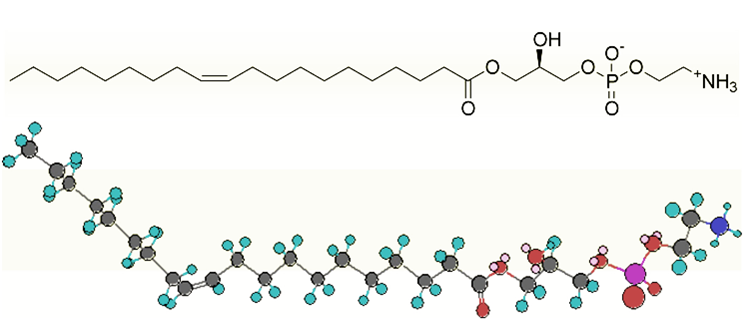
Example of lysophosphatidylethanolamine, (1-Oleyl) Lysophosphatidylethanolamine

Lysophosphatidylethanolamine (LPE) is composed of an ethanolamine head group and glycerophosphoric acid with a various fatty acid located sn-1 position. The fatty acid may be saturated or unsaturated acyl.

- Chemical name: 1-Acyl-sn-glycero-3-phospho(2-aminoethanol)
- CAS number: 95046-40-5
- Molecular weight: ≅479

== Uses ==
Lysophosphatidylethanolamine (LPE) is a minor membrane glycerolipid; however, it has been reported that it has useful physiological effects on fruit and vegetable crops. LPE was approved by the United States Environmental Protection Agency for use on agricultural crops. It is used with tomatoes, peppers, grapes, cranberry, and oranges for increasing color, sugar contents and their storage life. In addition, it is reported that LPE can delay senescence in leaves and fruits, and mitigate stress of ethylene-induced process.

SignaFresh, the brand name made of LPE, is helpful for crops to be valuable product. Preharvest application of SignaFresh leads ideal postharvest behaviors.

== See also ==
- Phospholipid
- Phospholipase A2
- Phospholipase D
- Phenylalanine ammonia lyase (PAL)
- Acid invertase (Ac INV)
