= Ethanolamine-phosphate phospho-lyase =

ethanolamine-phosphate phospho-lyase

Identifiers
- EC no.: 4.2.3.2
- CAS no.: 37290-88-3

Databases
- IntEnz: IntEnz view
- BRENDA: BRENDA entry
- ExPASy: NiceZyme view
- KEGG: KEGG entry
- MetaCyc: metabolic pathway
- PRIAM: profile
- PDB structures: RCSB PDB PDBe PDBsum
- Gene Ontology: AmiGO / QuickGO
Search
- PMC: articles
- PubMed: articles
- NCBI: proteins

The enzyme ethanolamine-phosphate phospho-lyase (EC 4.2.3.2) catalyzes the chemical reaction

ethanolamine phosphate + H_{2}O $\rightleftharpoons$ acetaldehyde + NH_{3} + phosphate

This enzyme belongs to the family of lyases, specifically those carbon-oxygen lyases acting on phosphates. The systematic name of this enzyme class is ethanolamine-phosphate phosphate-lyase (deaminating; acetaldehyde-forming). Other names in common use include O-phosphoethanolamine-phospholyase, amino alcohol O-phosphate phospholyase, O-phosphorylethanol-amine phospho-lyase, and ethanolamine-phosphate phospho-lyase (deaminating). It employs one cofactor, pyridoxal phosphate.
