= CDP-diacylglycerol diphosphatase =

Enzyme

Identifiers
- EC no.: 3.6.1.26
- CAS no.: 62213-20-1

Databases
- IntEnz: IntEnz view
- BRENDA: BRENDA entry
- ExPASy: NiceZyme view
- KEGG: KEGG entry
- MetaCyc: metabolic pathway
- PRIAM: profile
- PDB structures: RCSB PDB PDBe PDBsum
- Gene Ontology: AmiGO / QuickGO
Search
- PMC: articles
- PubMed: articles
- NCBI: proteins

In enzymology, a CDP-diacylglycerol diphosphatase (EC 3.6.1.26) is an enzyme that catalyzes the chemical reaction

CDP-diacylglycerol + H_{2}O $\rightleftharpoons$ CMP + phosphatidate

Thus, the two substrates of this enzyme are CDP-diacylglycerol and H_{2}O, whereas its two products are CMP and phosphatidate.

This enzyme belongs to the family of hydrolases, specifically those acting on acid anhydrides in phosphorus-containing anhydrides. The systematic name of this enzyme class is CDP-diacylglycerol phosphatidylhydrolase. Other names in common use include cytidine diphosphodiacylglycerol pyrophosphatase, and CDP diacylglycerol hydrolase. This enzyme participates in glycerophospholipid metabolism.

== Structural studies ==
As of late 2007, only one structure has been solved for this class of enzymes, with the PDB accession code 2POF.
