= Galactosyldiacylglycerol alpha-2,3-sialyltransferase =

Class of enzymes

galactosyldiacylglycerol alpha-2,3-sialyltransferase

Identifiers
- EC no.: 2.4.99.5
- CAS no.: 80237-98-5

Databases
- IntEnz: IntEnz view
- BRENDA: BRENDA entry
- ExPASy: NiceZyme view
- KEGG: KEGG entry
- MetaCyc: metabolic pathway
- PRIAM: profile
- PDB structures: RCSB PDB PDBe PDBsum
- Gene Ontology: AmiGO / QuickGO
Search
- PMC: articles
- PubMed: articles
- NCBI: proteins

In enzymology, a galactosyldiacylglycerol alpha-2,3-sialyltransferase (EC 2.4.99.5) is an enzyme that catalyzes the chemical reaction

CMP-N-acetylneuraminate + 1,2-diacyl-3-beta-D-galactosyl-sn-glycerol $\rightleftharpoons$ CMP + 1,2-diacyl-3-[3-(alpha-D-N-acetylneuraminyl)-beta-D-galactosyl]-sn- glycerol

Thus, the two substrates of this enzyme are CMP-N-acetylneuraminate and 1,2-diacyl-3-beta-D-galactosyl-sn-glycerol, whereas its 3 products are CMP, [[1,2-diacyl-3-[3-(alpha-D-N-acetylneuraminyl)-beta-D-galactosyl]-sn-]], and glycerol.

This enzyme belongs to the family of transferases, specifically those glycosyltransferases that do not transfer hexosyl or pentosyl groups. The systematic name of this enzyme class is CMP-N-acetylneuraminate:1,2-diacyl-3-beta-D-galactosyl-sn-glycerol N-acetylneuraminyltransferase. This enzyme participates in glycerolipid metabolism.
