= CDP-ribitol ribitolphosphotransferase =

Enzyme

Identifiers
- EC no.: 2.7.8.14
- CAS no.: 9076-71-5

Databases
- IntEnz: IntEnz view
- BRENDA: BRENDA entry
- ExPASy: NiceZyme view
- KEGG: KEGG entry
- MetaCyc: metabolic pathway
- PRIAM: profile
- PDB structures: RCSB PDB PDBe PDBsum
- Gene Ontology: AmiGO / QuickGO
Search
- PMC: articles
- PubMed: articles
- NCBI: proteins

In enzymology, a CDP-ribitol ribitolphosphotransferase (EC 2.7.8.14) is an enzyme that catalyzes the chemical reaction

CDP-ribitol + (ribitol phosphate)n $\rightleftharpoons$ CMP + (ribitol phosphate)n^{+}1

Thus, the two substrates of this enzyme are CDP-ribitol and (ribitol phosphate)n, whereas its two products are CMP and (ribitol phosphate)n+1.

This enzyme belongs to the family of transferases, specifically those transferring non-standard substituted phosphate groups. The systematic name of this enzyme class is CDP-ribitol:poly(ribitol phosphate) ribitolphosphotransferase. Other names in common use include teichoic-acid synthase, polyribitol phosphate synthetase, teichoate synthetase, poly(ribitol phosphate) synthetase, polyribitol phosphate polymerase, and teichoate synthase.
