= Ethanolamine-phosphate cytidylyltransferase =

Class of enzyme

Identifiers
- EC no.: 2.7.7.14
- CAS no.: 9026-33-9

Databases
- IntEnz: IntEnz view
- BRENDA: BRENDA entry
- ExPASy: NiceZyme view
- KEGG: KEGG entry
- MetaCyc: metabolic pathway
- PRIAM: profile
- PDB structures: RCSB PDB PDBe PDBsum
- Gene Ontology: AmiGO / QuickGO
Search
- PMC: articles
- PubMed: articles
- NCBI: proteins

Ethanolamine-phosphate cytidylyltransferase (EC 2.7.7.14) is an enzyme that catalyzes the chemical reaction

cytidine triphosphate
+
phosphorylethanolamine
PP_{i}
CDP-ethanolamine

The enzyme characterised from rat liver combines cytidine triphosphate and phosphorylethanolamine to give cytidine diphosphate ethanolamine (CDP-ethanolamine), with pyrophosphate (PP_{i}) as a byproduct.

This enzyme is a transferase, specifically one transferring phosphorus-containing nucleotide groups (nucleotidyltransferases). The systematic name of this enzyme class is CTP:ethanolamine-phosphate cytidylyltransferase. Other names in common use include phosphorylethanolamine transferase, ET, CTP-phosphoethanolamine cytidylyltransferase, phosphoethanolamine cytidylyltransferase, and ethanolamine phosphate cytidylyltransferase.
