= Neolactotetraosylceramide alpha-2,3-sialyltransferase =

Class of enzymes

neolactotetraosylceramide alpha-2,3-sialyltransferase

Identifiers
- EC no.: 2.4.99.10
- CAS no.: 83745-06-6

Databases
- IntEnz: IntEnz view
- BRENDA: BRENDA entry
- ExPASy: NiceZyme view
- KEGG: KEGG entry
- MetaCyc: metabolic pathway
- PRIAM: profile
- PDB structures: RCSB PDB PDBe PDBsum
- Gene Ontology: AmiGO / QuickGO
Search
- PMC: articles
- PubMed: articles
- NCBI: proteins

In enzymology, a neolactotetraosylceramide alpha-2,3-sialyltransferase (EC 2.4.99.10) is an enzyme that catalyzes the chemical reaction

CMP-N-acetylneuraminate + beta-D-galactosyl-1,4-N-acetyl-beta-D-glucosaminyl-1,3-beta-D- galactosyl-1,4-D-glucosylceramide $\rightleftharpoons$ CMP + alpha-N-acetylneuraminyl-2,3-beta-D-galactosyl-1,4-N-acetyl-beta-D- glucosaminyl-1,3-beta-D-galactosyl-1,4-D-glucosylceramide

The 3 substrates of this enzyme are CMP-N-acetylneuraminate, beta-D-galactosyl-1,4-N-acetyl-beta-D-glucosaminyl-1,3-beta-D-, and galactosyl-1,4-D-glucosylceramide, whereas its 3 products are CMP, alpha-N-acetylneuraminyl-2,3-beta-D-galactosyl-1,4-N-acetyl-beta-D-, and glucosaminyl-1,3-beta-D-galactosyl-1,4-D-glucosylceramide.

This enzyme belongs to the family of transferases, specifically those glycosyltransferases that do not transfer hexosyl or pentosyl groups. The systematic name of this enzyme class is CMP-N-acetylneuraminate:neolactotetraosylceramide alpha-2,3-sialyltransferase. Other names in common use include cytidine monophosphoacetylneuraminate-neolactotetraosylceramide, sialyltransferase, sialyltransferase 3, and SAT-3. This enzyme participates in glycosphingolipid biosynthesis - neo-lactoseries and glycan structures - biosynthesis 2.
