= Monosialoganglioside sialyltransferase =

Class of enzymes

monosialoganglioside sialyltransferase

Identifiers
- EC no.: 2.4.99.2
- CAS no.: 60202-12-2

Databases
- IntEnz: IntEnz view
- BRENDA: BRENDA entry
- ExPASy: NiceZyme view
- KEGG: KEGG entry
- MetaCyc: metabolic pathway
- PRIAM: profile
- PDB structures: RCSB PDB PDBe PDBsum
- Gene Ontology: AmiGO / QuickGO
Search
- PMC: articles
- PubMed: articles
- NCBI: proteins

In enzymology, a monosialoganglioside sialyltransferase (EC 2.4.99.2) is an enzyme that catalyzes the chemical reaction

CMP-N-acetylneuraminate + D-galactosyl-N-acetyl-D-galactosaminyl-(N-acetylneuraminyl)-D-galactosyl-D-glucosylceramide $\rightleftharpoons$ CMP + N-acetylneuraminyl-D-galactosyl-N-acetyl-D-galactosaminyl-(N-acetylneuraminyl)-D-galactosyl-D-glucosylceramide

The 2 substrates of this enzyme are CMP-N-acetylneuraminate and D-galactosyl-N-acetyl-D-galactosaminyl-(N-acetylneuraminyl)-D-galactosyl-D-glucosylceramide, whereas its 2 products are CMP and N-acetylneuraminyl-D-galactosyl-N-acetyl-D-galactosaminyl-(N-acetylneuraminyl)-D-galactosyl-D-glucosylceramide.

This enzyme belongs to the family of transferases, specifically those glycosyltransferases that do not transfer hexosyl or pentosyl groups. The systematic name of this enzyme class is CMP-N-acetylneuraminate:D-galactosyl-N-acetyl-D-galactosaminyl-(N-ac etylneuraminyl)-D-galactosyl-D-glucosylceramide N-acetylneuraminyltransferase.
