= 1-alkenyl-2-acylglycerol choline phosphotransferase =

Class of enzymes

Identifiers
- EC no.: 2.7.8.22
- CAS no.: 113066-36-7

Databases
- IntEnz: IntEnz view
- BRENDA: BRENDA entry
- ExPASy: NiceZyme view
- KEGG: KEGG entry
- MetaCyc: metabolic pathway
- PRIAM: profile
- PDB structures: RCSB PDB PDBe PDBsum
- Gene Ontology: AmiGO / QuickGO
Search
- PMC: articles
- PubMed: articles
- NCBI: proteins

In enzymology, a 1-alkenyl-2-acylglycerol choline phosphotransferase (EC 2.7.8.22) is an enzyme that catalyzes the chemical reaction

CDP-choline + 1-alkenyl-2-acylglycerol $\rightleftharpoons$ CMP + plasmenylcholine

Thus, the two substrates of this enzyme are CDP-choline and 1-alkenyl-2-acylglycerol, whereas its two products are CMP and plasmenylcholine.

This enzyme belongs to the family of transferases, specifically those transferring non-standard substituted phosphate groups. The systematic name of this enzyme class is CDP-choline:1-alkenyl-2-acylglycerol cholinephosphotransferase. This enzyme is also called CDP-choline-1-alkenyl-2-acyl-glycerol phosphocholinetransferase. This enzyme participates in ether lipid metabolism.
