= CHKB =

CHKB may refer to:

- Choline kinase beta, a human gene
- Christian Historical Voters' League, a Dutch conservative Protestant political party.
