= Ceramide cholinephosphotransferase =

ceramide cholinephosphotransferase

Identifiers
- EC no.: 2.7.8.3
- CAS no.: 9026-14-6

Databases
- IntEnz: IntEnz view
- BRENDA: BRENDA entry
- ExPASy: NiceZyme view
- KEGG: KEGG entry
- MetaCyc: metabolic pathway
- PRIAM: profile
- PDB structures: RCSB PDB PDBe PDBsum
- Gene Ontology: AmiGO / QuickGO
Search
- PMC: articles
- PubMed: articles
- NCBI: proteins

In enzymology, a ceramide cholinephosphotransferase (EC 2.7.8.3) is an enzyme that catalyzes the chemical reaction

CDP-choline + N-acylsphingosine $\rightleftharpoons$ CMP + sphingomyelin

Thus, the two substrates of this enzyme are CDP-choline and N-acylsphingosine, whereas its two products are CMP and sphingomyelin.

This enzyme belongs to the family of transferases, specifically those transferring non-standard substituted phosphate groups. The systematic name of this enzyme class is CDP-choline:N-acylsphingosine cholinephosphotransferase. This enzyme is also called phosphorylcholine-ceramide transferase. This enzyme participates in sphingolipid metabolism.
