= Beta-galactoside alpha-2,6-sialyltransferase =

Enzyme

beta-galactoside alpha-2,6-sialyltransferase

Identifiers
- EC no.: 2.4.3.1
- CAS no.: 9075-81-4

Databases
- IntEnz: IntEnz view
- BRENDA: BRENDA entry
- ExPASy: NiceZyme view
- KEGG: KEGG entry
- MetaCyc: metabolic pathway
- PRIAM: profile
- PDB structures: RCSB PDB PDBe PDBsum
- Gene Ontology: AmiGO / QuickGO
Search
- PMC: articles
- PubMed: articles
- NCBI: proteins

In enzymology, a beta-galactoside alpha-2,6-sialyltransferase (EC 2.4.3.1) is an enzyme that catalyzes the chemical reaction

CMP-N-acetylneuraminate + beta-D-galactosyl-1,4-N-acetyl-beta-D-glucosamine $\rightleftharpoons$ CMP + alpha-N-acetylneuraminyl-2,6-beta-D-galactosyl-1,4-N-acetyl-beta-D- glucosamine

Thus, the two substrates of this enzyme are CMP-N-acetylneuraminate and beta-D-galactosyl-1,4-N-acetyl-beta-D-glucosamine, whereas its three products are CMP, alpha-N-acetylneuraminyl-2,6-beta-D-galactosyl-1,4-N-acetyl-beta-D-, and glucosamine.

This enzyme belongs to the family of transferases, specifically those glycosyltransferases that do not transfer hexosyl or pentosyl groups. The systematic name of this enzyme class is CMP-N-acetylneuraminate:beta-D-galactosyl-1,4-N-acetyl-beta-D-glucos amine alpha-2,6-N-acetylneuraminyltransferase. This enzyme participates in n-glycan biosynthesis and glycan structures - biosynthesis 1.
