= CDP-diacylglycerol—inositol 3-phosphatidyltransferase =

Transferase enzyme

CDP-diacylglycerol-inositol 3-phosphatidyltransferase
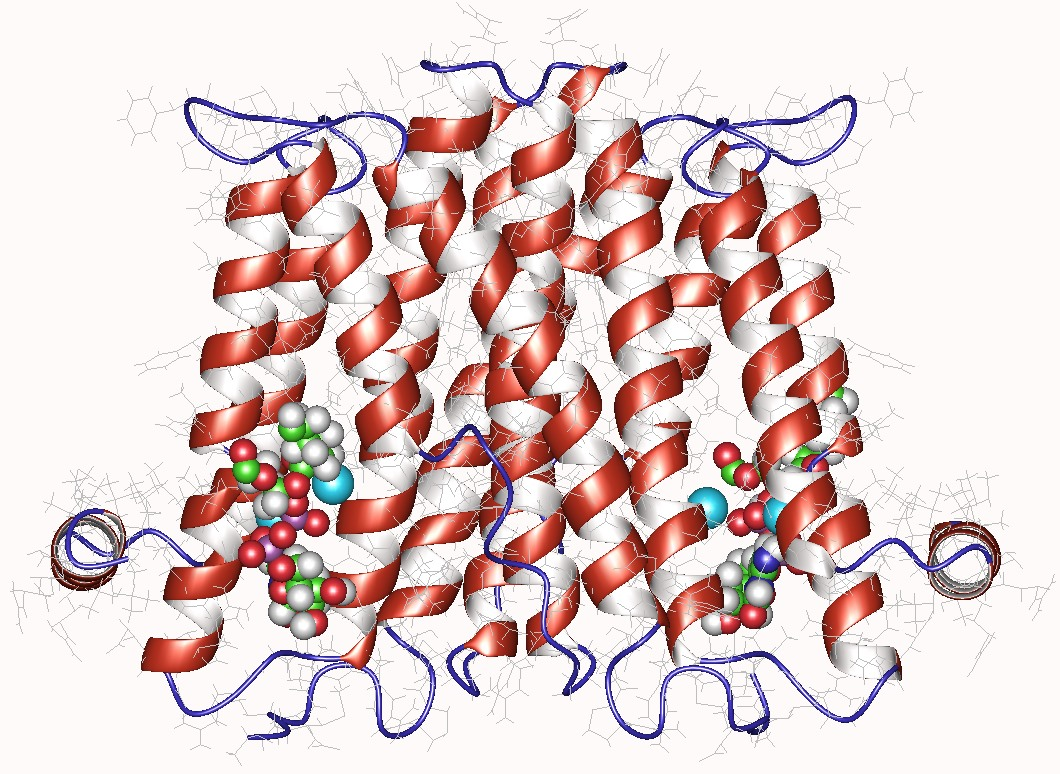
- CDP-diacylglycerol--inositol 3-phosphatidyltransferase homodimer, Mycobacterium tuberculosis

Identifiers
- EC no.: 2.7.8.11
- CAS no.: 9027-01-4

Databases
- IntEnz: IntEnz view
- BRENDA: BRENDA entry
- ExPASy: NiceZyme view
- KEGG: KEGG entry
- MetaCyc: metabolic pathway
- PRIAM: profile
- PDB structures: RCSB PDB PDBe PDBsum
- Gene Ontology: AmiGO / QuickGO
Search
- PMC: articles
- PubMed: articles
- NCBI: proteins

In enzymology, a CDP-diacylglycerol—inositol 3-phosphatidyltransferase (EC 2.7.8.11) is an enzyme that catalyzes the chemical reaction

CDP-diacylglycerol + myo-inositol $\rightleftharpoons$ CMP + phosphatidyl-1D-myo-inositol

Thus, the two substrates of this enzyme are CDP-diacylglycerol and myo-inositol, whereas its two products are CMP and phosphatidyl-1D-myo-inositol.

This enzyme belongs to the family of transferases, specifically those transferring non-standard substituted phosphate groups. The systematic name of this enzyme class is CDP-diacylglycerol:myo-inositol 3-phosphatidyltransferase. Other names in common use include CDP-diglyceride-inositol phosphatidyltransferase, phosphatidylinositol synthase, CDP-diacylglycerol-inositol phosphatidyltransferase, CDP-diglyceride:inositol transferase, cytidine 5'-diphospho-1,2-diacyl-sn-glycerol:myo-inositol, 3-phosphatidyltransferase, CDP-DG:inositol transferase, cytidine diphosphodiglyceride-inositol phosphatidyltransferase, CDP-diacylglycerol:myo-inositol-3-phosphatidyltransferase, CDP-diglyceride-inositol transferase, cytidine diphosphoglyceride-inositol phosphatidyltransferase, and cytidine diphosphoglyceride-inositol transferase. This enzyme participates in glycerophospholipid metabolism and phosphatidylinositol signaling system.
