= Sphingosine cholinephosphotransferase =

sphingosine cholinephosphotransferase

Identifiers
- EC no.: 2.7.8.10
- CAS no.: 9027-12-7

Databases
- IntEnz: IntEnz view
- BRENDA: BRENDA entry
- ExPASy: NiceZyme view
- KEGG: KEGG entry
- MetaCyc: metabolic pathway
- PRIAM: profile
- PDB structures: RCSB PDB PDBe PDBsum
- Gene Ontology: AmiGO / QuickGO
Search
- PMC: articles
- PubMed: articles
- NCBI: proteins

In enzymology, a sphingosine cholinephosphotransferase (EC 2.7.8.10) is an enzyme that catalyzes the chemical reaction

CDP-choline + sphingosine $\rightleftharpoons$ CMP + sphingosyl-phosphocholine

Thus, the two substrates of this enzyme are CDP-choline and sphingosine, whereas its two products are CMP and sphingosyl-phosphocholine.

This enzyme belongs to the family of transferases, specifically those transferring non-standard substituted phosphate groups. The systematic name of this enzyme class is CDP-choline:sphingosine cholinephosphotransferase. Other names in common use include CDP-choline-sphingosine cholinephosphotransferase, phosphorylcholine-sphingosine transferase, cytidine diphosphocholine-sphingosine cholinephosphotransferase, and sphingosine choline phosphotransferase. This enzyme participates in sphingolipid metabolism.
