= Serine-ethanolaminephosphate phosphodiesterase =

serine-ethanolaminephosphate phosphodiesterase

Identifiers
- EC no.: 3.1.4.13
- CAS no.: 37288-20-3

Databases
- BRENDA: enzyme data
- ExPASy: NiceZyme view
- KEGG: enzyme entry
- MetaCyc: metabolic pathway
- Rhea: reactions
- PDB structures: RCSB PDB PDBe PDBsum
- Gene Ontology: AmiGO / QuickGO
Search
- PMC: articles
- PubMed: articles
- NCBI: proteins

The enzyme serine-ethanolaminephosphate phosphodiesterase (EC 3.1.4.13) catalyzes the reaction

L-serine phosphoethanolamine
H_{2}O
L-serine
+
phosphorylethanolamine

The enzyme characterised from chicken kidney and muscle hydrolyses L-serine phosphoethanolamine to its components L-serine and phosphorylethanolamine.

This enzyme is a hydrolase, specifically one acting on phosphoric diester bonds. The systematic name is serine-phosphoethanolamine ethanolaminephosphohydrolase. Other names in common use include serine ethanolamine phosphodiester phosphodiesterase, and SEP diesterase.
