= Alkylphosphocholine =

Class of chemical compounds

Alkylphosphocholines are phospholipid-like molecules that have been synthesised, which have remarkable biological and therapeutic activities. They are phosphocholine esters of aliphatic long chain alcohols differing in chain length, unsaturation and position of the cis-double bond.

The utilization of alkylphosphocholine analogues has been found be to useful for the treatment of specific types of cancer, such as gliomas and brain metastases. These analogues function through inhibiting signal transduction pathways of mitosis and triggering apoptosis of cancer cells. Alkylphosphocholine analogues are seen to be more of an efficient treatment for cancer than other drugs as they avoid causing DNA damage and myelotoxicity.

== Research ==
Analogs of alkylphosphocholines were previously synthesized and shown to have applications in both diagnostic cancer imaging and cancer therapy through in vivo and in vitro experiments. The alkylphosphocoline analog CLR1404 was observed to be selectively absorbed by tumor cells in both human patients with advanced metastatic cancer and mouse models through both PET imaging with the radioactive isotope iodine-124 as well as through SPECT imaging with the therapeutic radioisotope iodine-131. One of the causes for this selective uptake of CLR1404 was hypothesized to be due to interactions between the analog and lipid rafts of the cancer cell membrane as treatment with the compound filipin III, which disturbs lipid rafts, resulted in less uptake of the alkylphosphocoline analog.

Through in vitro studies, alkylphosphocolines were observed to impede cell division of human retinal pigment epithelium (RPE) cells. This has therapeutic implications on the treatment of proliferative vitreoretinopathy, as this condition can lead to retinal detachment through the abnormal growth and contraction of retinal membranes with RPE cells being significant in facilitating this process. It was experimentally demonstrated that alkylphosphocolines are able to decrease the activity of protein kinase C in human RGE cells in vitro, which is one hypothesized way that it is able to impede cell division of human RPE cells.

== Erucylphosphocholine ==
Erucylphosphocholine is an alkylphosphocholine analogue that can be used in the treatment of brain tumors within humans. The usage of the erucylphosphocholine analogue is unique when compared to other alkylphosphocholine analogues because it was the first analogue that has been found to be able to be delivered directly into a patient's veins. This analogue has been found to be useful for the treatment of astrocytoma and glioblastoma cells which are found to be resistant to some methods of chemotherapy. It was found to alter a signaling pathway within the cell cycle and cause tumor cells to enter cell cycle arrest at either the G2 phase or M phase in addition possessing the ability to induce apoptosis.

== See also ==
- Miltefosine
