= Choline-phosphate cytidylyltransferase =

Class of enzyme

choline-phosphate cytidylyltransferase

Identifiers
- EC no.: 2.7.7.15
- CAS no.: 9026-34-0

Databases
- IntEnz: IntEnz view
- BRENDA: BRENDA entry
- ExPASy: NiceZyme view
- KEGG: KEGG entry
- MetaCyc: metabolic pathway
- PRIAM: profile
- PDB structures: RCSB PDB PDBe PDBsum
- Gene Ontology: AmiGO / QuickGO
Search
- PMC: articles
- PubMed: articles
- NCBI: proteins

Choline-phosphate cytidylyltransferase (EC 2.7.7.15) is an enzyme that catalyzes the chemical reaction

cytidine triphosphate
+
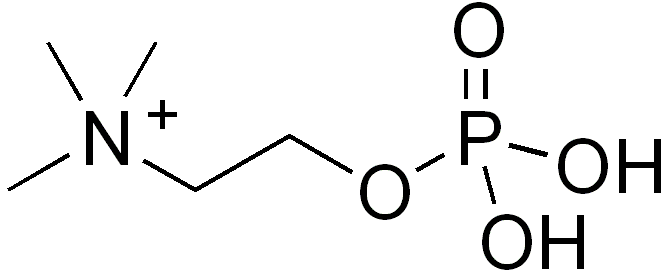
phosphocholine
PP_{i}
citicoline

The enzyme characterised from guinea pig liver combines cytidine triphosphate and phosphocholine to give citicoline, with pyrophosphate (PP_{i}) as a byproduct. It is responsible for regulating phosphatidylcholine content in membranes.

In humans, the enzyme protein is encoded by the genes PCYT1A and PCYT1B. These have been extensively studied.

This enzyme is a transferase, specifically one transferring phosphorus-containing nucleotide groups (nucleotidyltransferases). The systematic name of this enzyme class is CTP:choline-phosphate cytidylyltransferase. Other names in common use include phosphorylcholine transferase, CDP-choline pyrophosphorylase, CDP-choline synthetase, choline phosphate cytidylyltransferase, CTP-phosphocholine cytidylyltransferase, CTP:phosphorylcholine cytidylyltransferase, cytidine diphosphocholine pyrophosphorylase, phosphocholine cytidylyltransferase, phosphorylcholine cytidylyltransferase, and phosphorylcholine:CTP cytidylyltransferase.

== Structural studies ==
As of late 2007, two structures have been solved for this class of enzymes, with PDB accession codes PDB: 1PEH and PDB: 1PEI.
