= Diacylglycerol cholinephosphotransferase =

Type of enzyme

diacylglycerol cholinephosphotransferase

Identifiers
- EC no.: 2.7.8.2
- CAS no.: 9026-13-5

Databases
- IntEnz: IntEnz view
- BRENDA: BRENDA entry
- ExPASy: NiceZyme view
- KEGG: KEGG entry
- MetaCyc: metabolic pathway
- PRIAM: profile
- PDB structures: RCSB PDB PDBe PDBsum
- Gene Ontology: AmiGO / QuickGO
Search
- PMC: articles
- PubMed: articles
- NCBI: proteins

In enzymology, a diacylglycerol cholinephosphotransferase (EC 2.7.8.2) is an enzyme that catalyzes the chemical reaction

CDP-choline + 1,2-diacylglycerol $\rightleftharpoons$ CMP + a phosphatidylcholine

Thus, the two substrates of this enzyme are CDP-choline and 1,2-diacylglycerol, whereas its two products are CMP and phosphatidylcholine.

== Classification ==
This enzyme belongs to the family of transferases, specifically those transferring non-standard substituted phosphate groups.

== Nomenclature ==
The systematic name of this enzyme class is CDP choline:1,2-diacylglycerol cholinephosphotransferase. Other names in common use include:

- 1-alkyl-2-acetyl-m-glycerol:CDPcholine choline phosphotransferase,
- 1-alkyl-2-acetyl-sn-glycerol cholinephosphotransferase,
- 1-alkyl-2-acetylglycerol cholinephosphotransferase,
- alkylacylglycerol choline phosphotransferase,
- alkylacylglycerol cholinephosphotransferase,
- CDP-choline diglyceride phosphotransferase,
- cholinephosphotransferase,
- CPT,
- cytidine diphosphocholine glyceride transferase,
- cytidine diphosphorylcholine diglyceride transferase,
- diacylglycerol choline phosphotransferase,
- phosphocholine diacylglyceroltransferase,
- phosphorylcholine-glyceride transferase, and
- sn-1,2-diacylglycerol cholinephosphotransferase.

== Biological role ==
This enzyme participates in 3 metabolic pathways: aminophosphonate metabolism, glycerophospholipid metabolism, and ether lipid metabolism.
