= Boutron =

Boutron is a surname. Notable people with the surname include:

- Isabelle Boutron (born 1971), French epidemiologist
- Pierre Boutron (born 1947), Portugal-born French actor and director
