= PCYT1B =

Protein-coding gene in the species Homo sapiens

Identifiers
- Aliases: PCYT1B, CCTB, CTB, phosphate cytidylyltransferase 1, choline, beta, phosphate cytidylyltransferase 1B, choline
- External IDs: OMIM: 300948; MGI: 2147987; HomoloGene: 3564; GeneCards: PCYT1B; OMA:PCYT1B - orthologs

Gene location (Human)
Chr.	X chromosome (human)
Band	Xp22.11	Start	24,558,087 bp
Band	Xp22.11	End	24,672,677 bp

Gene location (Mouse)
Chr.	X chromosome (mouse)
Band	X|X C3	Start	92,698,469 bp
Band	X|X C3	End	92,793,557 bp
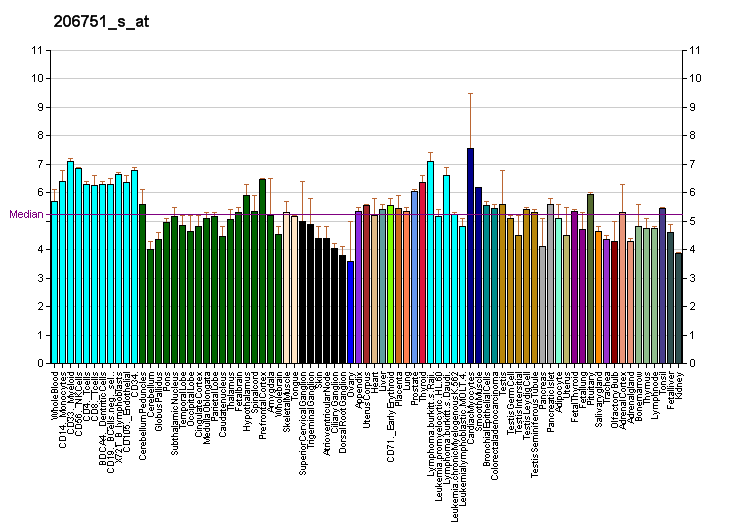

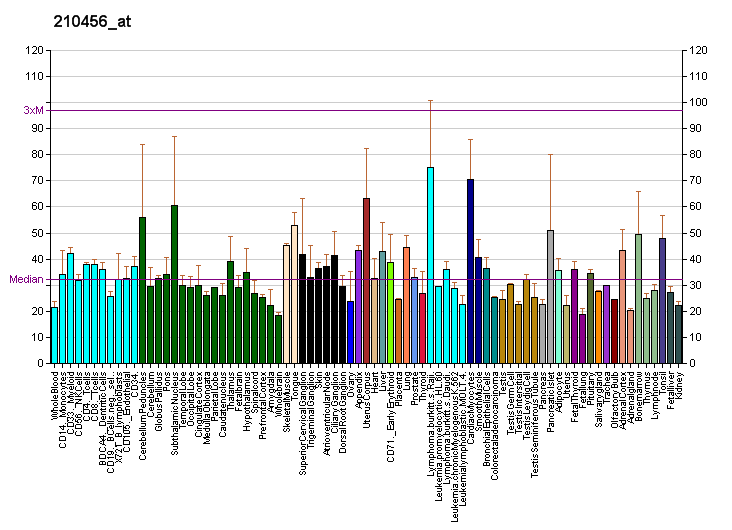
RNA expression pattern
Bgee	Human / Mouse (ortholog); Top expressed in: ventricular zone; ganglionic eminence; prefrontal cortex; C1 segment; amygdala; nucleus accumbens; left testis; cingulate gyrus; anterior cingulate cortex; right testis / Top expressed in: zygote; secondary oocyte; otolith organ; utricle; ganglionic eminence; dentate gyrus of hippocampal formation granule cell; piriform cortex; otic vesicle; respiratory epithelium; olfactory epithelium; More reference expression data
BioGPS	More reference expression data
Gene ontology
Molecular function	nucleotidyltransferase activity; catalytic activity; transferase activity; choline-phosphate cytidylyltransferase activity; phosphatidylcholine binding
Cellular component	endoplasmic reticulum membrane; cytoplasm; endoplasmic reticulum
Biological process	phospholipid biosynthetic process; phosphatidylcholine biosynthetic process; biosynthesis; spermatogenesis; ovarian follicle development; lipid metabolism; CDP-choline pathway
Sources:Amigo / QuickGO
Orthologs
Species	Human	Mouse
Entrez	9468	236899
Ensembl	ENSG00000102230	ENSMUSG00000035246
UniProt	Q9Y5K3	Q811Q9
RefSeq (mRNA)	NM_001163264; NM_001163265; NM_004845	NM_177546; NM_211138
RefSeq (protein)	NP_001156736; NP_001156737; NP_004836	NP_808214; NP_997593
Location (UCSC)	Chr X: 24.56 – 24.67 Mb	Chr X: 92.7 – 92.79 Mb
PubMed search
- Wikidata
View/Edit Human	View/Edit Mouse

Choline-phosphate cytidylyltransferase B is an enzyme that in humans is encoded by the PCYT1B gene.

== See also ==
Choline-phosphate cytidylyltransferase
