= CMP kinase =

Enzyme found in humans

CMPK1
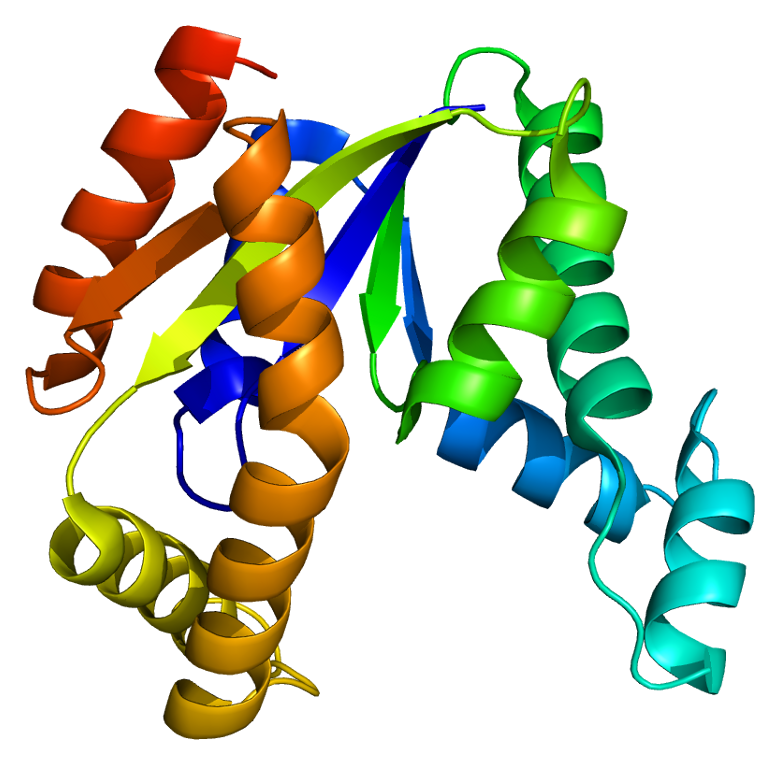

Identifiers
- Aliases: CMPK1, CK, CMK, CMPK, UMK, UMP-CMPK, UMPK, cytidine/uridine monophosphate kinase 1
- External IDs: OMIM: 191710; MGI: 1913838; GeneCards: CMPK1
Available structures
PDB	Ortholog search: PDBe RCSB
PDB	List of PDB id codes 1TEV
Enzyme activity
EC #	BRENDA	ExPASy	KEGG	MetaCyc
2.7.4.6	↗	↗	↗	↗
2.7.4.14	↗	↗	↗	↗

Gene location (Human)
Chr.	Chromosome 1 (human)
Band	1p33	Start	47,333,790 bp
Band	1p33	End	47,378,839 bp

Gene location (Mouse)
Chr.	Chromosome 4 (mouse)
Band	4|4 D1	Start	114,816,533 bp
Band	4|4 D1	End	114,844,438 bp
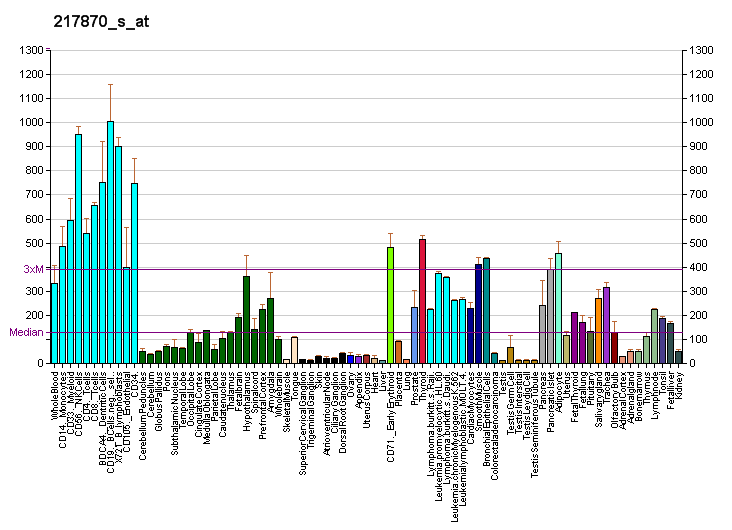
RNA expression pattern
Bgee	Human / Mouse (ortholog); Top expressed in: jejunal mucosa; palpebral conjunctiva; parotid gland; mucosa of sigmoid colon; duodenum; rectum; epithelium of nasopharynx; tibia; oral cavity; Achilles tendon / Top expressed in: saccule; otic placode; otic vesicle; left colon; olfactory epithelium; gastric mucosa; mucous cell of stomach; epithelium of stomach; crypt of lieberkuhn of small intestine; intestinal villus; More reference expression data
BioGPS	More reference expression data
Gene ontology
Molecular function	transferase activity; nucleotide binding; uridylate kinase activity; kinase activity; nucleobase-containing compound kinase activity; uridine kinase activity; nucleoside diphosphate kinase activity; ATP binding; cytidylate kinase activity; nucleoside monophosphate kinase activity
Cellular component	cytoplasm; cytosol; extracellular exosome; nucleus; nucleolus
Biological process	nucleobase-containing small molecule interconversion; phosphorylation; nucleoside diphosphate phosphorylation; pyrimidine ribonucleotide biosynthetic process; pyrimidine nucleotide biosynthetic process; 'de novo' pyrimidine nucleobase biosynthetic process; nucleoside triphosphate biosynthetic process; nucleobase-containing compound metabolic process; nucleoside monophosphate phosphorylation; UMP biosynthetic process
Sources:Amigo / QuickGO
Orthologs
Databases	NCBI: entry; OMA: entry
Species	Human	Mouse
Entrez	51727	66588
Ensembl	ENSG00000162368	ENSMUSG00000028719
UniProt	P30085	Q9DBP5
RefSeq (mRNA)	NM_001136140; NM_016308; NM_001366135	NM_025647
RefSeq (protein)	NP_001129612; NP_057392; NP_001353064	NP_079923
Location (UCSC)	Chr 1: 47.33 – 47.38 Mb	Chr 4: 114.82 – 114.84 Mb
PubMed search
- Wikidata
View/Edit Human	View/Edit Mouse

UMP-CMP kinase is an enzyme that in humans is encoded by the CMPK1 gene.

== Function ==
Uridine monophosphate (UMP)/cytidine monophosphate (CMP) kinase (EC 2.7.4.4) catalyzes the phosphoryl transfer from ATP to UMP, CMP, and deoxy-CMP (dCMP), resulting in the formation of ADP and the corresponding nucleoside diphosphate. These nucleoside diphosphates are required for cellular nucleic acid synthesis.
