= CHKA =

Protein-coding gene in humans

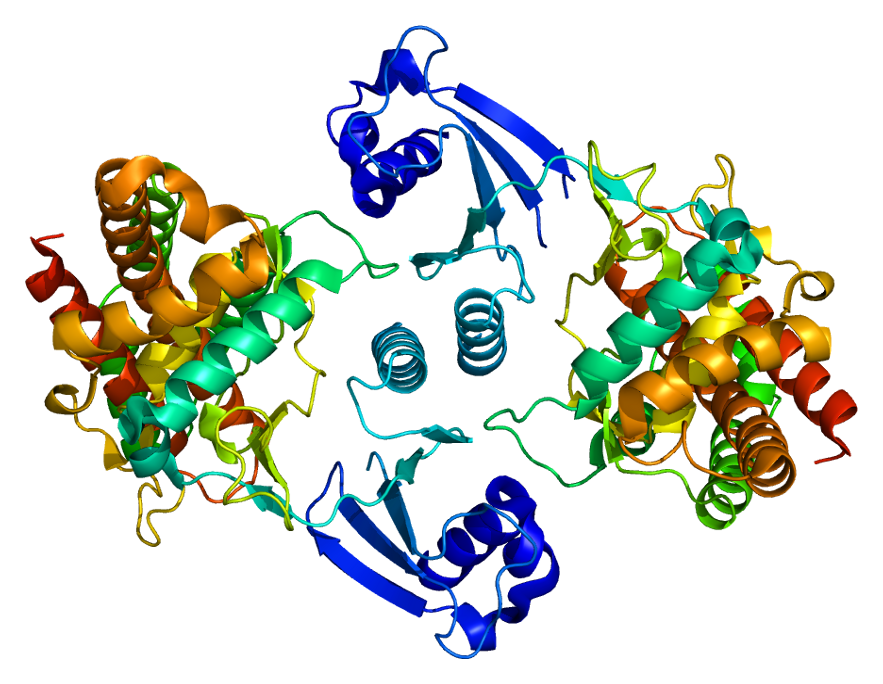

Identifiers
- Aliases: CHKA, CHK, CK, CKI, EK, choline kinase alpha
- External IDs: OMIM: 118491; MGI: 107760; GeneCards: CHKA
Available structures
| PDB | Ortholog search: PDBe RCSB |
| PDB | List of PDB id codes 2CKO, 2CKP, 2CKQ, 2I7Q, 3F2R, 3G15, 3ZM9, 4BR3, 4CG8, 4CG9, 4CGA, 4DA5, 5AFV, 5EQE, 5EQP, 5EQY, 5FTG |
Enzyme activity
| EC # | BRENDA | ExPASy | KEGG | MetaCyc |
|---|---|---|---|---|
| 2.7.1.32 | ↗ | ↗ | ↗ | ↗ |
| 2.7.1.82 | ↗ | ↗ | ↗ | ↗ |

Gene location (Human)
| Chr. | Chromosome 11 (human) |
| Band | 11q13.2 | Start | 68,052,859 bp |
| Band | 11q13.2 | End | 68,121,444 bp |

Gene location (Mouse)
| Chr. | Chromosome 19 (mouse) |
| Band | 19 A|19 3.57 cM | Start | 3,851,773 bp |
| Band | 19 A|19 3.57 cM | End | 3,894,369 bp |
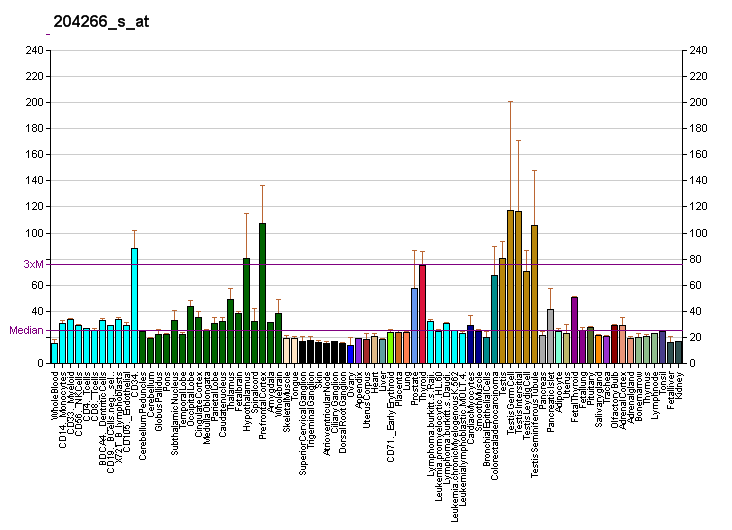

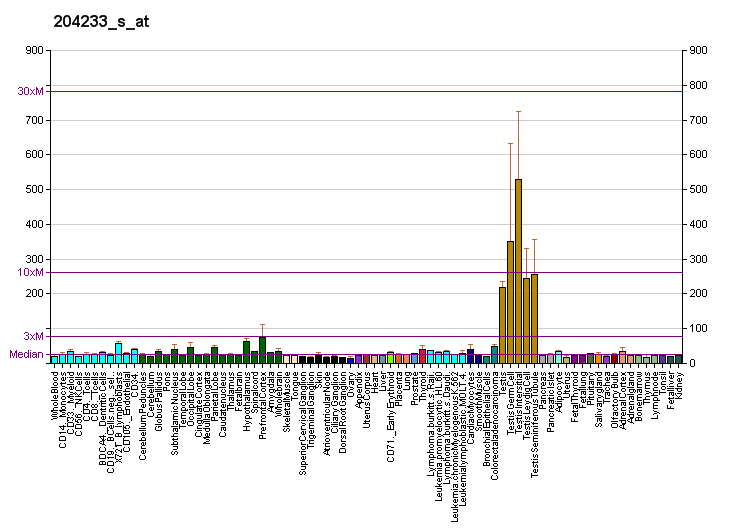
RNA expression pattern
| Bgee | Human / Mouse (ortholog); Top expressed in: left testis; right testis; right lobe of thyroid gland; left lobe of thyroid gland; body of pancreas; C1 segment; right frontal lobe; mucosa of transverse colon; gastric mucosa; body of stomach / Top expressed in: spermatocyte; morula; medullary collecting duct; spermatid; superior frontal gyrus; submandibular gland; tail of embryo; cerebellar cortex; neural layer of retina; duodenum; More reference expression data |
| BioGPS | More reference expression data |
Gene ontology
| Molecular function | transferase activity; nucleotide binding; protein homodimerization activity; cholinesterase activity; signal transducer activity; choline binding; kinase activity; ATP binding; ethanolamine kinase activity; choline kinase activity |
| Cellular component | cytoplasm; cytosol |
| Biological process | lipid transport; ethanolamine metabolic process; choline metabolic process; phosphorylation; lipid metabolism; response to 3-methylcholanthrene; phospholipid biosynthetic process; response to toxic substance; CDP-choline pathway; signal transduction; phosphatidylcholine biosynthetic process; phosphatidylethanolamine biosynthetic process |
Sources:Amigo / QuickGO
Orthologs
| Databases | NCBI: entry; OMA: entry |
| Species | Human | Mouse |
| Entrez | 1119 | 12660 |
| Ensembl | ENSG00000110721 | ENSMUSG00000024843 |
| UniProt | P35790 | O54804 |
| RefSeq (mRNA) | NM_001277; NM_212469; NM_001376219; NM_001376220; NM_001376221 NM_001376222 | NM_001025566; NM_001271496; NM_013490 |
| RefSeq (protein) | NP_001268; NP_997634; NP_001363148; NP_001363149; NP_001363150 NP_001363151 | NP_001258425; NP_038518 |
| Location (UCSC) | Chr 11: 68.05 – 68.12 Mb | Chr 19: 3.85 – 3.89 Mb |
| PubMed search |
- Wikidata
| View/Edit Human | View/Edit Mouse |

Choline kinase alpha is an enzyme that in humans is encoded by the CHKA gene.

The major pathway for the biosynthesis of phosphatidylcholine occurs via the CDP-choline pathway. The protein encoded by this gene is the initial enzyme in the sequence and may play a regulatory role. The encoded protein also catalyzes the phosphorylation of ethanolamine. Two transcript variants encoding different isoforms have been found for this gene.

In melanocytic cells CHKA gene expression may be regulated by MITF.

== Clinical significance ==
Mutations of the CHKA gene cause a neurodevelopmental disorder with epilepsy and microcephaly.
