= Citicoline =

Chemical compound

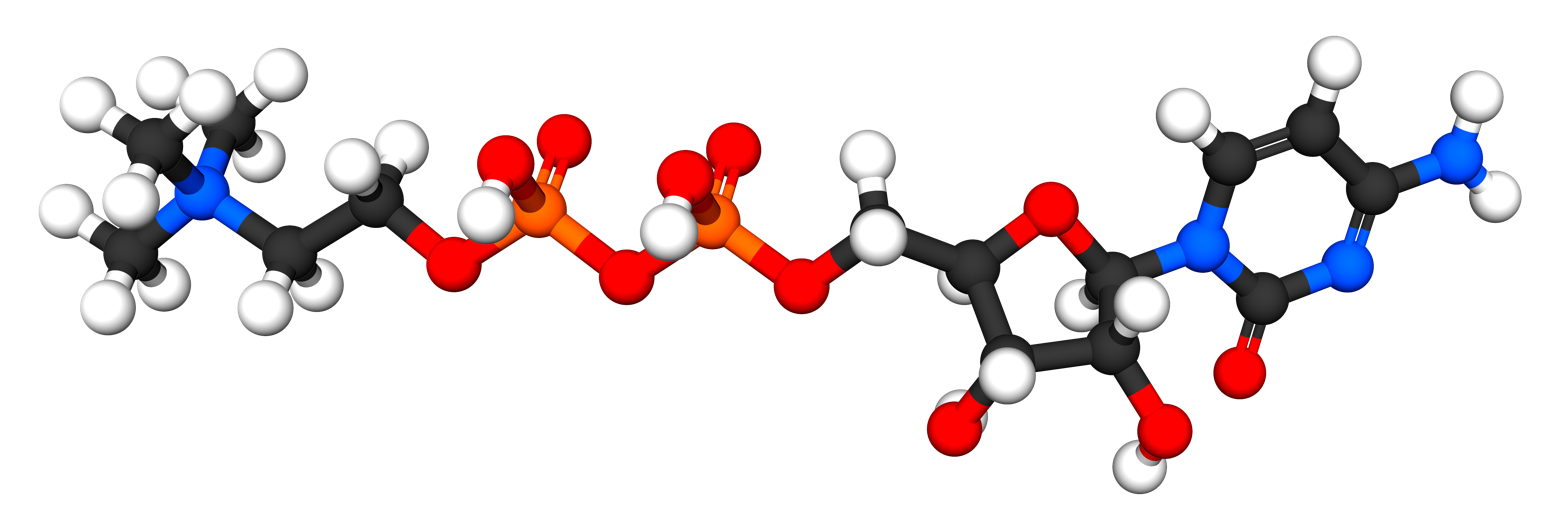

Clinical data
- Trade names: Neurocoline
- Other names: Cytidine diphosphate choline
- AHFS/Drugs.com: International Drug Names
- Routes of administration: oral
- ATC code: N06BX06 (WHO)

Legal status
- Legal status: US: OTC

Pharmacokinetic data
- Bioavailability: 90% oral
- Excretion: respiration (as CO2) and urine

Identifiers
- IUPAC name: 5'-O-[hydroxy({hydroxy[2-(trimethylammonio)ethoxy] phosphoryl}oxy)phosphoryl]cytidine
- CAS Number: 987-78-0
- PubChem CID: 11583971
- ChemSpider: 13207
- UNII: 536BQ2JVC7
- KEGG: D00057
- ChEBI: CHEBI:16436
- ChEMBL: ChEMBL1618340
- CompTox Dashboard (EPA): DTXSID9048431
- ECHA InfoCard: 100.012.346

Chemical and physical data
- Formula: C_{14}H_{27}N_{4}O_{11}P_{2}^{+}
- Molar mass: 489.335 g·mol^{−1}
- 3D model (JSmol): Interactive image
- SMILES: C[N+](C)(C)CCOP(=O)([O-])OP(=O)(O)OC[C@@H]1[C@@H](O)[C@@H](O)[C@@H](O1)N2C=CC(N)=NC2=O
- InChI: InChI=1S/C14H26N4O11P2/c1-18(2,3)6-7-26-30(22,23)29-31(24,25)27-8-9-11(19)12(20)13(28-9)17-5-4-10(15)16-14(17)21/h4-5,9,11-13,19-20H,6-8H2,1-3H3,(H3-,15,16,21,22,23,24,25)/t9-,11-,12-,13-/m1/s1; Key:RZZPDXZPRHQOCG-OJAKKHQRSA-N

Citicoline (INN), also known as cytidine diphosphate-choline (CDP-choline) or cytidine 5'-diphosphocholine is an intermediate in the generation of phosphatidylcholine from choline, a common biochemical process in cell membranes. Citicoline is naturally occurring in the cells of human and animal tissue, in particular the organs.

== Use as a dietary supplement ==
Citicoline is available as a supplement in over 70 countries under a variety of brand names: CereBleu, Cebroton, Ceraxon, Cidilin, Citifar, Cognizin, Difosfocin, Hipercol, NeurAxon, Nicholin, Sinkron, Somazina, Synapsine, Startonyl, Trausan, Xerenoos, etc. When taken as a supplement, citicoline is hydrolyzed into choline and cytidine in the intestine. Once these cross the blood–brain barrier, they are reformed into citicoline by the rate-limiting enzyme in phosphatidylcholine synthesis, CTP-phosphocholine cytidylyltransferase.

== Research ==
=== Ischemic stroke ===
Some preliminary research suggested that citicoline may reduce the rates of death and disability following an ischemic stroke. However, the largest citicoline clinical trial to date (a randomised, placebo-controlled, sequential trial of 2,298 patients with moderate-to-severe acute ischaemic stroke in Europe), found no benefit of administering citicoline on survival or recovery from stroke. A meta-analysis of seven trials reported no statistically significant benefit for long-term survival or recovery.

=== Vision ===
The effect of citicoline on visual function has been studied in patients with glaucoma, with possible positive effect for protecting vision.

== Mechanism of action ==
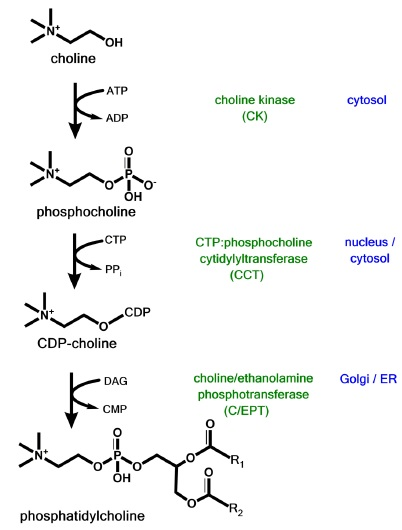
The CDP-choline pathway; enzymes named in green.

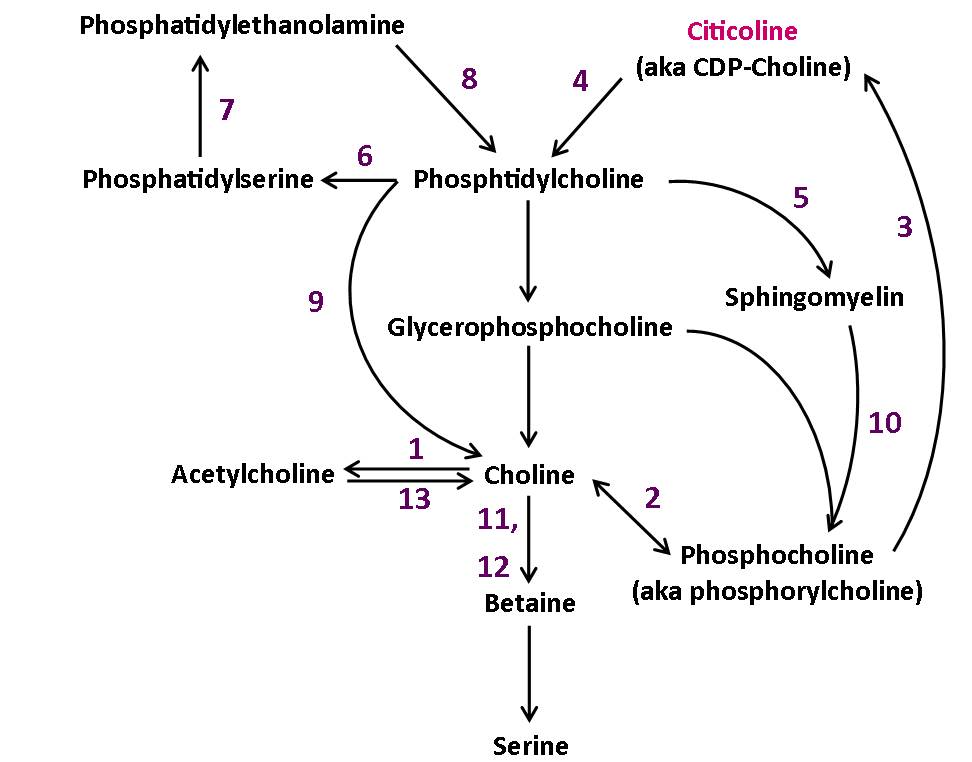
Enzymes involved in reactions are identified by numbers. See file description.

=== Neuroprotective effects ===
Citicoline may have neuroprotective effects due to its preservation of cardiolipin and sphingomyelin, preservation of arachidonic acid content of phosphatidylcholine and phosphatidylethanolamine, partial restoration of phosphatidylcholine levels, and stimulation of glutathione synthesis and glutathione reductase activity. Citicoline's effects may also be explained by the reduction of phospholipase A2 activity. Citicoline increases phosphatidylcholine synthesis. The mechanism for this may be:

- By converting 1, 2-diacylglycerol into phosphatidylcholine
- Stimulating the synthesis of SAMe, which aids in membrane stabilization and reduces levels of arachidonic acid. This is especially important after an ischemia when arachidonic acid levels are elevated.

=== Neuronal membrane ===
The brain preferentially uses choline to synthesize acetylcholine. This limits the amount of choline available to synthesize phosphatidylcholine. When the availability of choline is low or the need for acetylcholine increases, phospholipids containing choline can be catabolized from neuronal membranes. These phospholipids include sphingomyelin and phosphatidylcholine. Supplementation with citicoline can increase the amount of choline available for acetylcholine synthesis and aid in rebuilding membrane phospholipid stores after depletion. Citicoline decreases phospholipase stimulation. This can lower levels of hydroxyl radicals produced after an ischemia and prevent cardiolipin from being catabolized by phospholipase A2. It can also work to restore cardiolipin levels in the inner mitochondrial membrane.

=== Cell signalling ===
Citicoline may enhance cellular communication by increasing levels of neurotransmitters. The choline component of citicoline is used to create acetylcholine, which is a neurotransmitter in the human brain. Clinical trials have found that citicoline supplementation might improve focus and attention.

=== Glutamate transport ===
Citicoline lowers increased glutamate concentrations and raises decreased ATP concentrations induced by ischemia. Citicoline also increases glutamate uptake by increasing expression of EAAT2, a glutamate transporter, in vitro in rat astrocytes. It is suggested that the neuroprotective effects of citicoline after a stroke are due in part to citicoline's ability to decrease levels of glutamate in the brain. This is in part due to an indirect decrease in the extrasynaptic NMDA-TRMP4 death signaling pathway. It's important to also note it is only the extrasynaptic NMDA receptors responsible for excitotoxicity.

== Pharmacokinetics ==
Citicoline is water-soluble, with more than 90% oral bioavailability. Plasma levels of citicholine peak one hour after oral ingestion, and a majority of the citicoline is excreted as CO_{2} in respiration with the remaining citicoline being excreted through urine. The pharmacokinetic profile of citicholine cannot be described by a single smooth exponential decrease over time. However, the elimination half-life for citicholine has been reported as approximately 50 hours for citicholine removed via respiration and approximately 70 hours for citicholine removed via urine. Plasma levels of choline peak about four hours after ingestion.

=== Side effects ===
Citicoline has a very low toxicity profile in animals and humans. Clinically, doses of 2000 mg per day have been observed and approved. Minor transient adverse effects are rare and most commonly include stomach pain and diarrhea.

== Synthesis ==
=== In vivo ===
Phosphatidylcholine is a major phospholipid in eukaryotic cell membranes. Close regulation of its biosynthesis, degradation, and distribution is essential to proper cell function. Phosphatidylcholine is synthesized in vivo by two pathways

- The Kennedy pathway, which includes the transformation of choline to citicoline, by way of phosphorylcholine, produces phosphatidylcholine when condensed with diacylglycerol.
- Phosphatidylcholine can also be produced by the methylation pathway, where phosphatidylethanolamine is sequentially methylated.

== See also ==
- 1-alkenyl-2-acylglycerol choline phosphotransferase
- Ceramide cholinephosphotransferase
- CDP-choline pathway
- Choline-phosphate cytidylyltransferase
- Diacylglycerol cholinephosphotransferase
- Sphingosine cholinephosphotransferase
