= Ethanolamine kinase =

Class of enzymes

Identifiers
- EC no.: 2.7.1.82
- CAS no.: 9075-78-9

Databases
- BRENDA: enzyme data
- ExPASy: NiceZyme view
- KEGG: enzyme entry
- MetaCyc: metabolic pathway
- Rhea: reactions
- PDB structures: RCSB PDB PDBe PDBsum
- Gene Ontology: AmiGO / QuickGO
Search
- PMC: articles
- PubMed: articles
- NCBI: proteins

Ethanolamine kinase (EC 2.7.1.82) is an enzyme that catalyzes the chemical reaction

ATP +
ethanolamine
ADP +
phosphorylethanolamine

The enzyme first characterised from Ehrlich ascites cells converts ethanolamine to phosphorylethanolamine by transferring a phosphate group from the cofactor, adenosine triphosphate (ATP), which is converted to adenosine diphosphate (ADP).

This enzyme is a transferase, specifically one transferring phosphorus-containing groups (phosphotransferases) with an alcohol group as acceptor. The systematic name of this enzyme class is ATP:ethanolamine O-phosphotransferase. Other names in common use include ethanolamine kinase (phosphorylating), and ethanolamine phosphokinase.
