= Phosphoglyceric acid =

Phosphoglyceric acid may refer to:

- 2-Phosphoglyceric acid
- 3-Phosphoglyceric acid
