= Phosphocholine =

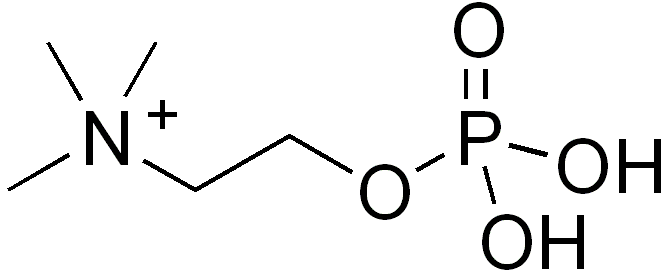

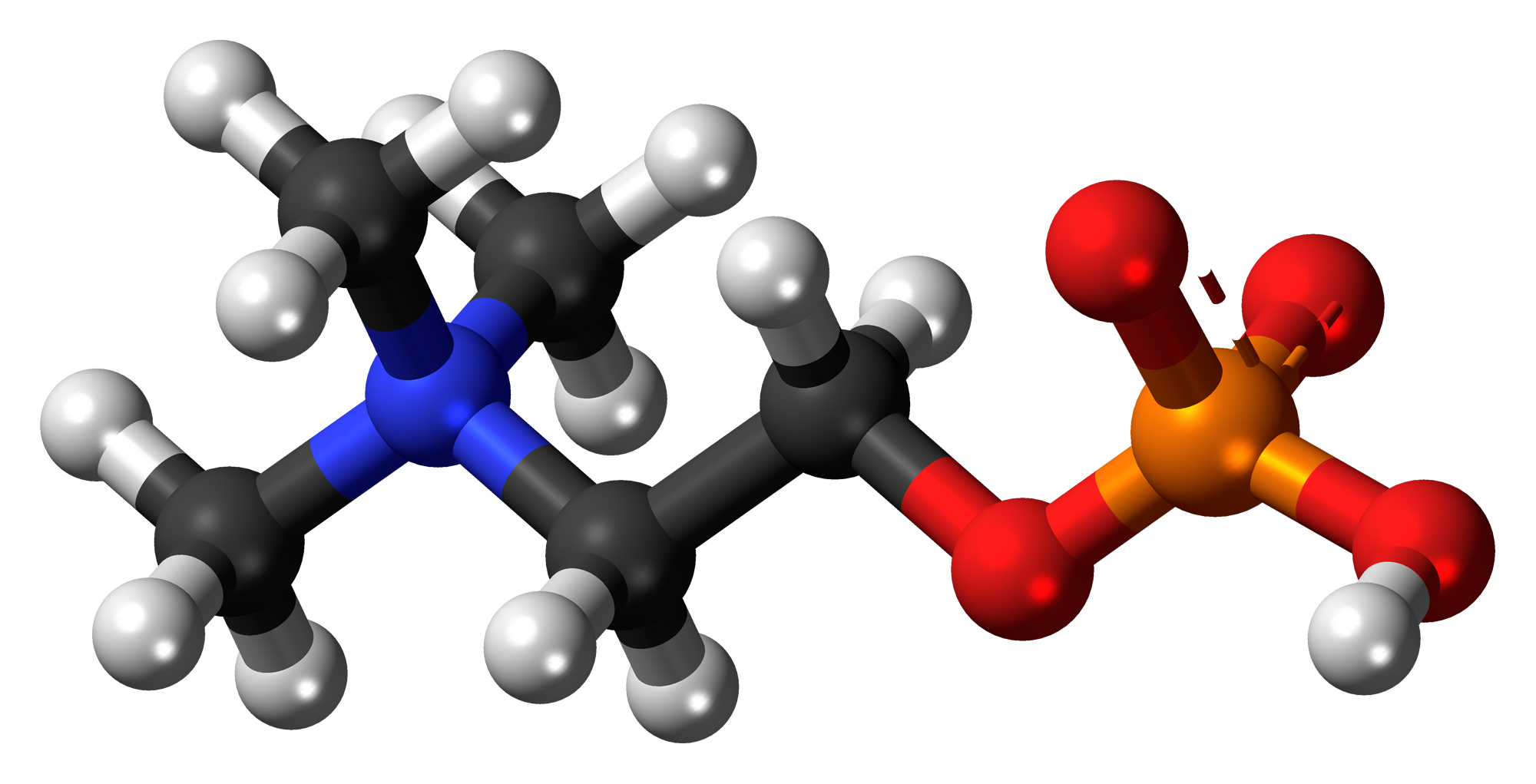

Names
- Other names Choline phosphate

Identifiers
CAS Number	107-73-3
3D model (JSmol)	Interactive image
ChemSpider	119298
MeSH	Phosphocholine
PubChem CID	1014
UNII	96AN057F7A
CompTox Dashboard (EPA)	DTXSID30861727
- InChI: InChI=1S/C5H14NO4P/c1-6(2,3)4-5-10-11(7,8)9/h4-5H2,1-3H3,(H-,7,8,9) Key: YHHSONZFOIEMCP-UHFFFAOYSA-N; InChI=1/C5H14NO4P/c1-6(2,3)4-5-10-11(7,8)9/h4-5H2,1-3H3,(H-,7,8,9) Key: YHHSONZFOIEMCP-UHFFFAOYAD
- SMILES: C[N+](C)(C)CCOP(=O)(O)[O-]

Properties
Chemical formula	C_{5}H_{15}NO_{4}P
Molar mass	184.151 g/mol
- Except where otherwise noted, data are given for materials in their standard state (at 25 °C [77 °F], 100 kPa). verify (what is ?) Infobox references

Phosphocholine is an intermediate in the synthesis of phosphatidylcholine in tissues. Phosphocholine is made in a reaction, catalyzed by choline kinase, that converts ATP and choline into phosphocholine and ADP. Phosphocholine is a molecule found, for example, in lecithin.

In nematodes and human placentas, phosphocholine is selectively attached to other proteins as a posttranslational modification to suppress an immune response by their hosts.

It is also one of the binding targets of C-reactive protein (CRP). Thus, when a cell is damaged, CRP binds to phosphocholine, beginning the recognition and phagocytotic immunologic response.

Phosphocholine is a natural constituent of hens' eggs (and many other eggs) often used in biomimetic membrane studies.

== See also ==
- Alkylphosphocholines
- Choline
- Phosphoethanolamine
