= Phosphatidylcholine =

Class of phospholipids

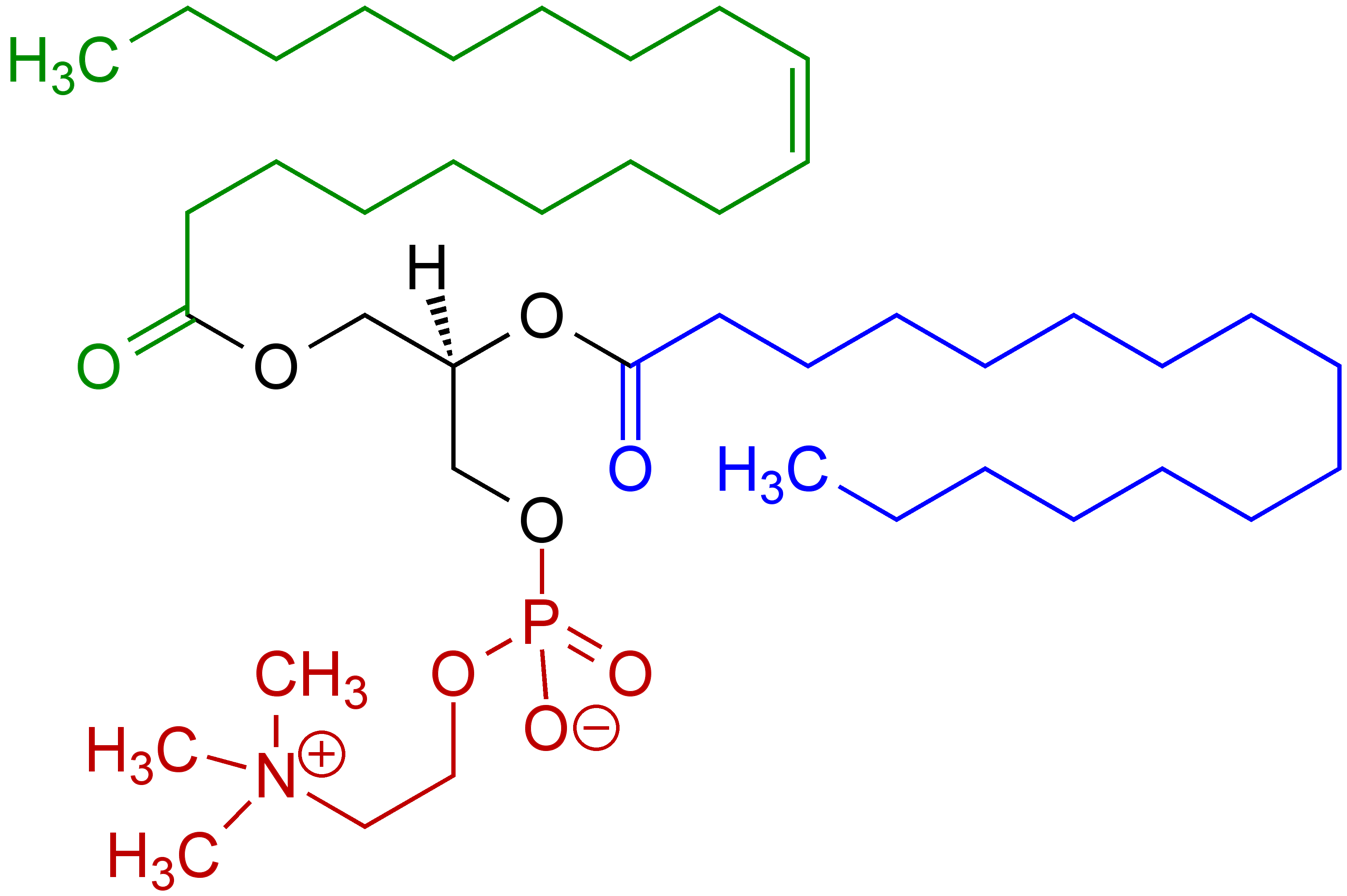
1-Oleoyl-2-palmitoyl-phosphatidylcholine

Phosphatidylcholines (PC) are a class of (glycero)phospholipids that incorporate choline within the headgroup. They are a major component of biological membranes and can easily be obtained from sources such as egg yolk or soybeans, from which they are mechanically or chemically extracted using hexane. They are a member of the lecithin group of yellow-brownish fatty substances occurring in animal and plant tissues. Dipalmitoylphosphatidylcholine is a major component of the pulmonary surfactant, and is often used in the lecithin–sphingomyelin ratio to calculate fetal lung maturity. While phosphatidylcholines are found in all plant and animal cells, they are absent in the membranes of most bacteria, including Escherichia coli. Purified phosphatidylcholine is produced commercially.

== Lecithin ==
The name lecithin was derived from Greek λέκιθος, lekithos 'egg yolk' by Theodore Nicolas Gobley, a French chemist and pharmacist of the mid-19th century, who applied it to the egg yolk phosphatidylcholine that he identified in 1847. Gobley eventually described lecithin from a chemical structural point of view, in 1874. Phosphatidylcholines are such a major component of lecithin that in some contexts the terms are used as synonyms. However, lecithin extracts consist of a mixture of phosphatidylcholine and other compounds. It is also used along with sodium taurocholate for simulating fed- and fasted-state biorelevant media in dissolution studies of highly lipophilic drugs.

== Function ==
Phosphatidylcholine is a major constituent of cell membranes and pulmonary surfactant, and is more commonly found in the exoplasmic or outer leaflet of a cell membrane. It is thought to be transported between membranes within the cell by phosphatidylcholine transfer protein (PCTP).

Phosphatidylcholine also plays a role in membrane-mediated cell signaling and PCTP activation of other enzymes.

== Structure and physical properties ==
Palmitoyl-oleyl-sn-phosphatidylcholine, a phosphatidylcholine

This phospholipid is composed of a choline head group and glycerophosphoric acid, with a variety of fatty acids. Usually, one is a saturated fatty acid (in the figure, this is palmitic acid (hexadecanoic acid, H_{3}C-(CH_{2})_{14}-COOH)); and the other is an unsaturated fatty acid (here oleic acid, or 9Z-octadecenoic acid, as in Gobley's original egg yolk lecithin). They can be found in disaturated species. Animal lung phosphatidylcholine, for example, contains a high proportion of dipalmitoylphosphatidylcholine.

Phospholipase D catalyzes the hydrolysis of phosphatidylcholine to form phosphatidic acid (PA), releasing the soluble choline headgroup into the cytosol.

== Possible health benefits ==
=== Senescence ===
A 2009 systematic review of clinical trials in humans found insufficient evidence to support supplementation of lecithin or phosphatidylcholine in dementia. The study found that a moderate benefit could not be ruled out without further large scale studies.

=== Lipolysis ===
Though phosphatidylcholine has been studied as an alternative to liposuction, no peer-reviewed study has shown it to have comparable effects. Injection of phosphatidylcholine in lipomas has been studied, with mixed results.

=== Ulcerative colitis ===
Treatment of ulcerative colitis with oral intake of phosphatidylcholine results in decreased disease activity.

== Biosynthesis ==
Although multiple pathways exist for biosynthesis, the predominant route in eukaryotes involves condensation between diacylglycerol (DAG) and cytidine 5'-diphosphocholine (CDP-choline or citicoline). The conversion is mediated by diacylglycerol cholinephosphotransferase. Another pathway, mainly operative in the liver involves methylation of phosphatidylethanolamine using S-adenosyl methionine (SAM) as the methyl group donor.

== Gallery ==
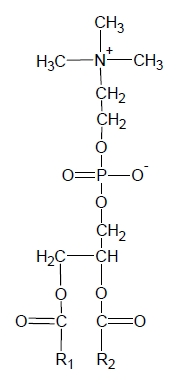
General structural formula of phosphatidylcholines

Membrane lipids

Choline metabolism

Phosphatidate

Choline

== See also ==
- CDP choline
- Lysophosphatidylcholine
- Phosphatidylserine
- Saturated fatty acid
- Unsaturated fatty acid
