= Phosphorylethanolamine =

Names
- Preferred IUPAC name 2-Aminoethyl dihydrogen phosphate
- Other names Phosphoethanolamine; PHOS

Identifiers
CAS Number	1071-23-4
3D model (JSmol)	Interactive image
ChEBI	CHEBI:17553
ChEMBL	ChEMBL146972
ChemSpider	990
DrugBank	DB01738
ECHA InfoCard	100.012.717
MeSH	phosphorylethanolamine
PubChem CID	1015
UNII	78A2BX7AEU
CompTox Dashboard (EPA)	DTXSID5061453
- InChI: InChI=1S/C2H8NO4P/c3-1-2-7-8(4,5)6/h1-3H2,(H2,4,5,6) Key: SUHOOTKUPISOBE-UHFFFAOYSA-N
- SMILES: C(COP(=O)(O)O)N

Properties
Chemical formula	C_{2}H_{8}NO_{4}P
Molar mass	141.063 g·mol^{−1}
Appearance	White powder
- Except where otherwise noted, data are given for materials in their standard state (at 25 °C [77 °F], 100 kPa). verify (what is ?) Infobox references

Phosphorylethanolamine or phosphoethanolamine is an ethanolamine derivative that is used to construct two different categories of phospholipids. One category termed a glycerophospholipid and the other a sphingomyelin, or more specifically within the sphingomyelin class, a sphingophospholipid. Phosphorylethanolamine is a polyprotic acid with two pKa values at 5.61 and 10.39.

Phosphorylethanolamine has been falsely promoted as a cancer treatment.

== Effectiveness ==
As a potential drug, phosphorylethanolamine has undergone human clinical trials. These were halted when no evidence of benefit was found.

Edzard Ernst has called phosphorylethanolamine "the most peculiar case of Brazilian quackery".

== Legality ==
There has been ongoing controversy and litigation in Brazil with regard to its use as a cancer treatment without approval by the National Health Surveillance Agency. For years, Gilberto Chierice, a Chemistry Professor at the São Carlos campus of the University of São Paulo, used resources from a campus laboratory to unofficially manufacture, distribute, and promote the drug to cancer patients without it having gone through clinical testing. In September 2015, university administrators began preventing the Professor from continuing with this practice. In October 2015, several courts in Brazil ruled in favor of plaintiffs who wanted the right to try the compound. However, a state court overturned the lower courts' decision a month later. Jailson Bittencourt de Andrade, secretary for Brazil's science and technology ministry, said the ministry plans to fund further research on the compound, but that it will be years before a determination can be made about phosphorylethanolamine's safety and efficacy in humans.

On April 14, 2016, a law was passed in Brazil allowing the use of synthetic phosphorylethanolamine for cancer treatment, despite opposition from the Brazilian Medical Association, the Brazilian Society of Clinical Oncology, and the regulatory agency Anvisa. However, shortly after, the country's Supreme Court suspended the law.

== Calcium salt ==
Calcium 2-aminoethylphosphate
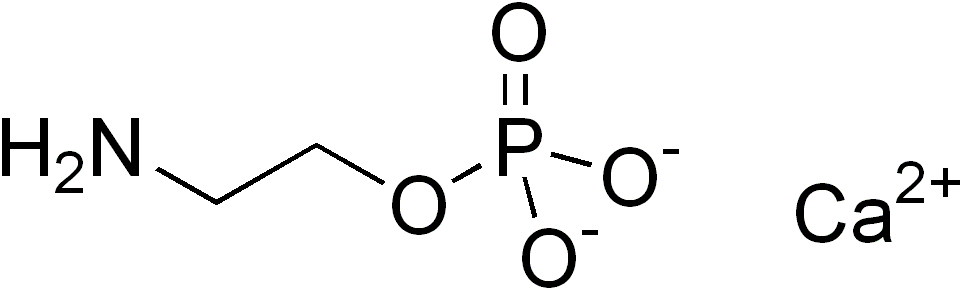

Names
- Preferred IUPAC name Calcium 2-aminoethyl phosphate

Identifiers
CAS Number	10389-08-9
3D model (JSmol)	Interactive image
ChemSpider	14508512
ECHA InfoCard	100.012.717
PubChem CID	19985431
UNII	Y68G4M097Y
CompTox Dashboard (EPA)	DTXSID5061453
- InChI: InChI=1S/C2H8NO4P.Ca/c3-1-2-7-8(4,5)6;/h1-3H2,(H2,4,5,6);/q;+2/p-2 Key: SYLKQIHLJRQWAY-UHFFFAOYSA-L
- SMILES: C(COP(=O)([O-])[O-])N.[Ca+2]

Properties
Chemical formula	C_{2}H_{6}CaNO_{4}P
Molar mass	179.13 g/mol
- Except where otherwise noted, data are given for materials in their standard state (at 25 °C [77 °F], 100 kPa). verify (what is ?) Infobox references

Calcium 2-aminoethylphosphate (Ca-AEP or Ca-2AEP) is a compound discovered by the biochemist Erwin Chargaff in 1941. It is the calcium salt of phosphorylethanolamine. It was patented by Hans Alfred Nieper and Franz Kohler.

=== Terminology and glossary ===
Calcium 2-amino ethyl phosphoric acid (Ca-AEP or Ca-2AEP) is also called calcium ethylamino-phosphate (calcium EAP), calcium colamine phosphate, calcium 2-aminoethyl ester of phosphoric acid, and calcium 2-amino ethanol phosphate

2-AEP plays a role as a component in the cell membrane and at the same time has the property to form complexes with minerals. This mineral transporter goes into the outer layer of the outer cell membrane where it releases its associated mineral and is itself metabolized with the structure of the cell membrane.

=== History, treatments, uses, and risks ===
Ca-AEP was discovered by Erwin Chargaff in 1953.

According to the U.S. National Multiple Sclerosis Society Calcium EAP is often promoted as a cure or therapy for Multiple Sclerosis and many other diseases. However, it states that it is not recommended by its medical advisory board, and also notes that the Food and Drug Administration has classified it as unsafe and unapproved for use.

Calcium 2-AEP is manufactured by numerous nutraceutical companies and is sold online and in health food stores.

== See also ==
- Phosphocholine
- Phosphoserine
- Lipid A phosphoethanolamine transferase
- MCR-1

== Additional images ==
Phosphate

Ethanolamine
