= Cytidine monophosphate =

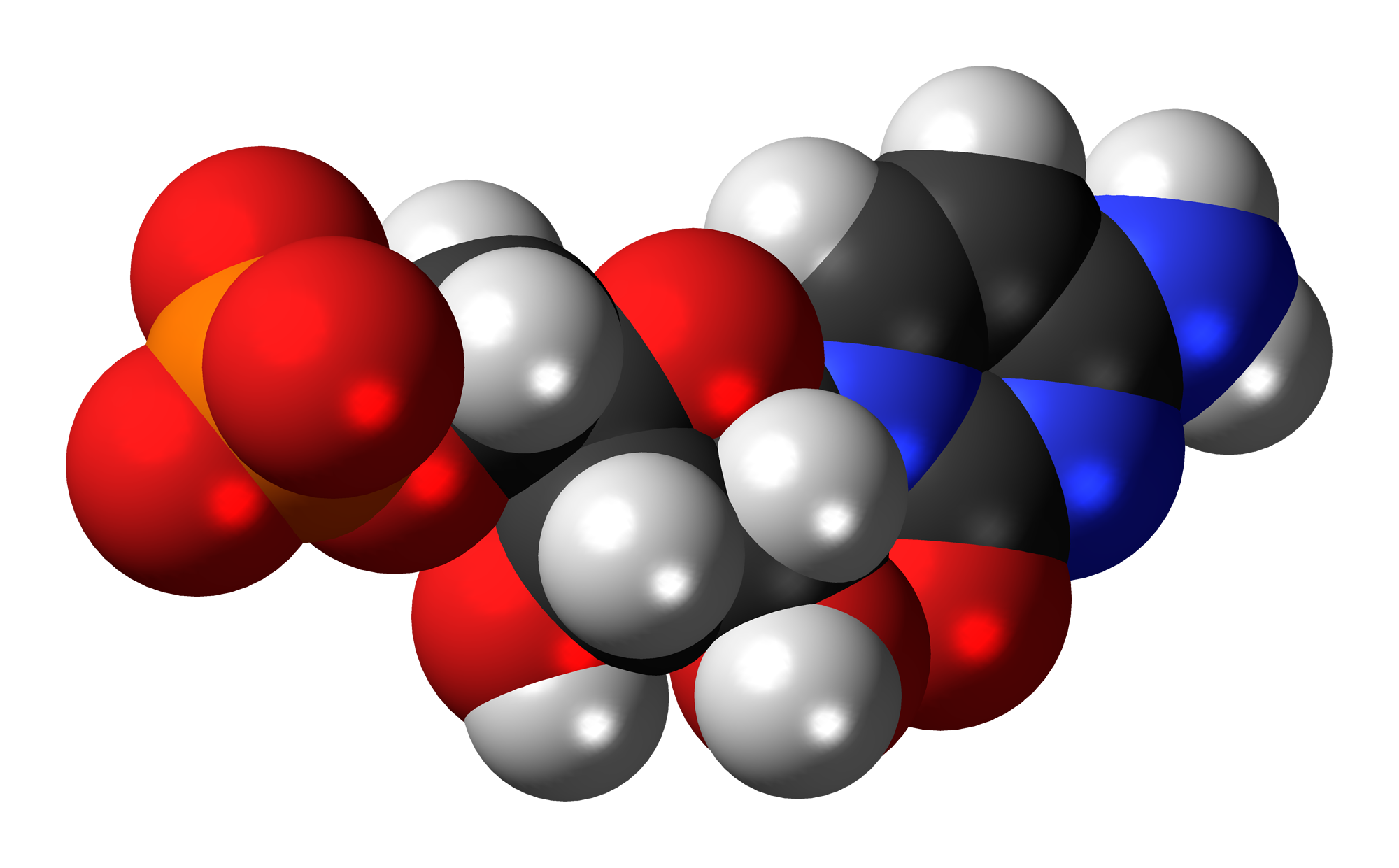

Names
- IUPAC name 5′-Cytidylic acid
- Systematic IUPAC name [(2R,3S,4R,5R)-5-(4-Amino-2-oxopyrimidin-1(2H)-yl)-3,4-dihydroxyoxolan-2-yl]methyl dihydrogen phosphate
- Other names Cytidylic acid; 5'-Cytidylic acid; Cytidine 5'-monophosphate; Cytidine 5'-phosphate; Cytidylate; 5'-CMP

Identifiers
CAS Number	63-37-6
3D model (JSmol)	Interactive image
ChEBI	CHEBI:17361
ChEMBL	ChEMBL307679
ChemSpider	5901
ECHA InfoCard	100.000.506
PubChem CID	6131
UNII	F469818O25
CompTox Dashboard (EPA)	DTXSID50889322
- InChI: InChI=1S/C9H14N3O8P/c10-5-1-2-12(9(15)11-5)8-7(14)6(13)4(20-8)3-19-21(16,17)18/h1-2,4,6-8,13-14H,3H2,(H2,10,11,15)(H2,16,17,18)/t4-,6-,7-,8-/m1/s1 Key: IERHLVCPSMICTF-XVFCMESISA-N
- SMILES: c1cn(c(=O)nc1N)[C@H]2[C@@H]([C@@H]([C@H](O2)COP(=O)(O)O)O)O

Properties
Chemical formula	C_{9}H_{14}N_{3}O_{8}P
Molar mass	323.198 g·mol^{−1}
Acidity (pK_{a})	0.8, 4.5, 6.3
- Except where otherwise noted, data are given for materials in their standard state (at 25 °C [77 °F], 100 kPa). Infobox references

Cytidine monophosphate, also known as 5'-cytidylic acid or simply cytidylate, and abbreviated CMP, is a nucleotide that is used as a monomer in RNA. It is an ester of phosphoric acid with the nucleoside cytidine. CMP consists of the phosphate group, the pentose sugar ribose, and the nucleobase cytosine; hence, a ribonucleoside monophosphate. As a substituent it takes the form of the prefix cytidylyl-.

== Metabolism ==
CMP can be phosphorylated to cytidine diphosphate by the enzyme CMP kinase, with adenosine triphosphate or guanosine triphosphate donating the phosphate group. Since cytidine triphosphate is generated by amination of uridine triphosphate, the main source of CMP is from RNA being decomposed by RNAse.

== See also ==
- Deoxycytidine monophosphate
- Nucleoside
- Oligonucleotide
