= Aldehyde dehydrogenase (disambiguation) =

Aldehyde dehydrogenases are a group of enzymes that catalyse the oxidation of aldehydes.

Aldehyde dehydrogenase may also refer to:

- Aldehyde dehydrogenase (FAD-independent)
- Aldehyde dehydrogenase (NAD(P)^{+})
- Aldehyde dehydrogenase (NAD^{+})
- Aldehyde dehydrogenase (NADP^{+})
- Aldehyde dehydrogenase (pyrroloquinoline-quinone)
