= Choline =

Chemical compound and essential nutrient

- Choline cation skeletal formula

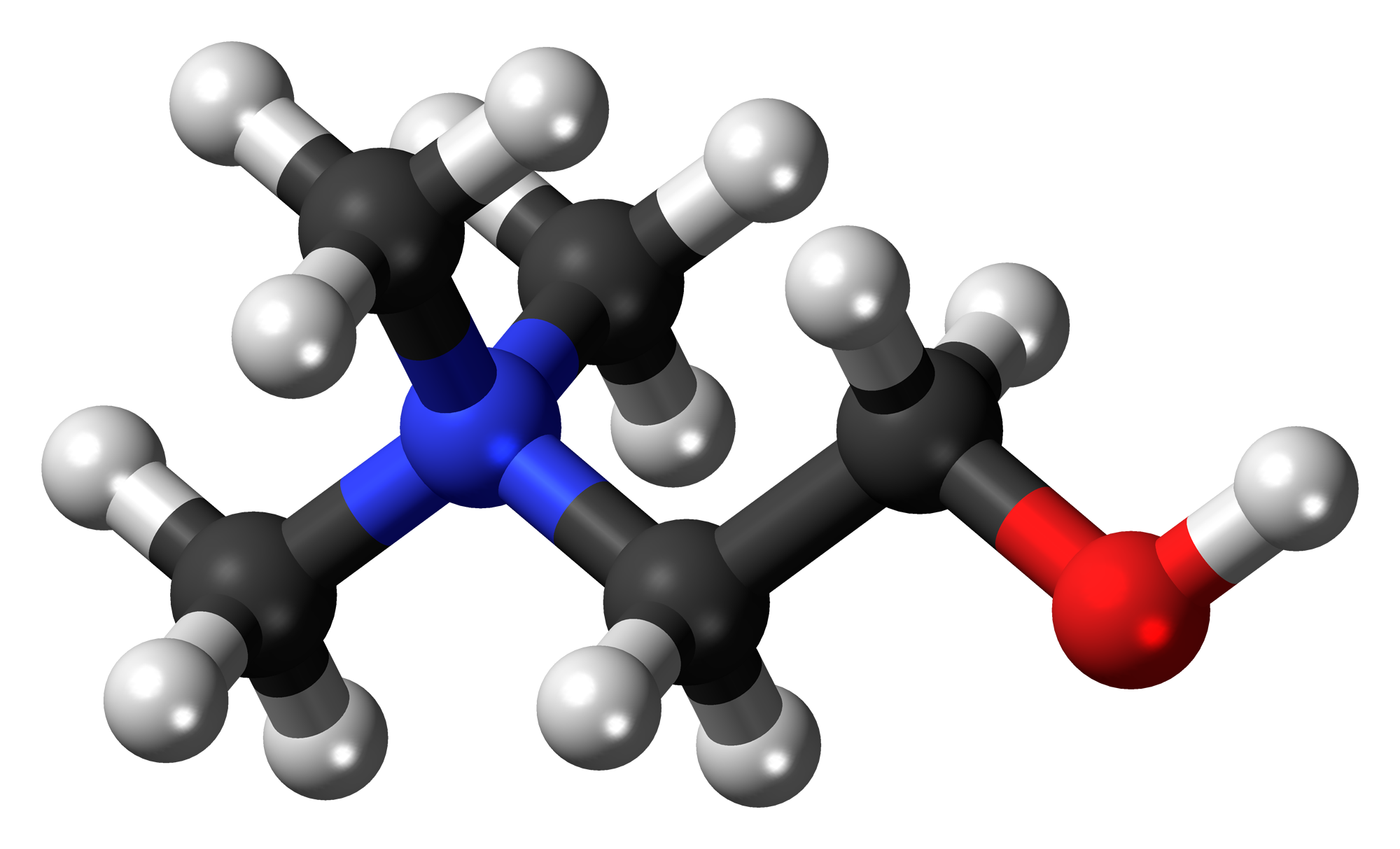

Names
Pronunciation	/ˈkoʊliːn/
- IUPAC name 2-Hydroxyethyl(trimethyl)azanium
- Preferred IUPAC name 2-Hydroxy-N,N,N-trimethylethan-1-aminium
- Other names: Bilineurine; (2-Hydroxyethyl)trimethylammonium; 2-Hydroxy-N,N,N-trimethylethanaminium

Identifiers
CAS Number	62-49-7
3D model (JSmol)	Interactive image
Beilstein Reference	1736748
ChEBI	CHEBI:15354
ChEMBL	ChEMBL920
ChemSpider	299
DrugBank	DB00122
ECHA InfoCard	100.000.487
EC Number	200-535-1
E number	E1001 (additional chemicals)
Gmelin Reference	324597
IUPHAR/BPS	4551
KEGG	C00114
PubChem CID	305
UNII	N91BDP6H0X
CompTox Dashboard (EPA)	DTXSID8043789
- InChI: InChI=1S/C5H14NO/c1-6(2,3)4-5-7/h7H,4-5H2,1-3H3/q+1 Key: OEYIOHPDSNJKLS-UHFFFAOYSA-N
- SMILES: C[N+](C)(C)CCO

Properties
Chemical formula	[(CH_{3})_{3}NCH_{2}CH_{2}OH]^{+}
Molar mass	104.173 g·mol^{−1}

Structure
Coordination geometry	Tetrahedral at the nitrogen atom

Hazards
- Occupational safety and health (OHS/OSH)
Main hazards	Corrosive
- GHS labelling
Pictograms	(GHS05: Corrosive)
Signal word	Danger
Hazard statements	H314
Precautionary statements	P260, P264, P280, P301+P330+P331, P303+P361+P353, P304+P340, P305+P351+P338, P310, P321, P363, P405, P501
NFPA 704 (fire diamond)	3 1 0 COR
- Lethal dose or concentration (LD, LC)
LD_{50} (median dose)	3–6 g/kg (rat, oral)
Safety data sheet (SDS)	4
- Except where otherwise noted, data are given for materials in their standard state (at 25 °C [77 °F], 100 kPa). verify (what is ?) Infobox references

Choline is a cation with the chemical formula [(CH_{3})_{3}NCH_{2}CH_{2}OH]^{+}. Choline forms various salts, such as choline chloride and choline bitartrate. An essential nutrient for animals, it is a structural component of phospholipids and cell membranes.

Choline is used to synthesize acetylcholine, a neurotransmitter involved in muscle control and numerous functions of the nervous system. Choline is involved in early development of the brain, gene expression, cell membrane signaling, and brain metabolism.

Although humans synthesize choline in the liver, the amount produced naturally is insufficient to meet cellular functions, requiring that some choline be obtained from foods or dietary supplements. Foods rich in choline include meats, poultry, eggs, fish, cruciferous vegetables, and beans. Choline is present in breast milk and is commonly added to infant formulas.

== Chemistry ==
Choline is a quaternary ammonium cation. The cholines are a family of water-soluble quaternary ammonium compounds. Choline is the parent compound of the choline class, consisting of an ethanolamine residue having three methyl groups attached to the same nitrogen atom. Choline hydroxide is known as choline base. It is hygroscopic and thus often encountered as a colorless viscous hydrated syrup that smells of trimethylamine (TMA). It is stable in dilute solutions, but in concentrated solutions tends to decompose at 100°C, giving ethylene glycol, polyethylene glycols, and TMA.

Choline chloride can be prepared by treating TMA with 2-chloroethanol:

(CH_{3})_{3}N + ClCH_{2}CH_{2}OH → [(CH_{3})_{3}NCH_{2}CH_{2}OH]^{+}Cl^{−}

Choline has historically been produced from natural sources, such as via the hydrolysis of lecithin.

== Choline as a nutrient ==
Choline is widespread in living beings. In most animals, choline phospholipids are necessary components in cell membranes, in the membranes of cell organelles, and in very low-density lipoproteins.

Choline is an essential nutrient for humans and many other animals. Humans are capable of some de novo synthesis of choline but require additional choline in the diet to maintain health. Dietary requirements can be met by choline by itself or in the form of choline phospholipids, such as phosphatidylcholine. Choline is not formally classified as a vitamin despite being an essential nutrient with an amino acid–like structure and metabolism.

Choline is required to produce acetylcholine – a neurotransmitter – and S-adenosylmethionine (SAM), a universal methyl donor. Upon methylation SAM is transformed into S-adenosyl homocysteine.

Symptomatic choline deficiency causes non-alcoholic fatty liver disease and muscle damage. Excessive consumption of choline (greater than 7.5 grams per day) can cause low blood pressure, sweating, diarrhea, and fish-like body smell due to trimethylamine, which forms in the metabolism of choline. Rich dietary sources of choline and choline phospholipids include liver, egg yolks, dairy products, peanuts, certain beans, nuts and seeds.

== Metabolism ==
=== Biosynthesis ===
Biosynthesis of choline in plants

In plants, the first step in de novo biosynthesis of choline is the decarboxylation of serine into ethanolamine, which is catalyzed by a serine decarboxylase. The synthesis of choline from ethanolamine may take place in three parallel pathways, where three consecutive N-methylation steps catalyzed by a methyl transferase are carried out on either the free-base, phospho-bases, or phosphatidyl-bases. The source of the methyl group is S-adenosyl-L-methionine and S-adenosyl-L-homocysteine is generated as a side product.

Main pathways of choline (Chol) metabolism, synthesis and excretion. Click for details. Some of the abbreviations are used in this section.

In humans and most other animals, de novo synthesis of choline proceeds via the phosphatidylethanolamine N-methyltransferase (PEMT) pathway, but biosynthesis is not enough to meet human requirements. In the hepatic PEMT route, 3-phosphoglycerate (3PG) receives 2 acyl groups from acyl-CoA forming a phosphatidic acid. It reacts with cytidine triphosphate to form cytidine diphosphate-diacylglycerol. Its hydroxyl group reacts with serine to form phosphatidylserine, which decarboxylates to ethanolamine and phosphatidylethanolamine (PE) forms. A PEMT enzyme moves three methyl groups from three S-adenosyl methionines (SAM) donors to the ethanolamine group of the phosphatidylethanolamine to form choline in the form of phosphatidylcholine. Three S-adenosylhomocysteines (SAHs) are formed as a byproduct.

Choline can also be released from more complex precursors. For example, phosphatidylcholines (PC) can be hydrolyzed to choline (Chol) in most cell types. The CDP-choline route can also produce choline: cytosolic choline kinases (CK) phosphorylate choline with ATP to phosphocholine (PChol). This happens in some cell types like liver and kidney. Choline-phosphate cytidylyltransferases (CPCT) convert PChol to CDP-choline (CDP-Chol) with cytidine triphosphate (CTP). CDP-choline and diglyceride are transformed to PC by diacylglycerol cholinephosphotransferase (CPT).

In humans, certain PEMT-enzyme mutations and estrogen deficiency (often due to menopause) increase the dietary need for choline. In rodents, 70% of phosphatidylcholines are formed via the PEMT route and only 30% via the CDP-choline route. In knockout mice, PEMT inactivation makes them completely dependent on dietary choline.

=== Absorption ===
In humans, choline is absorbed from the intestines via the SLC44A1 (CTL1) membrane protein by facilitated diffusion governed by the choline concentration gradient and the electrical potential across the enterocyte membranes. SLC44A1 has limited ability to transport choline: at high concentrations, some of it remains unabsorbed. Absorbed choline leaves the enterocytes via the portal vein, passes the liver, and enters systemic circulation. Gut microbes degrade the unabsorbed choline to trimethylamine, which is oxidized in the liver to trimethylamine N-oxide.

Phosphocholine and glycerophosphocholines are hydrolyzed via phospholipases to choline, which enters the portal vein. Due to their water solubility, some of them escape unchanged to the portal vein. Fat-soluble choline-containing compounds (phosphatidylcholines and sphingomyelins) are either hydrolyzed by phospholipases or enter the lymph incorporated into chylomicrons.

=== Transport ===
In humans, choline is transported as a free ion in blood. Choline–containing phospholipids and other substances, like glycerophosphocholines, are transported in blood lipoproteins. Blood plasma choline levels in healthy fasting adults is 7–20 micromoles per liter (μmol/L) and 10 μmol/L on average. Levels are regulated, but choline intake and deficiency can alter them. Levels are elevated for about 3 hours after choline consumption. Phosphatidylcholine levels in the plasma of fasting adults are 1.5–2.5 mmol/L. Its consumption elevates free choline levels for about 8–12 hours but does not significantly affect phosphatidylcholine levels.

Choline is a water-soluble ion and thus requires transporters to pass through fat-soluble cell membranes. Three types of choline transporters are known:

- SLC5A7
- CTLs: CTL1 (SLC44A1), CTL2 (SLC44A2) and CTL4 (SLC44A4)
- OCTs: OCT1 (SLC22A1) and OCT2 (SLC22A2)

SLC5A7s are sodium- (Na^{+}) and ATP-dependent transporters. They have high binding affinity for choline, transport it primarily to neurons and are indirectly associated with the acetylcholine production. Their deficient function causes hereditary weakness in the pulmonary and other muscles in humans due to acetylcholine deficiency. In knockout mice, their dysfunction results easily in death with cyanosis and paralysis.

CTL1s have moderate affinity for choline and transport it in almost all tissues, including the intestines, liver, kidneys, placenta, and mitochondria. CTL1s supply choline for phosphatidylcholine and trimethylglycine production. CTL2s occur, especially in the mitochondria in the tongue, kidneys, muscles, and heart. They are associated with the mitochondrial oxidation of choline to trimethylglycine. CTL1s and CTL2s are not associated with acetylcholine production, but transport choline together via the blood–brain barrier. Only CTL2s occur on the brain side of the barrier. They also remove excess choline from neurons and return it to the blood. CTL1s occur only on the blood side of the barrier, but also on the membranes of astrocytes and neurons.

OCT1s and OCT2s are not associated with acetylcholine production. They transport choline with low affinity. OCT1s transport choline primarily in the liver and kidneys, while OCT2s transport choline in the kidneys and the brain.

=== Storage ===
Choline is stored in the cell membranes and organelles as phospholipids, and inside cells as phosphatidylcholines and glycerophosphocholines.

=== Excretion ===
Even at choline doses of 2–8 g, little choline is excreted into urine in humans. Excretion happens via transporters that occur within the kidneys (see transport). Trimethylglycine is demethylated in the liver and kidneys to dimethylglycine (tetrahydrofolate receives one of the methyl groups). Methylglycine forms are excreted into urine or are demethylated to glycine.

== Function ==
Choline and its derivatives have many biological functions. Notably, choline serves as a precursor for other essential cell components and signaling molecules, such as phospholipids that form cell membranes, the neurotransmitter acetylcholine, and the osmoregulator trimethylglycine (betaine). Trimethylglycine in turn serves as a source of methyl groups by participating in the biosynthesis of S-adenosylmethionine.

=== Phospholipid precursor ===
Choline is converted into diverse phospholipids, like phosphatidylcholines and sphingomyelins. These are found in all cell membranes and the membranes of most cell organelles. Phosphatidylcholines are a structurally important part of cell membranes. In humans, 40–50% of their phospholipids are phosphatidylcholines.

Choline phospholipids also form lipid rafts in the cell membranes along with cholesterol. The rafts are centers, for example for cholinergic receptors and receptor signal transduction enzymes.

Phosphatidylcholines are needed for the synthesis of VLDLs: 70–95% of their phospholipids are phosphatidylcholines in humans.

Choline is also needed for the synthesis of pulmonary surfactant, which is a mixture consisting mostly of phosphatidylcholines. The surfactant is responsible for lung elasticity, that is, for the lung tissue's ability to contract and expand. For example, deficiency of phosphatidylcholines in the lung tissues has been linked to acute respiratory distress syndrome.

Phosphatidylcholines are excreted into bile and work together with bile acid salts as surfactants in it, thus helping with the intestinal absorption of lipids.

=== Acetylcholine synthesis ===
Choline is a precursor to acetylcholine, a neurotransmitter that plays a necessary role in muscle contraction, memory, and neural development. Nonetheless, there is little acetylcholine in the human body relative to other forms of choline. Neurons also store choline as phospholipids in their cell membranes for the production of acetylcholine.

=== Source of trimethylglycine ===
In humans, choline is oxidized irreversibly in liver mitochondria to glycine betaine aldehyde by choline oxidases. This is oxidized by mitochondrial or cytosolic betaine-aldehyde dehydrogenases to trimethylglycine. Trimethylglycine is a necessary osmoregulator. It also acts as a substrate for the BHMT enzyme, which methylates homocysteine to methionine. This is a S-adenosylmethionine (SAM) precursor. SAM is a common reagent in biological methylation reactions. For example, it methylates guanidines of DNA and certain lysines of histones. Thus, it is part of gene expression and epigenetic regulation. Choline deficiency thus leads to elevated homocysteine levels and decreased SAM levels in blood.

== Content in foods ==
Choline occurs in foods as a free cation and phospholipids, especially as phosphatidylcholines. Choline is highest in organ meats and egg yolks, though it is found to a lesser degree in non-organ meats, grains, vegetables, fruit, and dairy products. Cooking oils and other food fats have about 5 mg/100 g of total choline. In the United States, food labels express the amount of choline in a serving as a percentage of Daily Value (%DV) based on the Adequate Intake of 550 mg/day. 100% of the daily value means that a serving of food has 550 mg of choline. "Total choline" is defined as the sum of free choline and choline-containing phospholipids, without accounting for mass fraction.

Human breast milk is rich in choline. Exclusive breastfeeding corresponds to about 120 mg of choline per day for the baby. An increase in a mother's choline intake raises the choline content of breast milk, and a low intake decreases it. Infant formulas may or may not contain enough choline. In the EU and the US, it is mandatory to add at least 7 mg of choline per 100 kilocalories (kcal) to every infant formula. In the EU, levels above 50 mg/100 kcal are not allowed.

Trimethylglycine is a functional metabolite of choline. It substitutes for choline nutritionally, but only partially. High amounts of trimethylglycine occur in wheat bran (1,339 mg/100 g), toasted wheat germ (1,240 mg/100 g) and spinach (600–645 mg/100 g), for example.

Choline content of foods (mg/100 g) (Note: Foods are raw unless noted otherwise. Contents are "total choline" as defined above.)
Meats		Vegetables	
Bacon, cooked	124.89	Bean, snap	13.46
Beef, trim-cut, cooked	78.15	Beetroot	6.01
Beef liver, pan fried	418.22	Broccoli	40.06
Chicken, roasted, with skin	65.83	Brussels sprout	40.61
Chicken, roasted, no skin	78.74	Cabbage	15.45
Chicken liver	290.03	Carrot	8.79
Cod, atlantic	83.63	Cauliflower	39.10
Ground beef, 75–85% lean, broiled	79.32–82.35	Sweetcorn, yellow	21.95
Pork loin cooked	102.76	Cucumber	5.95
Shrimp, canned	70.60	Lettuce, iceberg	6.70
Dairy products (cow)		Lettuce, romaine	9.92
Butter, salted	18.77	Pea	27.51
Cheese	16.50–27.21	Sauerkraut	10.39
Cottage cheese	18.42	Spinach	22.08
Milk, whole/skimmed	14.29–16.40	Sweet potato	13.11
Sour cream	20.33	Tomato	6.74
Yogurt, plain	15.20	Zucchini	9.36
Grains		Fruits	
Oat bran, raw	58.57	Apple	3.44
Oats, plain	7.42	Avocado	14.18
Rice, white	2.08	Banana	9.76
Rice, brown	9.22	Blueberry	6.04
Wheat bran	74.39	Cantaloupe	7.58
Wheat germ, toasted	152.08	Grape	7.53
Others		Grapefruit	5.63
Bean, navy	26.93	Orange	8.38
Egg, chicken	251.00	Peach	6.10
Olive oil	0.29	Pear	5.11
Peanut	52.47	Prune	9.66
Soybean, raw	115.87	Strawberry	5.65
Tofu, soft	27.37	Watermelon	4.07

=== Daily values ===
The following table contains updated choline sources to reflect the new Daily Value and the new Nutrition Facts and Supplement Facts Labels. It reflects data from the U.S. Department of Agriculture, Agricultural Research Service. FoodData Central, 2019.

Selected food sources of choline
Food	Milligrams (mg) per serving	Percent DV*
Beef liver, pan fried, 3 oz (85 g)	356	65
Egg, hard-boiled, 1 large egg	147	27
Beef top round, separable lean only, braised, 3 oz (85 g)	117	21
Soybeans, roasted, 1/2 cup (~120 mL)	107	19
Chicken breast, roasted, 3 oz (85 g)	72	13
Beef, ground, 93% lean meat, broiled, 3 oz (85 g)	72	13
Cod, Atlantic, cooked, dry heat, 3 oz (85 g)	71	13
Mushrooms, shiitake, cooked, 1/2 cup (~120 mL) pieces	58	11
Potatoes, red, baked, flesh and skin, 1 large potato	57	10
Wheat germ, toasted, 1 oz (28 g)	51	9
Beans, kidney, canned, 1/2 cup (~120 mL)	45	8
Quinoa, cooked, 1 cup (~240 mL)	43	8
Milk, 1% fat, 1 cup (~240 mL)	43	8
Yogurt, vanilla, nonfat, 1 cup (~240 mL)	38	7
Brussels sprouts, boiled, 1/2 cup (~120 mL)	32	6
Broccoli, chopped, boiled, drained, 1/2 cup (~120 mL)	31	6
Cottage cheese, nonfat, 1 cup (~240 mL)	26	5
Tuna, white, canned in water, drained in solids, 3 oz (85 g)	25	5
Peanuts, dry roasted, 1/4 cup (~60 mL)	24	4
Cauliflower, 1 in (2.5 cm) pieces, boiled, drained, 1/2 cup (~120 mL)	24	4
Peas, green, boiled, 1/2 cup (~120 mL)	24	4
Sunflower seeds, oil roasted, 1/4 cup (~60 mL)	19	3
Rice, brown, long-grain, cooked, 1 cup (~240 mL)	19	3
Bread, pita, whole wheat, 1 large (6 1/2 in or 17 cm diameter)	17	3
Cabbage, boiled, 1/2 cup (~120 mL)	15	3
Tangerine (mandarin orange), sections, 1/2 cup (~120 mL)	10	2
Beans, snap, raw, 1/2 cup (~120 mL)	8	1
Kiwifruit, raw, 1/2 cup (~120 mL) sliced	7	1
Carrots, raw, chopped, 1/2 cup (~120 mL)	6	1
Apples, raw, with skin, quartered or chopped, 1/2 cup (~120 mL)	2	0

DV = Daily Value. The U.S. Food and Drug Administration (FDA) developed DVs to help consumers compare the nutrient contents of foods and dietary supplements within the context of a total diet. The DV for choline is 550 mg for adults and children ages 4 and older. The FDA does not require food labels to list choline content unless choline has been added to the food. Foods providing 20% or more of the DV are considered to be high sources of a nutrient, but foods providing lower percentages of the DV also contribute to a healthful diet.

The U.S. Department of Agriculture's (USDA's) FoodData Central lists the nutrient content of many foods and provides a comprehensive list of foods containing choline arranged by nutrient content.

== Dietary recommendations ==
Insufficient data is available to establish an estimated average requirement (EAR) for choline, so the Food and Nutrition Board established adequate intakes (AIs). For adults, the AI for choline was set at 550 mg/day for men and 425 mg/day for women. These values have been shown to prevent hepatic alteration in men. However, the study used to derive these values did not evaluate whether lower choline intake would be effective, as researchers only compared a choline-free diet to a diet containing 550 mg of choline per day. From this, the AIs for children and adolescents were extrapolated.

Recommendations are in milligrams per day (mg/day). The European Food Safety Authority (EFSA) recommendations are general recommendations for the EU countries. The EFSA has not set any upper limits for intake. Individual EU countries may have more specific recommendations. The National Academy of Medicine (NAM) recommendations apply in the United States, Australia, and New Zealand.

Choline recommendations (mg/day)
Age	EFSA adequate intake	US NAM adequate intake	US NAM tolerable upper intake levels
Infants and children
0–6 months	Not established	125	Not established
7–12 months	160	150	Not established
1–3 years	140	200	1,000
4–6 years	170	250	1,000
7–8 years	250	250	1,000
9–10 years	250	375	1,000
11–13 years	340	375	2,000
Males
14 years	340	550	3,000
15–18 years	400	550	3,000
19+ years	400	550	3,500
Females
14 years	340	400	3,000
15–18 years	400	400	3,000
19+ y	400	425	3,500
If pregnant	480	450	3,500 (3,000 if ≤18 y)
If breastfeeding	520	550	3,500 (3,000 if ≤18 y)

== Intake in populations ==
Twelve surveys conducted in 9 EU countries between 2000 and 2011 estimated choline intake of adults in these countries to be 269–468 milligrams per day. Intake was 269–444 mg/day in adult women and 332–468 mg/day in adult men. Intake was 75–127 mg/day in infants, 151–210 mg/day in 1- to 3-year-olds, 177–304 mg/day in 3- to 10-year-olds, and 244–373 mg/day in 10- to 18-year-olds. The total choline intake mean estimate was 336 mg/day in pregnant adolescents and 356 mg/day in pregnant women.

A study based on the NHANES 2009–2012 survey estimated the choline intake to be too low in some US subpopulations. Intake was 315.2–318.8 mg/d in 2+ year olds during this period. Out of 2+ year olds, only 15.6±0.8% of males and 6.1±0.6% of females exceeded the adequate intake (AI). AI was exceeded by 62.9±3.1% of 2- to 3-year-olds, 45.4±1.6% of 4- to 8-year-olds, 9.0±1.0% of 9- to 13-year-olds, 1.8±0.4% of 14–18 and 6.6±0.5% of 19+ year olds. The upper intake level was not exceeded in any subpopulations.

A 2013–2014 NHANES study of the US population found the choline intake of 2- to 19-year-olds to be 256±3.8 mg/day and 339±3.9 mg/day in adults 20 and over. Intake was 402±6.1 mg/d in men 20 and over and 278 mg/d in women 20 and over.

== Deficiency ==
=== Signs and symptoms ===
Symptomatic choline deficiency is rare in humans. Most obtain sufficient amounts of it from the diet and can biosynthesize limited amounts of it via PEMT. Symptomatic deficiency is often caused by certain diseases or by other indirect causes. Severe deficiency causes muscle damage and non-alcoholic fatty liver disease, which may develop into cirrhosis.

In other animals, fatty liver is also a typical sign of choline deficiency. Bleeding in the kidneys can also occur in some species. This is suspected to be due to a deficiency of choline-derived trimethylglycine, which functions as an osmoregulator.

=== Causes and mechanisms ===
Estrogen production is a relevant factor that predisposes individuals to deficiency, along with low dietary choline intake. Estrogens activate phosphatidylcholine-producing PEMT enzymes. Women before menopause have a lower dietary need for choline than men due to women's higher estrogen production. Without estrogen therapy, the choline needs of post-menopausal women are similar to men's. Some single-nucleotide polymorphisms (genetic factors) affecting choline and folate metabolism are also relevant. Certain gut microbes also degrade choline more efficiently than others, so they are also relevant.

In deficiency, the availability of phosphatidylcholines in the liver is decreased – these are needed for the formation of VLDLs. Thus, VLDL-mediated fatty acid transport out of the liver decreases, leading to fat accumulation in the liver. Other simultaneously occurring mechanisms explaining the observed liver damage have also been suggested. For example, choline phospholipids are also needed in mitochondrial membranes. Their unavailability impairs mitochondrial membranes' ability to maintain proper electrochemical gradient, which, among other things, is needed for degrading fatty acids via β-oxidation. Fat metabolism within the liver therefore decreases.

== Excess intake ==
Excessive doses of choline can have adverse effects. Daily 8–20 g doses of choline, for example, have been found to cause low blood pressure, nausea, diarrhea, and fish-like body odor. The odor is due to trimethylamine (TMA) formed by the gut microbes from the unabsorbed choline (see trimethylaminuria).

The liver oxidizes TMA to trimethylamine N-oxide (TMAO). Elevated levels of TMA and TMAO in the body have been linked to increased risk of atherosclerosis and mortality. Thus, excessive choline intake has been hypothesized to increase these risks in addition to carnitine, which is also formed into TMA and TMAO by gut bacteria. However, choline intake has not been shown to increase the risk of dying from cardiovascular diseases. It is plausible that elevated TMA and TMAO levels are just a symptom of other underlying illnesses or genetic factors that predispose individuals for increased mortality. Such factors may not have been properly accounted for in certain studies observing TMA and TMAO level-related mortality. Causality may be reversed or confounded, and large choline intake might not increase mortality in humans. For example, kidney dysfunction predisposes for cardiovascular diseases, but can also decrease TMA and TMAO excretion.

== Health effects ==
=== Neural tube closure ===
Low maternal choline intake is associated with an increased risk of neural tube defects (NTDs). Higher maternal intake of choline is likely associated with better neurocognition/neurodevelopment in children. Choline and folate, interacting with vitamin B_{12}, act as methyl donors to homocysteine to form methionine, which can then go on to form S-adenosylmethionine (SAM). SAM is the substrate for almost all methylation reactions in mammals. It has been suggested that disturbed methylation via SAM could be responsible for the relation between folate and NTDs. This may also apply to choline. Certain mutations that disturb choline metabolism increase the prevalence of NTDs in newborns, but the role of dietary choline deficiency remains unclear, as of 2015.

=== Cardiovascular diseases and cancer ===
Choline deficiency can cause fatty liver, which increases cancer and cardiovascular disease risk. Choline deficiency also decreases SAM production, which is involved in DNA methylation – this decrease may also contribute to carcinogenesis. Thus, deficiency and its association with such diseases have been studied. However, observational studies of free populations have not convincingly shown an association between low choline intake and cardiovascular diseases or most cancers. Studies on prostate cancer have been contradictory.

=== Cognition ===
Studies observing the effect of higher choline intake on cognition have been conducted in human adults, with contradictory results. Similar studies on human infants and children have been contradictory and also limited.

== Perinatal development ==
Both pregnancy and lactation dramatically increase the demand for choline. This demand may be met by upregulation of PEMT by increasing estrogen levels to produce more choline de novo, but even with increased PEMT activity, the demand for choline is still so high that bodily stores are generally depleted. This is exemplified by the observation that Pemt −/− mice (mice lacking functional PEMT) will abort at 9–10 days unless fed supplemental choline.

While maternal stores of choline are depleted during pregnancy and lactation, the placenta accumulates choline by pumping choline against the concentration gradient into the tissue, where it is then stored in various forms, mostly as acetylcholine. Choline concentrations in amniotic fluid can be ten times higher than in maternal blood.

=== Functions in the fetus ===
Choline is in high demand during pregnancy as a substrate for building cellular membranes (rapid fetal and mother tissue expansion), increased need for one-carbon moieties (a substrate for methylation of DNA and other functions), raising choline stores in fetal and placental tissues, and for increased production of lipoproteins (proteins containing "fat" portions). In particular, there is interest in the impact of choline consumption on the brain. This stems from choline's use as a material for making cellular membranes (particularly in making phosphatidylcholine). Human brain growth is most rapid during the third trimester of pregnancy and continues to be rapid until approximately five years of age. During this time, the demand is high for sphingomyelin, which is made from phosphatidylcholine (and thus from choline), because this material is used to myelinate (insulate) nerve fibers. Choline is also in demand for the production of the neurotransmitter acetylcholine, which can influence the structure and organization of brain regions, neurogenesis, myelination, and synapse formation. Acetylcholine is even present in the placenta and may help control cell proliferation and differentiation (increases in cell number and changes of multiuse cells into dedicated cellular functions) and parturition.

Choline uptake into the brain is controlled by a low-affinity transporter located at the blood–brain barrier. Transport occurs when arterial blood plasma choline concentrations increase above 14 μmol/L, which can occur during a spike in choline concentration after consuming choline-rich foods. Neurons, conversely, acquire choline by both high- and low-affinity transporters. Choline is stored as membrane-bound phosphatidylcholine, which can later be used for acetylcholine synthesis. Acetylcholine is formed as needed, travels across the synapse, and transmits the signal to the following neuron. Afterwards, acetylcholinesterase degrades it, and the free choline is taken up by a high-affinity transporter into the neuron again.

== Uses ==
Choline chloride and choline bitartrate are used in dietary supplements. Bitartrate is used more often due to its lower hygroscopicity. Certain choline salts are used to supplement chicken, turkey, and some other animal feeds. Some salts are also used as industrial chemicals: for example, in photolithography to remove photoresist. Choline theophyllinate and choline salicylate are used as medicines, as well as structural analogs, like methacholine and carbachol. Radiolabeled cholines, like ^{11}C-choline, are used in medical imaging. Other commercially used salts include tricholine citrate and choline bicarbonate.

The most common forms of dietary choline supplements are shown in the following table:

Supplement	weight (g/mol)	Choline content (%)
Alpha-GPC (Choline alfoscerate)	257.22	40.5%
Choline bitartrate	253.25	41.13
Choline citrate	295.29	35.28%
Citicoline (CDP-choline)	488.32	21.33%
Phosphatidylcholine (PC)	Varies	14-29%
Soy lecithin (12.69%–16.7% Phosphatidylcholine)	-	1.67% – 2.20%

== History ==
=== Discovery ===
In 1849, Adolph Strecker was the first to isolate choline from pig bile. In 1852, L. Babo and M. Hirschbrunn extracted choline from white mustard seeds and named it sinkaline. In 1862, Strecker repeated his experiment with pig and ox bile, calling the substance choline for the first time after the Greek word for bile, chole, and identifying it with the chemical formula C_{5}H_{13}NO. In 1850, Theodore Nicolas Gobley extracted from the brains and roe of carps a substance he named lecithin after the Greek word for egg yolk, lekithos, showing in 1874 that it was a mixture of phosphatidylcholines.

In 1865, Oscar Liebreich isolated "neurine" from animal brains. The structural formulas of acetylcholine and Liebreich's "neurine" were resolved by Adolf von Baeyer in 1867. Later that year "neurine" and sinkaline were shown to be the same substances as Strecker's choline. Thus, Bayer was the first to resolve the structure of choline. The compound now known as neurine is unrelated to choline.

=== Discovery as a nutrient ===
In the early 1930s, Charles Best and colleagues noted that fatty liver in rats on a special diet and diabetic dogs could be prevented by feeding them lecithin, proving in 1932 that choline in lecithin was solely responsible for this preventive effect. In 1998, the US National Academy of Medicine reported its first recommendations for choline in the human diet.
