= Remethylation =

Remethylation involves methylation that occurs in some biochemical cycles. Often methyl groups are not mobile when attached to nitrogen and sulfur, but the removal and reinstallation of methyl groups does occur with the assistance of certain enzymes.

== Homocysteine-methionine interconversion ==
Homocysteine (left) and methionine (right) are related by demethylation and remethylation.

Remethylation is a major step in the conversion of homocysteine to the essential amino acid methionine. The remethylation process involves the enzyme methionine synthase (MS), which requires vitamin B_{12} as a cofactor, and also depends indirectly on folate and other B vitamins. A second pathway, which is usually restricted to liver and kidney in most mammals, involves betaine-homocysteine methyltransferase (BHMT) and requires trimethylglycine as a cofactor.

== DNA processing and epigenetics ==
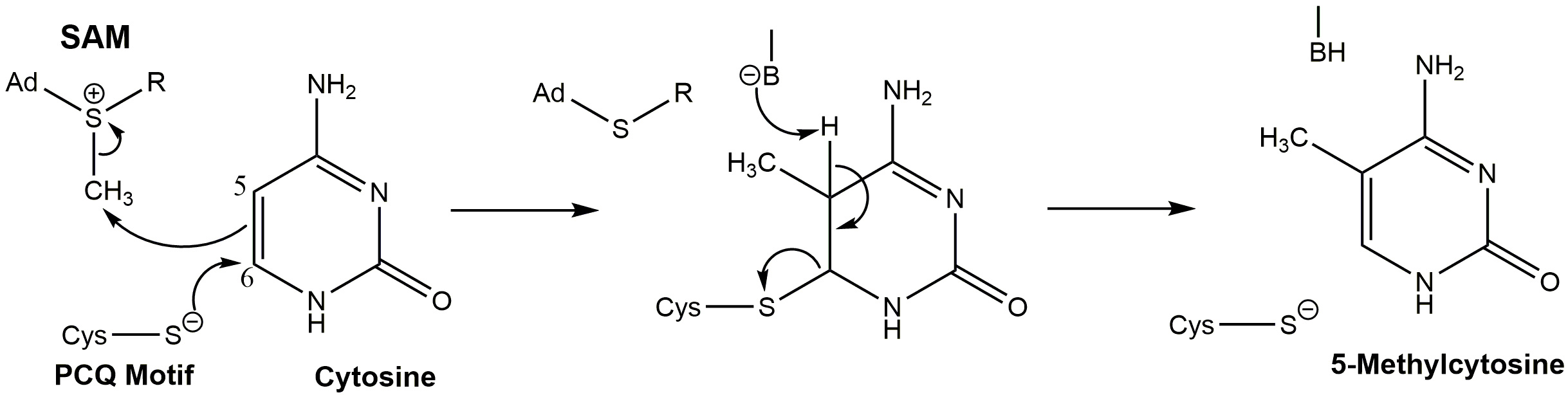
Remethylation of cytosine to give 5-methylcytosine.

Remethylation also has a role in epigenetics and neuroplasticity. DNA methylation patterns are largely erased and then re-established (remethylated) between generations in mammals. Almost all of the methylations from the parents are erased, first during gametogenesis, and again in early embryogenesis, with demethylation and remethylation occurring each time. Demethylation in early embryogenesis occurs in the preimplantation period in two stages – initially in the zygote, then during the first few embryonic replication cycles of morula and blastula. A wave of methylation then takes place during the implantation stage of the embryo, with CpG islands protected from methylation. This results in global repression and allows housekeeping genes to be expressed in all cells. In the post-implantation stage, methylation patterns are stage- and tissue-specific, with changes that would define each individual cell type lasting stably over a long period.
