= Choline oxidase =

Class of enzymes

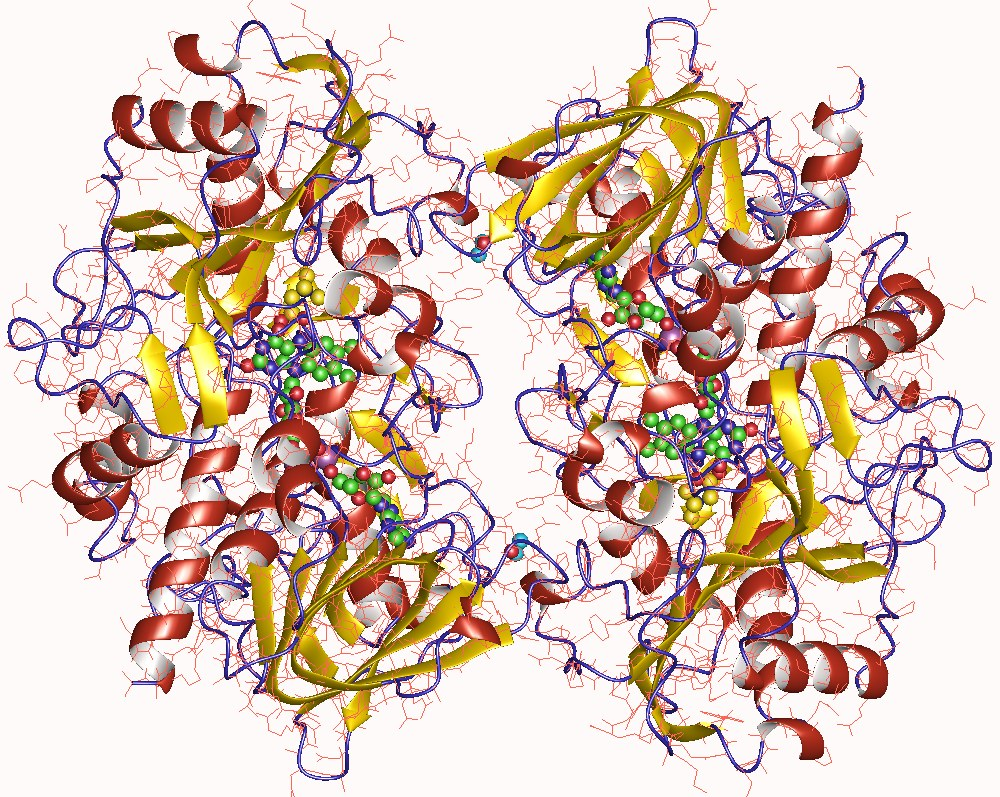
- Choline oxidase dimer, Arthrobacter globiformis

Identifiers
- EC no.: 1.1.3.17
- CAS no.: 9028-67-5

Databases
- BRENDA: enzyme data
- ExPASy: NiceZyme view
- KEGG: enzyme entry
- MetaCyc: metabolic pathway
- Rhea: reactions
- PDB structures: RCSB PDB PDBe PDBsum
Search
- PMC: articles
- PubMed: articles
- NCBI: proteins

In enzymology, choline oxidase (EC 1.1.3.17) is an enzyme that catalyzes two consecutive chemical reactions

choline
O_{2}
H_{2}O_{2}
O_{2}
H_{2}O_{2}
glycine betaine aldehyde
glycine betaine aldehyde
O_{2}
H_{2}O_{2}
O_{2}
H_{2}O_{2}
trimethylglycine

The two substrates of this enzyme are choline and oxygen. The first reaction gives betaine aldehyde and hydrogen peroxide. The aldehyde intermediate is then further oxidised to trimethylglycine.

This enzyme belongs to the family of oxidoreductases, specifically those acting on the CH-OH group of donor with oxygen as acceptor. The systematic name of this enzyme class is choline:oxygen 1-oxidoreductase. This enzyme participates in glycine, serine, and threonine metabolism. It employs one cofactor, FAD.
