= PEMT =

PEMT may refer to:

- Phosphatidylethanolamine N-methyltransferase, an enzyme encoded by the PEMT gene which synthesizes phosphatidylcholine
- Polymorphic epithelial mucin, a mucin encoded by the MUC1 gene in humans
- Post-edited machine translation, whereby humans amend machine-generated translation to achieve an acceptable final product
