= ProV RNA motif =

proV
- Consensus secondary structure and sequence conservation of proV RNA

Identifiers
- Symbol: proV
- Rfam: RF03045

Other data
- RNA type: Gene; sRNA
- SO: SO:0001263
- PDB structures: PDBe

The proV RNA motif is a conserved RNA structure that was discovered by bioinformatics. proV motif RNAs are found in Pseudomonas.

proV RNAs are located upstream of genes that encode transporters. The substrate of these transporters is unknown, but computationally predicted as either proline or glycine betaine. This placement of proV RNAs is consistent with a function as a cis-regulatory elements. However, it is also possible that they operate in trans as small RNAs.
