= 3-Dehydrocarnitine =

Names
- Preferred IUPAC name 3-Oxo-4-(trimethylazaniumyl)butanoate

Identifiers
CAS Number	10457-99-5
3D model (JSmol)	Interactive image
ChEBI	CHEBI:57885
ChemSpider	5360148
KEGG	C02636
MeSH	3-dehydrocarnitine
PubChem CID	6991982
UNII	759KUA9C5Z
CompTox Dashboard (EPA)	DTXSID10426297
- InChI: InChI=1S/C7H13NO3/c1-8(2,3)5-6(9)4-7(10)11/h4-5H2,1-3H3 Key: YNOWULSFLVIUDH-UHFFFAOYSA-N; InChI=1/C7H13NO3/c1-8(2,3)5-6(9)4-7(10)11/h4-5H2,1-3H3 Key: YNOWULSFLVIUDH-UHFFFAOYAC
- SMILES: C[N+](C)(C)CC(=O)CC(=O)[O-]

Properties
Chemical formula	C_{7}H_{14}NO_{3}
Molar mass	160.193 g·mol^{−1}
- Except where otherwise noted, data are given for materials in their standard state (at 25 °C [77 °F], 100 kPa). verify (what is ?) Infobox references

3-Dehydrocarnitine is an aliphatic quaternary ammonium betaine that is part of the carnitine family. At physiological pH of 7.3, the major species of 3-dehydrocarnitine is its zwitterionic form, the conjugate base of 3-dehydrocarnitinium. 3-Dehydrocarnitine is classified as a short-chain keto acid, as it has a carbon chain containing less than six carbon atoms. It is an intermediate in carnitine degradation and is formed from D- or L-carnitine. The enzymes responsible for the degradation of carnitine to 3-dehydrocarnitine are carnitine-3-dehydrogenase or (S)-carnitine-3-dehydrogenase.

== Biological role ==
=== Role in humans ===
3-Dehydrocarnitine has a role as a human metabolite, as it is an intermediate of the degradation of carnitine. Carnitine is utilized in the transport of fatty acids from the cytosol into the mitochondria of living cells during the breakdown of fatty acids for the generation of metabolic energy. In humans, 3-dehydrocarnitine is found in the blood, saliva, urine, and feces. In patients with colorectal cancer, elevated levels of 3-dehydrocarnitine have been detected, possibly due to the elevated rate of metabolism seen in malignant cancer cells.

=== Presence in other animals ===
3-Dehydrocarnitine is also found exogenously in multiple sources of food, such as poultry, lagomorph, sheep, goat, beef, venison, equine, and pork. This indicates its presence in the animals the food is derived from. 3-Dehydrocarnitine is also present in mice and Apis cerana. It is found as a metabolite in aging mouse brains, and is found as a product of Apis cerana.

=== Role in bacteria ===
Bacteria in the genus Pseudomonas are able to aerobically grow on L-carnitine, as it is the bacteria's sole source of nitrogen and carbon. The L-carnitine is metabolized at its beta-hydroxy group by L-carnitine-3-dehydrogenase and the coenzyme NAD+, which forms 3-dehydrocarnitine; the 3-dehydrocarnitine then acts as an inducer for the enzyme, further allowing the enzyme to catalyze the reaction. The formed 3-dehydrocarnitine may also be broken down to form glycine betaine which is then metabolized through step demethylation to form glycine.

== See also ==
- Carnitine
- Carnitine dehydrogenase
- Enzyme
- Metabolism
- Pseudomonas
