= Choline dehydrogenase =

Class of enzymes

Identifiers
- EC no.: 1.1.99.1
- CAS no.: 9028-67-5

Databases
- IntEnz: IntEnz view
- BRENDA: BRENDA entry
- ExPASy: NiceZyme view
- KEGG: KEGG entry
- MetaCyc: metabolic pathway
- PRIAM: profile
- PDB structures: RCSB PDB PDBe PDBsum
- Gene Ontology: AmiGO / QuickGO
Search
- PMC: articles
- PubMed: articles
- NCBI: proteins

In enzymology, choline dehydrogenase (EC 1.1.99.1) is an enzyme that catalyzes the chemical reaction

choline
+ electron acceptor
glycine betaine aldehyde
+ reduced acceptor

The two substrates of this enzyme are choline and an electron acceptor. Its products are glycine betaine aldehyde and the corresponding reduced acceptor. The enzyme is a quinoprotein.

This enzyme belongs to the family of oxidoreductases, specifically those acting on the CH-OH group of donor with other acceptors. The systematic name of this enzyme class is choline:acceptor 1-oxidoreductase. Other names in common use include choline oxidase, choline-cytochrome c reductase, choline:(acceptor) oxidoreductase, and choline:(acceptor) 1-oxidoreductase. This enzyme participates in glycine, serine and threonine metabolism. It employs one cofactor, PQQ.
