= Trimethylglycine =

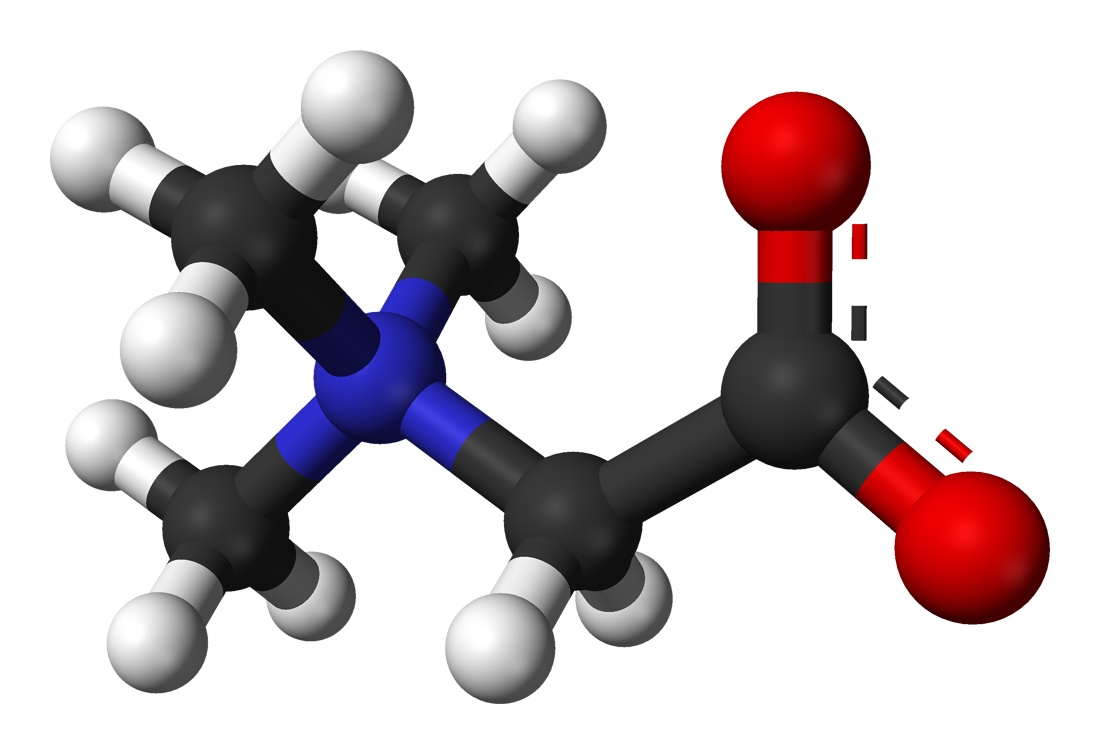

Names
- IUPAC name (Trimethylammonio)acetate
- Other names: Betaine; TMG; glycine betaine; N,N,N-trimethylglycine; Cystadane; Amversio

Identifiers
CAS Number	107-43-7
3D model (JSmol)	Interactive image
Beilstein Reference	3537113
ChEBI	CHEBI:17750
ChEMBL	ChEMBL1182
ChemSpider	242
DrugBank	DB06756
ECHA InfoCard	100.003.174
EC Number	203-490-6
Gmelin Reference	26434
IUPHAR/BPS	4550
KEGG	C00719
MeSH	Betaine
PubChem CID	247
UNII	3SCV180C9W
CompTox Dashboard (EPA)	DTXSID8022666
- InChI: InChI=1S/C5H11NO2/c1-6(2,3)4-5(7)8/h4H2,1-3H3 Key: KWIUHFFTVRNATP-UHFFFAOYSA-N; InChI=1/C5H11NO2/c1-6(2,3)4-5(7)8/h4H2,1-3H3 Key: KWIUHFFTVRNATP-UHFFFAOYAI
- SMILES: C[N+](C)(C)CC(=O)[O-]

Properties
Chemical formula	C_{5}H_{11}NO_{2}
Molar mass	117.146
Appearance	White solid
Melting point	293 °C (559 °F; 566 K) (anhydrous, decomposes)
Solubility in water	Soluble
Solubility	Methanol
Acidity (pK_{a})	1.84

Pharmacology
ATC code	A16AA06 (WHO)
License data	EU EMA: by Betaine anhydrous
Routes of administration	By mouth
Legal status	CA: OTC; US: ℞-only; EU: Rx-only

Hazards
- GHS labelling
Pictograms	(GHS07: Exclamation mark)
Signal word	Warning
Hazard statements	H315, H319
Precautionary statements	P264, P280, P302+P352, P305+P351+P338, P321, P332+P313, P337+P313, P362

Related compounds
Related amino acids	Glycine; Methylglycine; Dimethylglycine
- Except where otherwise noted, data are given for materials in their standard state (at 25 °C [77 °F], 100 kPa). verify (what is ?) Infobox references

Trimethylglycine is an amino acid derivative with the formula (CH_{3})_{3}N^{+}CH_{2}CO^{−}_{2}. A colorless, water-soluble solid, it occurs in plants. Trimethylglycine is a zwitterion: the molecule contains both a quaternary ammonium group and a carboxylate group. Trimethylglycine was the first betaine discovered; originally it was simply called betaine because it was discovered in sugar beets (Beta vulgaris subsp. vulgaris). Several other betaines are now known.

== Medical uses ==
The US Food and Drug Administration (FDA) approved betaine trimethylglycine (also known by the brand name Cystadane) for the treatment of homocystinuria, a disease caused by abnormally high homocysteine levels at birth. Specifically, the compound is indicated for the adjunctive treatment of homocystinuria, involving deficiencies or defects in cystathionine beta-synthase (CBS), 5,10-methylene-tetrahydrofolate reductase (MTHFR), or cobalamin cofactor metabolism (cbl). The EU has authorized the health claim that betaine "contributes to normal homocysteine metabolism."

Betaine is marketed under the brand name Cystadane. Trimethylglycine is also used as the hydrochloride salt (marketed as betaine hydrochloride or betaine HCl).

Betaine hydrochloride was sold over-the-counter (OTC) as a purported gastric aid in the United States. US Code of Federal Regulations, Title 21, Section 310.540, which became effective in November 1993, banned the marketing of betaine hydrochloride as a digestive aid due to insufficient evidence to classify it as "generally recognized as safe and effective" for that specified use.

The most common side effect in medical applications is elevated blood methionine levels.

Trimethylglycine supplementation lowers homocysteine but also raises (given in high doses of 6g/day) LDL-cholesterol in obese individuals and renal patients.

== Biological occurrence ==
=== Biosynthesis ===
In most organisms, glycine betaine is biosynthesized by oxidation of choline. The intermediate, betaine aldehyde, is generated by the action of the enzyme mitochondrial choline oxidase (choline dehydrogenase, EC 1.1.99.1). In mice, betaine aldehyde is further oxidised in the mitochondria by the enzyme betaine-aldehyde dehydrogenase (EC 1.2.1.8). In humans betaine aldehyde activity is performed by a nonspecific cystosolic aldehyde dehydrogenase enzyme (EC 1.2.1.3)

Trimethylglycine is produced by some cyanobacteria, as established by ^{13}C nuclear magnetic resonance. It is proposed to protect for some enzymes, against inhibition by NaCl and KCl.

=== Osmolyte ===
Trimethylglycine is an osmolyte, a water-soluble salt-like substance. Sugar beet was cultivated from sea beet, which requires osmolytes in order to survive the salty soils of coastal areas. Trimethylglycine also occurs in high concentrations (~10 mM) in many marine invertebrates, such as crustaceans and molluscs. It serves as a appetitive attractant to generalist carnivores such as the predatory sea slug Pleurobranchaea californica.

=== Methyl donor ===
Trimethylglycine is a cofactor in methylation, a process that occurs in all mammals. Methylation is required for the biosynthesis of the neurotransmitters dopamine and serotonin, as well as for the synthesis of melatonin and coenzyme Q_{10}. DNA methylation is also involved in epigenetics.

The methylation cycle involves the remethylation of homocysteine, which occurs via either of two pathways. One pathway, present in virtually all cells, involves the enzyme methionine synthase (MS), which requires vitamin B_{12} as a cofactor, and also depends indirectly on folate and other B vitamins. The second pathway is restricted to the liver and kidneys in most mammals and involves betaine-homocysteine methyltransferase (BHMT), requiring trimethylglycine as a methyl donor. During normal physiological conditions, the two pathways contribute equally to removal of homocysteine in the human body.

Dimethylglycine dehydrogenase also uses betaine to produce folate, contributing back to methionine synthase.

Betaine is thus involved in the synthesis of many biologically important molecules, and may be even more important in situations where the major pathway for the regeneration of methionine from homocysteine has been compromised by genetic polymorphisms such as mutations in the MS gene.

== Human use ==
Trimethylglycine is used as a supplement for both animals and plants. Processing sucrose from sugar beets yields glycine betaine as a byproduct. The economic significance of trimethylglycine is comparable to that of sugar in sugar beets. Betaine is commercially important for the poultry industry. It prevents coccidiosis, which costs billions of dollars annually.

Salmon farms apply trimethylglycine to relieve the osmotic pressure on the scales when workers transfer the fish from freshwater to saltwater.

Betaine is not needed when sufficient dietary choline is present for synthesis. When insufficient betaine is available, elevated homocysteine levels and decreased SAM levels in blood occur. Supplementation of betaine in this situation would resolve these blood marker issues, but not compensate for other functions of choline.

=== In foods ===
Betaine in foods
Food	Betaine (mg/100 g)
Wheat germ, toasted	1240
Quinoa	630
Wheat germ	410
Lamb's quarters	330
Wheat bran	320
Canned Beetroot	260
Dark Rye flour	150
Spinach	110-130

Trimethylglycine is a popular dietary supplement for athletes.

In 2017, the European Food Safety Authority concluded that betaine was safe "as a novel food to be used at a maximum intake level of 6 mg/kg body weight per day in addition to the intake from the background diet." Trimethylglycine supplementation may cause diarrhea, bloating, cramps, dyspepsia, nausea or vomiting. Although rare, it can also cause excessive increases in serum methionine concentrations in the brain, which may lead to cerebral edema, a life-threatening condition.

=== Biochemistry ===
The addition of betaine to polymerase chain reactions improves the amplification of DNA by reducing the formation of secondary structure in GC-rich regions. The addition of betaine may enhance the specificity of the polymerase chain reaction by eliminating the base pair composition dependence of DNA melting.
