= Arakawa's syndrome II =

- Other names: Methionine synthase deficiency, Tetrahydrofolate-methyltransferase deficiency syndrome, and N5-methylhomocysteine transferase deficiency.
- methylcobalamin
- Named after: Tsuneo Arakawa

Arakawa's syndrome II is an autosomal dominant metabolic disorder that causes a deficiency of the enzyme tetrahydrofolate-methyltransferase; affected individuals cannot properly metabolize methylcobalamin, a type of Vitamin B_{12}.

== Presentation ==
This disorder causes neurological problems, including intellectual disability, brain atrophy and ventricular dilation, myoclonus, hypotonia, and epilepsy.

It is also associated with growth retardation, megaloblastic anemia, pectus excavatum, scoliosis, vomiting, diarrhea, and hepatosplenomegaly.

== Genetics ==
Arakawa's syndrome II has an autosomal dominant pattern of inheritance.

Arakawa's syndrome II is inherited in an autosomal dominant manner. This means the defective gene responsible for disorder is located on an autosome, and one copy of the defective gene is sufficient to cause the disorder when inherited from a parent who has the disorder.

== Eponym ==
The syndrome is named after Tsuneo Arakawa (1949–2003), a Japanese physician. ("Arakawa syndrome I" refers to glutamate formiminotransferase deficiency.)
