= (Methionine synthase) reductase =

Class of enzymes

[methionine synthase] reductase
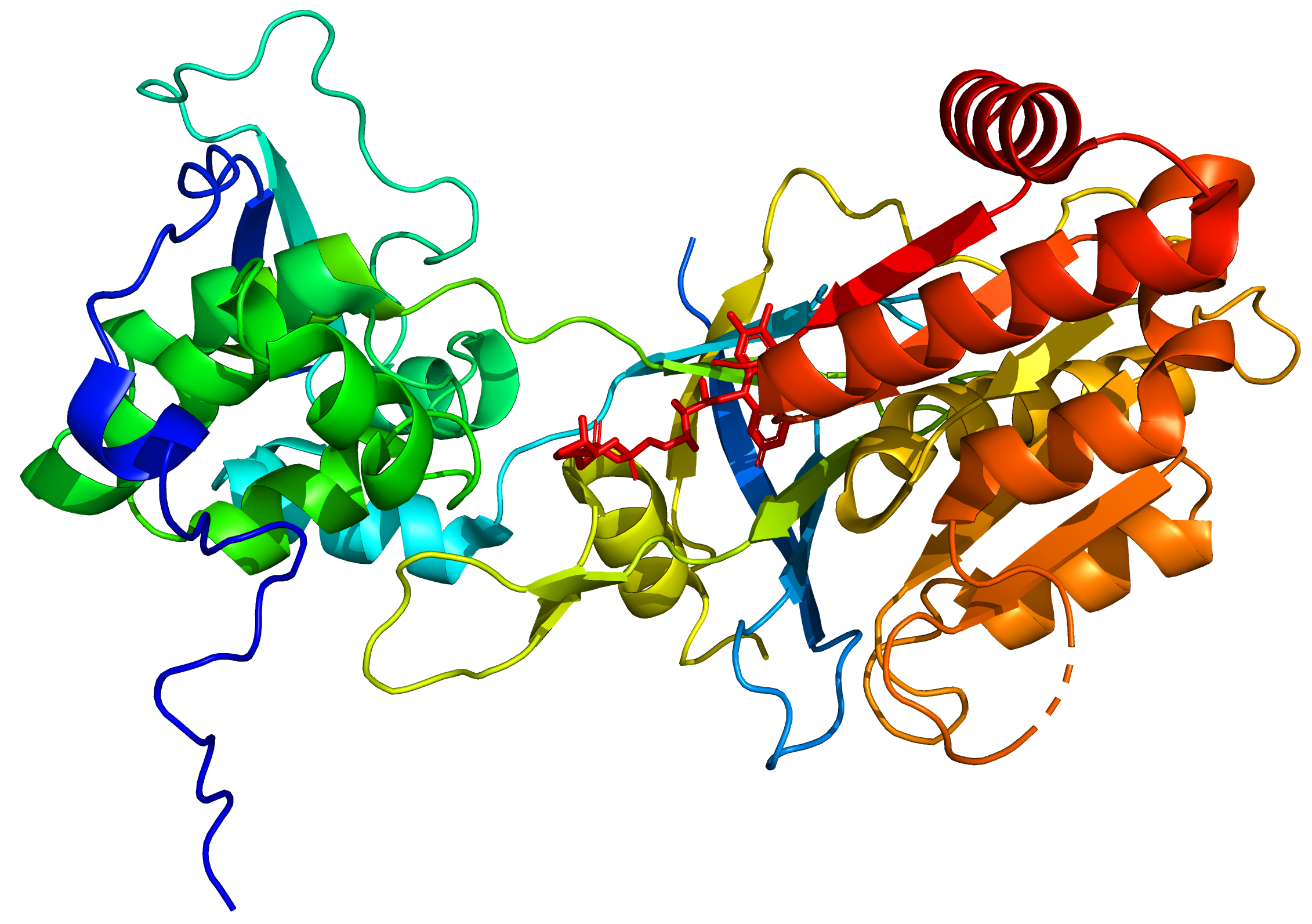
- 2QTL

Identifiers
- EC no.: 1.16.1.8
- CAS no.: 207004-87-3
- Alt. names: MTRR

Databases
- IntEnz: IntEnz view
- BRENDA: BRENDA entry
- ExPASy: NiceZyme view
- KEGG: KEGG entry
- MetaCyc: metabolic pathway
- PRIAM: profile
- PDB structures: RCSB PDB PDBe PDBsum
- Gene Ontology: AmiGO / QuickGO
Search
- PMC: articles
- PubMed: articles
- NCBI: proteins

[Methionine synthase] reductase, or Methionine synthase reductase, encoded by the gene MTRR, is an enzyme that is responsible for the reduction of methionine synthase inside human body. This enzyme is crucial for maintaining the one carbon metabolism, specifically the folate cycle. The enzyme employs one coenzyme, flavoprotein.

== Mechanism ==
MTRR works by catalyzing the following chemical reaction:

2 [methionine synthase]-methylcob(I)alamin + 2 S-adenosylhomocysteine + NADP^{+} $\rightleftharpoons$ 2 [methionine synthase]-cob(II)alamin + NADPH + H^{+} + 2 S-adenosyl-L-methionine

The 3 products of this enzyme are methionine synthase-methylcob(I)alamin, S-adenosylhomocysteine, and NADP^{+}, whereas its 4 substrates are methionine synthase-cob(II)alamin, NADPH, H^{+}, and S-adenosyl-L-methionine.

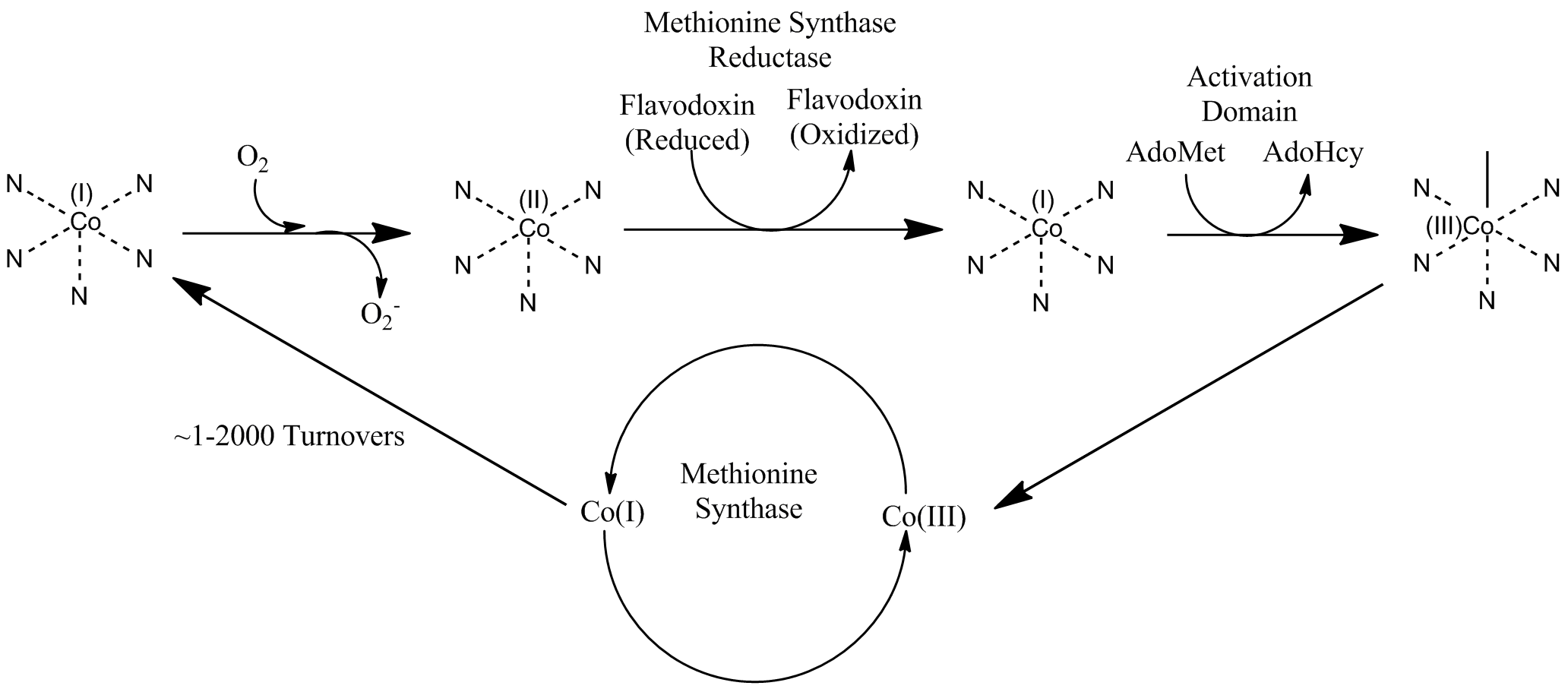
Scavenger Pathway of Methionine Synthase Reductase to Recover Inactivated Methionine Synthase

Physiologically speaking, one crucial enzyme in the folate cycle is methionine synthase, which incorporates the coenzyme cobalamin (also known as Vitamin B_{12}). The coenzyme utilizes its cofactor, cobalt to catalyze the transferring function, in which the cobalt will switch between having 1 or 3 valence electrons, dubbed cob(I)alamin, and cob(III)alamin.

Over time, the cob(I)alamin cofactor of methionine synthase becomes oxidized to cob(II)alamin, rendering the enzyme inactive. Therefore, regeneration of the enzyme is necessary. Regeneration requires reductive methylation via a reaction catalyzed by (methionine synthase) reductase in which S-adenosylmethionine is utilized as a methyl donor, reducing cob(II)alamin to cob(I)alamin.

== Systematic naming ==
This enzyme belongs to the family of oxidoreductases, to be specific those oxidizing metal ion with NAD+ or NADP+ as acceptor. The systematic name of this enzyme class is [methionine synthase]-methylcob(I)alamin,S-adenosylhomocysteine:NADP+ oxidoreductase. Other names in common use include methionine synthase cob(II)alamin reductase (methylating), methionine synthase reductase, [methionine synthase]-cobalamin methyltransferase (cob(II)alamin, and reducing).
