= Neurine =

Names
- IUPAC name Trimethylvinylammonium hydroxide
- Other names Vitaloid; N,N,N-Trimethylethenaminium hydroxide

Identifiers
CAS Number	463-88-7
3D model (JSmol)	Interactive image
ChemSpider	9647
ECHA InfoCard	100.006.678
PubChem CID	10042
UNII	G6RL36OO0J
CompTox Dashboard (EPA)	DTXSID70196803
- InChI: InChI=1S/C5H12N.H2O/c1-5-6(2,3)4;/h5H,1H2,2-4H3;1H2/q+1;/p-1 Key: NIPLIJLVGZCKMP-UHFFFAOYSA-M; InChI=1/C5H12N.H2O/c1-5-6(2,3)4;/h5H,1H2,2-4H3;1H2/q+1;/p-1 Key: NIPLIJLVGZCKMP-REWHXWOFAL
- SMILES: C=C[N+](C)(C)C.[OH-]

Properties
Chemical formula	C_{5}H_{13}NO
Molar mass	103.165 g·mol^{−1}
Appearance	Syrupy liquid
Solubility in water	Soluble
- Except where otherwise noted, data are given for materials in their standard state (at 25 °C [77 °F], 100 kPa). verify (what is ?) Infobox references

Neurine is an alkaloid found in egg yolk, brain, bile and in cadavers. It is formed during putrefaction of biological tissues by the dehydration of choline. It is a poisonous, syrupy liquid with a fishy odor.

Neurine is a quaternary ammonium salt with three methyl groups and one vinyl group attached to the nitrogen atom. Synthetically, neurine can be prepared by the reaction of acetylene with trimethylamine. Neurine is unstable and decomposes readily to form trimethylamine.
