= Betaine-aldehyde dehydrogenase =

Enzyme

betaine-aldehyde dehydrogenase
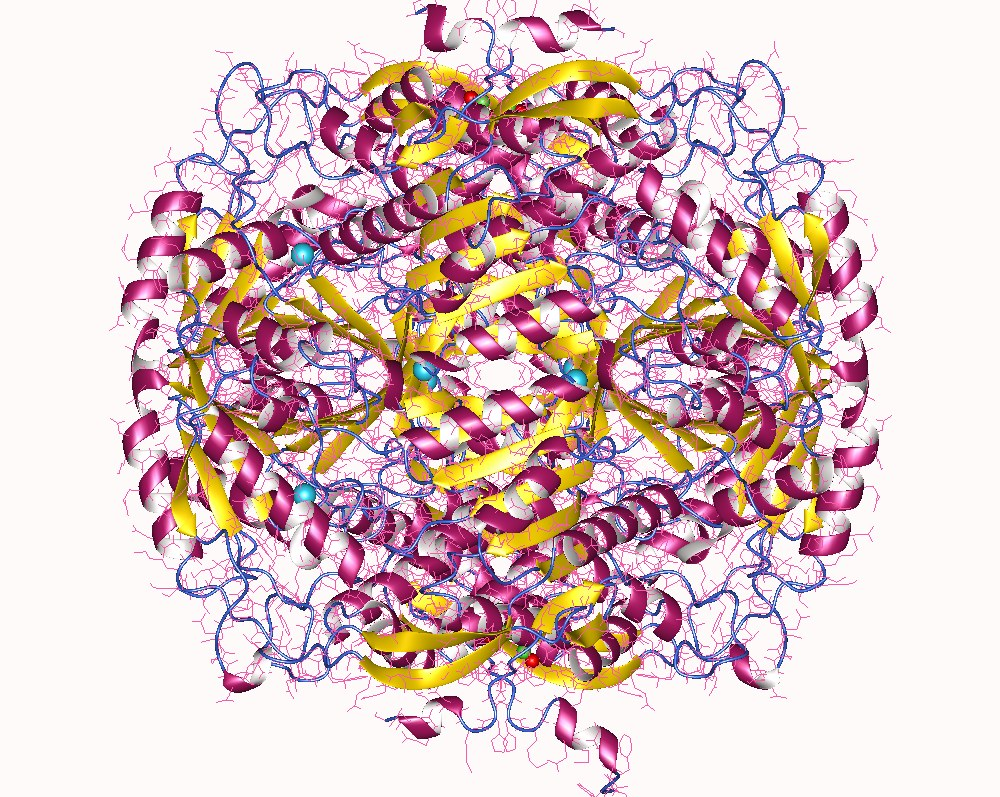
- Betaine aldehyde dehydrogenase tetramer, Staphylococcus aureus

Identifiers
- EC no.: 1.2.1.8
- CAS no.: 9028-90-4

Databases
- IntEnz: IntEnz view
- BRENDA: BRENDA entry
- ExPASy: NiceZyme view
- KEGG: KEGG entry
- MetaCyc: metabolic pathway
- PRIAM: profile
- PDB structures: RCSB PDB PDBe PDBsum
- Gene Ontology: AmiGO / QuickGO
Search
- PMC: articles
- PubMed: articles
- NCBI: proteins

In enzymology, betaine-aldehyde dehydrogenase (EC 1.2.1.8) is an enzyme that catalyzes the chemical reaction

glycine betaine aldehyde
+ NAD^{+}
H_{2}O
2 H^{+}
H_{2}O
2 H^{+}
trimethylglycine
+ NADH

The three substrates of this enzyme are glycine betaine aldehyde, oxidised nicotinamide adenine dinucleotide (NAD^{+}), and water. Its products are trimethylglycine, reduced NADH, and a proton.

This enzyme belongs to the family of oxidoreductases, specifically those acting on the aldehyde or oxo group of donor with NAD+ or NADP+ as acceptor. The systematic name of this enzyme class is betaine-aldehyde:NAD+ oxidoreductase. Other names in common use include betaine aldehyde oxidase, BADH, betaine aldehyde dehydrogenase, and BetB. This enzyme participates in glycine, serine and threonine metabolism.

== Structural studies ==
As of late 2007, 4 structures have been solved for this class of enzymes, with PDB accession codes 1A4S, 1BPW, 1WNB, and 1WND.
