= Carbon-11-choline =

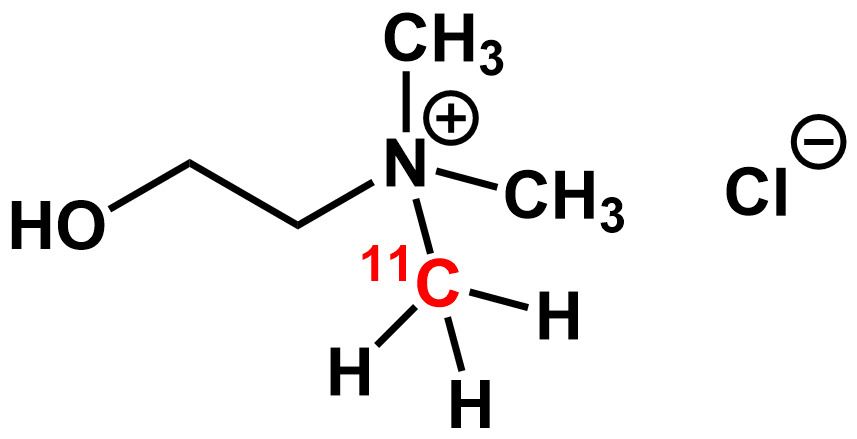
Chemical structure of ^{11}C-choline chloride

Maximum intensity projection of a PET/CT with choline: Note the physiologic accumulation in the liver, pancreas, kidney, bladder, spleen, bone marrow and salivary glands. A bone metastasis is in the left pubic bone.

Carbon-11 choline is the basis of medical imaging technologies. Because of its involvement in biologic processes, choline is related to diseases, leading to the development of medical imaging techniques to monitor its concentration. When radiolabeled with ^{11}CH_{3}, choline is a useful a tracer in PET imaging. Carbon-11 is radioactive with a half-life of 20.38 minutes. By monitoring the gamma radiation resulting from the decay of carbon-11, the uptake, distribution, and retention of carbon-11 choline can be monitored.

Choline occurs in the head groups of phosphatidylcholine and sphingomyelin, which are abundant in cell membranes. It is the precursor for the neurotransmitter acetylcholine.

== Specific applications ==
One of the first uses of carbon-11 choline in PET imaging examined Alzheimer's disease patients. Choline is the precursor to neurotransmitter acetylcholine whose cholinergic activity is impaired in many neurodegenerative diseases including Alzheimer's. While there was uptake of the tracer in the brain, no pharmacokinetic pattern was found.

Carbon-11 choline has found more success in cancer systems imaging. Choline is a precursor for the synthesis of phospholipids. When a cell is about to divide, it synthesizes these phospholipids to generate enough material to build the cell membranes of the two daughter cells. Thus it was hypothesized that highly proliferative tumors would uptake more choline than the surrounding healthy tissue. This was first tested in brain tumors after successful demonstration of choline uptake in the brain. It was found that these brain tumors had over 10x the uptake of carbon-11 choline than the surrounding brain tissue. Furthermore, because of the low choline uptake in healthy brain tissue, carbon-11 choline was found to be a superior PET tracer than fluorine-18 Fludeoxyglucose (FDG) when delineating brain tumors. Carbon-11 choline has also been used to detect tumors in the colon and esophagus and lung metastases.

Prostate cancer is another disease where carbon-11 choline PET imaging has found success. As with the brain, there is too much signal from the surrounding tissue, especially the bladder, to accurately measure tumor uptake with fluorine-18 FDG. While it was shown carbon-11 choline could be used to detect the initiation of prostate cancer, its value was found in detecting prostate cancer recurrence when it is the most deadly. In 2012, the U.S. Food and Drug Administration approved carbon-11 choline as an imaging agent to be used during a PET scan to detect recurrent prostate cancer.
