= Choline transporter-like protein 1 =

Mammalian protein found in Homo sapiens

SLC44A1

Identifiers
- Aliases: SLC44A1, CD92, CDW92, CHTL1, CTL1, solute carrier family 44 member 1, CONATOC
- External IDs: OMIM: 606105; MGI: 2140592; GeneCards: SLC44A1

Gene location (Human)
Chr.	Chromosome 9 (human)
Band	9q31.1-q31.2	Start	105,244,622 bp
Band	9q31.1-q31.2	End	105,439,171 bp

Gene location (Mouse)
Chr.	Chromosome 4 (mouse)
Band	4|4 B2	Start	53,440,413 bp
Band	4|4 B2	End	53,622,478 bp
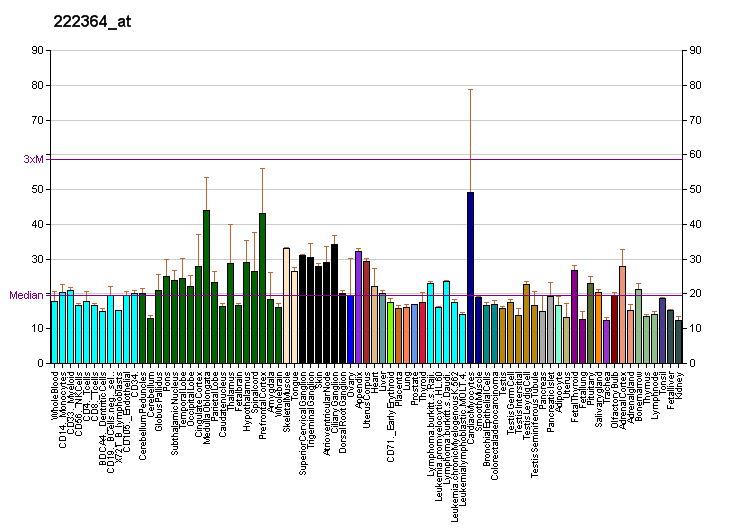
RNA expression pattern
Bgee	Human / Mouse (ortholog); Top expressed in: endothelial cell; inferior ganglion of vagus nerve; internal globus pallidus; subthalamic nucleus; superior vestibular nucleus; external globus pallidus; pars reticulata; ventral tegmental area; mucosa of sigmoid colon; corpus epididymis / Top expressed in: hair follicle; left colon; urothelium; deep cerebellar nuclei; pyloric antrum; transitional epithelium of urinary bladder; medullary collecting duct; gastric mucosa; mucous cell of stomach; Paneth cell; More reference expression data
BioGPS	More reference expression data
Gene ontology
Molecular function	choline transmembrane transporter activity
Cellular component	extracellular exosome; nucleoplasm; mitochondrion; plasma membrane; integral component of membrane; mitochondrial outer membrane; membrane
Biological process	phosphatidylcholine biosynthetic process; transmembrane transport; choline transport; choline catabolic process; transport
Sources:Amigo / QuickGO
Orthologs
Databases	NCBI: entry; OMA: entry
Species	Human	Mouse
Entrez	23446	100434
Ensembl	ENSG00000070214	ENSMUSG00000028412
UniProt	Q8WWI5	Q6X893
RefSeq (mRNA)	NM_001286730; NM_022109; NM_080546; NM_001330731	NM_001159633; NM_133891; NM_001374697
RefSeq (protein)	NP_001273659; NP_001317660; NP_536856	NP_001153105; NP_598652; NP_001361626
Location (UCSC)	Chr 9: 105.24 – 105.44 Mb	Chr 4: 53.44 – 53.62 Mb
PubMed search
- Wikidata
View/Edit Human	View/Edit Mouse

Choline transporter-like protein 1 is a protein that in humans is encoded by the SLC44A1 gene.

Papillary glioneuronal tumors characteristically exhibit a gene fusion between SLC44A1 and PRKCA. Loss of function mutations have been implicated in ethanolamine transport.

== See also ==
- Cluster of differentiation
- Solute carrier family
