= Aldehyde dehydrogenase (NADP+) =

Identifiers
- EC no.: 1.2.1.4
- CAS no.: 9028-87-9

Databases
- IntEnz: IntEnz view
- BRENDA: BRENDA entry
- ExPASy: NiceZyme view
- KEGG: KEGG entry
- MetaCyc: metabolic pathway
- PRIAM: profile
- PDB structures: RCSB PDB PDBe PDBsum
Search
- PMC: articles
- PubMed: articles
- NCBI: proteins

In enzymology, an aldehyde dehydrogenase (NADP+) (EC 1.2.1.4) is an enzyme that catalyzes the chemical reaction

an aldehyde + NADP^{+} + H_{2}O $\rightleftharpoons$ an acid + NADPH + H^{+}

The 3 substrates of this enzyme are aldehyde, NADP^{+}, and H_{2}O, whereas its 3 products are acid, NADPH, and H^{+}.

This enzyme belongs to the family of oxidoreductases, specifically those acting on the aldehyde or oxo group of donor with NAD+ or NADP+ as acceptor. The systematic name of this enzyme class is aldehyde:NADP+ oxidoreductase. Other names in common use include NADP+-acetaldehyde dehydrogenase, NADP+-dependent aldehyde dehydrogenase, and aldehyde dehydrogenase (NADP+). This enzyme participates in caprolactam degradation.
