= Aldehyde dehydrogenase (NAD(P)+) =

aldehyde dehydrogenase [NAD(P)+]

Identifiers
- EC no.: 1.2.1.5
- CAS no.: 9028-88-0

Databases
- IntEnz: IntEnz view
- BRENDA: BRENDA entry
- ExPASy: NiceZyme view
- KEGG: KEGG entry
- MetaCyc: metabolic pathway
- PRIAM: profile
- PDB structures: RCSB PDB PDBe PDBsum
- Gene Ontology: AmiGO / QuickGO
Search
- PMC: articles
- PubMed: articles
- NCBI: proteins

In enzymology, an aldehyde dehydrogenase [NAD(P)+] (EC 1.2.1.5) is an enzyme that catalyzes the chemical reaction

an aldehyde + NAD(P)+ + H_{2}O $\rightleftharpoons$ an acid + NAD(P)H + H^{+}

The 4 substrates of this enzyme are aldehyde, NAD^{+}, NADP^{+}, and H_{2}O, whereas its 4 products are acid, NADH, NADPH, and H^{+}.

This enzyme belongs to the family of oxidoreductases, specifically those acting on the aldehyde or oxo group of donor with NAD+ or NADP+ as acceptor. The systematic name of this enzyme class is aldehyde:NAD(P)+ oxidoreductase. Other names in common use include aldehyde dehydrogenase [NAD(P)+], and ALDH. This enzyme participates in 5 metabolic pathways: glycolysis / gluconeogenesis, histidine metabolism, tyrosine metabolism, phenylalanine metabolism, and metabolism of xenobiotics by cytochrome p450.

== Structural studies ==
As of late 2007, 4 structures have been solved for this class of enzymes, with PDB accession codes 1AD3, 1EYY, 1EZ0, and 2AMF.
