= Phosphatidylethanolamine N-methyltransferase =

Class of enzymes

Identifiers
- EC no.: 2.1.1.17
- CAS no.: 37256-91-0

Databases
- BRENDA: enzyme data
- ExPASy: NiceZyme view
- KEGG: enzyme entry
- MetaCyc: metabolic pathway
- Rhea: reactions
- PDB structures: RCSB PDB PDBe PDBsum
- Gene Ontology: AmiGO / QuickGO
Search
- PMC: articles
- PubMed: articles
- NCBI: proteins

PEMT

Identifiers
- Aliases: PEMT, PEAMT, PEMPT, PEMT2, PNMT, phosphatidylethanolamine N-methyltransferase, PLMT
- External IDs: OMIM: 602391; MGI: 104535; GeneCards: PEMT
Enzyme activity
EC #	BRENDA	ExPASy	KEGG	MetaCyc
2.1.1.17	↗	↗	↗	↗
2.1.1.71	↗	↗	↗	↗

Gene location (Human)
Chr.	Chromosome 17 (human)
Band	17p11.2	Start	17,505,563 bp
Band	17p11.2	End	17,591,708 bp

Gene location (Mouse)
Chr.	Chromosome 11 (mouse)
Band	11 B1.3|11 37.81 cM	Start	59,861,440 bp
Band	11 B1.3|11 37.81 cM	End	59,937,315 bp
RNA expression pattern
Bgee	Human / Mouse (ortholog); Top expressed in: corpus epididymis; right lobe of liver; beta cell; right uterine tube; anterior pituitary; canal of the cervix; caput epididymis; subcutaneous adipose tissue; right testis; left testis / Top expressed in: morula; morula; left lobe of liver; blastocyst; embryo; embryo; gallbladder; spermatocyte; muscle of thigh; ventricular zone; More reference expression data
BioGPS	n/a
Gene ontology
Molecular function	methyltransferase activity; transferase activity; S-adenosylmethionine-dependent methyltransferase activity; phosphatidylethanolamine binding; phosphatidyl-N-methylethanolamine N-methyltransferase activity; phosphatidylethanolamine N-methyltransferase activity; phosphatidyl-N-dimethylethanolamine N-methyltransferase activity
Cellular component	integral component of membrane; mitochondrial membranes; membrane; brush border membrane; endoplasmic reticulum; mitochondrion; sarcolemma; endoplasmic reticulum membrane
Biological process	response to amino acid; response to vitamin; response to nutrient; lipid metabolism; S-adenosylmethionine metabolic process; methylation; S-adenosylhomocysteine metabolic process; phospholipid biosynthetic process; glycerophospholipid metabolic process; cell population proliferation; response to ethanol; positive regulation of lipoprotein metabolic process; negative regulation of cell population proliferation; sphingomyelin biosynthetic process; phosphatidylcholine biosynthetic process; blastocyst hatching; positive regulation of cold-induced thermogenesis
Sources:Amigo / QuickGO
Orthologs
Databases	NCBI: entry; OMA: entry
Species	Human	Mouse
Entrez	10400	18618
Ensembl	ENSG00000133027	ENSMUSG00000000301
UniProt	Q9UBM1	Q61907
RefSeq (mRNA)	NM_001267551; NM_001267552; NM_007169; NM_148172; NM_148173	NM_001290011; NM_001290012; NM_001290013; NM_001290014; NM_008819
RefSeq (protein)	NP_001254480; NP_001254481; NP_009100; NP_680477; NP_680478	NP_001276940; NP_001276941; NP_001276942; NP_001276943; NP_032845
Location (UCSC)	Chr 17: 17.51 – 17.59 Mb	Chr 11: 59.86 – 59.94 Mb
PubMed search
- Wikidata
View/Edit Human	View/Edit Mouse

Phosphatidylethanolamine N-methyltransferase (abbreviated PEMT) is a transferase enzyme (EC 2.1.1.17) which converts phosphatidylethanolamine (PE) to phosphatidylcholine (PC) in the liver. In humans it is encoded by the PEMT gene within the Smith–Magenis syndrome region on chromosome 17.

While the CDP-choline pathway, in which choline obtained either by dietary consumption or by metabolism of choline-containing lipids is converted to PC, accounts for approximately 70% of PC biosynthesis in the liver, the PEMT pathway has been shown to have played a critical evolutionary role in providing PC during times of starvation. Furthermore, PC made via PEMT plays a wide range of physiological roles, utilized in choline synthesis, hepatocyte membrane structure, bile secretion, and very low-density lipoprotein (VLDL) secretion.

== Nomenclature ==
Phosphatidylethanolamine N-methyltransferase is also known as lipid methyl transferase, LMTase, phosphatidylethanolamine methyltransferase, phosphatidylethanolamine-N-methylase, and phosphatidylethanolamine-S-adenosylmethionine-methyltransferase.

== Function ==
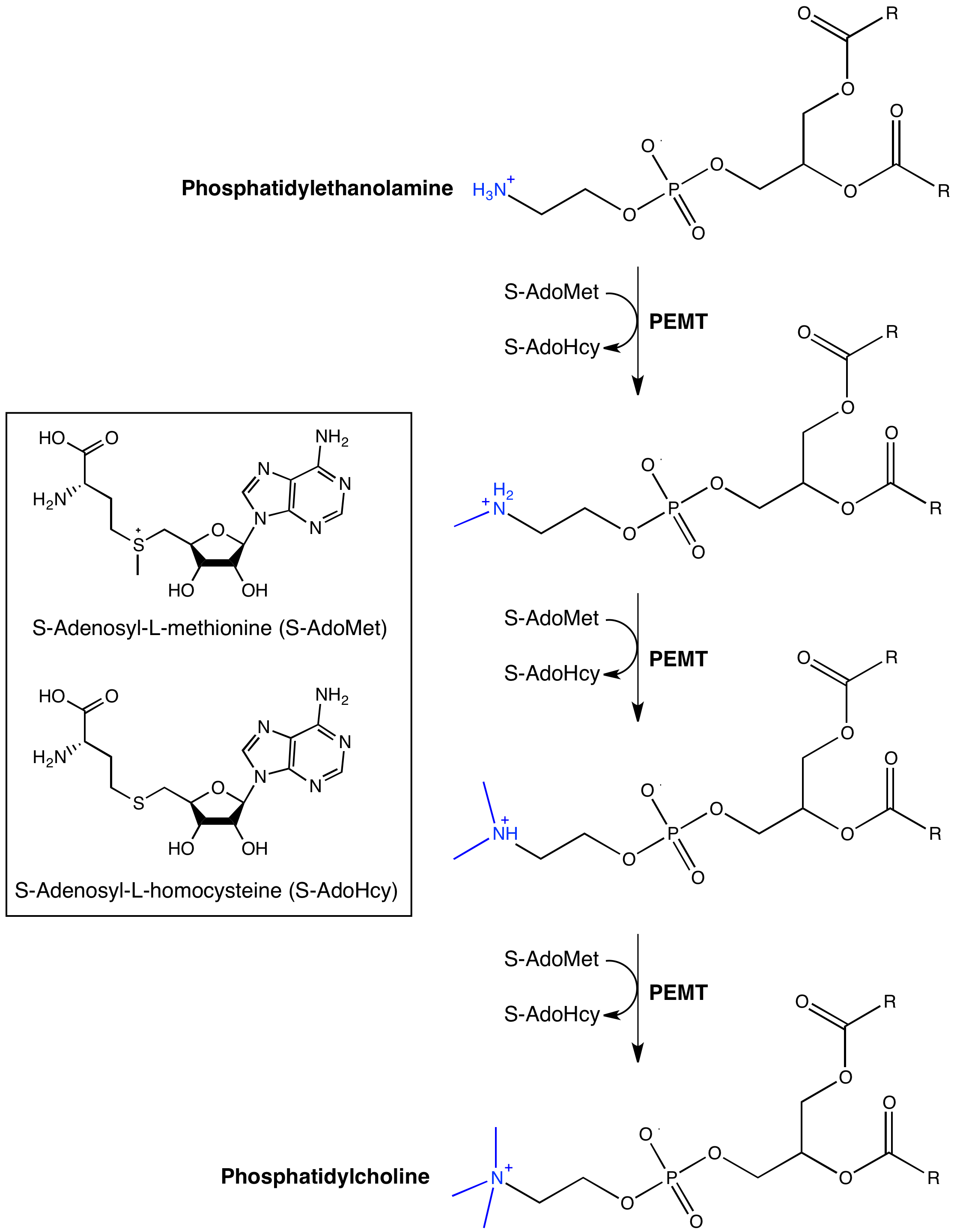
Overview of reactions catalyzed by phosphatidylethanolamine N-methyltransferase (PEMT).

The PEMT enzyme converts phosphatidylethanolamine (PE) to phosphatidylcholine (PC) via three sequential methylations by S-adenosyl methionine (SAM). The enzyme is found in endoplasmic reticulum and mitochondria-associated membranes. It accounts for ~30% of PC biosynthesis, with the CDP-choline, or Kennedy, pathway making ~70%. PC, typically the most abundant phospholipid in animals and plants, accounts for more than half of cell membrane phospholipids and approximately 30% of all cellular lipid content. The PEMT pathway is therefore crucial for maintaining membrane integrity.

PC made via the PEMT pathway can be degraded by phospholipases C/D, resulting in the de novo formation of choline. Thus, the PEMT pathway contributes to maintaining brain and liver function and larger-scale energy metabolism in the body.

PC molecules produced by PEMT-catalyzed methylation of PE are more diverse, and tend to contain longer chain, polyunsaturated species and more arachidonate, whereas those produced via the CDP-choline pathway are typically composed of medium-length, saturated chains.

A major pathway for hepatic PC utilization is secretion of bile into the intestine. PEMT activity also dictates normal very low-density lipoprotein (VLDL) secretion by the liver. PEMT is also a significant source and regulator of plasma homocysteine, which can be secreted or converted to methionine or cysteine.

== Mechanism ==
The exact mechanism by which PEMT catalyzes the sequential methylation of PE by three molecules of SAM to form PC remains unknown. Kinetic analyses as well as amino acid and gene sequencing have shed some light on how the enzyme works. Studies suggest that a single substrate binding site binds all three phospholipids methylated by PEMT: PE, phosphatidyl-monomethylethanolamine (PMME) and phosphatidyl-dimethylethanolamine. The first methylation, that of PE to PMME, has been shown to be the rate-limiting step in conversion of PE to PC. It is suspected that the structure or specific conformation adopted by PE has a lower affinity for the PEMT active site; consequently, upon methylation, PMME would be immediately converted to PDME and PDME to PC, via a Bi-Bi or ping-pong mechanism before another PE molecule could enter the active site.

== Structure ==
Purification of PEMT by Neale D. Ridgway and Dennis E. Vance in 1987 produced an 18.3 kDa protein. Subsequent cloning, sequencing, and expression of PEMT cDNA resulted in a 22.3 kDa, 199-amino acid protein. Although the enzymatic structure is unknown, PEMT is proposed to contain four hydrophobic membrane-spanning regions, with both its C and N termini on the cytosolic side of the ER membrane. Kinetic studies indicate a common binding site for PE, PMME, and PDME substrates. SAM binding motifs have been identified on both the third and fourth transmembrane sequences. Site-directed mutagenesis has pinpointed the residues Gly98, Gly100, Glu180, and Glu181 to be essential for SAM binding in the active site.

== Regulation ==
PEMT activity is unrelated to enzyme mass, but rather is regulated by supply of substrates including PE, as well as PMME, PDME, and SAM. Low substrate levels inhibit PEMT. The enzyme is further regulated by S-adenosylhomocysteine produced after each methylation.

PEMT gene expression is regulated by transcription factors including activator protein 1 (AP-1) and Sp1. Sp1 is a negative regulator of PEMT transcription, yet is it is a positive regulator of choline-phosphate cytidylyltransferase (CT) transcription. This is one of several examples of the reciprocal regulation of PEMT and CT in the PEMT and CDP-choline pathways. Estrogen has also been shown to be a positive regulator of hepatocyte PEMT transcription. Ablation of the estrogen binding site in the PEMT promoter region may increase risk of hepatic steatosis from choline deficiency.

== Disease relevance ==
=== Liver ===
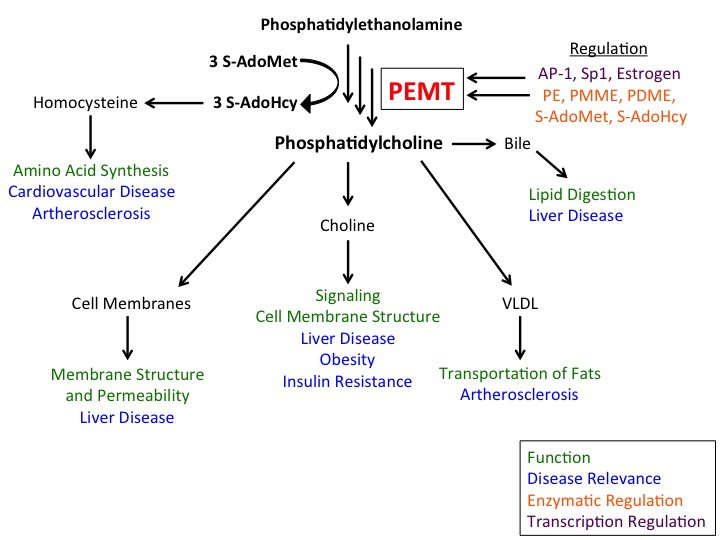
Overview of biological roles and regulation of phosphatidylethanolamine N-methyltransferase (PEMT)

PEMT deficiency in mice, genetically induced by PEMT gene knockout, produced minimal effect on PE and PC levels. However, upon being fed a choline-deficient diet, the mice developed severe liver failure. Rapid PC depletion due to biliary PC secretion, as well as protein leakage from loss of membrane integrity due to lowered PC/PE ratios, led to steatosis and steatohepatitis.

A Val-to-Met substitution at residue 175, leading to reduced PEMT activity, has been linked to non-alcoholic fatty liver disease. This substitution has also been linked to increased frequency of non-alcoholic steatohepatitis.

A single-nucleotide polymorphism (G to C) in the promoter region of the PEMT has been demonstrated to contribute to development of organ dysfunction in conjunction with a low-choline diet.

=== Cardiovascular disease and atherosclerosis ===
PEMT modulates levels of blood plasma homocysteine, which is either secreted or converted to methionine or cysteine. High levels of homocysteine are linked to cardiovascular disease and atherosclerosis, particularly coronary artery disease. PEMT deficiency prevents atherosclerosis in mice fed high-fat, high-cholesterol diets. This is largely a result of lower levels of VLDL lipids in the PEMT-deficient mice. Furthermore, the decreased lipid (PC) content in VLDLs causes changes in lipoprotein structure which allow them to be cleared more rapidly in the PEMT-deficient mice.

=== Obesity and insulin resistance ===
PEMT-deficient mice fed high-fat diets have been shown to resist weight gain and be protected from insulin resistance. One potential reason for this phenomenon is that these mice, which exhibit hypermetabolic behavior, rely more on glucose than on fats for energy. It was concluded that insufficient choline resulted in the lack of weight gain, supported by the fact that PC produced via the PEMT pathway can be used to form choline.

The PEMT deficient mice showed elevated plasma glucagon levels, increased hepatic expression of glucagon receptor, phosphorylated AMP-activated protein kinase (AMPK), and serine-307-phosphorylated insulin receptor substrate 1 (IRS1-s307), which blocks insulin-mediated signal transduction; together, these contribute to enhanced gluconeogenesis and ultimately insulin resistance. Another possibility is that lack of PEMT in adipose tissue may affect normal fat deposition.

== See also ==
- Phosphatidylethanolamine
