= Aldehyde dehydrogenase (pyrroloquinoline-quinone) =

aldehyde dehydrogenase (pyrroloquinoline-quinone)

Identifiers
- EC no.: 1.2.99.3
- CAS no.: 75536-77-5

Databases
- IntEnz: IntEnz view
- BRENDA: BRENDA entry
- ExPASy: NiceZyme view
- KEGG: KEGG entry
- MetaCyc: metabolic pathway
- PRIAM: profile
- PDB structures: RCSB PDB PDBe PDBsum
- Gene Ontology: AmiGO / QuickGO
Search
- PMC: articles
- PubMed: articles
- NCBI: proteins

In enzymology, an aldehyde dehydrogenase (pyrroloquinoline-quinone) (EC 1.2.99.3) is an enzyme that catalyzes the chemical reaction

an aldehyde + acceptor + H_{2}O $\rightleftharpoons$ a carboxylate + reduced acceptor

The 3 substrates of this enzyme are aldehyde, acceptor, and H_{2}O, whereas its two products are carboxylate and reduced acceptor.

This enzyme belongs to the family of oxidoreductases, specifically those acting on the aldehyde or oxo group of donor with other acceptors. The systematic name of this enzyme class is aldehyde:(pyrroloquinoline-quinone) oxidoreductase. This enzyme is also called aldehyde dehydrogenase (acceptor). This enzyme participates in 4 metabolic pathways: fatty acid metabolism, pyruvate metabolism, propanoate metabolism, and butanoate metabolism. It employs one cofactor, PQQ.
