= Aldehyde dehydrogenase (FAD-independent) =

Enzyme in the family of oxidoreductases

Identifiers
- EC no.: 1.2.99.7

Databases
- BRENDA: enzyme data
- ExPASy: NiceZyme view
- KEGG: enzyme entry
- MetaCyc: metabolic pathway
- Rhea: reactions
- PDB structures: RCSB PDB PDBe PDBsum
Search
- PMC: articles
- PubMed: articles
- NCBI: proteins

In enzymology, an aldehyde dehydrogenase (FAD-independent) (EC 1.2.99.7) is an enzyme that catalyzes the chemical reaction

an aldehyde + H_{2}O + acceptor $\rightleftharpoons$ a carboxylate + reduced acceptor

The 3 substrates of this enzyme are aldehyde, H_{2}O, and acceptor, whereas its two products are carboxylate and reduced acceptor.

This enzyme belongs to the family of oxidoreductases, specifically those acting on the aldehyde or oxo group of donor with other acceptors. The systematic name of this enzyme class is aldehyde:acceptor oxidoreductase (FAD-independent). Other names in common use include aldehyde oxidase, aldehyde oxidoreductase, Mop, and AORDd.

== Structural studies ==
As of late 2007, only one structure has been solved for this class of enzymes, with the PDB accession code PDB: 1ZCS.
