= Aldehyde dehydrogenase (NAD+) =

aldehyde dehydrogenase (NAD)
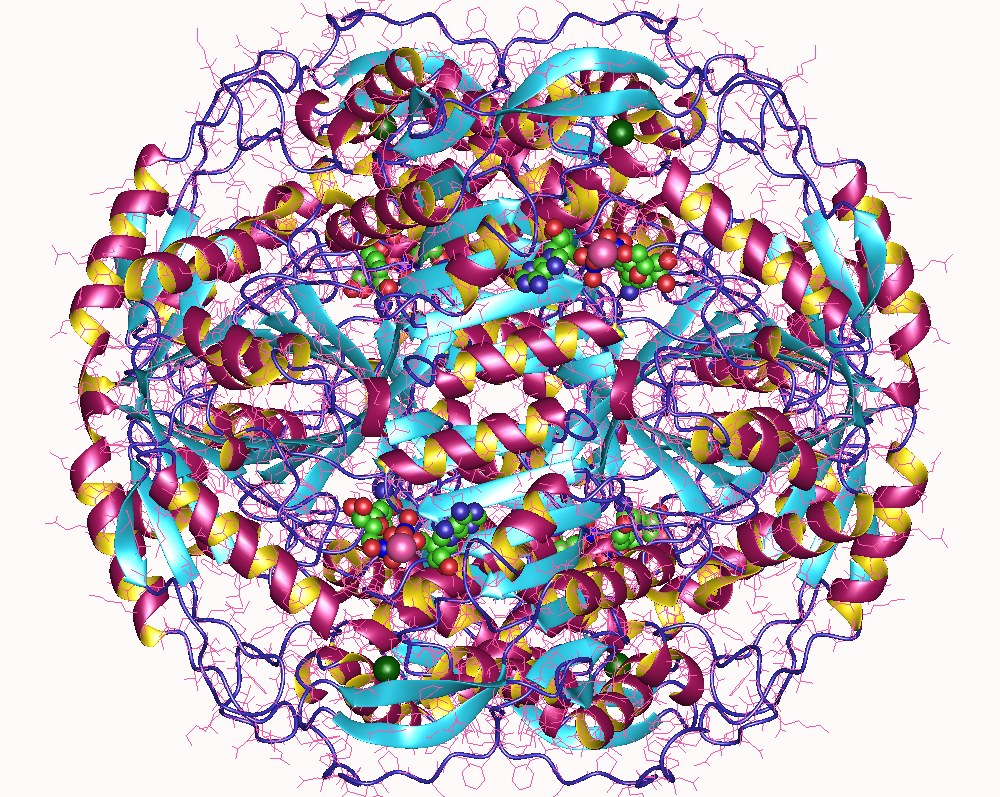
- Aldehyde dehydrogenase tetramer, Human

Identifiers
- EC no.: 1.2.1.3
- CAS no.: 9028-86-8

Databases
- IntEnz: IntEnz view
- BRENDA: BRENDA entry
- ExPASy: NiceZyme view
- KEGG: KEGG entry
- MetaCyc: metabolic pathway
- PRIAM: profile
- PDB structures: RCSB PDB PDBe PDBsum
- Gene Ontology: AmiGO / QuickGO
Search
- PMC: articles
- PubMed: articles
- NCBI: proteins

In enzymology, an aldehyde dehydrogenase (NAD+) (EC 1.2.1.3) is an enzyme that catalyzes the chemical reaction

an aldehyde + NAD^{+} + H_{2}O $\rightleftharpoons$ an acid + NADH + H^{+}

The 3 substrates of this enzyme are aldehyde, NAD^{+}, and H_{2}O, whereas its 3 products are acid, NADH, and H^{+}.

This enzyme belongs to the family of oxidoreductases, specifically those acting on the aldehyde or oxo group of donor with NAD+ or NADP+ as acceptor. The systematic name of this enzyme class is aldehyde:NAD+ oxidoreductase. Other names in common use include CoA-independent aldehyde dehydrogenase, m-methylbenzaldehyde dehydrogenase, NAD-aldehyde dehydrogenase, NAD-dependent 4-hydroxynonenal dehydrogenase, NAD-dependent aldehyde dehydrogenase, NAD-linked aldehyde dehydrogenase, propionaldehyde dehydrogenase, and aldehyde dehydrogenase (NAD). This enzyme participates in 17 metabolic pathways: glycolysis / gluconeogenesis, ascorbate and aldarate metabolism, fatty acid metabolism, bile acid biosynthesis, urea cycle and metabolism of amino groups, valine, leucine and isoleucine degradation, lysine degradation, histidine metabolism, tryptophan metabolism, beta-alanine metabolism, glycerolipid metabolism, pyruvate metabolism, 1,2-dichloroethane degradation, propanoate metabolism, 3-chloroacrylic acid degradation, butanoate metabolism, and limonene and pinene degradation.
