= Betaine—homocysteine S-methyltransferase =

Class of enzymes

betaine-homocysteine S-methyltransferase
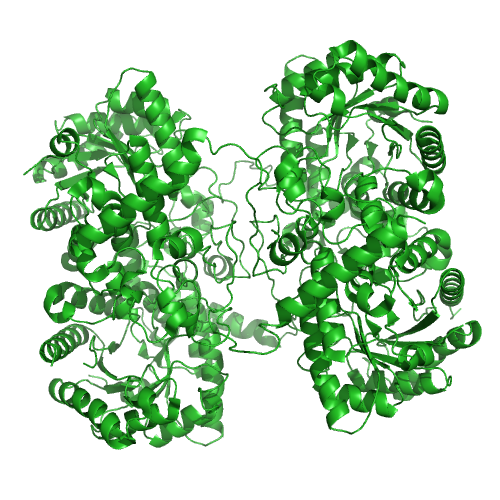
- Crystal structure of rat liver betaine homocysteine s-methyltransferase.

Identifiers
- EC no.: 2.1.1.5
- CAS no.: 9029-78-1

Databases
- BRENDA: enzyme data
- ExPASy: NiceZyme view
- KEGG: enzyme entry
- MetaCyc: metabolic pathway
- Rhea: reactions
- PDB structures: RCSB PDB PDBe PDBsum
- Gene Ontology: AmiGO / QuickGO
Search
- PMC: articles
- PubMed: articles
- NCBI: proteins

In enzymology, a betaine-homocysteine S-methyltransferase also known as betaine-homocysteine methyltransferase (BHMT) is a zinc metallo-enzyme that catalyzes the transfer of a methyl group from trimethylglycine and a hydrogen ion from homocysteine to produce dimethylglycine and methionine respectively:

trimethylglycine
+
L-homocysteine
dimethylglycine
+
L-methionine

BHMT belongs to the family of transferases, specifically those transferring one-carbon group methyltransferases. It participates in the metabolism of glycine, serine, threonine, and methionine.

== Isozymes ==
In humans, there are two isozymes, BHMT and BHMT2, each encoded by a separate gene.

betaine-homocysteine methyltransferase
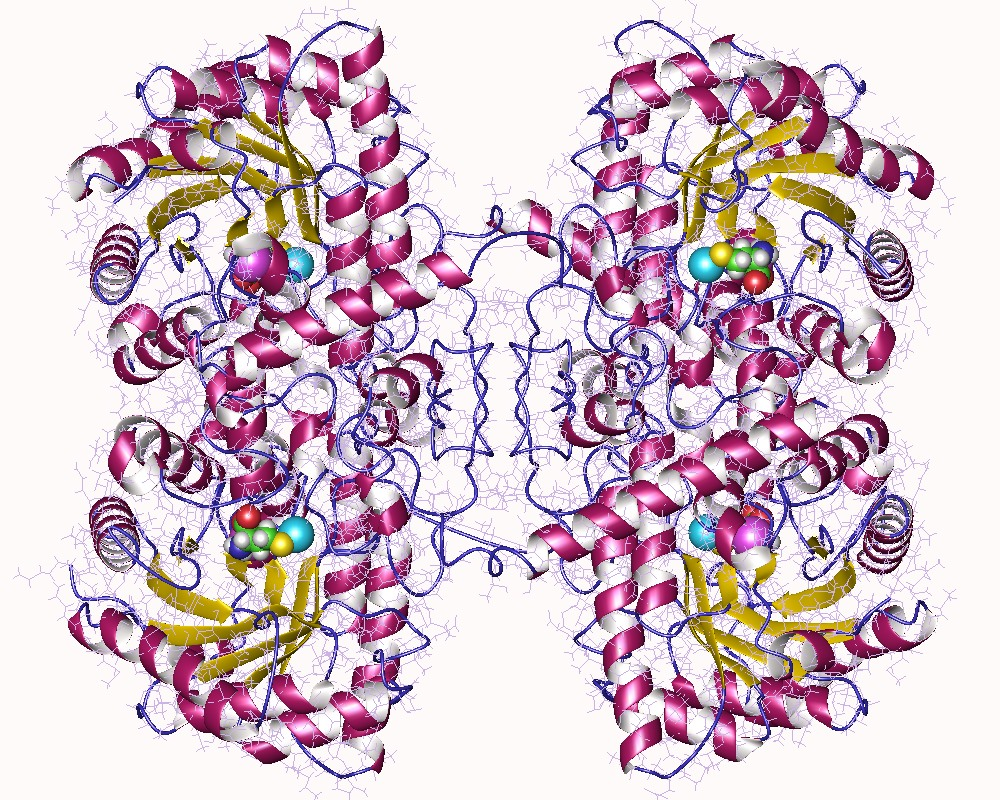
- Betaine--homocysteine S-methyltransferase 1 homotetramer, Human

Identifiers
- Symbol: BHMT
- NCBI gene: 635
- HGNC: 1047
- OMIM: 602888
- RefSeq: NM_001713
- UniProt: Q93088

Other data
- EC number: 2.1.1.5
- Locus: Chr. 5 q13.1-q15
Search for
- Structures: Swiss-model
- Domains: InterPro

betaine-homocysteine methyltransferase 2

Identifiers
- Symbol: BHMT2
- NCBI gene: 23743
- HGNC: 1048
- OMIM: 605932
- RefSeq: NM_017614
- UniProt: Q9H2M3

Other data
- EC number: 2.1.1.5
- Locus: Chr. 5 q13
Search for
- Structures: Swiss-model
- Domains: InterPro

== Tissue distribution ==
BHMT is expressed most predominantly in the liver and kidney.

== Clinical significance ==
Mutations in the BHMT gene are known to exist in humans. Anomalies may influence the metabolism of homocysteine, which is implicated in disorders ranging from vascular disease, autism, and schizophrenia to neural tube birth defects such as spina bifida.

== See also ==
- Betaine
