= Glycine betaine aldehyde =

Names
- IUPAC name N,N,N-Trimethylglycinium
- Systematic IUPAC name N,N,N-Trimethyl-2-oxoethan-1-aminium
- Other names Betaine aldehyde

Identifiers
CAS Number	7418-61-3; 7758-31-8 (chloride salt)
3D model (JSmol)	Interactive image
ChEBI	CHEBI:15710
ChemSpider	244
KEGG	C00576
PubChem CID	249
UNII	DEI7V5X7RB
CompTox Dashboard (EPA)	DTXSID20225152
- InChI: InChI=1/C5H12NO/c1-6(2,3)4-5-7/h5H,4H2,1-3H3/q+1 Key: SXKNCCSPZDCRFD-UHFFFAOYAL
- SMILES: O=CC[N+](C)(C)C

Properties
Chemical formula	C_{5}H_{12}NO
Molar mass	102.157 g·mol^{−1}
- Except where otherwise noted, data are given for materials in their standard state (at 25 °C [77 °F], 100 kPa). Infobox references

Glycine betaine aldehyde, often simply called betaine aldehyde, is an intermediate in the metabolism of glycine, serine and threonine. The human aldehyde dehydrogenase (EC 1.2.1.3) stimulates the transformation of betaine aldehyde to glycine betaine. Betaine aldehyde is a substrate for choline dehydrogenase (mitochondrial).

== Chemical structure ==
Glycine betaine aldehyde is a short chain aldehyde and quaternary ammonium compound. It can be considered a derivative of the amino acid glycine. Its chemical formula is C_{5}H_{12}NO^{+}.

== Biological function ==
Glycine betaine aldehyde is a component of glycine, serine and threonine metabolism. It also serves as an osmolyte.

It can be found in cytoplasm and mitochondria within the kidney, neurons, and stratum corneum.
