= Alberto Mantovani =

Italian physician and immunologist (born 1948)

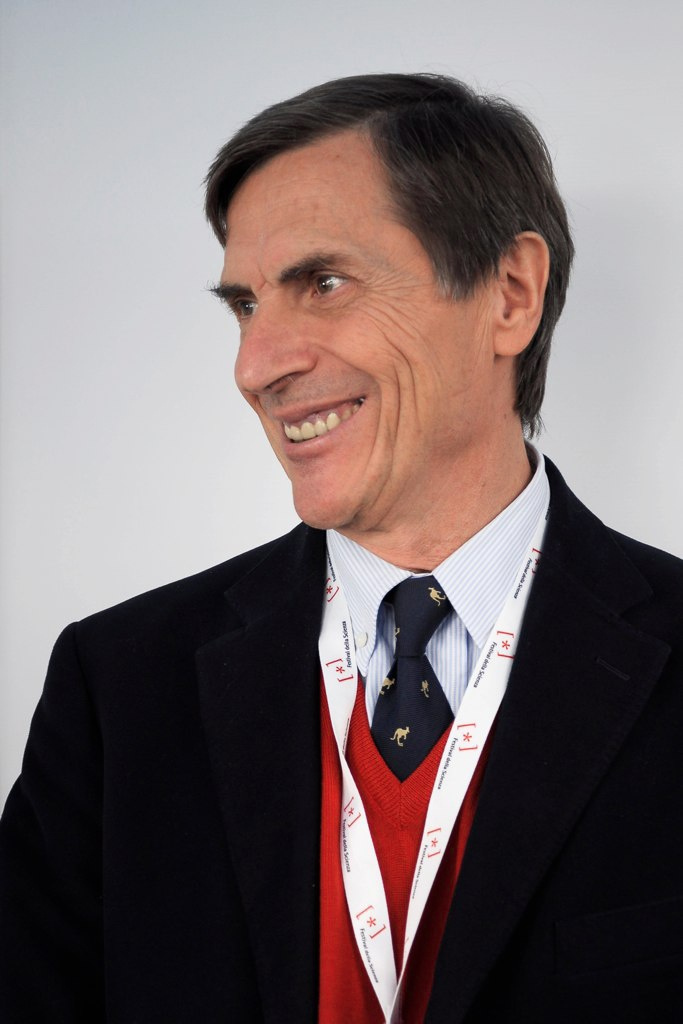
- Born: 29 October 1948 (age 78); Milan, Italy
- Education: University of Milan
- Known for: Tumor-associated macrophages; Decoy receptor; CCL2; PTX3
- Awards: Robert Koch Prize, see text for others
- Scientific career
- Fields: Immunology
- Workplaces: University of Milan; Humanitas University; University of Brescia; Mario Negri Institute for Pharmacological Research
- Website: Page at Humanitas

Alberto Mantovani Commendatore OMRI (born 29 October 1948) is an Italian physician and immunologist. He is Scientific Director of Istituto Clinico Humanitas (Humanitas Clinical and Research Centre), President and Founder of the Fondazione Humanitas per la Ricerca, and Professor of Pathology at the State University of Milan. He is known for his works on the roles of the immune system in the development of cancer. His research on tumour-associated macrophages (TAM, an acronym he coined) established inflammation as one of the causes of cancer. He was the first to identify monocyte chemotactic protein - 1 / CCL2 in 1983, and PTX3 in 1997. His works revealed the existence of decoy receptors in cell-signalling. He has been the most cited scientist in Italy, and one of the ten most cited immunologists worldwide.

== Biography ==
Mantovani was born in Milan on 29 October 1948. He studied medicine at the University of Milan and graduated (summa cum laude) in 1973. In 1976, he earned a specialization in oncology at the University of Pavia. Between 1973 and 1976, he worked as a visiting fellow at the Department of Tumour Immunology of the Chester Beatty Research Institute (now the Institute of Cancer Research) in Belmont, Sutton, England, where he continued the studies of Iwan Robert Evans and Peter Alexander. Between 1978 and 1979, he was a visiting fellow at the Laboratory of Immunodiagnosis at the National Institutes of Health in Bethesda, Maryland. In 1979, he was appointed Senior investigator in the Department of Tumour Immunology and Chemotherapy at the Istituto di Ricerche Farmacologiche "Mario Negri" in Milan. He became the Chief of Laboratory of the institute in 1981. In 1987, he worked at the Laboratory of Molecular Immunoregulation of NIH in Frederick, Maryland, as an Eleanor Roosevelt UICC Scholar. In 1994, he was promoted to Full Professor of General Pathology in the School of Medicine at the University of Brescia. He became Head of the Department of Immunology and Cell Biology at Istituto di Ricerche Farmacologiche "Mario Negri" in 1996. Between 2001 and 2014, he also served as Full Professor of General Pathology in the School of Medicine of the State University of Milan. Then he continued as Full Professor of General Pathology at Humanitas University in 2014. In 2005, he became the Scientific Director of Istituto Clinico Humanitas and President of Fondazione Humanitas per la Ricerca (under Humanitas University).

== Research activities ==
Following the deepening of the studies by Robert Evans and Peter Alexander on the role of macrophages in tumour formation, Mantovani discovered that macrophages, rather than helping to shrink the tumor, help it to grow and progress. He gave the acronym for such tumour-associated macrophages as TAM. His work in 2013 showed that targeting TAM is useful for cancer treatment. In 1983, his research team has discovered a protein, known as monocyte chemotactic protein - 1 / CCL2, which is part of the large superfamily of chemokines, which belong to the family of cytokines. His works help to establish the concept of "decoy receptors". From the study of the regulation of the cytokines, Mantovani was able to identify the operating principle of the decoy receptor for interleukin - 1. In 1993, his team showed interleukin-1 type II receptor acts as a decoy in the activity of interleukin 1. His team identified the first member of the long pentraxins, named PTX3 in 1997. The discovery was published in a series of papers. His team demonstrated in 2005 that the chemokine receptor D6 acts as a decoy and scavenger receptor for inflammatory chemokines. In 2015 his research, published in the journal Cell, showed that PTX3 gene is capable of curbing cancer by controlling inflammation.

== Works ==
- Tumor-Associated Leukocytes. 1994.
- Chemokines. 1999.
- Pharmacology of cytokines. 2000.
- Gianfranco Bazzoni; Elisabetta Dejana; Alberto Mantovani (2006). Piccin (ed.). L' endotelio. Fisiopatologia, basi molecolari, implicazioni terapeutiche. Padova. ISBN 978-88-299-1845-4.
- Targeted therapies in cancer: myth or reality?. Springer. 2008.
- Academic press, ed. (2013). Cancer Immunotherapy.
- Macrophages: biology and role in the pathology of diseases. Springer. 2014.
- I guardiani della vita. Milan: Baldini e Castoldi. 2014.
- Immunità e vaccini. Perché è giusto proteggere la nostra salute e quella dei nostri figli. Segrate: Mondadori. 2016.

== Scientific Publications ==
- Balkwill, Fran; Mantovani, Alberto (2001). "Inflammation and cancer: back to Virchow?". The Lancet. 357 (9255): 539–545. doi:10.1016/S0140-6736(00)04046-0. PMID 11229684. S2CID 1730949.
- Mantovani, Alberto; Allavena, Paola; Sica, Antonio; Balkwill, Frances (July 2008). "Cancer-related inflammation" (PDF). Nature. 454 (7203): 436–44. Bibcode:2008Natur.454..436M. doi:10.1038/nature07205. hdl:2434/145688. PMID 18650914. S2CID 4429118.
- Germano, Giovanni; Roberta Frapolli; Matteo Simone; Michele Tavecchio; Eugenio Erba; Samantha Pesce; Fabio Pasqualini; Federica Grosso; Roberta Sanfilippo; Paolo G Casali; Alessandro Gronchi; Emanuela Virdis; Eva Tarantino; Silvana Pilotti; Angela Greco; Manuela Nebuloni; Carlos Maria Galmarini; Juan Carlos Tercero; Alberto Mantovani; Maurizio D'Incalci; Paola Allavena (15 March 2010). "Antitumor and anti-inflammatory effects of trabectedin on human myxoid liposarcoma cells". Cancer Research. 70 (6): 2235–44. doi:10.1158/0008-5472.CAN-09-2335. hdl:2318/1740231. ISSN 1538-7445. PMID 20215499.
- Mantovani, Alberto (1 December 2010). "The growing diversity and spectrum of action of myeloid-derived suppressor cells". European Journal of Immunology. 40 (12): 3317–3320. doi:10.1002/eji.201041170. PMID 21110315.
- Allavena, P.; Mantovani, Alberto (1 February 2012). "Immunology in the clinic review series; focus on cancer: tumour-associated macrophages: undisputed stars of the inflammatory tumour microenvironment". Clinical & Experimental Immunology. 167 (2): 195–205. doi:10.1111/j.1365-2249.2011.04515.x. PMC 3278685. PMID 22235995.
- Galdiero, Maria Rosaria; Bonavita, Eduardo; Barajon, Isabella; Garlanda, Cecilia; Mantovani, Alberto; Jaillon, Sébastien (1 November 2013). "Tumor associated macrophages and neutrophils in cancer". Immunobiology. 218 (11): 1402–1410. doi:10.1016/j.imbio.2013.06.003. PMID 23891329.

== Awards ==
- 1998 - Biotech Award, Amgen - Dompe' - Vector Securities International,
- 2000 - Marie T. Bonazinga Award, Boston, USA
- 2004 - Guido Venosta Award, Italian Foundation for Cancer Research
- 2006 - European Immunology Award, European Immunology Societies
- 2007 - Galileo Galilei Prize for Research in Biomedical Sciences
- 2007 - PISO Award
- 2009 - William Harvey Medal, William Harvey Research Institute
- 2011 - IMID Award for Excellence in Immunology
- 2013 - Rusconi Lecture, Anna Villa e Felice Rusconi Foundation and University of Insubria
- 2014 - Rosa Camuna Prize, Lombardy Region
- 2014 - Barbara Baldacci Award, University of Bari
- 2015 - Milstein Award, International Cytokine and Interferon Society (ICIS)
- 2015 - Ferrari Soave Award, Academy of Sciences of Turin
- 2015 - The Albert Struyvenberg Medal, European Society of Clinical Investigation
- 2016 - OECI Oncology Prize, Organization of European Cancer Institutes
- 2016 - Robert Koch Prize, Robert Koch Foundation
- 2016 - Merck Serono Literary Prize
- 2016 - Feltrinelli Prize, Lincean Academy
- 2019 - Pezcoller Foundation-AACR International Award for Cancer Research

== Honours ==
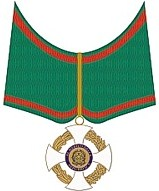

Mantovani was appointed "Commander" of the Order of Merit of the Italian Republic in 2005. He was Fellow of the Italian Association Against Leukemias in 1973, and Fellow of the Anna Villa Rusconi Foundation in 1974. He was vice-president/president the International Union of Immunological Societies from 2013 to 2016. He served on the board of the Global Alliance for Vaccines and Immunization (GAVI) between 2007 and 2010. He was president of the International Cytokine Society during 2009–2010.
