= CD121 =

CD121 may refer to:

- IL1R1
- IL1R2
