= NPTXR =

Protein-coding gene in the species Homo sapiens

Identifiers
- Aliases: NPTXR, NPR, neuronal pentraxin receptor
- External IDs: OMIM: 609474; MGI: 1920590; HomoloGene: 8620; GeneCards: NPTXR; OMA:NPTXR - orthologs

Gene location (Human)
Chr.	Chromosome 22 (human)
Band	22q13.1	Start	38,818,452 bp
Band	22q13.1	End	38,844,028 bp

Gene location (Mouse)
Chr.	Chromosome 15 (mouse)
Band	15 E1|15 37.85 cM	Start	79,670,552 bp
Band	15 E1|15 37.85 cM	End	79,688,967 bp
RNA expression pattern
Bgee	Human / Mouse (ortholog); Top expressed in: Brodmann area 10; frontal pole; Region I of hippocampus proper; right frontal lobe; cingulate gyrus; anterior cingulate cortex; dorsolateral prefrontal cortex; amygdala; Brodmann area 9; orbitofrontal cortex / Top expressed in: piriform cortex; subiculum; dentate gyrus of hippocampal formation granule cell; primary visual cortex; anterior amygdaloid area; superior frontal gyrus; habenula; primary motor cortex; cingulate gyrus; medial dorsal nucleus; More reference expression data
BioGPS	n/a
Gene ontology
Molecular function	metal ion binding
Cellular component	membrane; integral component of membrane; plasma membrane; cytoplasmic side of plasma membrane; filopodium; dendrite; growth cone; soma; glutamatergic synapse
Biological process	neuron projection development; regulation of postsynaptic neurotransmitter receptor activity
Sources:Amigo / QuickGO
Orthologs
Species	Human	Mouse
Entrez	23467	73340
Ensembl	ENSG00000221890	ENSMUSG00000022421
UniProt	O95502	Q99J85
RefSeq (mRNA)	NM_058178; NM_014293	NM_030689
RefSeq (protein)	NP_055108	n/a
Location (UCSC)	Chr 22: 38.82 – 38.84 Mb	Chr 15: 79.67 – 79.69 Mb
PubMed search
- Wikidata
View/Edit Human	View/Edit Mouse

Neuronal pentraxin receptor is a protein that in humans is encoded by the NPTXR gene.

This gene encodes a protein similar to the rat neuronal pentraxin receptor. The rat protein pentraxin is thought to mediate neuronal uptake of synaptic material and the presynaptic snake venom toxin, taipoxin. Studies in rat indicate that translation of this mRNA initiates at a non-AUG (CUG) codon. This may also be true for human and mouse, based on strong sequence conservation amongst these species.

== See also ==
- NPTX2, Neuronal pentraxin II
