= Turbidimetric inhibition immunoassay =

Biochemical technique

Turbidimetric inhibition immuno assay (TINIA) is a type of immunoassay that uses turbidimetry as the measurement principle and is used for many commercial immunoassays, e.g. measurement of HbA1c%, Digoxin etc. in whole blood sample in several commercial assays employ this principle.
