= NPTX1 =

Protein-coding gene in the species Homo sapiens

Identifiers
- Aliases: NPTX1, NP1, neuronal pentraxin 1
- External IDs: OMIM: 602367; MGI: 107811; GeneCards: NPTX1

Gene location (Human)
Chr.	Chromosome 17 (human)
Band	17q25.3	Start	80,466,834 bp
Band	17q25.3	End	80,477,843 bp

Gene location (Mouse)
Chr.	Chromosome 11 (mouse)
Band	11 E2|11 83.95 cM	Start	119,429,545 bp
Band	11 E2|11 83.95 cM	End	119,438,579 bp
RNA expression pattern
Bgee	Human / Mouse (ortholog); Top expressed in: cerebellar vermis; paraflocculus of cerebellum; middle temporal gyrus; frontal pole; right hemisphere of cerebellum; parietal lobe; postcentral gyrus; superior frontal gyrus; Brodmann area 10; orbitofrontal cortex / Top expressed in: lobe of cerebellum; cerebellar vermis; dentate gyrus of hippocampal formation granule cell; primary motor cortex; subiculum; habenula; prefrontal cortex; ventromedial nucleus; anterior amygdaloid area; hippocampus proper; More reference expression data
BioGPS	n/a
Gene ontology
Molecular function	metal ion binding
Cellular component	transport vesicle; cytoplasmic vesicle; plasma membrane; neuron projection; glutamatergic synapse
Biological process	central nervous system development; axonogenesis involved in innervation; chemical synaptic transmission; regulation of postsynaptic neurotransmitter receptor activity
Sources:Amigo / QuickGO
Orthologs
Databases	NCBI: entry; OMA: entry
Species	Human	Mouse
Entrez	4884	18164
Ensembl	ENSG00000171246	ENSMUSG00000025582
UniProt	Q15818	Q62443
RefSeq (mRNA)	NM_002522	NM_008730
RefSeq (protein)	NP_002513	NP_032756
Location (UCSC)	Chr 17: 80.47 – 80.48 Mb	Chr 11: 119.43 – 119.44 Mb
PubMed search
- Wikidata
View/Edit Human	View/Edit Mouse

Neuronal pentraxin-1 (NP1) is a protein that in humans is encoded by the NPTX1 gene.

== Function ==
NPTX1 is a member of the neuronal pentraxin gene family. Neuronal pentraxin 1 is similar to the rat NP1 gene which encodes a binding protein for the snake venom toxin taipoxin. Human NPTX1 mRNA is exclusively localized to the nervous system.
