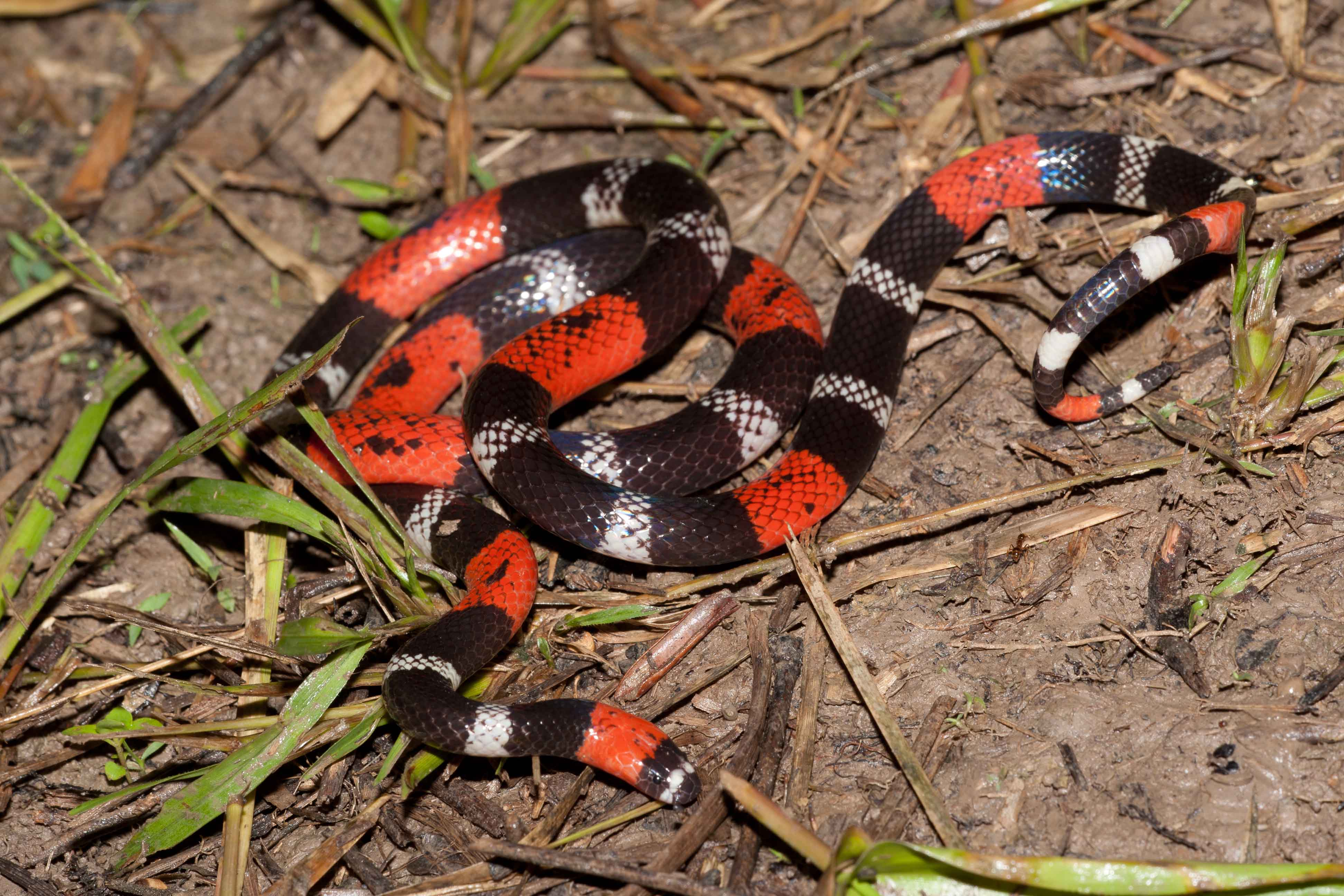

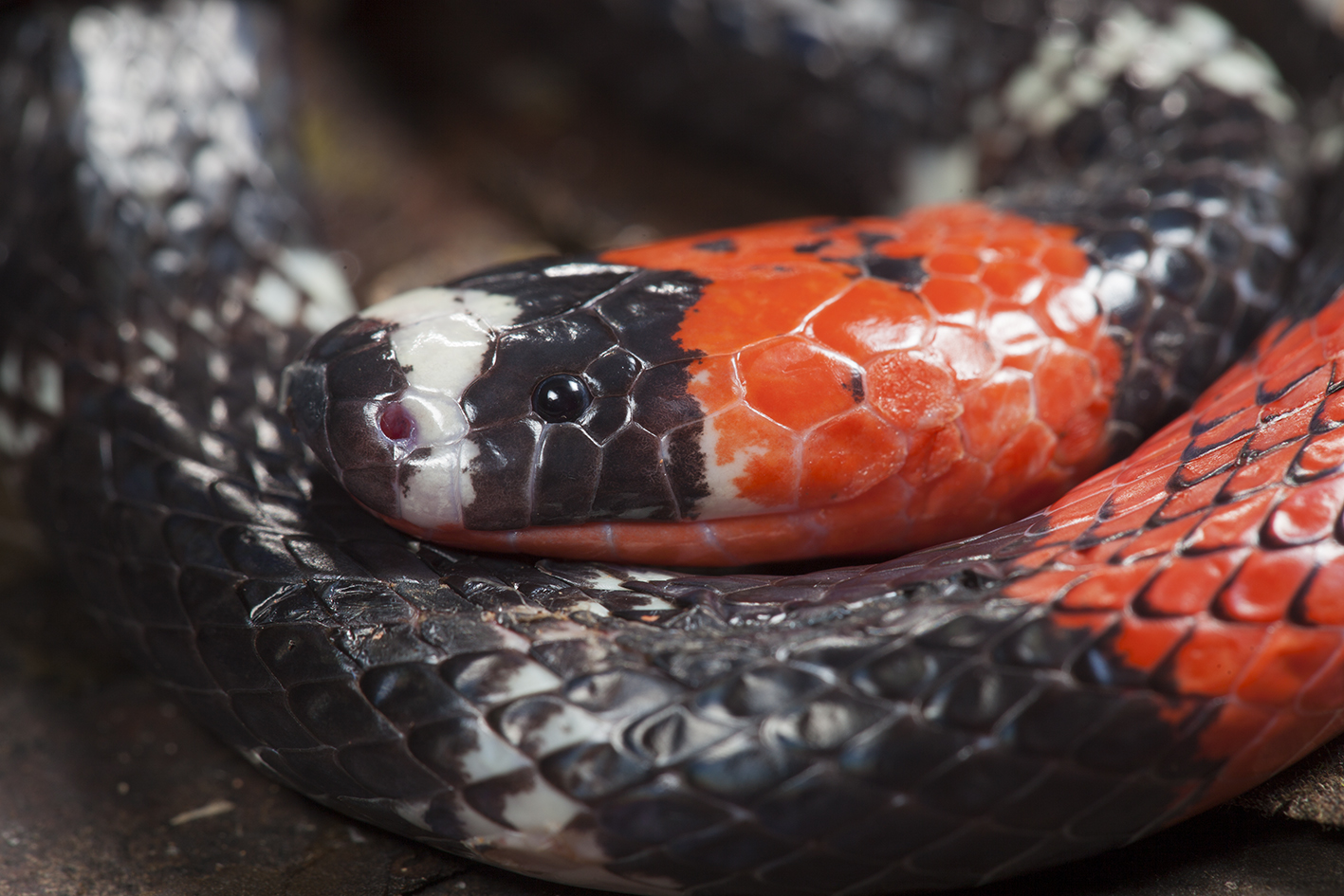

Conservation status
- Least Concern (IUCN 3.1)

Scientific classification
- Kingdom: Animalia
- Phylum: Chordata
- Class: Reptilia
- Order: Squamata
- Suborder: Serpentes
- Family: Elapidae
- Genus: Micrurus
- Species: M. lemniscatus

Binomial name
- Micrurus lemniscatus (Linnaeus, 1758)
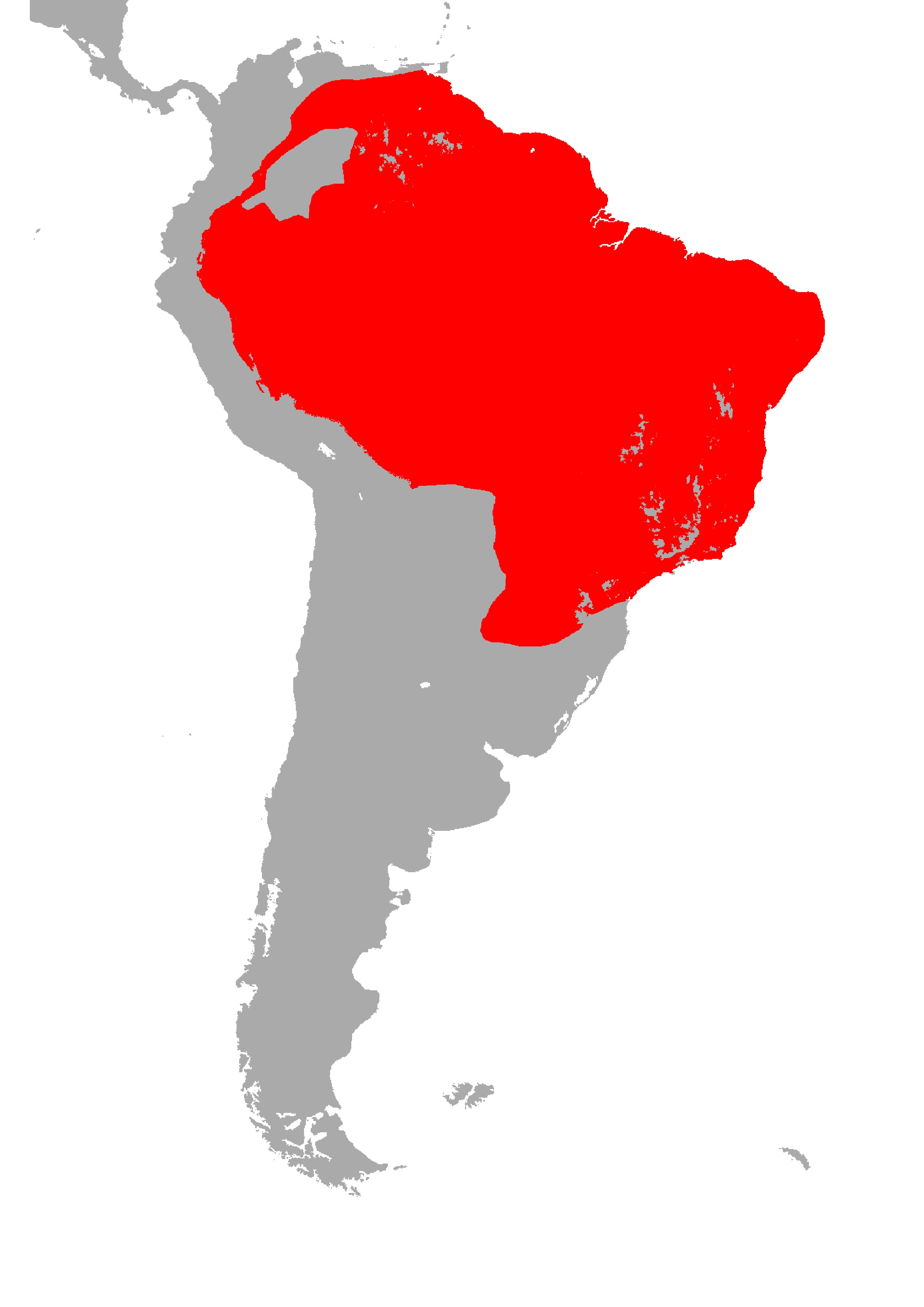

Synonyms
- Coluber lemniscatus Linnaeus, 1758; Elaps lemniscatus — A.M.C. Duméril, Bibron & A.H.A. Duméril, 1854; Elaps heterochilus Boulenger, 1896; Elaps gravenhorstii Boulenger, 1896; Micrurus lemniscatus — Beebe, 1919; Micrurus helleri K.P. Schmidt & F.J.W. Schmidt, 1925; Elaps frontifasciatus F. Werner, 1927

= Micrurus lemniscatus =

Species of snake

Micrurus lemniscatus, commonly known as the South American coral snake, is a species of venomous snake in the family Elapidae. The species is endemic to South America.

== Description ==
Micrurus lemniscatus is a thin and brightly colored species. Adults usually have a total length (tail included) of 60–90 cm (24–35 in), but the maximum reported total length is 145 cm (57 in). The snout is black, followed by a narrow white crossband in front of the eyes, then a wider black band including the eyes. The eyes are small, and the rest of the head is red. The body pattern consists of slightly broad red rings that are separated by seven to 17 triads of three black and two white rings. The tail has two triads.

== Behavior ==
Like many coral snakes, Micrurus lemniscatus is nocturnal and terrestrial, digging in loose soil or litter. It is not aggressive towards humans, although it can attack to defend itself.

== Reproduction ==
Breeding of Micrurus lemniscatus is oviparous, having a clutch size of possibly 20 eggs.

== Diet ==
Alimentation of Micrurus lemniscatus is mainly long-bodied vertebrates such as freshwater eels, gymnotiform fishes, caecilians, lizards, and snakes.

== Geographic range ==
Micrurus lemniscatus is found in Argentina, northern Bolivia, Brazil, Colombia, eastern Ecuador, French Guiana, Guyana, Paraguay, eastern Peru, Suriname, Trinidad, and Venezuela.

== Habitat ==
Micrurus lemniscatus is a widespread species in South America, living in humid forests and lowland forests, in open savannas and gallery forests. It is also found in lowland floodplains, deforested areas or near human habitation, in humid areas or near places with a water source. It occurs from near sea level to an altitude of 1,000 m (3,300 ft).

== Venom ==
The venom of Micrurus lemniscatus is a potent post- and pre-synaptic neurotoxin, which causes a potent and irreversible neuromuscular block in vertebrates. Lemnitoxin, a potent myotoxic PLA2 type toxin, isolated from the venom of M. lemniscatus induces local and systemic myotoxicity after intramuscular and intravenous injection in mice, which is antigenically related to Micrurus nigrocinctus nigroxin, Notechis scutatus notexin, mulgotoxin of Pseudechis australis and textilotoxin of Pseudonaja textilis.

The estimated lethal dose of M. lemniscatus venom for an adult human is 5–7 mg (dry weight). When live specimens of M. lemniscatus were "milked" in a laboratory, the average venom yield was 8–10 mg and the maximum yield was 27 mg.
