= C16H24N2O6 =

The molecular formula C_{16}H_{24}N_{2}O_{6} (molar mass: 340.37 g/mol, exact mass: 340.1634 u) may refer to:

- CPHPC
- Pirisudanol
