= Serum amyloid P component =

Protein found in humans

APCS
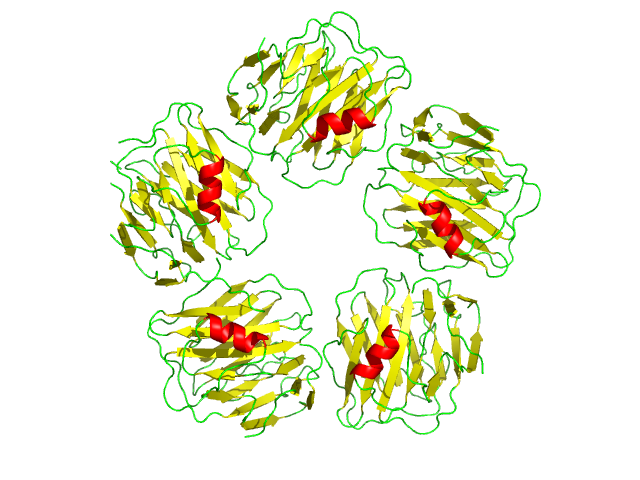

Identifiers
- Aliases: APCS, HEL-S-92n, PTX2, SAP, amyloid P component, serum
- External IDs: OMIM: 104770; MGI: 98229; GeneCards: APCS
Available structures
| PDB | Ortholog search: PDBe RCSB |
| PDB | List of PDB id codes 4AYU, 1GYK, 1LGN, 1SAC, 2A3W, 2A3X, 2A3Y, 2W08, 3D5O, 3KQR, 4AVS, 4AVT, 4AVV |

Gene location (Human)
| Chr. | Chromosome 1 (human) |
| Band | 1q23.2 | Start | 159,587,826 bp |
| Band | 1q23.2 | End | 159,588,865 bp |

Gene location (Mouse)
| Chr. | Chromosome 1 (mouse) |
| Band | 1 H3|1 80.33 cM | Start | 172,721,528 bp |
| Band | 1 H3|1 80.33 cM | End | 172,722,608 bp |
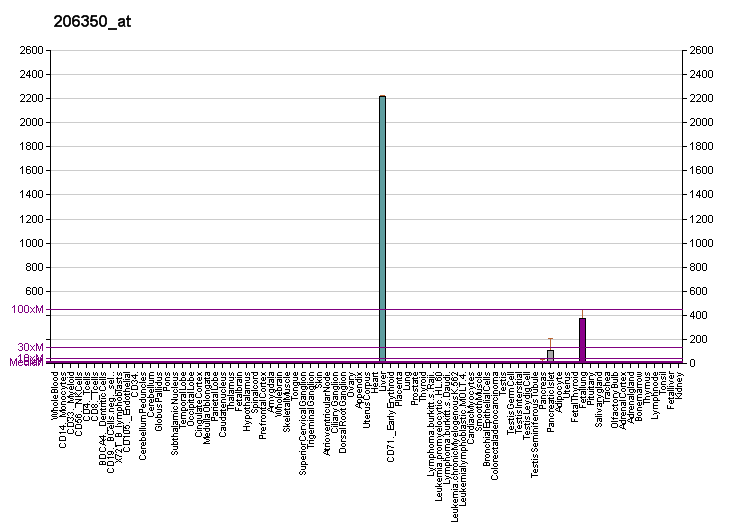
RNA expression pattern
| Bgee | Human / Mouse (ortholog); Top expressed in: right lobe of liver; gallbladder; islet of Langerhans; pancreatic ductal cell; body of pancreas; skin of thigh; human kidney; cervix; ectocervix; Descending thoracic aorta / Top expressed in: left lobe of liver; sexually immature organism; right kidney; epithelium of small intestine; human fetus; migratory enteric neural crest cell; ureter; atrioventricular junction; thoracic diaphragm; abdominal wall; More reference expression data |
| BioGPS | More reference expression data |
Gene ontology
| Molecular function | calcium ion binding; unfolded protein binding; metal ion binding; virion binding; complement component C1q complex binding; carbohydrate binding; identical protein binding; low-density lipoprotein particle binding |
| Cellular component | blood microparticle; extracellular matrix; extracellular exosome; nucleus; extracellular space; extracellular region; collagen-containing extracellular matrix |
| Biological process | negative regulation of monocyte differentiation; negative regulation of acute inflammatory response; negative regulation of viral entry into host cell; chaperone-mediated protein complex assembly; negative regulation of viral process; negative regulation of glycoprotein metabolic process; protein folding; acute-phase response; negative regulation of exo-alpha-sialidase activity; negative regulation of wound healing; innate immune response; complement activation, classical pathway |
Sources:Amigo / QuickGO
Orthologs
| Databases | NCBI: entry; OMA: entry |
| Species | Human | Mouse |
| Entrez | 325 | 20219 |
| Ensembl | ENSG00000132703 | ENSMUSG00000026542 |
| UniProt | P02743 | P12246 |
| RefSeq (mRNA) | NM_001639 | NM_011318 |
| RefSeq (protein) | NP_001630 | NP_035448 |
| Location (UCSC) | Chr 1: 159.59 – 159.59 Mb | Chr 1: 172.72 – 172.72 Mb |
| PubMed search |
- Wikidata
| View/Edit Human | View/Edit Mouse |

The serum amyloid P component (SAP) is the identical serum form of the amyloid P component (AP), a 25 kDa pentameric protein first identified as the pentagonal constituent of in vivo pathological deposits called "amyloid". APCS is its human gene.

== In amyloidosis ==
SAP makes up 14% of the dry mass of amyloid deposits and is thought to be an important contributor to the pathogenesis of a related group of diseases called the Amyloidoses. These conditions are characterised by the ordered aggregation of normal globular proteins and peptides into insoluble fibres, which disrupt tissue architecture and are associated with cell death. Contributing to its role in pattern recognition immune clearance, SAP binds in a calcium dependent manner to complement component C1q and the antibody binding region of immunoglobulins (Fab). SAP is thought to decorate and stabilise aggregates by preventing proteolytic cleavage and hence inhibiting fibril removal via the normal protein scavenging mechanisms. This association is utilised in the routine clinical diagnostic technique of SAP scintigraphy whereby radio-labelled protein is injected into patients to locate areas of amyloid deposition. The SAP-amyloid association has also been identified as a possible drug target for anti-amyloid therapy, with the recent development and first stage clinical trials of a compound called CPHPC (R-1-[6-[R-2-carboxy-pyrrolidin-1-yl]-6-oxohexanoyl] pyrrolidine-2-carboxylic acid), a small molecule able to strip AP from deposits by reducing levels of circulating SAP.

== Structure ==
SAP is a member of the pentraxins family, characterised by calcium-dependent ligand binding and a distinctive flattened β-jellyroll structure similar to that of the legume lectins. The name "pentraxin" is derived from the Greek words for five (penta) and berries (ragos), relating to the radial symmetry of five monomers forming a ring approximately 95 across and 35 deep. Human SAP has 51% sequence homology with C-reactive protein (CRP), a classical acute phase response plasma protein, and is a more distant relative to the "long" pentraxins such as PTX3 (a cytokine-modulated molecule) and several neuronal pentraxins. Both SAP and CRP are evolutionary conserved in all vertebrates and are also found in distant invertebrates such as the horseshoe crab (Limulus polyphemus).
