= NPTX2 =

Protein-coding gene in the species Homo sapiens

Identifiers
- Aliases: NPTX2, NARP, NP-II, NP2, neuronal pentraxin 2
- External IDs: OMIM: 600750; MGI: 1858209; GeneCards: NPTX2

Gene location (Human)
Chr.	Chromosome 7 (human)
Band	7q22.1	Start	98,617,285 bp
Band	7q22.1	End	98,629,869 bp

Gene location (Mouse)
Chr.	Chromosome 5 (mouse)
Band	5 G2|5 84.58 cM	Start	144,482,712 bp
Band	5 G2|5 84.58 cM	End	144,494,288 bp
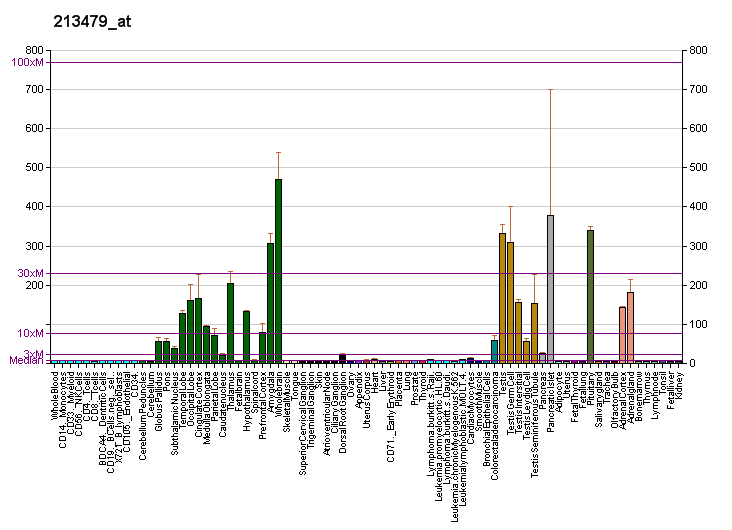
RNA expression pattern
Bgee	Human / Mouse (ortholog); Top expressed in: beta cell; anterior pituitary; orbitofrontal cortex; Brodmann area 46; lateral nuclear group of thalamus; postcentral gyrus; prefrontal cortex; right testis; Brodmann area 10; Descending thoracic aorta / Top expressed in: lumbar spinal ganglion; superior frontal gyrus; primary visual cortex; primary oocyte; secondary oocyte; prefrontal cortex; neural layer of retina; zygote; habenula; epiblast; More reference expression data
BioGPS	More reference expression data
Gene ontology
Molecular function	metal ion binding; carbohydrate binding; molecular function
Cellular component	extracellular region; cellular component; plasma membrane; cytoplasmic side of plasma membrane; filopodium; dendrite; growth cone; soma; glutamatergic synapse
Biological process	associative learning; chemical synaptic transmission; neuron projection development; regulation of postsynaptic neurotransmitter receptor activity
Sources:Amigo / QuickGO
Orthologs
Databases	NCBI: entry; OMA: entry
Species	Human	Mouse
Entrez	4885	53324
Ensembl	ENSG00000106236	ENSMUSG00000059991
UniProt	P47972	O70340
RefSeq (mRNA)	NM_002523	NM_016789
RefSeq (protein)	NP_002514	NP_058069
Location (UCSC)	Chr 7: 98.62 – 98.63 Mb	Chr 5: 144.48 – 144.49 Mb
PubMed search
- Wikidata
View/Edit Human	View/Edit Mouse

Neuronal pentraxin-2 is a protein that in humans is encoded by the NPTX2 gene.

== Function ==
This gene encodes a member of the family of neuronal pentraxins, synaptic proteins that are related to C-reactive protein. This protein is involved in excitatory synapse formation. It also plays a role in clustering of alpha-amino-3-hydroxy-5-methyl-4-isoxazolepropionic acid (AMPA)-type glutamate receptors at established synapses, resulting in non-apoptotic cell death of dopaminergic nerve cells.

== Clinical significance ==
Up-regulation of this gene in Parkinson disease (PD) tissues suggests that the protein may be involved in the pathology of PD
