= PTX3 =

Identifiers
- Aliases: PTX3, TNFAIP5, TSG-14, pentraxin 3
- External IDs: OMIM: 602492; MGI: 104641; GeneCards: PTX3

Gene location (Human)
Chr.	Chromosome 3 (human)
Band	3q25.32	Start	157,436,850 bp
Band	3q25.32	End	157,443,633 bp

Gene location (Mouse)
Chr.	Chromosome 3 (mouse)
Band	3 E1|3 30.25 cM	Start	66,127,331 bp
Band	3 E1|3 30.25 cM	End	66,133,226 bp
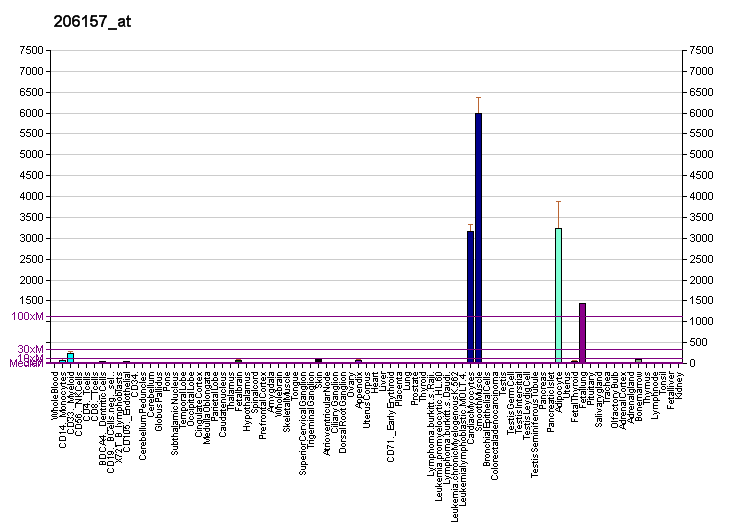
RNA expression pattern
Bgee	Human / Mouse (ortholog); Top expressed in: cartilage tissue; pericardium; trabecular bone; bone marrow; tibia; testicle; gastric mucosa; lower lobe of lung; bone marrow cell; stromal cell of endometrium / Top expressed in: stroma of bone marrow; gastrula; dermis; triceps brachii muscle; sternocleidomastoid muscle; temporal muscle; vastus lateralis muscle; maxillary prominence; ventricular zone; calvaria; More reference expression data
BioGPS	More reference expression data
Gene ontology
Molecular function	(1->3)-beta-D-glucan binding; virion binding; complement component C1q complex binding; protein binding; identical protein binding
Cellular component	extracellular region; specific granule lumen; tertiary granule lumen; extracellular space; extracellular matrix
Biological process	positive regulation of nitric oxide biosynthetic process; negative regulation of glycoprotein metabolic process; positive regulation of phagocytosis; negative regulation of exo-alpha-sialidase activity; response to yeast; innate immune response; inflammatory response; opsonization; neutrophil degranulation; ovarian cumulus expansion; extracellular matrix organization
Sources:Amigo / QuickGO
Orthologs
Databases	NCBI: entry; OMA: entry
Species	Human	Mouse
Entrez	5806	19288
Ensembl	ENSG00000163661	ENSMUSG00000027832
UniProt	P26022	P48759
RefSeq (mRNA)	NM_002852	NM_008987
RefSeq (protein)	NP_002843	NP_033013
Location (UCSC)	Chr 3: 157.44 – 157.44 Mb	Chr 3: 66.13 – 66.13 Mb
PubMed search
- Wikidata
View/Edit Human	View/Edit Mouse

Pentraxin-related protein PTX3 also known as TNF-inducible gene 14 protein (TSG-14) is a protein that in humans is encoded by the PTX3 gene.

Pentraxin 3 (ptx3) is a member of the pentraxin superfamily. This super family characterized by cyclic multimeric structure. PTX3 is rapidly produced and released by several cell types, in particular by mononuclear phagocytes, dendritic cells (DCs), fibroblasts and endothelial cells in response to primary inflammatory signals [e.g., toll-like receptor (TLR) engagement, TNFα, IL-1β]. PTX3 binds with high affinity to the complement component C1q, the extracellular matrix component TNFα induced protein 6 (TNFAIP6; also called TNF-stimulated gene 6, TSG-6) and selected microorganisms, including Aspergillus fumigatus and Pseudomonas aeruginosa.

PTX3 activates the classical pathway of complement activation and facilitates pathogen recognition by macrophages and DCs.

== Structure ==
Human and murine PTX3, localized in the syntenic region of chromosome 3 (q24-28), are highly conserved, sharing 82% identical and 92% conserved amino acids. The human PTX3 gene is organized into three exons coding for the leader peptide (which is cleaved from the mature protein), the amino-terminal domain and the pentraxin domain of the protein.

The transcribed PTX3 protein is 381 amino acids long, has a predicted molecular weight of 40,165 Da and consists of a carboxy-terminal 203 amino acid long pentraxin domain coupled with an amino-terminal 178 amino acid long domain unrelated to other known proteins. The PTX3 carboxy-terminal domain contains a canonical pentraxin signature (HxCxS/TWxS) and two conserved cysteines (Cys-210 and Cys-271), and shares 57% conserved and 17% identical amino acids with short pentraxins. The presence of an amino-linked glycosylation site in the carboxy-terminal domain at Asn-220 accounts for the higher molecular weight observed in SDS–PAGE under reducing conditions (45 kDa as opposed to the predicted 40 kDa). Under native conditions PTX3 protomers are assembled to form multimers. The crystal structure of PTX3 has not been determined yet, however according to modeling, the PTX3 pentraxin domain well-accommodates on the tertiary fold of SAP, with almost all of the β-strands and the α-helical segments conserved.

== PTX3 in blood ==
PTX3 behaves as an acute phase response protein, as the blood levels of PTX3, low in normal conditions (about 25 ng/mL in the mouse, < 2 ng/mL in humans), increase rapidly (peaking at 6–8 h after induction) and dramatically (200–800 ng/mL) during endotoxic shock, sepsis and other inflammatory and infectious conditions, correlating with the severity of the disease. PTX3 levels in cerebrospinal fluid help distinguishing between bacterial and aseptic meningoencephalitis. Under these conditions, PTX3 is a rapid marker for primary local activation of innate immunity and inflammation.

== Pathogen versus apoptotic self recognition ==
Similar to other members of the pentraxin family PTX3 binds apoptotic cells, thereby inhibiting their recognition by DCs. Binding occurs late in the apoptotic process and enhances cytokine production by DCs. In addition, preincubation of apoptotic cells with PTX3 enhances C1q binding and C3 deposition on the cell surface, suggesting a role for PTX3 in the complement-mediated clearance of apoptotic cells. Moreover, in the presence of dying cells, PTX3 restricts the cross presentation of antigens derived from dying cells. These results suggest that PTX3 has a dual role: protection against pathogens and control of autoimmunity.
