= C-reactive protein =

Mammalian protein found in humans

CRP
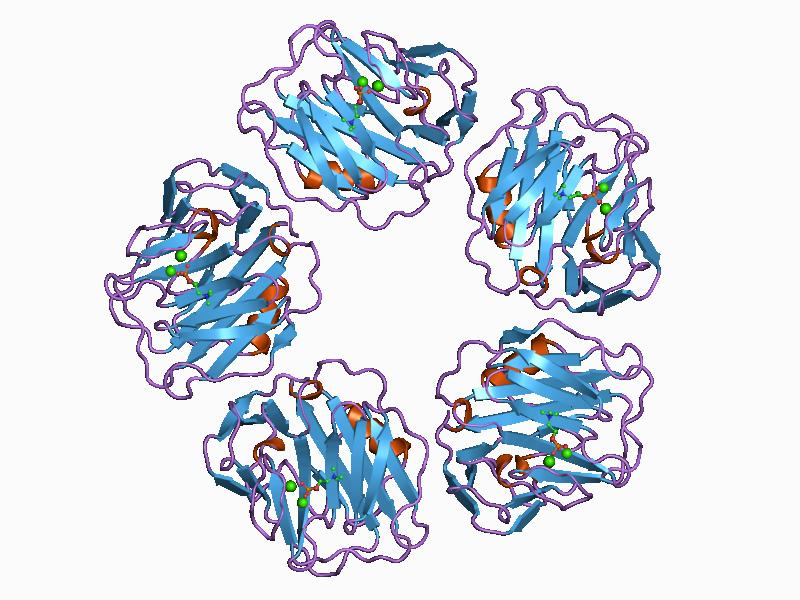

Identifiers
- Aliases: CRP, PTX1, C-reactive protein, pentraxin-related, C-Reactive Protein
- External IDs: OMIM: 123260; MGI: 88512; GeneCards: CRP
Available structures
PDB	Ortholog search: PDBe RCSB
PDB	List of PDB id codes 1B09, 1GNH, 1LJ7, 3L2Y, 3PVN, 3PVO

Gene location (Human)
Chr.	Chromosome 1 (human)
Band	1q23.2	Start	159,712,289 bp
Band	1q23.2	End	159,714,589 bp

Gene location (Mouse)
Chr.	Chromosome 1 (mouse)
Band	1 H3|1 80.13 cM	Start	172,525,622 bp
Band	1 H3|1 80.13 cM	End	172,660,598 bp
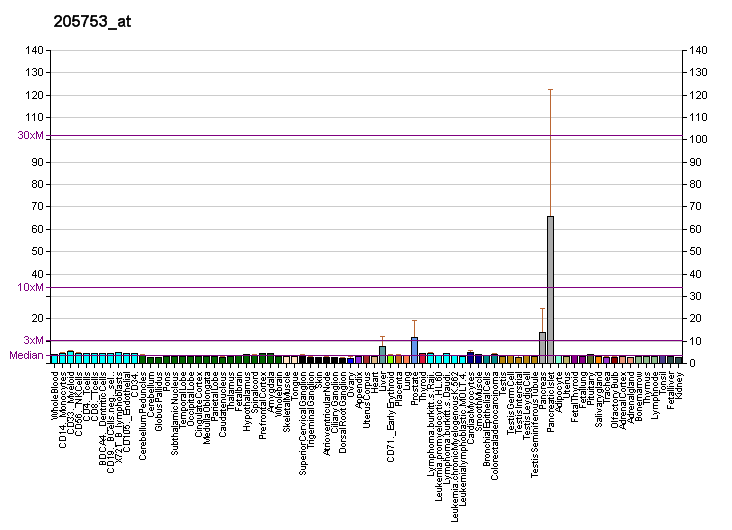

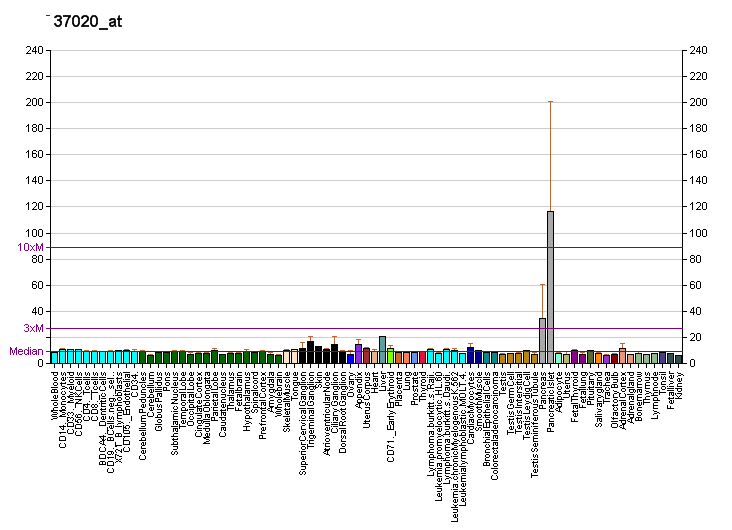
RNA expression pattern
Bgee	Human / Mouse (ortholog); Top expressed in: right lobe of liver; islet of Langerhans; gallbladder; gonad; testicle; body of pancreas; pancreatic epithelial cell; right coronary artery; ectocervix; epithelium of colon / Top expressed in: left lobe of liver; efferent ductule; sexually immature organism; human fetus; vas deferens; lumbar subsegment of spinal cord; thymus; lumbar spinal ganglion; epididymis; digastric muscle; More reference expression data
BioGPS	More reference expression data
Gene ontology
Molecular function	low-density lipoprotein particle receptor binding; calcium ion binding; virion binding; complement component C1q complex binding; protein binding; metal ion binding; low-density lipoprotein particle binding; choline binding; identical protein binding
Cellular component	extracellular region; extracellular space
Biological process	negative regulation of lipid storage; positive regulation of superoxide anion generation; positive regulation of gene expression; inflammatory response; acute-phase response; negative regulation of macrophage derived foam cell differentiation; opsonization; defense response to Gram-positive bacterium; complement activation, classical pathway; innate immune response
Sources:Amigo / QuickGO
Orthologs
Databases	NCBI: entry; OMA: entry
Species	Human	Mouse
Entrez	1401	12944
Ensembl	ENSG00000132693	ENSMUSG00000037942
UniProt	P02741	P14847
RefSeq (mRNA)	NM_000567; NM_001329057; NM_001329058; NM_001382703	NM_007768
RefSeq (protein)	NP_000558; NP_001315986; NP_001315987; NP_001369632	NP_031794
Location (UCSC)	Chr 1: 159.71 – 159.71 Mb	Chr 1: 172.53 – 172.66 Mb
PubMed search
- Wikidata
View/Edit Human	View/Edit Mouse

C-reactive protein (CRP) is an annular (ring-shaped) pentameric protein found in blood plasma, whose circulating concentration rises in response to inflammation. It is an acute-phase protein of hepatic origin that increases following interleukin-6 secretion by macrophages and T cells. Its physiological role is to bind to lysophosphatidylcholine expressed on the surface of dead or dying cells (and some types of bacteria) in order to activate the complement system via C1q.

CRP is synthesized by the liver in response to factors released by macrophages, T cells and fat cells (adipocytes). It is a member of the pentraxin family of proteins. It is not related to C-peptide (insulin) or protein C (blood coagulation). C-reactive protein was the first pattern recognition receptor (PRR) to be identified.

== History and etymology ==
Discovered by Tillett and Francis in 1930, it was initially thought that CRP might be a pathogenic secretion since it was elevated in a variety of illnesses, including cancer. The later discovery of hepatic synthesis (made in the liver) demonstrated that it is a native protein. Initially, CRP was measured using the quellung reaction which gave a positive or a negative result. More precise methods nowadays use dynamic light scattering after reaction with CRP-specific antibodies.

CRP was so named because it was first identified as a substance in the serum of patients with acute inflammation that reacted with the cell wall polysaccharide (C-polysaccharide) of pneumococcus.

== Genetics and structure ==
It is a member of the small pentraxins family (also known as short pentraxins). The polypeptide encoded by this gene has 224 amino acids. The full-length polypeptide is not present in the body in significant quantities due to signal peptide, which is removed by signal peptidase before translation is completed. The complete protein, composed of five monomers, has a total mass of approximately 120,000 Da. In serum, it assembles into stable pentameric structure with a discoid shape.

== Function ==
CRP binds to the phosphocholine expressed on the surface of bacterial cells such as pneumococcus bacteria. This activates the complement system, promoting phagocytosis by macrophages, which clears necrotic and apoptotic cells and bacteria. With this mechanism, CRP also binds to ischemic/hypoxic cells, which could regenerate with more time. However, the binding of CRP causes them to be disposed of prematurely. CRP binds to the Fc-gamma receptor IIa, to which IgG isotype antibodies also bind. In addition, CRP activates the classical complement pathway via C1q binding. CRP thus forms immune complexes in the same way as IgG antibodies.

This so-called acute phase response occurs as a result of increasing concentrations of interleukin-6 (IL-6), which is produced by macrophages as well as adipocytes in response to a wide range of acute and chronic inflammatory conditions such as bacterial, viral, or fungal infections; rheumatic and other inflammatory diseases; malignancy; and tissue injury and necrosis. These conditions cause release of IL-6 and other cytokines that trigger the synthesis of CRP and fibrinogen by the liver.

CRP binds to phosphocholine on micro-organisms. It is thought to assist in complement binding to foreign and damaged cells and enhances phagocytosis by macrophages (opsonin-mediated phagocytosis), which express a receptor for CRP. It plays a role in innate immunity as an early defense system against infections.

== Serum levels ==
C-reactive protein
- Purpose: Detection of inflammation in body.
- Test of: The amount of CRP in the blood.

=== Measurement methods ===
Traditional CRP measurement only detected CRP in the range of 10 to 1,000 mg/L, whereas high sensitivity CRP (hs-CRP) detects CRP in the range of 0.5 to 10 mg/L. hs-CRP can detect cardiovascular disease risk when in excess of 3 mg/L, whereas below 1 mg/L would be low risk. Traditional CRP measurement is faster and less costly than hs-CRP, and can be adequate for some applications, such as monitoring hemodialysis patients. Current immunoassay methods for CRP have similar precision to hsCRP performed by nephelometry and could probably replace hsCRP for cardiovascular risk assessment, however, in the United States this would represent off-label use, making it a laboratory-developed test under FDA regulations.

=== Normal ===
In healthy adults, the normal concentrations of CRP varies between 0.8 mg/L and 3.0 mg/L. However, some healthy adults show elevated CRP at 10 mg/L. CRP concentrations also increase with age, possibly due to subclinical conditions. Additionally, there are seasonal variations of CRP concentrations, with highest levels occurring in the winter. Gene polymorphism of interleukin-1 family, interleukin 6, and polymorphic GT repeat of the CRP gene do affect the usual CRP concentrations when a person does not have any medical illnesses.

=== Acute inflammation ===
When there is a stimulus, the CRP level can increase 10,000-fold from less than 50 μg/L to more than 500 mg/L. Its concentration can increase to 5 mg/L by 6 hours and peak at 48 hours. The plasma half-life of CRP is 19 hours, and is constant in all medical conditions. Therefore, the only factor that affects the blood CRP concentration is its production rate, which increases with inflammation, infection, trauma, necrosis, malignancy, and allergic reactions. Other inflammatory mediators that can increase CRP are TGF beta 1, and tumor necrosis factor alpha. In acute inflammation, CRP can increase as much as 50 to 100 mg/L within 4 to 6 hours in mild to moderate inflammation or an insult such as skin infection, cystitis, or bronchitis. It can double every 8 hours and reaches its peak at 36 to 50 hours following injury or inflammation. CRP between 100 and 500 mg/L is considered highly predictive of inflammation due to bacterial infection. Once inflammation subsides, CRP level falls quickly because of its relatively short half-life.

=== Metabolic inflammation ===
CRP concentrations between 2 and 10 mg/L are considered as metabolic inflammation: metabolic pathways that cause arteriosclerosis and type II diabetes mellitus.

== Clinical significance ==
=== Diagnostic use ===
CRP is used mainly as an inflammation marker. Apart from liver failure, there are few known factors that interfere with CRP production. Interferon alpha inhibits CRP production from liver cells which may explain the relatively low levels of CRP found during viral infections compared to bacterial infections

Measuring and charting CRP values can prove useful in determining disease progress or the effectiveness of treatments. ELISA and radial immunodiffusion methods are available for research use, while immunoturbidimetry is used clinically for CRP and nephelometry is typically used for hsCRP. Cutoffs for cardiovascular risk assessment have included:

- low: hs-CRP level under 1.0 mg/L
- average: between 1.0 and 3.0 mg/L
- high: above 3.0 mg/L

Normal levels increase with aging. Higher levels are found in late pregnant women, mild inflammation and viral infections (10–40 mg/L), active inflammation, bacterial infection (40–200 mg/L), severe bacterial infections and burns (>200 mg/L).

CRP cut-off levels indicating bacterial from non-bacterial illness can vary due to co-morbidities such as malaria, HIV and malnutrition and the stage of disease presentation. In patients presenting to the emergency department with suspected sepsis, a CRP/albumin ratio of less than 32 has a negative predictive value of 89% for ruling out sepsis.

CRP is a more sensitive and accurate reflection of the acute phase response than the ESR (erythrocyte sedimentation rate). ESR may be normal while CRP is elevated. CRP returns to normal more quickly than ESR in response to therapy.

=== Cardiovascular disease ===
Recent research suggests that patients with elevated basal levels of CRP are at an increased risk of diabetes, hypertension and cardiovascular disease. A study of over 700 nurses showed that those in the highest quartile of trans fat consumption had blood levels of CRP that were 73% higher than those in the lowest quartile. Although one group of researchers indicated that CRP may be only a moderate risk factor for cardiovascular disease, this study (known as the Reykjavik Study) was found to have some problems for this type of analysis related to the characteristics of the population studied, and there was an extremely long follow-up time, which may have attenuated the association between CRP and future outcomes. Others have shown that CRP can exacerbate ischemic necrosis in a complement-dependent fashion and that CRP inhibition can be a safe and effective therapy for myocardial and cerebral infarcts; this has been demonstrated in animal models and humans.

It has been hypothesized that patients with high CRP levels might benefit from use of statins. This is based on the JUPITER trial that found that elevated CRP levels without hyperlipidemia benefited. Statins were selected because they have been proven to reduce levels of CRP. Studies comparing effect of various statins in hs-CRP revealed similar effects of different statins. A subsequent trial however failed to find that CRP was useful for determining statin benefit.

In a meta-analysis of 20 studies involving 1,466 patients with coronary artery disease, CRP levels were found to be reduced after exercise interventions. Among those studies, higher CRP concentrations or poorer lipid profiles before beginning exercise were associated with greater reductions in CRP.

To clarify whether CRP is a bystander or active participant in atherogenesis, a 2008 study compared people with various genetic CRP variants. Those with a high CRP due to genetic variation had no increased risk of cardiovascular disease compared to those with a normal or low CRP. A study published in 2011 shows that CRP is associated with lipid responses to low-fat and high-polyunsaturated fat diets.

=== Coronary heart disease risk ===
Arterial damage results from white blood cell invasion and inflammation within the wall. CRP is a general marker for inflammation and infection, so it can be used as a very rough proxy for heart disease risk. Since many things can cause elevated CRP, this is not a very specific prognostic indicator. Nevertheless, a level above 2.4 mg/L has been associated with a doubled risk of a coronary event compared to levels below 1 mg/L; however, the study group in this case consisted of patients who had been diagnosed with unstable angina pectoris; whether elevated CRP has any predictive value of acute coronary events in the general population of all age ranges remains unclear. Currently, C-reactive protein is not recommended as a cardiovascular disease screening test for average-risk adults without symptoms.

The American Heart Association and U.S. Centers for Disease Control and Prevention have defined risk groups as follows:

- Low Risk: less than 1.0 mg/L
- Average risk: 1.0 to 3.0 mg/L
- High risk: above 3.0 mg/L

But hs-CRP is not to be used alone and should be combined with elevated levels of cholesterol, LDL-C, triglycerides, and glucose level. Smoking, hypertension and diabetes also increase the risk level of cardiovascular disease.

=== Fibrosis and inflammation ===
Scleroderma, polymyositis, and dermatomyositis elicit little or no CRP response. CRP levels also tend to remain low despite inflammatory activity in systemic lupus erythematosus (SLE) unless serositis or synovitis is present. This may be explained by increased levels of type I IFN in SLE, since type I IFN (i.e IFN alpha) inhibits hepatic CRP production. A polymorphisms of the CRP gene which cause lower CRP levels is also more frequent in SLE patients compared with controls. Elevations of CRP in the absence of clinically significant inflammation can occur in kidney failure. CRP level is an independent risk factor for atherosclerotic disease. Patients with high CRP concentrations are more likely to develop stroke, myocardial infarction, and severe peripheral vascular disease. Elevated level of CRP can also be observed in inflammatory bowel disease (IBD), including Crohn's disease and ulcerative colitis.

High levels of CRP has been associated to point mutation Cys130Arg in the APOE gene, coding for apolipoprotein E, establishing a link between lipid values and inflammatory markers modulation.

=== Cancer ===
The role of inflammation in cancer is not well understood. Some organs of the body show greater risk of cancer when they are chronically inflamed. While there is an association between increased levels of C-reactive protein and risk of developing cancer, there is no association between genetic polymorphisms influencing circulating levels of CRP and cancer risk.

In a 2004 prospective cohort study on colon cancer risk associated with CRP levels, people with colon cancer had higher average CRP concentrations than people without colon cancer. It can be noted that the average CRP levels in both groups were well within the range of CRP levels usually found in healthy people. However, these findings may suggest that low inflammation level can be associated with a lower risk of colon cancer, concurring with previous studies that indicate anti-inflammatory drugs could lower colon cancer risk.

=== Obstructive sleep apnea ===
C-reactive protein (CRP), a marker of systemic inflammation, is also increased in obstructive sleep apnea (OSA). CRP and interleukin-6 (IL-6) levels were significantly higher in patients with OSA compared to obese control subjects. Patients with OSA have higher plasma CRP concentrations that increased corresponding to the severity of their apnea-hypopnea index score. Treatment of OSA with CPAP (continuous positive airway pressure) significantly alleviated the effect of OSA on CRP and IL-6 levels.

=== Rheumatoid arthritis ===
In the context of rheumatoid arthritis (RA), CRP is one of the acute phase reactants, whose assessment is defined as part of the joint 2010 ACR/EULAR classification criteria for RA with abnormal levels accounting for a single point within the criteria. Higher levels of CRP are associated with more severe disease and a higher likelihood of radiographic progression. Rheumatoid arthritis associated antibodies together with 14-3-3η YWHAH have been reported to complement CRP in predicting clinical and radiographic outcomes in patients with recent onset inflammatory polyarthritis. Elevated levels of CRP appear to be associated with common comorbidities including cardiovascular disease, metabolic syndrome, diabetes and interstitial lung (pulmonary) disease. Mechanistically, CRP also appears to influence osteoclast activity leading to bone resorption and also stimulates RANKL expression in peripheral blood monocytes.

It has previously been speculated that single-nucleotide polymorphisms in the CRP gene may affect clinical decision-making based on CRP in rheumatoid arthritis, e.g. DAS28 (Disease Activity Score 28 joints). A recent study showed that CRP genotype and haplotype were only marginally associated with serum CRP levels and without any association to the DAS28 score. Thus, that DAS28, which is the core parameter for inflammatory activity in RA, can be used for clinical decision-making without adjustment for CRP gene variants.

=== Viral infections ===
Increased blood CRP levels were higher in people with avian flu H7N9 compared to those with H1N1 (more common) influenza, with a review reporting that severe H1N1 influenza had elevated CRP. In 2020, people infected with COVID-19 in Wuhan, China, had elevated CRP.

== Additional images ==
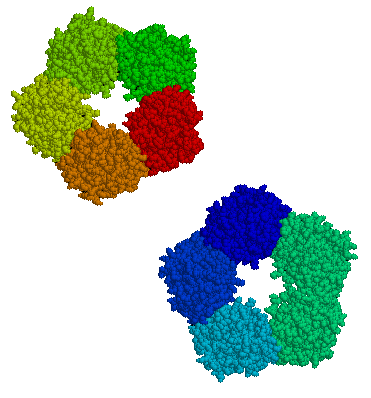
C-reactive protein

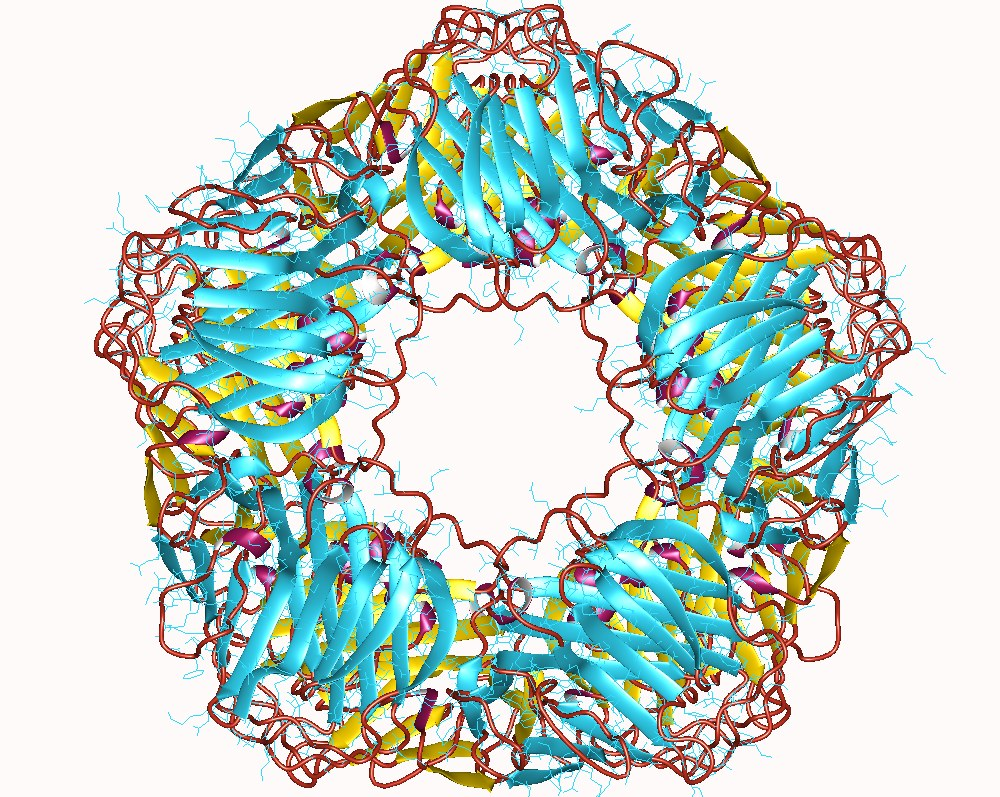
C-reactive protein
