= Pentraxins =

Protein family

Pentaxin family
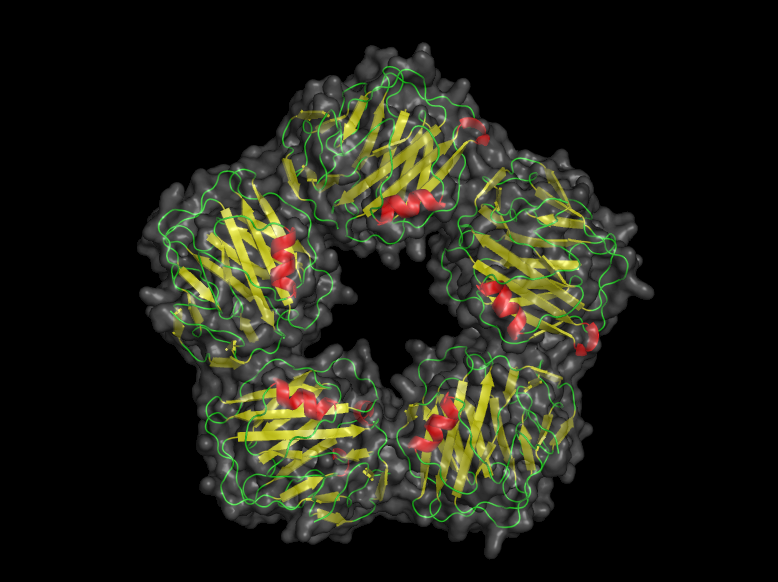
- CRP drawn from PDB: 1B09

Identifiers
- Symbol: Pentaxin
- Pfam: PF00354
- InterPro: IPR001759
- PROSITE: PDOC00261
- SCOP2: 1sac / SCOPe / SUPFAM
- CDD: cd00152
Available protein structures:
- PDB: 1limD:32-237 2a3wF:26-219 2a3xH:26-219 1lgnC:26-219 2a3yD:26-219 1gykA:26-219 1sacC:26-219 1hasB:29-222 1crvE:25-220 1lj7D:25-220 1b09C:25-220 1gnhA:25-220 IPR001759 PF00354 (ECOD; PDBsum)
- AlphaFold: IPR001759; PF00354

Pentraxins (PTX), also known as pentaxins, are an evolutionary conserved family of proteins characterised by containing a pentraxin protein domain. Proteins of the pentraxin family are involved in acute immunological responses. They are a class of pattern recognition receptors (PRRs). They are a superfamily of multifunctional conserved proteins, some of which are components of the humoral arm of innate immunity and behave as functional ancestors of antibodies (Abs). They are known as classical acute phase proteins (APP), known for over a century.

== Structure ==
Pentraxins are characterised by calcium dependent ligand binding and a distinctive flattened β-jellyroll structure similar to that of the legume lectins. The name "pentraxin" is derived from the Greek word for five (πέντε, pente) and axle (axis) relating to the radial symmetry of five monomers forming a ring approximately 95Å across and 35Å deep observed in the first members of this family to be identified. The "short" pentraxins include Serum Amyloid P component (SAP) and C reactive protein (CRP). The "long" pentraxins include PTX3 (a cytokine modulated molecule) and several neuronal pentraxins.

== Family members ==
Three of the principal members of the pentraxin family are serum proteins: namely, CRP, SAP, and hamster female protein (FP). PTX3 (or TSG-14) protein is a cytokine-induced protein that is homologous to CRPs and SAPs.

=== C-reactive protein ===
C-reactive protein is expressed during the acute phase response to tissue injury or inflammation in mammals. The protein resembles antibody and performs several functions associated with host defence: it promotes agglutination, bacterial capsular swelling and phagocytosis, and activates the classical complement pathway through its calcium-dependent binding to phosphocholine. CRPs have also been sequenced in an invertebrate, Limulus polyphemus (Atlantic horseshoe crab), where they are a normal constituent of the hemolymph.

=== Pentraxin 3 ===
Pentraxin 3 (PTX3) is an acute phase protein whose levels rise during severe infections in humans. In case of central nervous system infections PTX3 helps distinguishes between bacterial and aseptic meningoencephalitis. It is significantly higher in bacterial meningoencephalitis.

=== Serum amyloid P component ===
Serum amyloid P component is a vertebrate protein that is identical to tissue forms of amyloid P component. It is found in all types of amyloid deposits, in glomerular basement membrane and in elastic fibres in blood vessels. SAP binds to various lipoprotein ligands in a calcium-dependent manner, and it has been suggested that, in mammals, this may have important implications in atherosclerosis and amyloidosis.

=== Hamster female protein ===
Hamster female protein is a SAP homologue found in Mesocricetus auratus (the Golden hamster). The concentration of this plasma protein is altered by sex steroids and stimuli that elicit an acute phase response.

=== Nervous system ===
Pentraxin proteins expressed in the nervous system are neural pentraxin I (NPTXI) and II (NPTXII). NPTXI and NPTXII are homologous and can exist within one species. It is suggested that both proteins mediate the uptake of synaptic macromolecules and play a role in synaptic plasticity. Apexin, a sperm acrosomal protein, is a homologue of NPTXII found in Cavia porcellus (Guinea pig).

=== Human ===
Human genes encoding proteins that contain this domain include:

- APCS
- CRP
- GPR144
- NPTX1; NPTX2; NPTXR
- PTX3
- SVEP1
