= Nephelometry (medicine) =

Nephelometry is a technique used in immunology to determine the levels of several proteins in serum and cerebrospinal fluid (CSF). For example, the total levels of antibody isotypes or classes: Immunoglobulin M, Immunoglobulin G, and Immunoglobulin A. It is important in quantification of free light chains in diseases such as multiple myeloma. Quantification is important for disease classification and for disease monitoring once a patient has been treated (increased skewing of the ratio between kappa and lambda light chains after a patient has been treated is an indication of disease recurrence).

It is performed by measuring the scattered light at an angle from the sample being measured. In diagnostic nephelometry, the ascending branch of the Heidelberger-Kendall curve is extended by optimizing the course of the reaction so that most plasma proteins’ (from human blood) measurement signals fall at the left side of the Heidelberger-Kendall curve, even at very high concentrations.

This technique is widely used in clinical laboratories because it is relatively easily automated. It is based on the principle that a dilute suspension of small particles will scatter light (usually a laser) passed through it rather than simply absorbing it. The amount of scatter is determined by collecting the light at an angle (usually at 30 and 90 degrees).

Antibody and the antigen are mixed in concentrations such that only small aggregates are formed that do not quickly settle to the bottom. The amount of light scatter is measured and compared to the amount of scatter from known mixtures. The amount of the unknown is determined from a standard curve.

Nephelometry can be used to detect either antigen or antibody, but it is usually run with antibody as the reagent and the patient antigen as the unknown. In the Immunology Medical Lab, two types of tests can be run: "end point nephelometry" and "kinetic (rate) nephelometry".

End point nephelometry tests are run by allowing the antibody/antigen reaction to run through to completion (until all of the present reagent antibodies and the present patient sample antigens that can aggregate have done so and no more complexes can form). However, the large particles will fall out of the solution and cause a false scatter reading, thus kinetic nephelometry was devised.

In kinetic nephelometry, the rate of scatter is measured right after the reagent is added. As long as the reagent is constant the rate of change can be seen as directly related to the amount of antigen present.

== Other applications ==
Aside from the medical applications, nephelometry can be used to measure water clarity, to measure the growth of microorganisms and to test drug solubility.

== See also ==
- Nephelometer
- Precipitin reaction
- Turbidimetry
