= Decoy receptors =

A decoy receptor is a receptor that is able to recognize and bind specific ligands efficiently, but is not able to support its intended function. This ligand can be a growth factors or cytokines, in which case the receptor is not structurally able to signal or activate the intended receptor complex. It can also be a pathogen, preventing normal cell attachment or cell entry. In either case it acts as an inhibitor, binding a ligand and keeping it from binding to its regular receptor. Decoy receptors participate in common methods of signal inhibition and are also abundant in malignant tissues, making up a significant topic in cancer research.

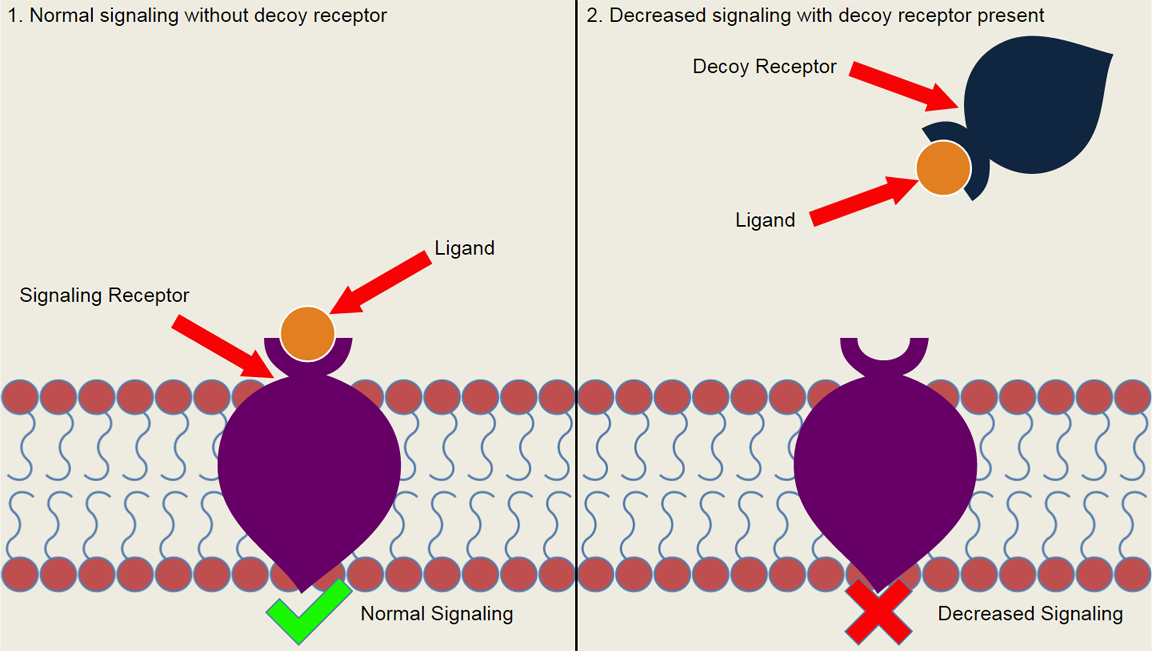
Decoy receptors/ bind to ligands and inhibit signaling through actual receptors.

== Examples ==
=== Interleukin 1 receptor type II ===
IL1R2 was one of the first identified decoy receptors. It binds IL1A and IL1B and inhibits their binding to IL1R1, deterring the inflammatory response which is generally promoted by the binding of type 1 interleukins to interleukin receptor 1 type I.

=== Decoy receptor 3 (DcR3) ===
Also known as TNFRSF6, the DcR3 receptor is found primarily in human malignant tissues. It acts as a decoy receptor for TNF cytokine members: FasL, LIGHT, and TL1A, inhibiting the ability of the cytokines to signal cell death or apoptosis.

=== VEGFR-1 ===
VEGFR-1 is a kinase-defective receptor tyrosine kinase that negatively modulates angiogenesis by acting as a decoy receptor. The decoy characteristic of VEGFR-1 is required for normal development and angiogenesis. VEGFR-1 inhibits the activity of VEGFR-2 by sequestering VEGF, thus preventing VEGFR-2 from binding to VEGF.

== Applications ==
=== Engineered Axl "decoy receptor" ===
Axl receptor tyrosine kinase has been associated with numerous diseases, most notably metastatic cancer. Axl has been shown to drive metastasis, confer therapeutic resistance and promote disease progression. Axl binds to its ligand, Gas6, and becomes activated. Decoy receptors are being designed to bind to Gas6 and prevent Axl activation.

=== ACE-031 ===
ACE-031 is an engineered decoy receptor and myostatin inhibitor used in attempts to treat children with Duchenne muscular dystrophy (DMD). The ACE-031 receptor circulates outside the muscle-fiber membrane. Because this receptor binds to myostatin, it lowers the amount of myostatin that can bind to the native receptor in the membrane (ActRIIB), preventing myostatin from delivering the muscle growth-limiting signal.
