= Interleukin 1 receptor, type I =

Type of interleukin receptor

IL1R1
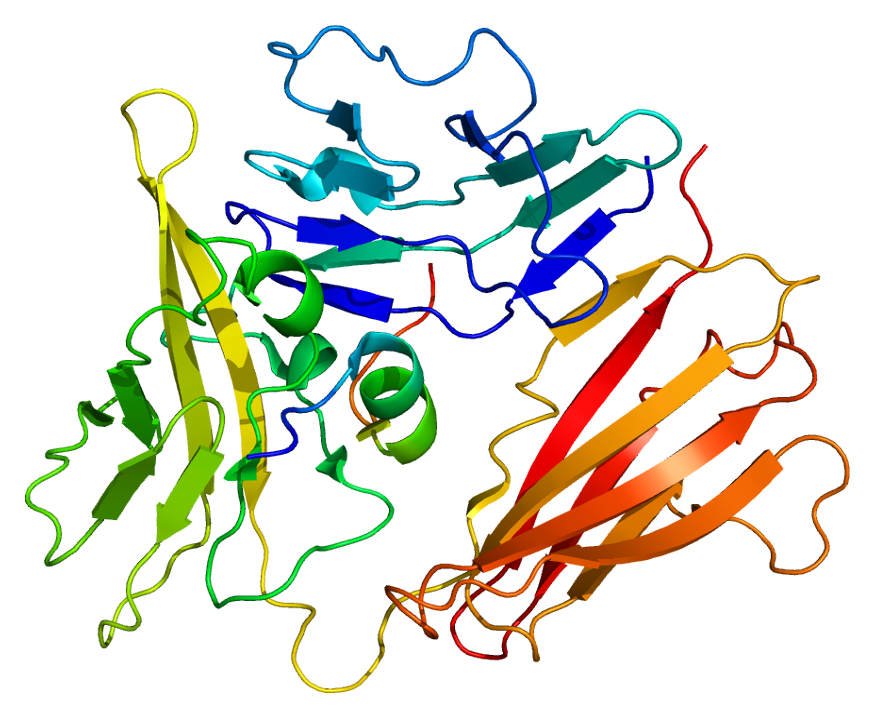

Identifiers
- Aliases: IL1R1, CD121A, D2S1473, IL-1R-alpha, IL1R, IL1RA, P80, Interleukin 1 receptor, type I, interleukin 1 receptor type 1
- External IDs: OMIM: 147810; MGI: 96545; GeneCards: IL1R1
Available structures
PDB	Ortholog search: PDBe RCSB
PDB	List of PDB id codes 1G0Y, 1IRA, 1ITB, 4DEP, 4GAF
Enzyme activity
EC #	BRENDA	ExPASy	KEGG	MetaCyc
3.2.2.6	↗	↗	↗	↗

Gene location (Human)
Chr.	Chromosome 2 (human)
Band	2q11.2-q12.1	Start	102,064,544 bp
Band	2q11.2-q12.1	End	102,179,874 bp

Gene location (Mouse)
Chr.	Chromosome 1 (mouse)
Band	1 B|1 18.81 cM	Start	40,225,080 bp
Band	1 B|1 18.81 cM	End	40,317,257 bp
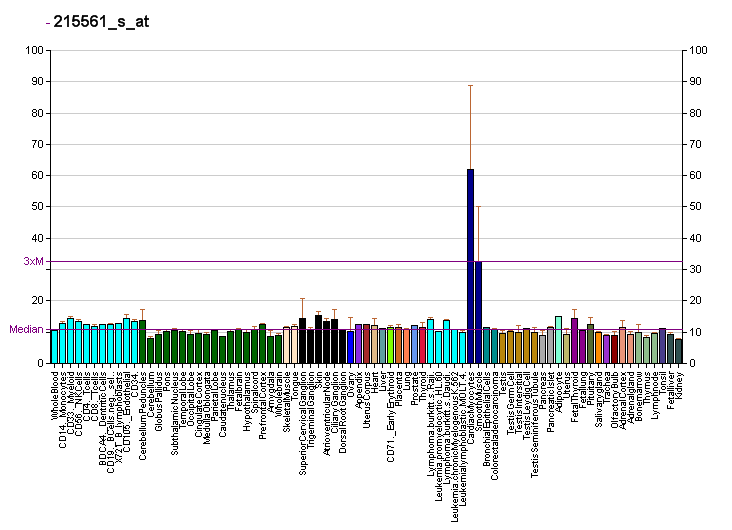
RNA expression pattern
Bgee	Human / Mouse (ortholog); Top expressed in: palpebral conjunctiva; tibia; pericardium; corpus epididymis; decidua; caput epididymis; urethra; vena cava; visceral pleura; parietal pleura / Top expressed in: islet of Langerhans; seminal vesicula; umbilical cord; skin of external ear; medullary collecting duct; aortic valve; primary oocyte; ciliary body; tunica media of zone of aorta; cumulus cell; More reference expression data
BioGPS	More reference expression data
Gene ontology
Molecular function	interleukin-1, type I, activating receptor activity; signal transducer activity; platelet-derived growth factor receptor binding; protease binding; protein binding; transmembrane signaling receptor activity; interleukin-1 receptor activity; interleukin-1 binding
Cellular component	integral component of membrane; membrane; plasma membrane; integral component of plasma membrane; extracellular region; cell surface; external side of plasma membrane
Biological process	cell surface receptor signaling pathway; immune response; regulation of inflammatory response; signal transduction; positive regulation of interleukin-1-mediated signaling pathway; positive regulation of neutrophil extravasation; response to interleukin-1; cytokine-mediated signaling pathway; interleukin-1-mediated signaling pathway; positive regulation of interferon-gamma production; positive regulation of T-helper 1 cell cytokine production; inflammatory response
Sources:Amigo / QuickGO
Orthologs
Databases	NCBI: entry; OMA: entry
Species	Human	Mouse
Entrez	3554	16177
Ensembl	ENSG00000115594	ENSMUSG00000026072
UniProt	P14778	P13504
RefSeq (mRNA)	NM_000877; NM_001288706; NM_001320978; NM_001320980; NM_001320981 NM_001320982; NM_001320983; NM_001320984; NM_001320985; NM_001320986	NM_001123382; NM_008362
RefSeq (protein)	NP_000868; NP_001275635; NP_001307907; NP_001307909; NP_001307910 NP_001307911; NP_001307912; NP_001307913; NP_001307914; NP_001307915	NP_001116854; NP_032388
Location (UCSC)	Chr 2: 102.06 – 102.18 Mb	Chr 1: 40.23 – 40.32 Mb
PubMed search
- Wikidata
View/Edit Human	View/Edit Mouse

Interleukin 1 receptor, type I (IL1R1) also known as CD121a (Cluster of Differentiation 121a), is an interleukin receptor. IL1R1 also denotes its human gene.

The protein encoded by this gene is a cytokine receptor that belongs to the interleukin-1 receptor family. This protein is a receptor for interleukin 1 alpha (IL1A), interleukin 1 beta (IL1B), and interleukin 1 receptor antagonist (IL1RA). It is an important mediator involved in many cytokine induced immune and inflammatory responses. This gene along with interleukin 1 receptor, type II (IL1R2), interleukin 1 receptor-like 2 (IL1RL2), and interleukin 1 receptor-like 1 (IL1RL1) form a cytokine receptor gene cluster in a region mapped to chromosome 2q12.

== Interactions ==
Interleukin 1 receptor, type I has been shown to interact with PIK3R1, Myd88 and IL1RAP.

== See also ==
- Cluster of differentiation
- Interleukin 1 receptor, type II
