= Taipoxin =

Neurotoxic phospholipase

Taipoxin subunit α

Identifiers
- Organism: Oxyuranus scutellatus
- Symbol: ?
- Orthologs: OMA: entry
- UniProt: P00614
Search for
- Structures: Swiss-model
- Domains: InterPro

Taipoxin subunit β1

Identifiers
- Organism: Oxyuranus scutellatus
- Symbol: ?
- Orthologs: OMA: entry
- PDB: 3VC0
- UniProt: P00615
Search for
- Structures: Swiss-model
- Domains: InterPro

Taipoxin subunit β2

Identifiers
- Organism: Oxyuranus scutellatus
- Symbol: ?
- Orthologs: OMA: entry
- PDB: 3vbz
- UniProt: P0CG57
Search for
- Structures: Swiss-model
- Domains: InterPro

Taipoxin subunit γ

Identifiers
- Organism: Oxyuranus scutellatus
- Symbol: ?
- Orthologs: OMA: entry
- UniProt: P00616
Search for
- Structures: Swiss-model
- Domains: InterPro

Taipoxin is a potent myo- and neurotoxin that was isolated from the venom of the coastal taipan (Oxyuranus scutellatus), also known as the common taipan. Taipoxin like many other pre-synaptic neurotoxins are phospholipase A_{2} (PLA_{2}) toxins, which inhibit/complete block the release of the motor transmitter acetylcholine and lead to death by paralysis of the respiratory muscles (asphyxia). It is the most lethal neurotoxin isolated from any snake venom to date.

The molecular mass of the heterotrimer is about 46,000 Dalton; comprising 1:1:1 α, β and γ monomers. Median lethal dose (LD_{50}) for mice is around 1–2 μg/kg (subcutaneous injection).

== History ==
Taipoxin and other PLA_{2} toxins have evolved from the digestive PLA_{2} enzymes. The venom still functions with the almost identical multi-disulphide-bridged protein PLA_{2} scaffold, which causes the hydrolytic mechanism of the enzyme. However it is thought that under strict evolution selection pressures of prey immobilisation and therefore extended feeding lead to the PLA_{2} enzyme losing its so called pancreatic loop and mutations for the toxin binding with pre-synaptic membranes of motor neuron end plates.

== Structure ==
Taipoxin is a ternary complex consisting of three subunits of α, β and γ monomers in a 1:1:1 ratio, also called the A, B and C homologous subunits. These subunits are equally distributed across the structure, and together the three-dimensional structures of these three monomers form a shared core of three α-helices, a Ca^{2+} binding site and a hydrophobic channel to which the fatty acyl chains binds.

The α and β complex consist of 120 amino acid residues which are cross linked by 7 disulfide bridges. The alpha subunit is very basic (pH(I)>10) and the only one that shows neurotoxicity. The β complex is neutral and can be separated into two isoforms. β1 and β2 are interchangeable but differ slightly in amino acid composition. The γ complex contains 135 amino acid residues which are cross linked by 8 disulfide bridges. It is very acidic due to 4 sialic acid residues, which might be important for complex formation. The gamma subunit also seems to function as a protector of the alpha complex, preventing fast renal clearance or proteolytic degradation. It also boosts the specificity on the target and could be involved in the binding of the alpha unit. The whole complex is slightly acidic with a pH(I) of 5, but under a lower pH and/or high ionic strength the subunits dissociate.

Just as the PLA_{2} enzyme the PLA_{2} toxin is Ca^{2+} dependent for hydrolysing fatty acyl ester bonds at the sn-2 position of glycerol-phospholipids. Depending on disulphide bridge positions and lengths of C-termini these PLA_{2} enzymes/PLA_{2} toxins are categorized into three classes. These classes are also an indication of the toxicity of PLA_{2}/PLA_{2}, as PLA_{2}s from pancreatic secretions, bee venom or the weak elapid venoms are grouped into class I, whereas PLA_{2}s from the more potent viperid venoms which causes inflammatory exudate's are grouped into class II. However most snake venoms are capable of more than one toxic activity, such as cytotoxicity, myotoxicity, neuro-toxicity, anticoagulant activity and hypotensive effects.

== Isolation process ==
Taipoxin can be purified from the venom of the coastal taipan by gel filtration chromatography. In addition to taipoxin, the venom consists of many different components, responsible for the complex symptoms.

== Mechanism of action ==
In the beginning taipoxin was thought to be only neurotoxic. Studies showed an increase in acetylcholine release, indicating a presynaptic activity. Further experiments showed that Taipoxin inhibited the responses to electrical stimuli greater than the reaction to additionally administered acetylcholine. This led to the conclusion that taipoxin has pre- and postsynaptic effects. Additional to the increased acetylcholine release it inhibits the vesicular recycling. More recent studies showed that the toxin has a myotoxic effect as well. The injection of taipoxin into the hind limbs of rats leads to oedema formation and muscle degeneration. The study also supports the findings by Fohlman, that the α subunit yields the PLA_{2} potency, which is similar to the potency of notexin. Even so, the full potential of the raw toxin is only reached by the combination of the α and γ subunits.

A similar experiment has been done refocusing on the neural compounds. 24 hours after the injection the innervation was compromised to the extent of being unable to identify intact axons. This showed that taipoxin like toxins lead to the depletion of transmitters from the nerve terminals and lead to the degeneration of nerve terminal and intramuscular axons. In chromaffin cells taipoxin showed the ability to enter the cells via Ca^{2+} independent mechanisms. There it enhanced catecholamine release in depolarizing cells by disassembling F-actin in the cytoskeletal barrier. This could lead to a vesicle redistribution promoting immediate access into the subplasmalemmal area.

More research studies have found potential binding partners of taipoxin, which would give more insight into how taipoxin is transported to the nerve terminals and intramuscular axons.

== Toxicity ==
The toxicity of Taipoxin or other PLA_{2} toxins are often measured with their ability to cut short chain phospholipids or phospholipids-analogues. For taipoxin PLA_{2} activity was set on 0.4 mmol/min/mg, and the binding constant (K) of taipoxin would be equal to: K_{Taipoxin} = K_{A} + K_{B} + K_{C} as it consist out of 3 enzymatic domains/subunits. However no correlation was made between PLA_{2} activity and toxicity, as the pharmacokinetics and the membrane binding properties are more important. A more specific membrane binding would lead to accumulation of taipoxin in the plasma membranes of motor-neurons.

== Treatment ==
The treatment of choice is an antivenom produced by CSL Ltd in 1956 in Australia on the basis of immunised horse plasma. After being bitten the majority of patients will develop systemic envenoming of which clinical evidence is usually present within two hours. This effect can be delayed by applying first aid measures, like immobilization. Additional to neurotoxins taipan venom contains anticoagulants whose effect is also inhibited by the antivenom.

== Similar toxins ==
Similar to taipoxin are toxins with different subunits of the PLA domains:

Notexin is a monomer from Notechis scutatus venom, β-bungarotoxin is a heterodimer from Chinese banded krait (Bungarus multicinctus) venom, and textilotoxin is a pentamer from eastern Pseudonaja textilis venom.
