= CPHPC =

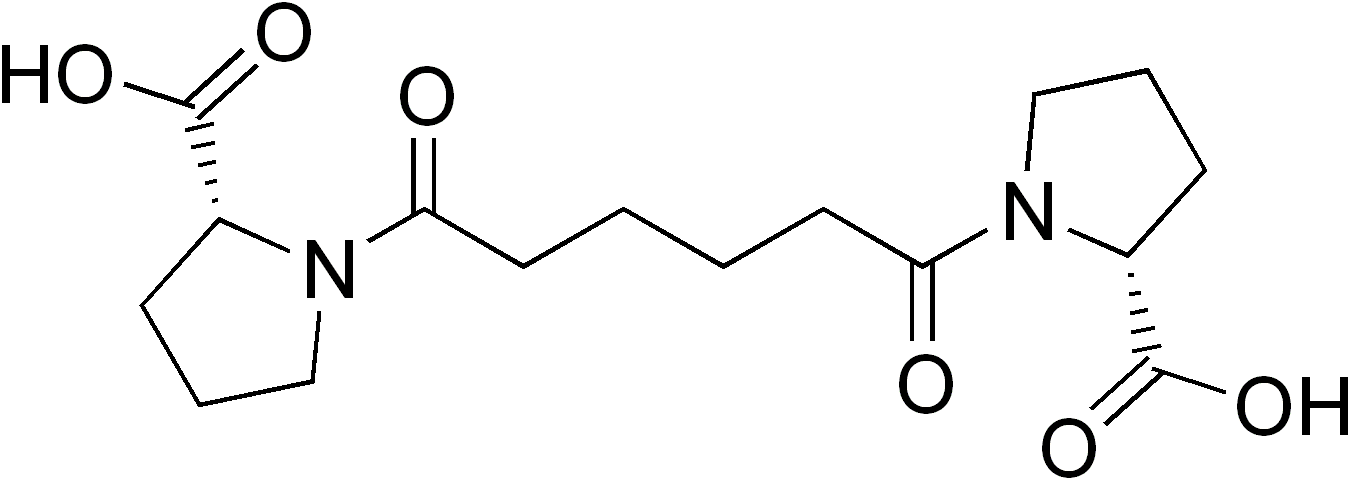

Names
- Preferred IUPAC name (2R,2′R)-1,1′-Hexanedioyldi(pyrrolidine-2-carboxylic acid)
- Other names Ro 63-8695

Identifiers
CAS Number	224624-80-0
3D model (JSmol)	Interactive image
ChEMBL	ChEMBL25263
ChemSpider	111662
ECHA InfoCard	100.262.818
IUPHAR/BPS	8256
PubChem CID	125516
UNII	WO97N24A47
CompTox Dashboard (EPA)	DTXSID00176996
- InChI: InChI=1S/C16H24N2O6/c19-13(17-9-3-5-11(17)15(21)22)7-1-2-8-14(20)18-10-4-6-12(18)16(23)24/h11-12H,1-10H2,(H,21,22)(H,23,24)/t11-,12-/m1/s1 Key: HZLAWYIBLZNRFZ-VXGBXAGGSA-N; InChI=1/C16H24N2O6/c19-13(17-9-3-5-11(17)15(21)22)7-1-2-8-14(20)18-10-4-6-12(18)16(23)24/h11-12H,1-10H2,(H,21,22)(H,23,24)/t11-,12-/m1/s1 Key: HZLAWYIBLZNRFZ-VXGBXAGGBC
- SMILES: O=C(O)[C@@H]2N(C(=O)CCCCC(=O)N1[C@@H](C(=O)O)CCC1)CCC2

Properties
Chemical formula	C_{16}H_{24}N_{2}O_{6}
Molar mass	340.37 g/mol
- Except where otherwise noted, data are given for materials in their standard state (at 25 °C [77 °F], 100 kPa). verify (what is ?) Infobox references

CPHPC ((R)-1-{6-[(R)-2-carboxypyrrolidin-1-yl]-6-oxohexanoyl}pyrrolidine-2-carboxylic acid) is a proline-derived small molecule able to strip amyloid P (AP) from deposits by reducing levels of circulating serum amyloid P (SAP). The SAP-amyloid association has also been identified as a possible drug target for anti-amyloid therapy, with the recent development and first stage clinical trials of CPHPC for amyloidosis.

CPHPC has also been patented for possible treatment of Alzheimer's disease.

== Mechanism ==
The symmetrical nature of CPHPC allows it to bind to two molecules of AP (the SAP subunits). This allows five molecules of CPHPC to bind two SAP pentamers together by the B/binding face blocking the binding on to existing amyloid deposits.
