= Notexin =

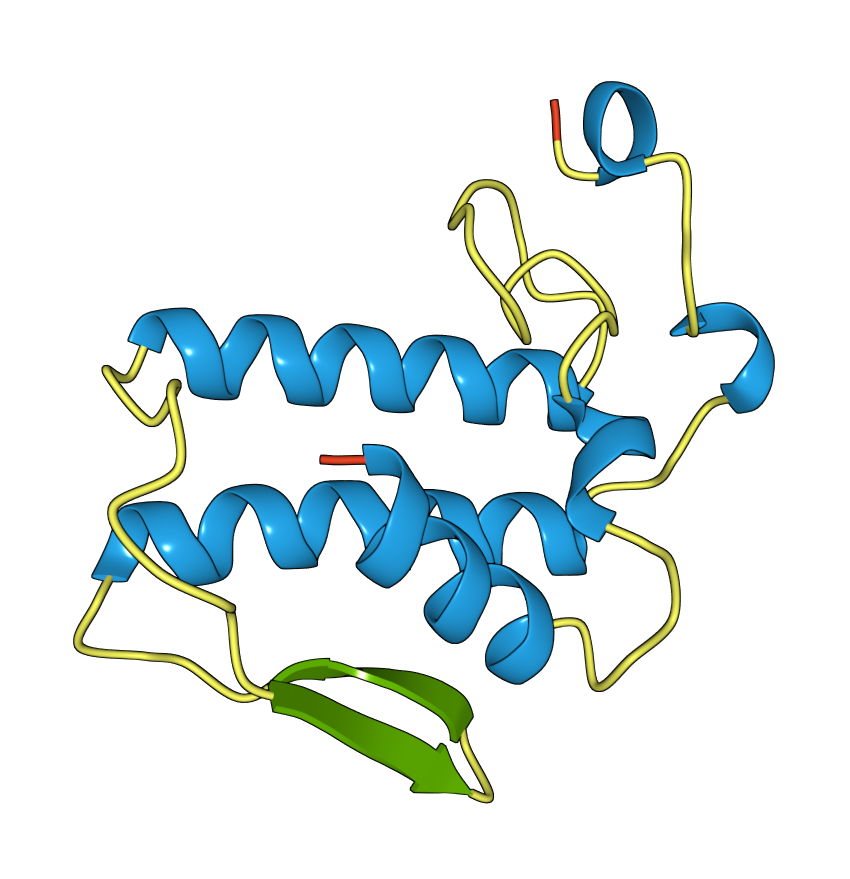
- Schematic diagram of the three-dimensional structure of notexin(PDB: 1AE7).

Identifiers
- Organism: Notechis scutatus
- Symbol: N/A
- CAS number: 37223-96-4
- Orthologs: OMA: entry
- PDB: 1AE7
- UniProt: P00608
Search for
- Structures: Swiss-model
- Domains: InterPro

Notexin is a toxin produced by the tiger snake (Notechis scutatus). It is a myotoxic and presynaptic, neurotoxic phospholipase A2 (PLA_{2}s). These are enzymes that hydrolyze the bond between a fatty acid tail and glycerol in fatty acids on the 2-position.

== History ==
The name notexin comes from the fact that this toxin was first found to be the major component in the venom of the tiger snake. The name notexin is thus a combination of the genus name Notechis and the word toxin. The tiger snake was first described by Wilhelm Peters in 1861. The toxin was first purified more than a hundred years later in 1972 by Karlsson et al. This prompted more research into notexin.

== Structure ==
Notexin consists of a single molecule. This molecule is a single-peptide chain of 119 amino acid residues that are cross-linked with 7 disulfide-bridges.

X-ray diffraction has been used to determine the crystal structure of notexin and led to the conclusion that notexin belongs to either the P3121 or P3221 space group with lattice parameters a = b = 74.6 Å, c = 49.0 Å with a β of 120⁰. This data was found with a resolution of 2.0 Å and had an R-factor of 16.5%. For protein data, this R-factor is usually 20%, indicating that the crystal structure of notexin is relatively well defined.

The supramolecular structure of notexin is very similar to that of other PLA_{2}s. Both notexin and many PLA_{2}s contain four characteristic main helices (the αA, αB, αC and αE helices) and a short carboxyl end helix in their secondary structure. Also the active site seems to be similar enough to that of other PLA_{2}s in order to use their model building studies when discussing enzymatic properties. Notexin does deviate significantly from other PLA_{2}s due to different main chain lengths and its conformation in the 69th amino acid residue.

The active site of notexin contains His-48. This residue is in close contact with the carboxylate oxygens of an Asp-99 residue, which is also present in notexin. For most PLA_{2}s the wall of the active site is covered with hydrophobic residues. When a lone pair on the oxygen of water attacks the ester, the His-48 residue facilitates a proton transfer and the substrates's carbonyl oxygen is possibly fixated and stabilized by the positively charged NH-groups on the PLA_{2}s.

== Mechanism of action ==
Notexin is generally lethal if it enters the bloodstream in rats. This lethal effect is the result of a presynaptic blockade of transmission across neuromuscular junctions of the breathing muscles, causing asphyxiation. It has also been shown to have myotoxic effects upon intravenous injection. Myotoxic effects generally entail muscle necrosis.

It was proposed (Dixon et al., 1996) that this myotoxicity of notexin is the result of notexin binding to the sarcolemma, causing hypercontraction and thereby muscle necrosis as a result of the membrane between places of hypercontraction rupturing. The presynaptic activity is, however, much more potent, at least in mice.

Notexin causes an indirect reduction or complete end of the release of acetylcholine in the affected nerve terminals. This acetylcholine normally causes an action potential and thereby muscle contraction. It was found that this reduction of acetylcholine release was caused by an impaired recycling of synaptic vesicles as a reduction in the content of synaptic vesicles and abnormally large vesicles were observed in the affected tissues. This was followed by shrinking of the nerve terminals and the amount of vesicles in these terminals decreasing.

The exact way of interaction with the cell is unknown, but it is suggested that notexin, like other PLA_{2}s, interacts with high-affinity specific protein receptors or low-affinity lipid domains of muscle cells and motor neurons. Interaction of notexin with the plasma membrane results in the hydrolysis of the phospholipids in the cell membrane. A study showed that without the PLA_{2} activity, notexin also has membrane damaging effects, suggesting that notexin has multiple mechanisms to damage the cell membrane.

Cell membranes become permeable for ions and cause an influx of Ca^{2+} from the extracellular medium. In muscle cells the influx of Ca^{2+} causes hypercontraction of myofilaments, which can cause mechanical damage to the plasma membrane. The mitochondria will take up Ca^{2+}, eventually leading to a reduced mitochondrial functionality. The high Ca^{2+} concentration in the cytosol activates Ca^{2+}-dependent proteinases, calpains, and the endogenous Ca^{2+}-dependent phospholipase A_{2}. The calpains degrade the cytoskeletal components of the cell and Ca^{2+}-dependent phospholipase A_{2} hydrolyses the cell membrane, which leads to further cell degradation and bigger influx of Ca^{2+}. At a certain point the damage is irreversible and necrosis of the cell occurs.

In neurons the influx of calcium causes the release of the ready-to-release synaptic vesicles and the reserve pool of synaptic vesicles. Research showed that neurons, after treatment with notexin, had strongly reduced numbers of synaptic vesicles. These results seem to indicate that notexin inhibits the endocytosis of new synaptic vesicles, besides the exocytosis as a result of the Ca2+ influx. Like in muscle cells, the Ca2+ influx in neurons also leads to reduced mitochondrial functionality and the activation of calpains and endogenous Ca^{2+}-dependent PLA_{2}s. This leads to the same structural damage as in muscle cells.

Experimental research also showed that notexin had nephrotoxic effects on mice. A study showed that depending on the dose, there was renal tubular and glomerular damage within 24 hours.

== Immune response ==
Not much about the metabolism of notexin is known. However, studies have shown that the toxin can be made ineffective by specific antibodies. In a certain study, mice become resistant to notexin, similar isoforms of the toxin and other venoms from the same origin. This was done by exposing the mice to the non-detoxified notexin. It was found that the C-terminal part of the notexin peptide chain is the binding site for these antibodies and thus it is known that this is the site for an antigenic domain. Another study showed that at least some of the antigens that are able to block the effects of notexin do this by cross-neutralizations. Certain antibodies have also been shown to have different affinities for different notexin isoforms. These different isoforms occur in snakes that have different geographical locations. It is thus not the case that notexin antibodies necessarily bind to all notexin isoforms with the same affinity.

== Symptoms ==
Notexin causes pain at the site of the bite followed by excessive salivation, weakness, drowsiness, difficulty breathing, decreased blood pressure and paralysis of lips, larynx, tongue and facial muscles. Possibly, blurring of vision, ptosis, headaches and convulsions may also occur.

== Toxicity ==
There has been no research on the reaction of notexin in humans, however it is known that upon injection with the toxin, muscle damage and myoglobinuria will follow. Data has shown that the tiger snake is one of the major causes of snake bites in Australia leading to being the second most common cause of death from snakebites.

Several results on the toxic effects of notexin in rodents have been reported. When injecting 1 to 2 μg of pure toxin into a rat soleus muscle, it will destroy all of the muscle fibers. In mice the LD_{50} is 0.214 mg/kg when applied subcutaneously and 0.04 mg/kg when applied intravenously. There have also been researches into functional and morphological properties of regrowing mouse extensor digitorum longus (EDL) muscles after a notexin injection. Three days after injection there was complete fiber breakdown and loss of functional capacity. After ten days the muscles were made up entirely of regrowing fibers.

== Treatment ==
There is no notexin antivenom available on the market. There are two general tiger snake antivenoms available that potentially could work. There are no studies found on the effectiveness of the tiger snake antivenoms on notexin.
