= Interleukin 1 receptor, type II =

Protein-coding gene in the species Homo sapiens

IL1R2

Identifiers
- Aliases: IL1R2, CD121b, CDw121b, IL-1R-2, IL-1RT-2, IL-1RT2, IL1R2c, IL1RB, Interleukin 1 receptor, type II, interleukin 1 receptor type 2
- External IDs: OMIM: 147811; MGI: 96546; GeneCards: IL1R2
Available structures
PDB	Ortholog search: PDBe RCSB
PDB	List of PDB id codes 3O4O

Gene location (Human)
Chr.	Chromosome 2 (human)
Band	2q11.2	Start	101,991,960 bp
Band	2q11.2	End	102,028,544 bp

Gene location (Mouse)
Chr.	Chromosome 1 (mouse)
Band	1 B|1 18.65 cM	Start	40,113,239 bp
Band	1 B|1 18.65 cM	End	40,164,391 bp
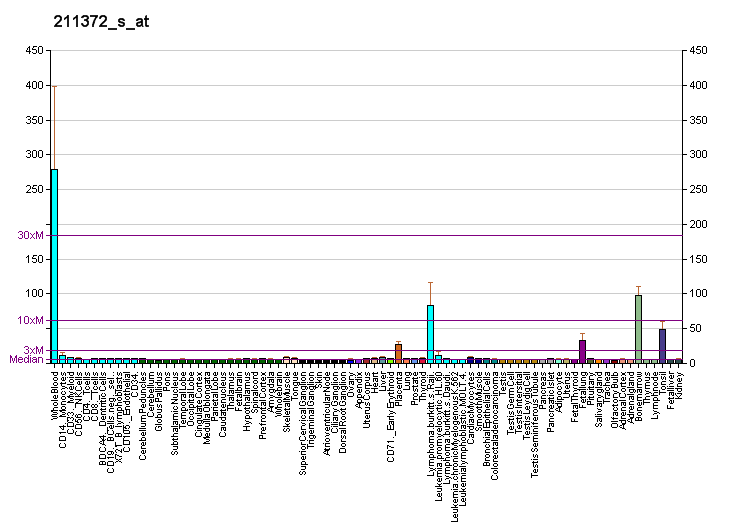

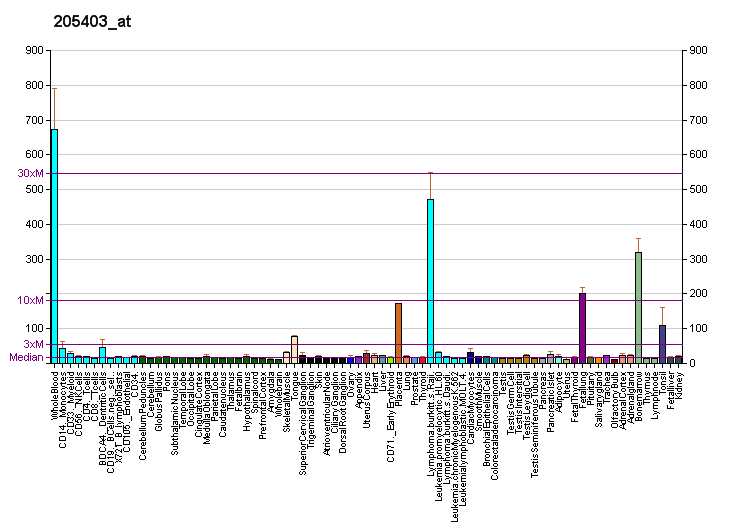
RNA expression pattern
Bgee	Human / Mouse (ortholog); Top expressed in: corpus epididymis; mucosa of sigmoid colon; decidua; mucosa of pharynx; blood; right lung; epithelium of nasopharynx; human penis; oral cavity; vulva / Top expressed in: gastrula; granulocyte; skin of external ear; decidua; esophagus; lip; skin of back; subcutaneous adipose tissue; primary oocyte; embryo; More reference expression data
BioGPS	More reference expression data
Gene ontology
Molecular function	interleukin-1, type II, blocking receptor activity; protein binding; interleukin-1 receptor activity; interleukin-1 binding
Cellular component	integral component of membrane; extracellular region; plasma membrane; membrane; cytoplasm
Biological process	immune response; negative regulation of protein processing; negative regulation of cytokine production involved in inflammatory response; negative regulation of interleukin-1-mediated signaling pathway; cytokine-mediated signaling pathway; interleukin-1-mediated signaling pathway
Sources:Amigo / QuickGO
Orthologs
Databases	NCBI: entry; OMA: entry
Species	Human	Mouse
Entrez	7850	16178
Ensembl	ENSG00000115590	ENSMUSG00000026073
UniProt	P27930	P27931
RefSeq (mRNA)	NM_001261419; NM_004633; NM_173343	NM_010555; NM_001360800; NM_001360801
RefSeq (protein)	NP_001248348; NP_004624	NP_034685; NP_001347729; NP_001347730
Location (UCSC)	Chr 2: 101.99 – 102.03 Mb	Chr 1: 40.11 – 40.16 Mb
PubMed search
- Wikidata
View/Edit Human	View/Edit Mouse

Interleukin 1 receptor, type II (IL-1R2) also known as CD121b (Cluster of Differentiation 121b) is an interleukin receptor. IL1R2 also denotes its human gene.

== Function ==
The protein encoded by this gene is a decoy receptor for certain cytokines that belongs to the interleukin-1 receptor family. This protein binds interleukin-1α (IL1A), interleukin-1β (IL1B), and interleukin 1 receptor antagonist (IL1Ra), preventing them from binding to their regular receptors and thereby inhibiting the transduction of their signaling. IL-1R2 protein also interacts non-productively with the second component of the signaling IL-1 receptor, namely IL-1RAcP, and a complex of the IL-1R2 and IL-1RAcP extracellular domains with interleukin-1 beta has been solved by X-ray crystallography. Interleukin 4 (IL4) is reported to antagonize the activity of interleukin 1 by inducing the expression and release of this cytokine. This gene and three other genes form a cytokine receptor gene cluster on chromosome 2q12. Two alternatively spliced transcript variants encoding the same protein have been reported.

== See also ==
- Cluster of differentiation
- Interleukin 1 receptor, type I
