= Turbidimetry =

Analytical method

Turbidimetry (the name being derived from turbidity) is the process of measuring the loss of intensity of transmitted light due to the scattering effect of particles suspended in it. Light is passed through a filter creating a light of known wavelength which is then passed through a cuvette containing a solution. A photoelectric cell collects the light with a spectrophotometer or a photometer, which passes through the cuvette. A measurement is then given for the amount of absorbed light.

Turbidimetry can be used in biology to find the number of cells in a suspension. Turbidity-is an expression of optical look of a suspension caused by radiation to the scattered and absorbed wavelength. Scattering of light is elastic so both incident and scattered radiation have the same wavelength. A turbidimeter measures the amount of radiation that passes through a fluid in forward direction, analogous to absorption spectrophotometry. Standard for turbidimetry is prepared by dissolving 5g of hydrazinium (2+) sulfate(N2H4H2SO4) and 50g of hexamethylenetetramine in 1 liter of distilled water is defined as 4000 nephelometric Turbidity Unit (NTU) Application Determination of water, Clarity of pharma products and drinks, Immunoassay in lab. Turbidimetry offers little advantage than nephelometry in measurement of sensitivity in low level antigen an antibody immunoassay. Antigen excess and matrix effects are limitations encountered.

== Immunoturbidimetry ==
Immunoturbidimetry is an important tool in the broad diagnostic field of clinical chemistry. It is used to determine serum proteins not detectable with classical clinical chemistry methods. Immunoturbidimetry uses the classical antigen-antibody reaction. The antigen-antibody complexes aggregate to form particles that can be optically detected by a photometer.

== See also ==
- Colorimetry
- Turbidity
