= Cyclodeaminase domain =

FTCD_C
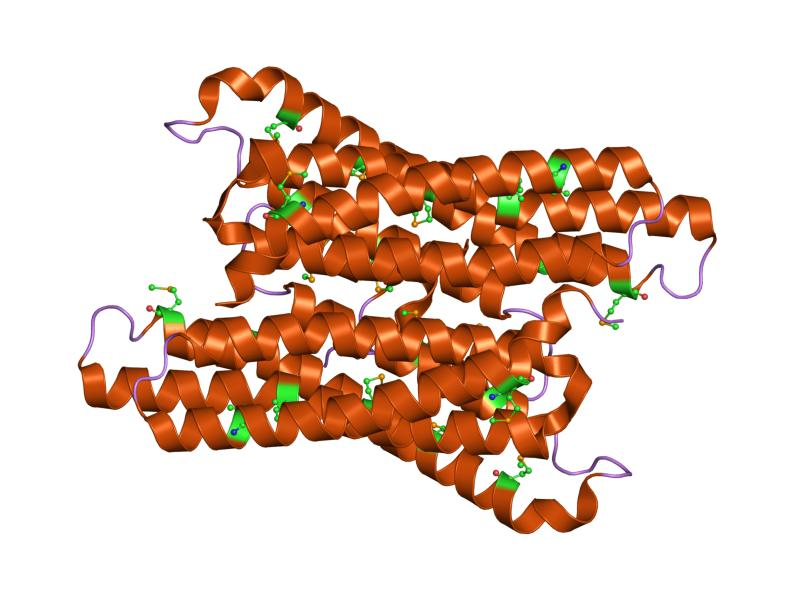
- crystal structure of formiminotetrahydrofolate cyclodeaminase (tm1560) from thermotoga maritima at 2.80 a resolution

Identifiers
- Symbol: FTCD_C
- Pfam: PF04961
- InterPro: IPR007044
- SCOP2: 1o5h / SCOPe / SUPFAM
Available protein structures:
- PDB: IPR007044 PF04961 (ECOD; PDBsum)
- AlphaFold: IPR007044; PF04961

In molecular biology, enzymes containing the cyclodeaminase domain function in channeling one-carbon units to the folate pool. In most cases, this domain acts as a formimidoyltetrahydrofolate cyclodeaminase, which catalyses the cyclisation of formimidoyltetrahydrofolate to methenyltetrahydrofolate as shown in reaction (1). In the methylotrophic bacterium Methylobacterium extorquens, however, it acts as a methenyltetrahydrofolate cyclohydrolase, which catalyses the interconversion of formyltetrahydrofolate and methylenetetrahydrofolate, as shown in reaction (2).

(1) 5-formimidoyltetrahydrofolate = 5,10-methenyltetrahydrofolate + NH(3)

(2) 10- formyltetrahydrofolate = 5,10-methenyltetrahydrofolate + H(2)O

In prokaryotes, this domain mostly occurs on its own, while in eukaryotes it is fused to a glutamate formiminotransferase domain (which catalyses the previous step in the pathway) to form the bifunctional enzyme formiminotransferase cyclodeaminase. The eukaryotic enzyme is a circular tetramer of homodimers, while the prokaryotic enzyme is a dimer.

The crystal structure of the cyclodeaminase enzyme from Thermaotogoa maritima has been studied. It is a homodimer, where each monomer is composed of six alpha helices arranged in an up and down helical bundle, forming a novel fold. The location of the active site is not known, but sequence alignments revealed two clusters of conserved residues located in a deep pocket within the dimmer interface. This pocket was large enough to accommodate the reaction product and it was postulated that this is the active site.
