= MTHFD2L =

Protein-coding gene in the species Homo sapiens

Identifiers
- Aliases: MTHFD2L, methylenetetrahydrofolate dehydrogenase (NADP+ dependent) 2-like, methylenetetrahydrofolate dehydrogenase (NADP+ dependent) 2 like
- External IDs: OMIM: 614047; MGI: 1915871; GeneCards: MTHFD2L
Enzyme activity
| EC # | BRENDA | ExPASy | KEGG | MetaCyc |
|---|---|---|---|---|
| 1.5.1.5 | ↗ | ↗ | ↗ | ↗ |
| 1.5.1.15 | ↗ | ↗ | ↗ | ↗ |
| 3.5.4.9 | ↗ | ↗ | ↗ | ↗ |

Gene location (Human)
| Chr. | Chromosome 4 (human) |
| Band | 4q13.3 | Start | 74,114,174 bp |
| Band | 4q13.3 | End | 74,303,099 bp |

Gene location (Mouse)
| Chr. | Chromosome 5 (mouse) |
| Band | 5|5 E1 | Start | 90,931,117 bp |
| Band | 5|5 E1 | End | 91,021,368 bp |
RNA expression pattern
| Bgee | Human / Mouse (ortholog); Top expressed in: corpus epididymis; right lobe of liver; Achilles tendon; testicle; monocyte; olfactory zone of nasal mucosa; ganglionic eminence; epithelium of colon; ventricular zone; left adrenal cortex / Top expressed in: ventricular zone; medial ganglionic eminence; neural tube; hand; right kidney; genital tubercle; lobe of prostate; parotid gland; lacrimal gland; olfactory epithelium; More reference expression data |
| BioGPS | n/a |
Gene ontology
| Molecular function | oxidoreductase activity; methylenetetrahydrofolate dehydrogenase (NADP+) activity; catalytic activity; hydrolase activity; methenyltetrahydrofolate cyclohydrolase activity; methylenetetrahydrofolate dehydrogenase (NAD+) activity |
| Cellular component | mitochondrial inner membrane; membrane; mitochondrion; cytosol; mitochondrial matrix |
| Biological process | purine nucleotide biosynthetic process; methionine biosynthetic process; tetrahydrofolate interconversion; metabolism; histidine biosynthetic process; cellular amino acid biosynthetic process; one-carbon metabolic process; 10-formyltetrahydrofolate metabolic process; folic acid metabolic process; tetrahydrofolate metabolic process |
Sources:Amigo / QuickGO
Orthologs
| Databases | NCBI: entry; OMA: entry |
| Species | Human | Mouse |
| Entrez | 441024 | 665563 |
| Ensembl | ENSG00000163738 | ENSMUSG00000029376 |
| UniProt | Q9H903; Q8IY64 | D3YZG8 |
| RefSeq (mRNA) | NM_001004346; NM_001144978; NM_001351310; NM_001351311; NM_001351314 NM_001351329; NM_001351331 | NM_026788 |
| RefSeq (protein) | NP_001004346; NP_001138450; NP_001338239; NP_001338240; NP_001338243 NP_001338258; NP_001338260 | NP_081064 |
| Location (UCSC) | Chr 4: 74.11 – 74.3 Mb | Chr 5: 90.93 – 91.02 Mb |
| PubMed search |
- Wikidata
| View/Edit Human | View/Edit Mouse |

NAD-dependent methylenetetrahydrofolate dehydrogenase 2-like protein (MTHFD2L), also known as bifunctional methylenetetrahydrofolate dehydrogenase/cyclohydrolase 2, is an enzyme that in humans is encoded by the MTHFD2L gene on chromosome 4. This enzyme localizes to the inner mitochondrial membrane, where it performs the NADP+-dependent dehydrogenase/cyclohydrolase activity as part of the mitochondrial pathway to convert folate to formate. It is associated with fluctuations in cytokine secretion in response to viral infections and vaccines.

== Structure ==
The MTHFD2L gene consists of nine exons and is conserved among mammals. This gene encodes a 340-residue protein that is homologous to the mitochondrial bifunctional dehydrogenase/cyclohydrolase (MTHFD2) and to the N-terminal dehydrogenase/cyclohydrolase domains of cytoplasmic and mitochondrial C1-THF syntheses (MTHFD1 and MTHFD1L, respectively). The MTHFD2L protein contains a predicted N-terminal mitochondrial targeting sequence and four amino acids (Lys-93, Arg-206, Gly-211, and Arg-238) necessary for the protein's dehydrogenase/cyclohydrolase activity. Three classes of MTHFD2L RNA transcripts have been detected at equal levels in adult human brain and placenta, though their translation into stable proteins in vivo has not been confirmed.

== Function ==
MTHFD2L is a member of the tetrahydrofolate dehydrogenase/cyclohydrolase family. This enzyme is expressed in all adult tissues and localizes to the mitochondria, specifically as a peripheral membrane protein in the mitochondrial matrix side of the inner mitochondrial membrane. Within the mitochondria, it participates the conversion of folate to formate as part of the mitochondrial pathway for 1-carbon metabolism. In the final step of this pathway, the NADP+-dependent CH2-THF dehydrogenase/CH+-THF cyclohydrolase activity of bifunctional MTHFD2L complements the 10-CHO-THF synthetase activity of monofunctional MTHFD1L. The formate produced via the mitochondrial pathway can contribute to purine and thymidine synthesis and homocysteine remethylation into methionine, as well as be converted into 1-carbon units to fuel the cytoplasmic pathway of folate metabolism.

== Clinical significance ==
In a GWAS study concerning variations in cytokine responses observed in smallpox vaccine recipients, a number of SNPs associated with variations in IL-1β secretion were identified in or within the vicinity of the MTHFD2L gene. Identification of the genetic elements controlling cytokine secretion in response to viral infection or vaccination can improve next-generation vaccines to provide robust immune protection while avoiding adverse effects.

== See also ==
- MTHFD1
- MTHFD1L
- MTHFD2
