= MTHFD1L =

Protein-coding gene in the species Homo sapiens

Available structures
PDB	Ortholog search: PDBe RCSB
PDB	List of PDB id codes 2EO2

Identifiers
- Aliases: MTHFD1L, FTHFSDC1, MTC1THFS, dJ292B18.2, methylenetetrahydrofolate dehydrogenase (NADP+ dependent) 1-like, methylenetetrahydrofolate dehydrogenase (NADP+ dependent) 1 like
- External IDs: OMIM: 611427; MGI: 1924836; HomoloGene: 56706; GeneCards: MTHFD1L; OMA:MTHFD1L - orthologs

Gene location (Human)
Chr.	Chromosome 6 (human)
Band	6q25.1	Start	150,865,679 bp
Band	6q25.1	End	151,101,887 bp

Gene location (Mouse)
Chr.	Chromosome 10 (mouse)
Band	10|10 A1	Start	3,973,118 bp
Band	10|10 A1	End	4,167,081 bp
RNA expression pattern
Bgee	Human / Mouse (ortholog); Top expressed in: right coronary artery; stromal cell of endometrium; left coronary artery; cartilage tissue; ascending aorta; endothelial cell; tibia; tibial arteries; cerebellar hemisphere; right hemisphere of cerebellum / Top expressed in: epiblast; primitive streak; hand; tail of embryo; endothelial cell of lymphatic vessel; lens; bone marrow; calvaria; human fetus; mesenteric lymph nodes; More reference expression data
BioGPS	n/a
Gene ontology
Molecular function	nucleotide binding; protein homodimerization activity; methenyltetrahydrofolate cyclohydrolase activity; formate-tetrahydrofolate ligase activity; ligase activity; ATP binding; methylenetetrahydrofolate dehydrogenase (NADP+) activity
Cellular component	membrane; mitochondrial matrix; mitochondrion; cytoplasm
Biological process	formate metabolic process; embryonic neurocranium morphogenesis; tetrahydrofolate interconversion; tetrahydrofolate metabolic process; neural tube closure; folic acid metabolic process; embryonic viscerocranium morphogenesis; folic acid-containing compound metabolic process; purine nucleobase biosynthetic process; 10-formyltetrahydrofolate biosynthetic process; one-carbon metabolic process; folic acid-containing compound biosynthetic process
Sources:Amigo / QuickGO
Orthologs
Species	Human	Mouse
Entrez	25902	270685
Ensembl	ENSG00000120254	ENSMUSG00000040675
UniProt	Q6UB35; Q4VXM1	Q3V3R1
RefSeq (mRNA)	NM_001242767; NM_001242768; NM_001242769; NM_015440; NM_001350486 NM_001350487; NM_001350488; NM_001350489; NM_001350490; NM_001350491; NM_001350492; NM_001350493	NM_001170785; NM_001170786; NM_172308
RefSeq (protein)	NP_001229696; NP_001229697; NP_001229698; NP_056255; NP_001337415 NP_001337416; NP_001337417; NP_001337418; NP_001337419; NP_001337420; NP_001337421; NP_001337422	NP_001164256; NP_001164257; NP_758512
Location (UCSC)	Chr 6: 150.87 – 151.1 Mb	Chr 10: 3.97 – 4.17 Mb
PubMed search
- Wikidata
View/Edit Human	View/Edit Mouse

Monofunctional C1-tetrahydrofolate synthase, mitochondrial also known as formyltetrahydrofolate synthetase, is an enzyme that in humans is encoded by the MTHFD1L gene (methylenetetrahydrofolate dehydrogenase (NADP+ dependent) 1-like).

== Function ==
One-carbon substituted forms of tetrahydrofolate (THF) are involved in the de novo synthesis of purines and thymidylate and support cellular methylation reactions through the regeneration of methionine from homocysteine. MTHFD1L is an enzyme involved in THF synthesis in mitochondria.

In contrast to MTHFD1 that has trifunctional methylenetetrahydrofolate dehydrogenase, methenyltetrahydrofolate cyclohydrolase, and formyltetrahydrofolate synthetase enzymatic activities, MTHFD1L only has formyltetrahydrofolate synthetase activity.

== Clinical significance ==
Certain variants of the MTHFD1L are associated neural tube defects. Different alleles of SNP rs7646 in the 3′ UTR of MTHFD1L are differentially regulated by microRNAs affecting MTHFD1L expression.
