= D-alanine 2-hydroxymethyltransferase =

Identifiers
- EC no.: 2.1.2.7
- CAS no.: 9075-76-7

Databases
- IntEnz: IntEnz view
- BRENDA: BRENDA entry
- ExPASy: NiceZyme view
- KEGG: KEGG entry
- MetaCyc: metabolic pathway
- PRIAM: profile
- PDB structures: RCSB PDB PDBe PDBsum
- Gene Ontology: AmiGO / QuickGO
Search
- PMC: articles
- PubMed: articles
- NCBI: proteins

D-alanine 2-hydroxymethyltransferase (EC 2.1.2.7) is an enzyme that catalyzes the chemical reaction

D-alanine
+ 5,10-CH_{2}-THF
H_{2}O
H_{2}O
2-methyl-L-serine
+ THF

This tetrahydrofolate–dependent enzyme catalyzes a reversible substitution of the formyl group from the cofactor 10-methylenetetrahydrofolate (5,10-CH_{2}-THF) to D-alanine to give 2-methyl-L-serine and tetrahydrofolic acid (THF).

This enzyme belongs to the family of transferases that transfer one-carbon groups, specifically the hydroxymethyl-, formyl- and related transferases. The systematic name of this enzyme class is 5,10-methylenetetrahydrofolate:D-alanine 2-hydroxymethyltransferase. This enzyme is also called 2-methylserine hydroxymethyltransferase. This enzyme participates in the one carbon pool by folate.
