= Methylenetetrahydrofolate dehydrogenase (NAD+) =

methylenetetrahydrofolate dehydrogenase (NAD^{+})

Identifiers
- EC no.: 1.5.1.15
- CAS no.: 82062-90-6

Databases
- IntEnz: IntEnz view
- BRENDA: BRENDA entry
- ExPASy: NiceZyme view
- KEGG: KEGG entry
- MetaCyc: metabolic pathway
- PRIAM: profile
- PDB structures: RCSB PDB PDBe PDBsum
- Gene Ontology: AmiGO / QuickGO
Search
- PMC: articles
- PubMed: articles
- NCBI: proteins

In enzymology, methylenetetrahydrofolate dehydrogenase (NAD^{+}) (EC 1.5.1.15) is an enzyme that catalyzes the chemical reaction.

5,10-Methylenetetrahydrofolate
+ NAD^{+}
H^{+}
H^{+}
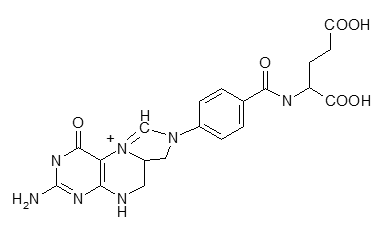
5,10-Methenyltetrahydrofolate
+ NADH

The two substrates of this enzyme are 5,10-methylenetetrahydrofolate and oxidised nicotinamide adenine dinucleotide (NAD^{+}). Its products are 5,10-methenyltetrahydrofolate, reduced NADH, and a proton.

This enzyme belongs to the family of oxidoreductases, specifically those acting on the CH-NH group of donors with NAD^{+} or NADP^{+} as acceptor. The systematic name of this enzyme class is 5,10-methylenetetrahydrofolate:NAD^{+} oxidoreductase. This enzyme is also called methylenetetrahydrofolate dehydrogenase (NAD^{+}). This enzyme participates in one carbon pool by folate.

== Structural studies ==
As of late 2007, two structures have been solved for this class of enzymes, with PDB accession codes 1EDZ and 1EE9.
