= Methylenetetrahydrofolate reductase (ferredoxin) =

Identifiers
- EC no.: 1.5.7.1

Databases
- IntEnz: IntEnz view
- BRENDA: BRENDA entry
- ExPASy: NiceZyme view
- KEGG: KEGG entry
- MetaCyc: metabolic pathway
- PRIAM: profile
- PDB structures: RCSB PDB PDBe PDBsum
Search
- PMC: articles
- PubMed: articles
- NCBI: proteins

In enzymology, a methylenetetrahydrofolate reductase (ferredoxin) (EC 1.5.7.1) is an enzyme that catalyzes the chemical reaction

5-methyltetrahydrofolate + 2 oxidized ferredoxin $\rightleftharpoons$ 5,10-methylenetetrahydrofolate + 2 reduced ferredoxin + 2 H^{+}

Thus, the two substrates of this enzyme are 5-methyltetrahydrofolate and oxidized ferredoxin, whereas its 3 products are 5,10-methylenetetrahydrofolate, reduced ferredoxin, and H^{+}.

This enzyme belongs to the family of oxidoreductases, specifically those acting on the CH-NH group of donors with an iron-sulfur protein as acceptor. The systematic name of this enzyme class is 5-methyltetrahydrofolate:ferredoxin oxidoreductase. This enzyme is also called 5,10-methylenetetrahydrofolate reductase. This enzyme participates in one carbon pool by folate.
