= UDP-4-amino-4-deoxy-L-arabinose formyltransferase =

Class of enzymes

Identifiers
- EC no.: 2.1.2.13

Databases
- IntEnz: IntEnz view
- BRENDA: BRENDA entry
- ExPASy: NiceZyme view
- KEGG: KEGG entry
- MetaCyc: metabolic pathway
- PRIAM: profile
- PDB structures: RCSB PDB PDBe PDBsum
Search
- PMC: articles
- PubMed: articles
- NCBI: proteins

UDP-4-amino-4-deoxy-L-arabinose formyltransferase (EC 2.1.2.13, UDP-L-Ara4N formyltransferase, ArnAFT) is an enzyme with systematic name 10-formyltetrahydrofolate:UDP-4-amino-4-deoxy-beta-L-arabinose N-formyltransferase. This enzyme catalyses the following chemical reaction

10-formyltetrahydrofolate + UDP-4-amino-4-deoxy-beta-L-arabinopyranose $\rightleftharpoons$ 5,6,7,8-tetrahydrofolate + UDP-4-deoxy-4-formamido-beta-L-arabinopyranose

The activity is part of a bifunctional enzyme that also performs the EC 1.1.1.305 reaction.
