= Thymidylate synthase (FAD) =

thymidylate synthase (FAD)
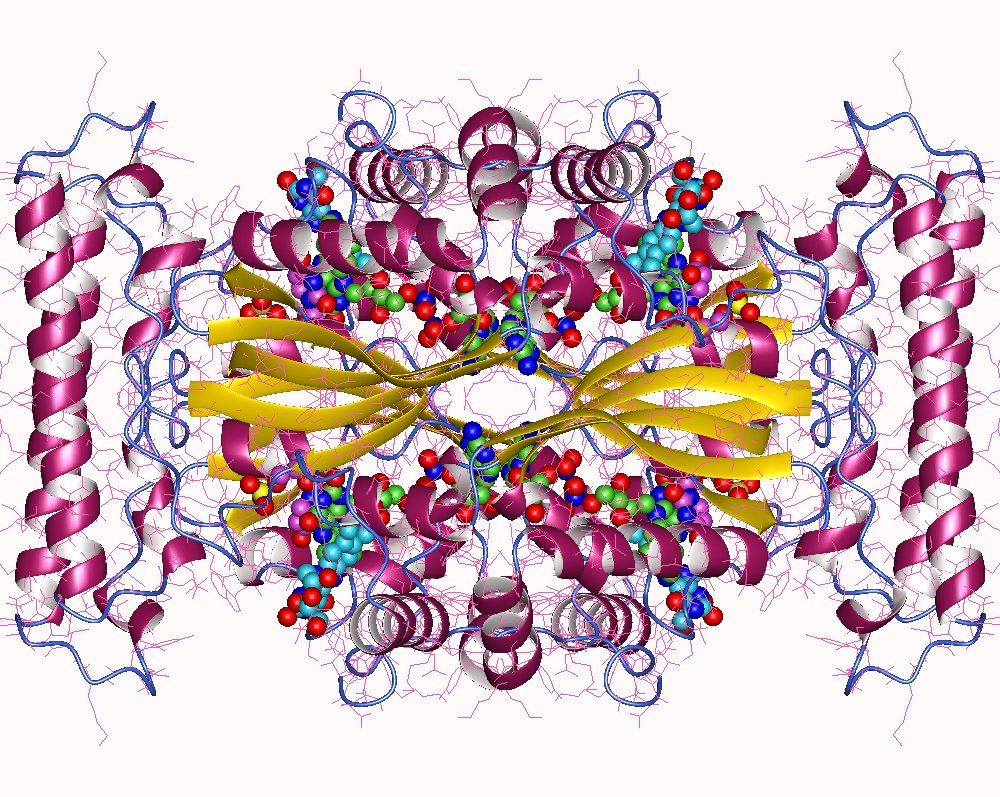
- Flavin-dependent thymidylate synthase tetramer, Thermotoga maritima

Identifiers
- EC no.: 2.1.1.148
- CAS no.: 850167-13-4

Databases
- IntEnz: IntEnz view
- BRENDA: BRENDA entry
- ExPASy: NiceZyme view
- KEGG: KEGG entry
- MetaCyc: metabolic pathway
- PRIAM: profile
- PDB structures: RCSB PDB PDBe PDBsum
- Gene Ontology: AmiGO / QuickGO
Search
- PMC: articles
- PubMed: articles
- NCBI: proteins

In enzymology, a thymidylate synthase (FAD) (EC 2.1.1.148) is an enzyme that catalyzes the chemical reaction

5,10-methylenetetrahydrofolate + dUMP + FADH_{2} $\rightleftharpoons$ dTMP + tetrahydrofolate + FAD

The 3 substrates of this enzyme are 5,10-methylenetetrahydrofolate, dUMP, and FADH2, whereas its 3 products are dTMP, tetrahydrofolate, and FAD.

This enzyme belongs to the family of transferases, to be specific those transferring one-carbon group methyltransferases. The systematic name of this enzyme class is 5,10-methylenetetrahydrofolate,FADH2:dUMP C-methyltransferase. Other names in common use include Thy1, and ThyX. This enzyme participates in pyrimidine metabolism and one carbon pool by folate.

Most organisms, including humans, use the thyA- or TYMS-encoded classic thymidylate synthase whereas some bacteria use the similar flavin-dependent thymidylate synthase (FDTS) instead.

== Structural studies ==
As of late 2007, 3 structures have been solved for this class of enzymes, with PDB accession codes 2AF6, 2CFA, and 2GQ2.

== See also ==
- Thymidylate synthetase
