= Thymidylate 5'-phosphatase =

Class of enzymes

thymidylate 5′-phosphatase

Identifiers
- EC no.: 3.1.3.35
- CAS no.: 9026-80-6

Databases
- BRENDA: enzyme data
- ExPASy: NiceZyme view
- KEGG: enzyme entry
- MetaCyc: metabolic pathway
- Rhea: reactions
- PDB structures: RCSB PDB PDBe PDBsum
- Gene Ontology: AmiGO / QuickGO
Search
- PMC: articles
- PubMed: articles
- NCBI: proteins

The enzyme thymidylate 5′-phosphatase (EC 3.1.3.35) catalyzes the reaction

thymidine monophosphate
H_{2}O
P_{i}
thymidine

The enzyme characterised from Bacillus subtilis hydrolyses thymidine monophosphate to thymidine and orthophosphate. Thermodynamic properties for the reaction have been calculated.

This enzyme is a hydrolase, specifically one acting on phosphoric monoester bonds. The systematic name is thymidylate 5′-phosphohydrolase. Other names in use include thymidylate 5′-nucleotidase, deoxythymidylate 5′-nucleotidase, thymidylate nucleotidase, deoxythymidylic 5′-nucleotidase, deoxythymidylate phosphohydrolase, and dTMPase.
