= Glycine formimidoyltransferase =

Identifiers
- EC no.: 2.1.2.4
- CAS no.: 9029-84-9

Databases
- IntEnz: IntEnz view
- BRENDA: BRENDA entry
- ExPASy: NiceZyme view
- KEGG: KEGG entry
- MetaCyc: metabolic pathway
- PRIAM: profile
- PDB structures: RCSB PDB PDBe PDBsum
- Gene Ontology: AmiGO / QuickGO
Search
- PMC: articles
- PubMed: articles
- NCBI: proteins

Glycine formimidoyltransferase (EC 2.1.2.4) is an enzyme that catalyzes the chemical reaction

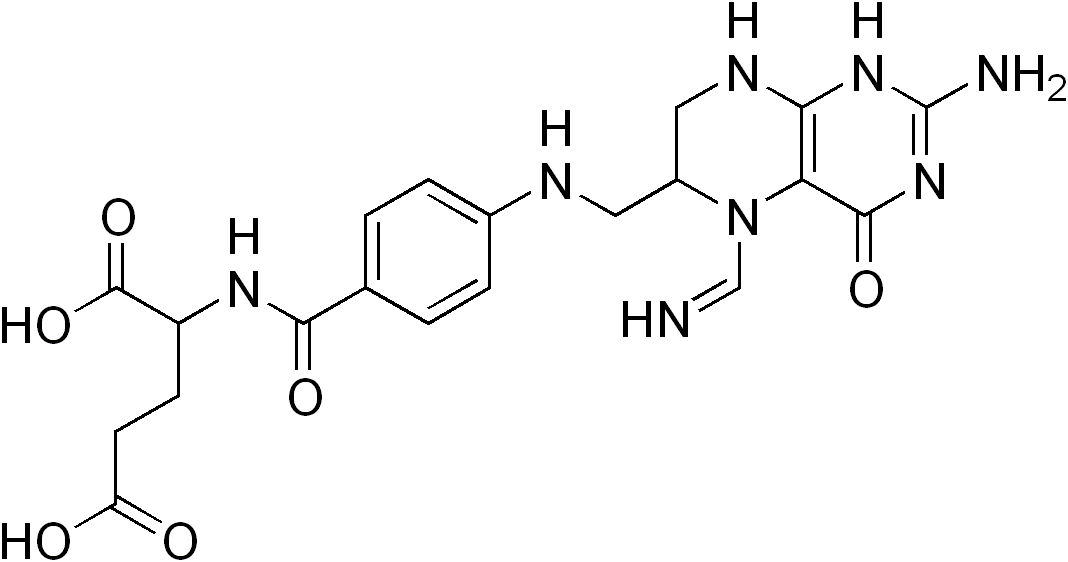
5-Formiminotetrahydrofolate
+
Glycine
N-Formimidoylglycine
+ THF

This tetrahydrofolate–dependent enzyme catalyzes a nucleophilic acyl substitution of the formimino group from the cofactor 5-formiminotetrahydrofolate to glycine, giving N-formimidoylglycine, with tetrahydrofolate (THF) as a byproduct. The enzyme can act in reverse to produce 5-formiminotetrahydrofolate.

This enzyme belongs to the family of transferases that transfer one-carbon groups, specifically the hydroxymethyl-, formyl- and related transferases. The systematic name of this enzyme class is 5-formimidoyltetrahydrofolate:glycine N-formimidoyltransferase. Other names in common use include formiminoglycine formiminotransferase, FIG formiminotransferase, and glycine formiminotransferase. This enzyme participates in purine metabolism.
