= C20H23N7O7 =

The molecular formula C_{20}H_{23}N_{7}O_{7} (molar mass: 473.44 g/mol, exact mass: 473.1659 u) may refer to:

- Folinic acid
- 10-Formyltetrahydrofolate (10-CHO-THF)
