= FTCD (disambiguation) =

FTCD may refer to:

- Formimidoyltransferase cyclodeaminase (symbol FTCD), an enzyme
- Functional transcranial Doppler (fTCD) sonography, a type of transcranial Doppler sonography
- Fellow of Trinity College Dublin
