= Methylenetetrahydrofolate—tRNA-(uracil-5-)-methyltransferase =

methylenetetrahydrofolate-tRNA-(uracil-5-)-methyltransferase (FADH2-oxidizing)

Identifiers
- EC no.: 2.1.1.74
- CAS no.: 74665-78-4

Databases
- IntEnz: IntEnz view
- BRENDA: BRENDA entry
- ExPASy: NiceZyme view
- KEGG: KEGG entry
- MetaCyc: metabolic pathway
- PRIAM: profile
- PDB structures: RCSB PDB PDBe PDBsum
- Gene Ontology: AmiGO / QuickGO
Search
- PMC: articles
- PubMed: articles
- NCBI: proteins

In enzymology, a methylenetetrahydrofolate-tRNA-(uracil-5-)-methyltransferase (EC 2.1.1.74) is an enzyme that catalyzes the chemical reaction

5,10-methylenetetrahydrofolate + tRNA containing uridine at position 54 + FADH_{2} $\rightleftharpoons$ tetrahydrofolate + tRNA containing ribothymidine at position 54 + FAD

The 3 substrates of this enzyme are 5,10-methylenetetrahydrofolate, tRNA containing uridine at position 54, and FADH2, whereas its 3 products are tetrahydrofolate, tRNA containing ribothymidine at position 54, and FAD.

This enzyme belongs to the family of transferases, specifically those transferring one-carbon group methyltransferases. The systematic name of this enzyme class is 5,10-methylenetetrahydrofolate:tRNA (uracil-5-)-methyl-transferase. Other names in common use include (FADH2-oxidizing), folate-dependent ribothymidyl synthase, methylenetetrahydrofolate-transfer ribonucleate uracil, 5-methyltransferase, 5,10-methylenetetrahydrofolate:tRNA-UPsiC, and (uracil-5-)-methyl-transferase.
