= Thy =

THY or Thy may refer to:

- Thy, the genitive case of the English personal pronoun thou (archaic)
- Thy (district), Jutland, Denmark
- Thymine, one of the four nucleobases in the nucleic acid of DNA
- Turkish Airlines (ICAO: THY, from Turkish Türk Hava Yolları)
- The first month in the Egyptian Middle Kingdom lunar calendar
- Lennart Thy (born 1992), German footballer

== See also ==
- Thy1 (disambiguation)
