= MTHFD2 =

Protein-coding gene in the species Homo sapiens

Identifiers
- Aliases: MTHFD2, NMDMC, methylenetetrahydrofolate dehydrogenase (NADP+ dependent) 2, methenyltetrahydrofolate cyclohydrolase
- External IDs: OMIM: 604887; MGI: 1338850; GeneCards: MTHFD2
Available structures
PDB	Ortholog search: PDBe RCSB
PDB	List of PDB id codes 1ZN4
Enzyme activity
EC #	BRENDA	ExPASy	KEGG	MetaCyc
1.5.1.15	↗	↗	↗	↗
3.5.4.9	↗	↗	↗	↗

Gene location (Human)
Chr.	Chromosome 2 (human)
Band	2p13.1	Start	74,186,172 bp
Band	2p13.1	End	74,217,565 bp

Gene location (Mouse)
Chr.	Chromosome 6 (mouse)
Band	6 C3|6 35.94 cM	Start	83,282,673 bp
Band	6 C3|6 35.94 cM	End	83,302,890 bp
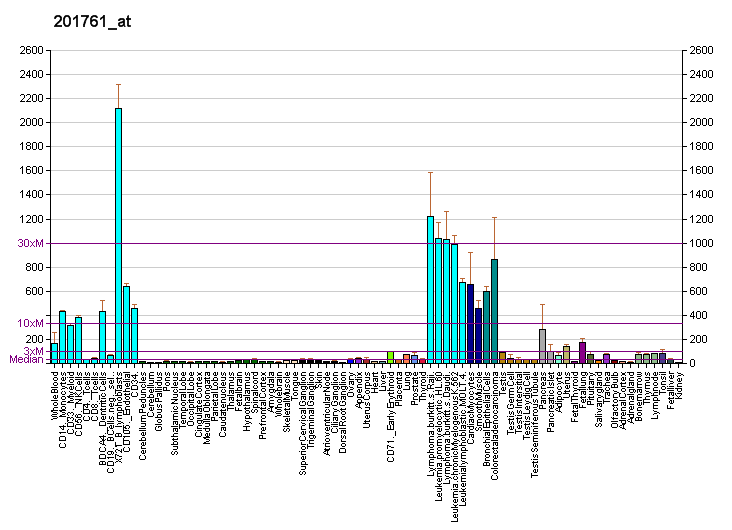
RNA expression pattern
Bgee	Human / Mouse (ortholog); Top expressed in: cartilage tissue; Descending thoracic aorta; popliteal artery; tibial arteries; ascending aorta; gonad; left coronary artery; right coronary artery; stromal cell of endometrium; tibia / Top expressed in: lacrimal gland; seminal vesicula; Ileal epithelium; zygote; calvaria; secondary oocyte; primary oocyte; primitive streak; Paneth cell; salivary gland; More reference expression data
BioGPS	More reference expression data
Gene ontology
Molecular function	oxidoreductase activity; catalytic activity; hydrolase activity; methenyltetrahydrofolate cyclohydrolase activity; magnesium ion binding; methylenetetrahydrofolate dehydrogenase (NAD+) activity; methylenetetrahydrofolate dehydrogenase (NADP+) activity; phosphate ion binding
Cellular component	mitochondrion; cytosol; mitochondrial matrix; extracellular space
Biological process	metabolism; one-carbon metabolic process; tetrahydrofolate metabolic process; folic acid metabolic process; tetrahydrofolate interconversion
Sources:Amigo / QuickGO
Orthologs
Databases	NCBI: entry; OMA: entry
Species	Human	Mouse
Entrez	10797	17768
Ensembl	ENSG00000065911	ENSMUSG00000005667
UniProt	P13995	P18155
RefSeq (mRNA)	NM_001040409; NM_006636	NM_008638
RefSeq (protein)	NP_006627	NP_032664
Location (UCSC)	Chr 2: 74.19 – 74.22 Mb	Chr 6: 83.28 – 83.3 Mb
PubMed search
- Wikidata
View/Edit Human	View/Edit Mouse

Bifunctional methylenetetrahydrofolate dehydrogenase/cyclohydrolase, mitochondrial is an enzyme that in humans is encoded by the MTHFD2 gene.

This gene encodes a nuclear-encoded mitochondrial bifunctional enzyme with methylenetetrahydrofolate dehydrogenase and methenyltetrahydrofolate cyclohydrolase activities. The enzyme functions as a homodimer and is unique in its absolute requirement for magnesium and inorganic phosphate. Formation of the enzyme-magnesium complex allows binding of NAD. Alternative splicing results in multiple transcripts encoding different isoforms. This gene has a pseudogene on chromosome 7.
