= Formyltetrahydrofolate deformylase =

Class of enzymes

Identifiers
- EC no.: 3.5.1.10
- CAS no.: 9025-08-5

Databases
- BRENDA: enzyme data
- ExPASy: NiceZyme view
- KEGG: enzyme entry
- MetaCyc: metabolic pathway
- Rhea: reactions
- PDB structures: RCSB PDB PDBe PDBsum
- Gene Ontology: AmiGO / QuickGO
Search
- PMC: articles
- PubMed: articles
- NCBI: proteins

Formyltetrahydrofolate deformylase (EC 3.5.1.10) is an enzyme that catalyzes the chemical reaction

10-formyltetrahydrofolate
H_{2}O
tetrahydrofolic acid
+
formic acid

The enzyme hydrolyses 10-formyltetrahydrofolate to tetrahydrofolic acid and formic acid. This reaction is part of the metabolism of one-carbon units in plants and other organisms.

This enzyme is a hydrolase, one acting on carbon-nitrogen bonds other than peptide bonds, specifically in linear amides. The systematic name of this enzyme class is 10-formyltetrahydrofolate amidohydrolase.
