= Methylenetetrahydrofolate dehydrogenase (NADP+) =

methylenetetrahydrofolate dehydrogenase (NADP+)
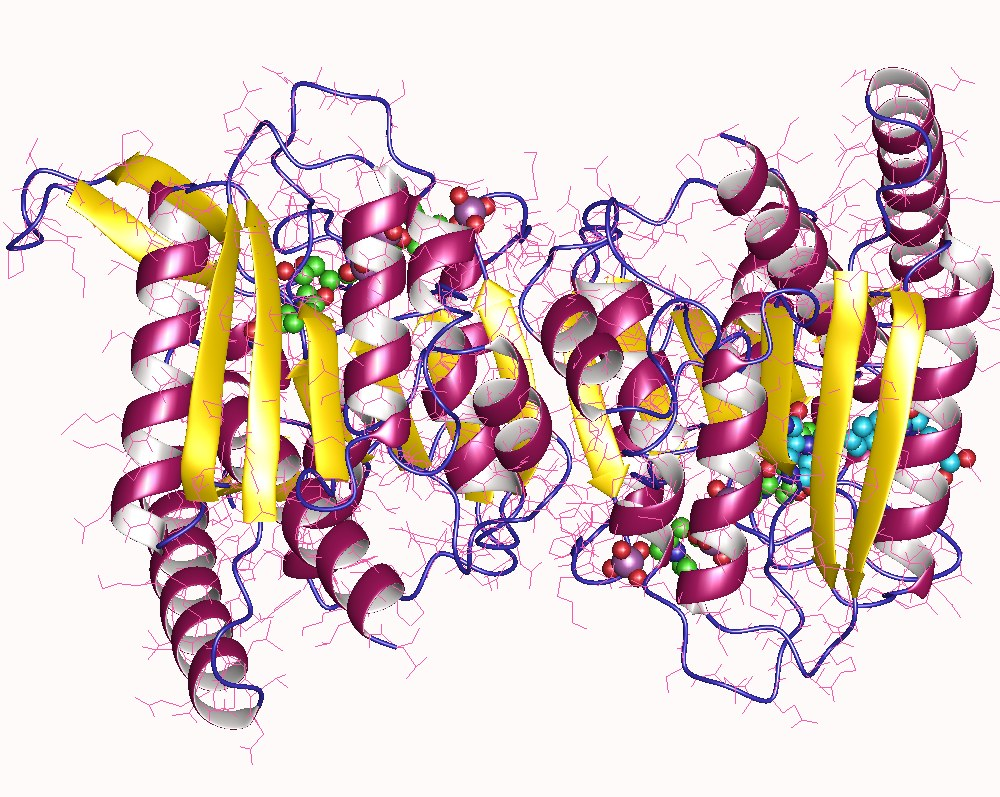
- Methylenetetrahydrofolate dehydrogenase dimer, Human

Identifiers
- EC no.: 1.5.1.5
- CAS no.: 9029-14-5

Databases
- IntEnz: IntEnz view
- BRENDA: BRENDA entry
- ExPASy: NiceZyme view
- KEGG: KEGG entry
- MetaCyc: metabolic pathway
- PRIAM: profile
- PDB structures: RCSB PDB PDBe PDBsum
- Gene Ontology: AmiGO / QuickGO
Search
- PMC: articles
- PubMed: articles
- NCBI: proteins

In enzymology, a methylenetetrahydrofolate dehydrogenase (NADP+) (EC 1.5.1.5) is an enzyme that catalyzes the chemical reaction

5,10-methylenetetrahydrofolate + NADP^{+} $\rightleftharpoons$ 5,10-methenyltetrahydrofolate + NADPH + H^{+}

Thus, the two substrates of this enzyme are 5,10-methylenetetrahydrofolate and NADP^{+}, whereas its 3 products are 5,10-methenyltetrahydrofolate, NADPH, and H^{+}.

This enzyme belongs to the family of oxidoreductases, specifically those acting on the CH-NH group of donors with NAD+ or NADP+ as acceptor. This enzyme participates in glyoxylate and dicarboxylate metabolism and one carbon pool by folate.

== Structural studies ==
As of late 2007, 8 structures have been solved for this class of enzymes, with PDB accession codes 1A4I, 1DIA, 1DIB, 1DIG, 1LU9, 1LUA, 2C2X, and 2C2Y.

== Clinical significance ==
Mutations of the MTHFD1 gene may disrupt the activity of the enzyme and cause methylenetetrahydrofolate dehydrogenase 1 deficiency, also known as combined immunodeficiency and megaloblastic anemia with or without hyperhomocysteinemia (CIMAH).

== Alternative names ==
The systematic name of this enzyme class is 5,10-methylenetetrahydrofolate:NADP+ oxidoreductase. Other names in common use include N5,N10-methylenetetrahydrofolate dehydrogenase, 5,10-methylenetetrahydrofolate:NADP oxidoreductase, 5,10-methylenetetrahydrofolate dehydrogenase, methylenetetrahydrofolate dehydrogenase, and methylenetetrahydrofolate dehydrogenase (NADP).
