= Formimidoyltransferase cyclodeaminase =

Enzyme found in humans

FTCD

Identifiers
- Aliases: FTCD, LCHC1, formimidoyltransferase cyclodeaminase
- External IDs: OMIM: 606806; MGI: 1339962; GeneCards: FTCD
Enzyme activity
EC #	BRENDA	ExPASy	KEGG	MetaCyc
2.1.2.5	↗	↗	↗	↗
4.3.1.4	↗	↗	↗	↗

Gene location (Human)
Chr.	Chromosome 21 (human)
Band	21q22.3	Start	46,136,160 bp
Band	21q22.3	End	46,155,579 bp

Gene location (Mouse)
Chr.	Chromosome 10 (mouse)
Band	10 C1|10 39.25 cM	Start	76,411,482 bp
Band	10 C1|10 39.25 cM	End	76,426,172 bp
RNA expression pattern
Bgee	Human / Mouse (ortholog); Top expressed in: right lobe of liver; human kidney; right testis; left testis; kidney tubule; putamen; nucleus accumbens; right frontal lobe; caudate nucleus; renal cortex / Top expressed in: left lobe of liver; right kidney; proximal tubule; human kidney; sexually immature organism; atrioventricular junction; embryo; yolk sac; atrium; atrioventricular valve; More reference expression data
BioGPS	n/a
Gene ontology
Molecular function	transferase activity; microtubule binding; folic acid binding; protein binding; catalytic activity; lyase activity; formimidoyltetrahydrofolate cyclodeaminase activity; glutamate formimidoyltransferase activity
Cellular component	cytoplasm; cytosol; Golgi apparatus; Golgi membrane; smooth endoplasmic reticulum membrane; endoplasmic reticulum; centriole; extracellular exosome; cytoskeleton; endoplasmic reticulum-Golgi intermediate compartment; plasma membrane
Biological process	histidine metabolic process; histidine catabolic process to glutamate and formate; tetrahydrofolate interconversion; cell metabolism; cytoskeleton organization; histidine catabolic process; metabolism; histidine catabolic process to glutamate and formamide; folic acid-containing compound metabolic process
Sources:Amigo / QuickGO
Orthologs
Databases	NCBI: entry; OMA: entry
Species	Human	Mouse
Entrez	10841	14317
Ensembl	ENSG00000160282; ENSG00000281775	ENSMUSG00000001155
UniProt	O95954	Q91XD4
RefSeq (mRNA)	NM_006657; NM_206965; NM_001320412	NM_080845
RefSeq (protein)	NP_001307341; NP_006648; NP_996848	NP_543121
Location (UCSC)	Chr 21: 46.14 – 46.16 Mb	Chr 10: 76.41 – 76.43 Mb
PubMed search
- Wikidata
View/Edit Human	View/Edit Mouse

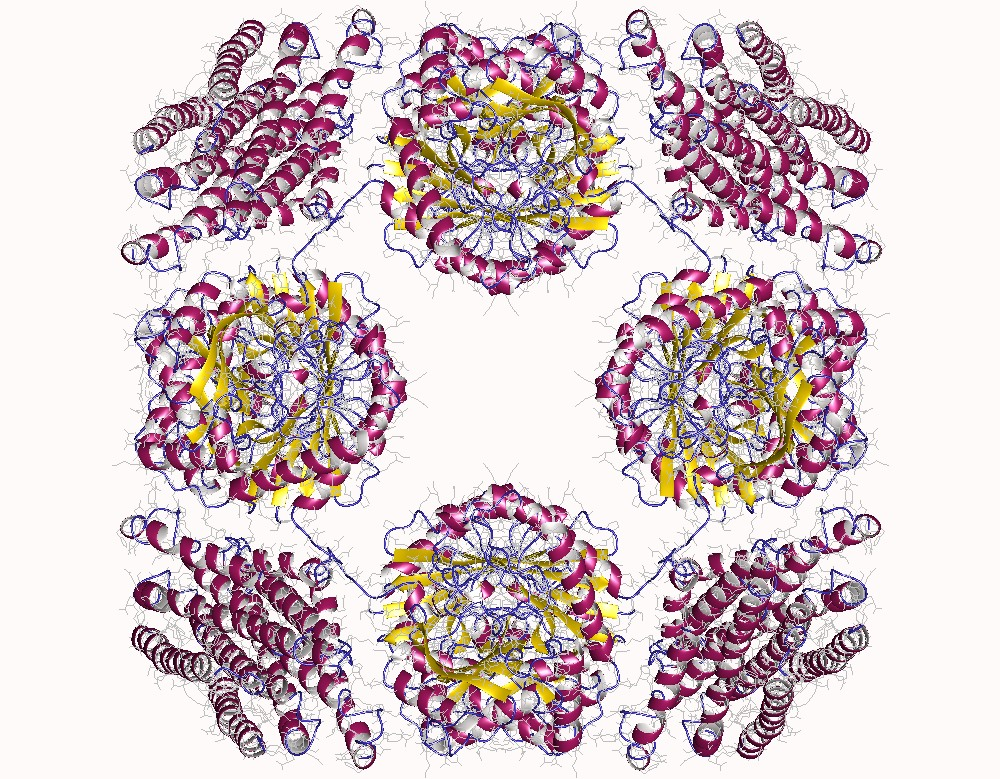
Formiminotransferase cyclodeaminase homooctamer, Rattus norvegicus

Formimidoyltransferase cyclodeaminase or formiminotransferase cyclodeaminase (gene symbol FTCD in humans) is a bifunctional enzyme that catalyzes the following reactions:

- conversion of formiminoglutamate and tetrahydrofolate into formiminotetrahydrofolate and glutamate (glutamate formimidoyltransferase activity, EC 2.1.2.5)
- subsequent deamination of formiminotetrahydrofolate to 5,10-methenyltetrahydrofolate and ammonia (formimidoyltetrahydrofolate cyclodeaminase activity, EC 4.3.1.4)

Its name comes from the two activities it catalyzes.

== Role in pathology ==
Mutations of the FTCD gene cause glutamate formiminotransferase deficiency.

== See also ==
- Glutamate-1-semialdehyde
