= Formyltetrahydrofolate dehydrogenase =

formyltetrahydrofolate dehydrogenase

Identifiers
- EC no.: 1.5.1.6
- CAS no.: 37256-25-0

Databases
- IntEnz: IntEnz view
- BRENDA: BRENDA entry
- ExPASy: NiceZyme view
- KEGG: KEGG entry
- MetaCyc: metabolic pathway
- PRIAM: profile
- PDB structures: RCSB PDB PDBe PDBsum
- Gene Ontology: AmiGO / QuickGO
Search
- PMC: articles
- PubMed: articles
- NCBI: proteins

In enzymology, formyltetrahydrofolate dehydrogenase (EC 1.5.1.6) is an enzyme that catalyzes the chemical reaction

10-Formyltetrahydrofolate
+ NADP^{+}
H_{2}O
H^{+}
H_{2}O
H^{+}
Tetrahydrofolic acid
+ CO_{2} + NADPH

The three substrates of this enzyme are 10-formyltetrahydrofolate, oxidised nicotinamide adenine dinucleotide phosphate (NADP^{+}), and water. Its products are tetrahydrofolic acid, carbon dioxide, reduced NADPH, and a proton.

This enzyme belongs to the family of oxidoreductases, to be specific those acting on the CH-NH group of donors with NAD+ or NADP+ as acceptor. The systematic name of this enzyme class is 10-formyltetrahydrofolate:NADP+ oxidoreductase. Other names in common use include 10-formyl tetrahydrofolate:NADP oxidoreductase, 10-formyl-H2PtGlu:NADP oxidoreductase, 10-formyl-H4folate dehydrogenase, N10-formyltetrahydrofolate dehydrogenase, and 10-formyltetrahydrofolate dehydrogenase. This enzyme participates in one carbon pool by folate.

== Structural studies ==
As of late 2007, 7 structures have been solved for this class of enzymes, with PDB accession codes 1S3I, 2BW0, 2CFI, 2CQ8, 2O2P, 2O2Q, and 2O2R.
