= Formimidoyltetrahydrofolate cyclodeaminase =

Class of enzymes

Identifiers
- EC no.: 4.3.1.4
- CAS no.: 9032-05-7

Databases
- BRENDA: enzyme data
- ExPASy: NiceZyme view
- KEGG: enzyme entry
- MetaCyc: metabolic pathway
- Rhea: reactions
- PDB structures: RCSB PDB PDBe PDBsum
- Gene Ontology: AmiGO / QuickGO
Search
- PMC: articles
- PubMed: articles
- NCBI: proteins

Formimidoyltetrahydrofolate cyclodeaminase (EC 4.3.1.4) is an enzyme characterised from Clostridium cylinrosporium that catalyzes a cyclisation reaction that converts 5-formimidoyltetrahydrofolate to 5,10-methenyltetrahydrofolate, with loss of ammonia:

5-formimidoyltetrahydrofolate
NH_{3}
5,10-methenyltetrahydrofolate

In mammals, this enzyme can be found as part of a bifunctional enzyme in a single polypeptide with glutamate formimidoyltransferase (EC 2.1.2.5), the enzyme activity that catalyses the previous step in the histidine catabolic pathway. This arrangement allows the 5-formimidoyltetrahydrofolate intermediate to move directly from one active site to another without being released into solution, in a process called substrate channeling.

This enzyme is a lyases, specifically ammonia lyases, which cleave carbon-nitrogen bonds. The systematic name of this enzyme class is 5-formimidoyltetrahydrofolate ammonia-lyase (cyclizing 5,10-methenyltetrahydrofolate-forming). Other names in common use include formiminotetrahydrofolate cyclodeaminase, and 5-formimidoyltetrahydrofolate ammonia-lyase (cyclizing). It participates in folate metabolism by catabolising histidine and adding to the C_{1}-tetrahydrofolate pool.

== Structural studies ==
As of late 2007, 3 structures have been solved for this class of enzymes, with PDB accession codes PDB: 1O5H, PDB: 1TT9, and PDB: 2PFD.
