= Formate–tetrahydrofolate ligase =

Formate—tetrahydrofolate ligase

Identifiers
- EC no.: 6.3.4.3
- CAS no.: 9023-66-9

Databases
- BRENDA: enzyme data
- ExPASy: NiceZyme view
- KEGG: enzyme entry
- MetaCyc: metabolic pathway
- Rhea: reactions
- PDB structures: RCSB PDB PDBe PDBsum
- Gene Ontology: AmiGO / QuickGO
Search
- PMC: articles
- PubMed: articles
- NCBI: proteins

Formate—tetrahydrofolate ligase
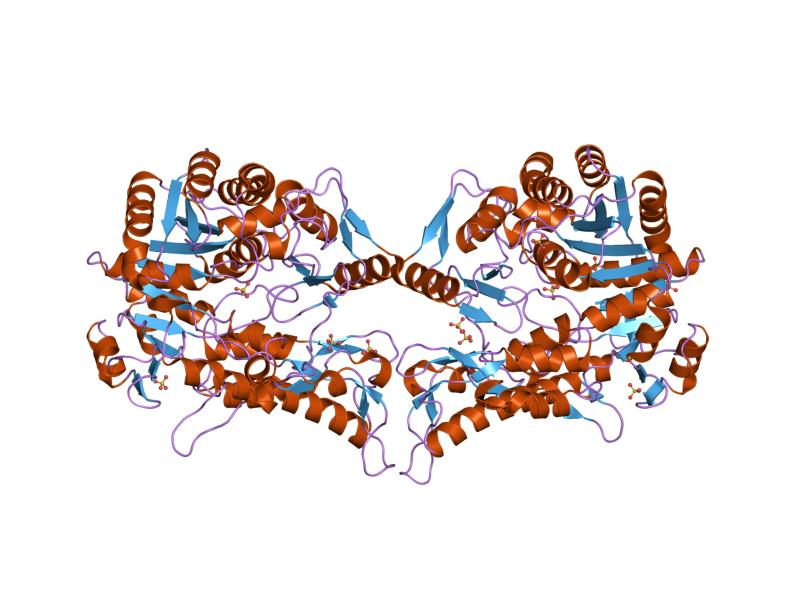
- the crystal structure of formyltetrahydrofolate synthetase from moorella thermoacetica

Identifiers
- Symbol: FTHFS
- Pfam: PF01268
- Pfam clan: CL0023
- InterPro: IPR000559
- PROSITE: PDOC00595
- SCOP2: 1fpm / SCOPe / SUPFAM
Available protein structures:
- PDB: IPR000559 PF01268 (ECOD; PDBsum)
- AlphaFold: IPR000559; PF01268

In enzymology, a formate—tetrahydrofolate ligase (EC 6.3.4.3) is an enzyme that catalyzes the chemical reaction

ATP + formate + tetrahydrofolate $\rightleftharpoons$ ADP + phosphate + 10-formyltetrahydrofolate

The 3 substrates of this enzyme are ATP, formate, and tetrahydrofolate, whereas its 3 products are ADP, phosphate, and 10-formyltetrahydrofolate.

This enzyme belongs to the family of ligases, specifically those forming generic carbon-nitrogen bonds. This enzyme participates in glyoxylate and dicarboxylate metabolism and one carbon pool by folate.

In eukaryotes the FTHFS activity is expressed by a multifunctional enzyme, C-1-tetrahydrofolate synthase (C1-THF synthase), which also catalyses the dehydrogenase and cyclohydrolase activities. Two forms of C1-THF syntheses are known, one is located in the mitochondrial matrix, while the second one is cytoplasmic. In both forms the FTHFS domain consists of about 600 amino acid residues and is located in the C-terminal section of C1-THF synthase. In prokaryotes FTHFS activity is expressed by a monofunctional homotetrameric enzyme of about 560 amino acid residues.

== Nomenclature ==
The systematic name of this enzyme class is formate:tetrahydrofolate ligase (ADP-forming). Other names in common use include:

- formyltetrahydrofolate synthetase,
- 10-formyltetrahydrofolate synthetase,
- tetrahydrofolic formylase, and
- tetrahydrofolate formylase.

== Examples ==
Human genes encoding formate-tetrahydrofolate ligases include:

- MTHFD1 – cytoplasmic
- MTHFD1L – mitochondrial

== Structural studies ==
As of late 2007, 3 structures have been solved for this class of enzymes, with PDB accession codes PDB: 1EG7, PDB: 1FP7, and PDB: 1FPM.

The crystal structure of N(10)-formyltetrahydrofolate synthetase from Moorella thermoacetica shows that the subunit is composed of three domains organised around three mixed beta-sheets. There are two cavities between adjacent domains. One of them was identified as the nucleotide binding site by homology modelling. The large domain contains a seven-stranded beta-sheet surrounded by helices on both sides. The second domain contains a five-stranded beta-sheet with two alpha-helices packed on one side while the other two are a wall of the active site cavity. The third domain contains a four-stranded beta-sheet forming a half-barrel. The concave side is covered by two helices while the convex side is another wall of the large cavity. Arg 97 is likely involved in formyl phosphate binding. The tetrameric molecule is relatively flat with the shape of the letter X, and the active sites are located at the end of the subunits far from the subunit interface.

== Related enzymes ==
The reverse reaction converting 10-formyltetrahydrofolate to tetrahydrofolate is performed by formyltetrahydrofolate dehydrogenase.
