= UDP-glucuronic acid dehydrogenase =

Class of enzymes

UDP-glucuronic acid dehydrogenase (UDP-4-keto-hexauronic acid decarboxylating)

Identifiers
- EC no.: 1.1.1.305

Databases
- IntEnz: IntEnz view
- BRENDA: BRENDA entry
- ExPASy: NiceZyme view
- KEGG: KEGG entry
- MetaCyc: metabolic pathway
- PRIAM: profile
- PDB structures: RCSB PDB PDBe PDBsum
Search
- PMC: articles
- PubMed: articles
- NCBI: proteins

UDP-glucuronic acid dehydrogenase (UDP-4-keto-hexauronic acid decarboxylating) (EC 1.1.1.305, UDP-GlcUA decarboxylase, ArnADH) is an enzyme with systematic name UDP-glucuronate:NAD^{+} oxidoreductase (decarboxylating). This enzyme catalyses the following chemical reaction

UDP-glucuronate + NAD^{+} $\rightleftharpoons$ UDP-beta-L-threo-pentapyranos-4-ulose + CO_{2} + NADH + H^{+}

The activity is part of a bifunctional enzyme also performing the reaction of EC 2.1.2.13 (UDP-4-amino-4-deoxy-L-arabinose formyltransferase).
