= MTHFD1 =

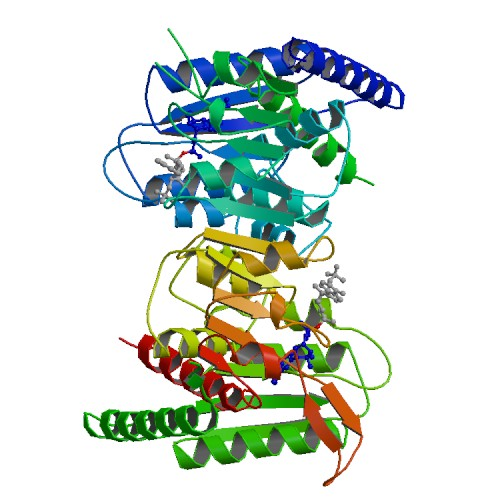

Identifiers
- Aliases: MTHFD1, MTHFC, MTHFD, C1-THF-Synthase, methylenetetrahydrofolate dehydrogenase, cyclohydrolase and formyltetrahydrofolate synthetase 1, CIMAH
- External IDs: OMIM: 172460; MGI: 1342005; GeneCards: MTHFD1
Available structures
| PDB | Ortholog search: PDBe RCSB |
| PDB | List of PDB id codes 1A4I, 1DIA, 1DIB, 1DIG |
Enzyme activity
| EC # | BRENDA | ExPASy | KEGG | MetaCyc |
|---|---|---|---|---|
| 1.5.1.5 | ↗ | ↗ | ↗ | ↗ |
| 3.5.4.9 | ↗ | ↗ | ↗ | ↗ |
| 6.3.4.3 | ↗ | ↗ | ↗ | ↗ |

Gene location (Mouse)
| Chr. | Chromosome 12 (mouse) |
| Band | 12|12 C3 | Start | 76,302,072 bp |
| Band | 12|12 C3 | End | 76,366,577 bp |
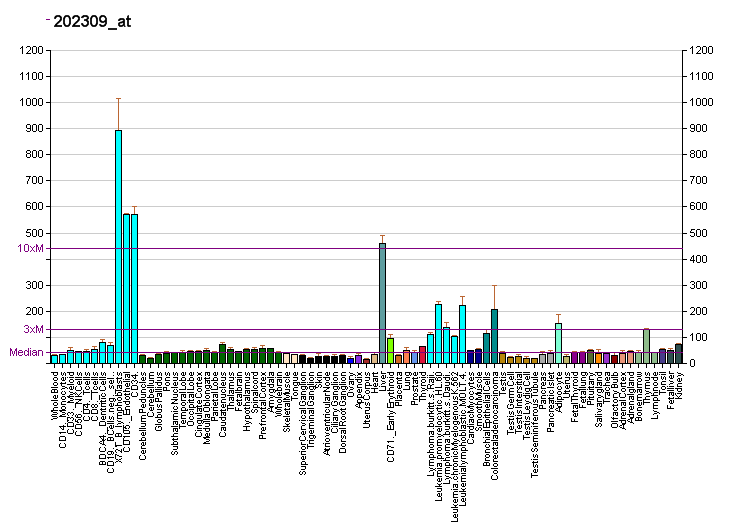
RNA expression pattern
| Bgee | Human / Mouse (ortholog); Top expressed in: right lobe of liver; gastrocnemius muscle; Achilles tendon; adipose tissue; ganglionic eminence; subcutaneous adipose tissue; caudate nucleus; nucleus accumbens; right coronary artery; kidney / Top expressed in: Paneth cell; primitive streak; right lobe of liver; left lobe of liver; right kidney; epiblast; Epithelium of choroid plexus; human kidney; left lung; right lung lobe; More reference expression data |
| BioGPS | More reference expression data |
Gene ontology
| Molecular function | nucleotide binding; methylenetetrahydrofolate dehydrogenase (NADP+) activity; methylenetetrahydrofolate dehydrogenase (NAD+) activity; ligase activity; methylenetetrahydrofolate dehydrogenase [NAD(P)+ activity]; catalytic activity; oxidoreductase activity; ATP binding; hydrolase activity; protein binding; formate-tetrahydrofolate ligase activity; methenyltetrahydrofolate cyclohydrolase activity |
| Cellular component | membrane; mitochondrion; extracellular exosome; cytoplasm; cytosol |
| Biological process | purine nucleotide biosynthetic process; transsulfuration; neutrophil homeostasis; one-carbon metabolic process; serine family amino acid metabolic process; embryonic neurocranium morphogenesis; tetrahydrofolate interconversion; histidine biosynthetic process; cellular amino acid biosynthetic process; somite development; serine family amino acid biosynthetic process; methionine biosynthetic process; development of the heart; methionine metabolic process; neural tube closure; folic acid metabolic process; embryonic viscerocranium morphogenesis; metabolism; purine nucleobase biosynthetic process; 10-formyltetrahydrofolate biosynthetic process |
Sources:Amigo / QuickGO
Orthologs
| Databases | NCBI: entry |
| Species | Human | Mouse |
| Entrez | 4522 | 108156 |
| Ensembl | n/a | ENSMUSG00000021048 |
| UniProt | P11586 | Q922D8 |
| RefSeq (mRNA) | NM_005956; NM_001364837 | NM_138745 |
| RefSeq (protein) | NP_005947; NP_001351766 | NP_620084 |
| Location (UCSC) | n/a | Chr 12: 76.3 – 76.37 Mb |
| PubMed search |
- Wikidata
| View/Edit Human | View/Edit Mouse |

Methylenetetrahydrofolate dehydrogenase, cyclohydrolase and formyltetrahydrofolate synthetase 1 (MTHFD1) is a gene located in humans on chromosome 14 that encodes a protein, C-1-tetrahydrofolate synthase, cytoplasmic also known as C1-THF synthase, with three distinct enzymatic activities.

== Function ==
This gene encodes a protein that possesses three distinct enzymatic activities, methylenetetrahydrofolate dehydrogenase (1.5.1.5), methenyltetrahydrofolate cyclohydrolase (3.5.4.9) and formate–tetrahydrofolate ligase (6.3.4.3). Each of these activities catalyzes one of three sequential reactions in the interconversion of 1-carbon derivatives of tetrahydrofolate, which are substrates for methionine, thymidylate, and de novo purine syntheses. The trifunctional enzymatic activities are conferred by two major domains, an aminoterminal portion containing the dehydrogenase and cyclohydrolase activities and a larger synthetase domain.

== Clinical significance ==
Mutations of the MTHFD1 gene may cause methylenetetrahydrofolate dehydrogenase 1 deficiency, also known as combined immunodeficiency and megaloblastic anemia with or without hyperhomocysteinemia (CIMAH).
