= Thy1 =

Thy1 may refer to:

- CD90, formal name of Thymocyte antigen 1, a cluster of differentiation 90
- Thymidylate synthase (FAD), an enzyme
- Thymidylate synthase complementing protein 1 which complements but shows no homology to thymidylate synthase
