= Methylenetetrahydrofolate dehydrogenase 1 deficiency =

Genetic disease

Methylenetetrahydrofolate dehydrogenase 1 deficiency (MTHFD1 deficiency) is a disease resulting from mutations of the MTHFD1 gene. Patients with this disease may have hemolytic uremic syndrome, macrocytosis, epilepsy, hearing loss, retinopathy, mild intellectual disability, lymphocytopenia (involving all subsets) and low T-cell receptor excision circles.

== History ==
The disease was first described by Watkins et al. in 2011.

== Alternative names ==
- Combined immunodeficiency and megaloblastic anemia with or without hyperhomocysteinemia (CIMAH)
