= Glutamate formimidoyltransferase =

Formiminotransferase domain, N-terminal subdomain
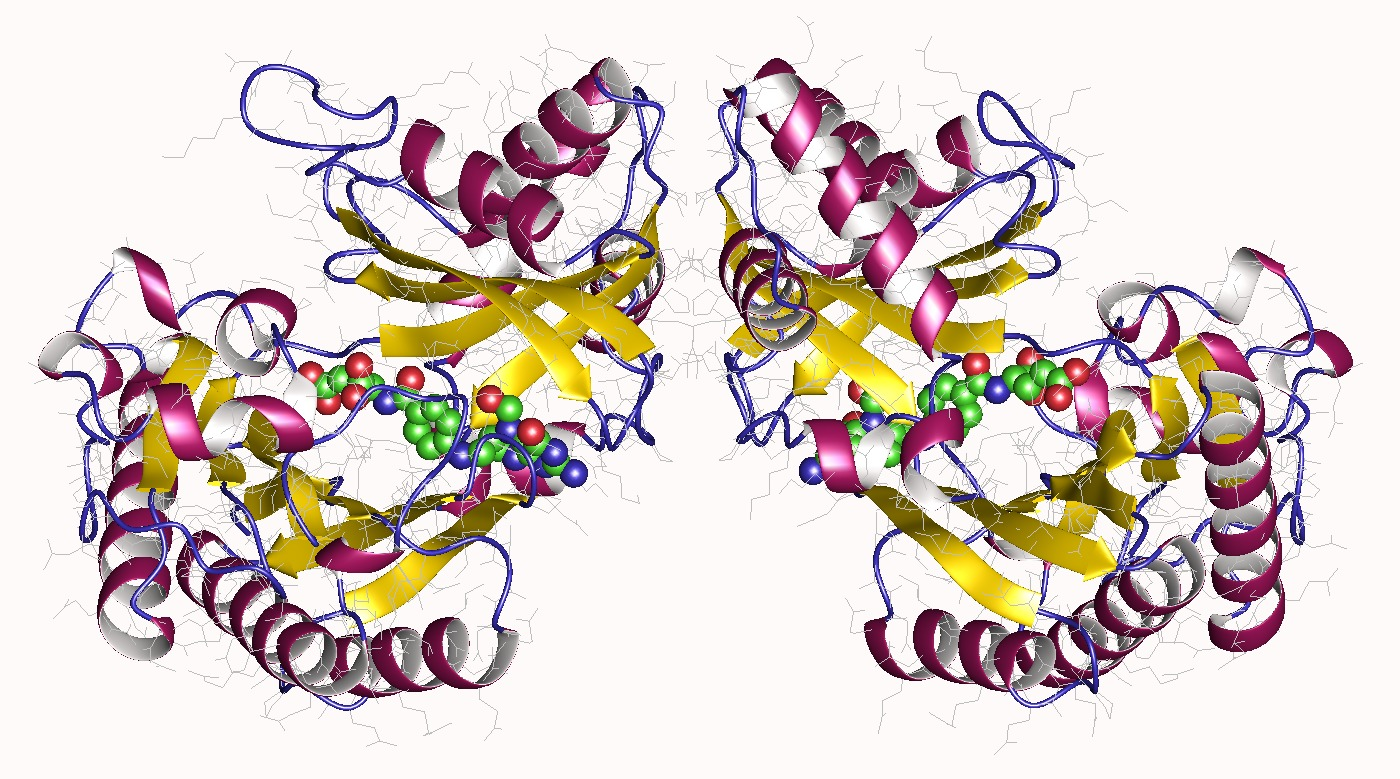
- Formiminotransferase domain of formiminotransferase-cyclodeaminase, homodimer, Sus scrofa

Identifiers
- Symbol: FTCD_N
- Pfam: PF07837
- InterPro: IPR012886
- SCOP2: 1qd1 / SCOPe / SUPFAM
Available protein structures:
- PDB: IPR012886 PF07837 (ECOD; PDBsum)
- AlphaFold: IPR012886; PF07837

Formiminotransferase domain
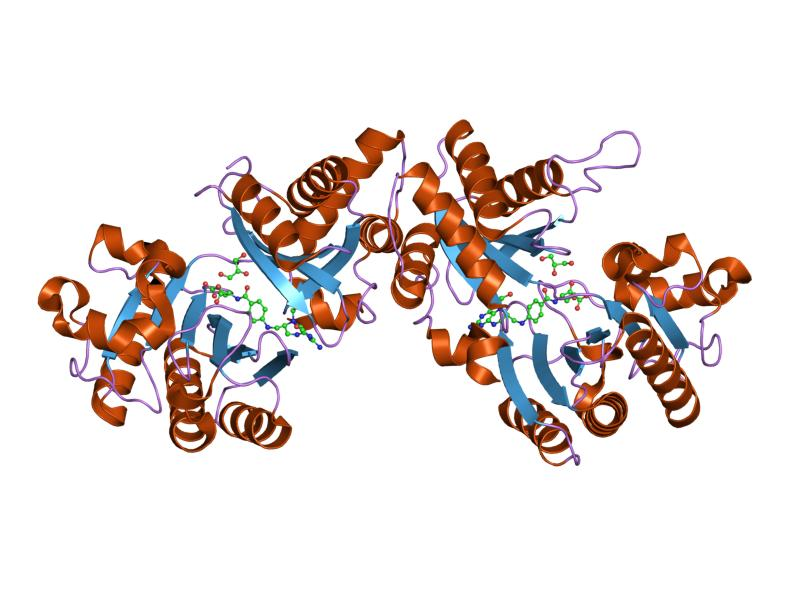
- the crystal structure of the formiminotransferase domain of formiminotransferase-cyclodeaminase.

Identifiers
- Symbol: FTCD
- Pfam: PF02971
- InterPro: IPR013802
- SCOP2: 1qd1 / SCOPe / SUPFAM
Available protein structures:
- PDB: IPR013802 PF02971 (ECOD; PDBsum)
- AlphaFold: IPR013802; PF02971

Glutamate formimidoyltransferase is a methyltransferase enzyme which is part of histidine catabolism. It catalyses two reactions. In the first, N-formimidoyl-L-glutamate (from histidine) transfers its formimidoyl group to the cofactor, tetrahydrofolic acid (THFA).

formiminoglutamic acid
+ THFA
glutamic acid
+
5-formiminotetrahydrofolate

Alternatively, the enzyme can catalyse the transfer of a formyl group from N-formyl-L-glutamic acid.

formylglutamic acid
+ THFA
glutamic acid +
folinic acid

It is classified under EC 2.1.2.5 and in mammals is found as part of a bifunctional enzyme that also has formimidoyltetrahydrofolate cyclodeaminase activity.

== Structure ==
The formiminotransferase (FT) domain of formiminotransferase-cyclodeaminase (FTCD) forms a homodimer, with each protomer comprising two subdomains. The formiminotransferase domain has an N-terminal subdomain that is made up of a six-stranded mixed beta-pleated sheet and five alpha helices, which are arranged on the external surface of the beta sheet. This, in turn, faces the beta-sheet of the C-terminal subdomain to form a double beta-sheet layer. The two subdomains are separated by a short linker sequence, which is not thought to be any more flexible than the remainder of the molecule. The substrate is predicted to form a number of contacts with residues found in both the N-terminal and C-terminal subdomains. In humans, deficiency of this enzyme results in a disease phenotype.
