= 5-Formiminotetrahydrofolate =

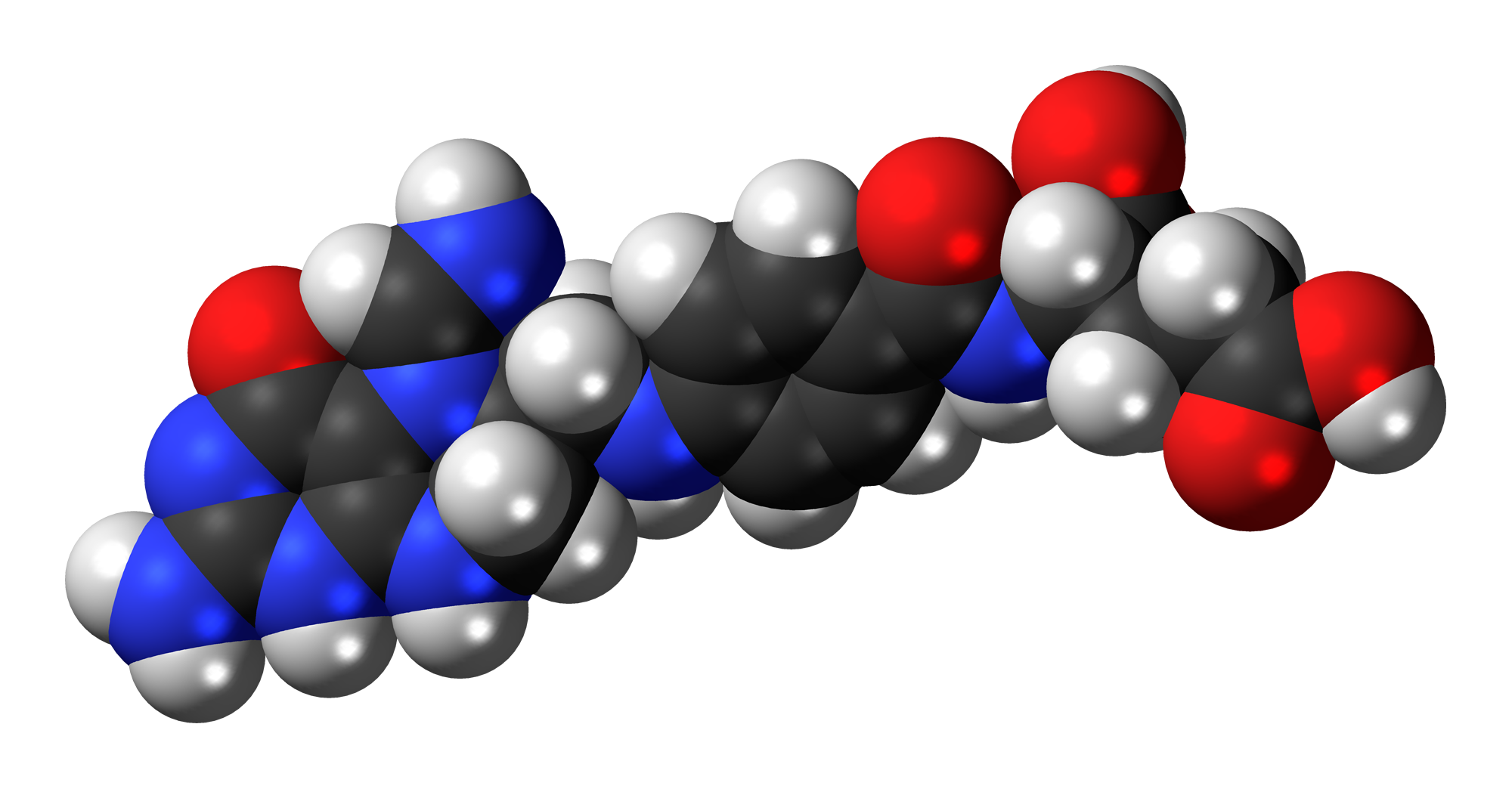

Names
- IUPAC name (2S)-2-{[4-[(2-Amino-5-methanimidoyl-4-oxo-1,6,7,8-tetrahydropteridin-6-yl)methylamino]benzoyl]amino}pentanedioic acid

Identifiers
| CAS Number | 2311-81-1 |
| 3D model (JSmol) | Interactive image |
| ChemSpider | 21232465 |
| KEGG | C00664 |
| PubChem CID | 530 |
- InChI: InChI=1S/C20H24N8O6/c21-9-28-12(8-24-16-15(28)18(32)27-20(22)26-16)7-23-11-3-1-10(2-4-11)17(31)25-13(19(33)34)5-6-14(29)30/h1-4,9,12-13,21,23H,5-8H2,(H,25,31)(H,29,30)(H,33,34)(H4,22,24,26,27,32)/p-2 Key: YCWUVLPMLLBDCU-UHFFFAOYSA-L
- SMILES: c1cc(ccc1C(=O)NC(CCC(=O)[O-])C(=O)[O-])NCC2CNc3c(c(=O)[nH]c(n3)N)N2C=N

Properties
| Chemical formula | C_{20}H_{24}N_{8}O_{6} |
| Molar mass | 472.455 |
- Except where otherwise noted, data are given for materials in their standard state (at 25 °C [77 °F], 100 kPa). Infobox references

5-Formiminotetrahydrofolate is an intermediate in the catabolism of histidine. It is produced by glutamate formimidoyltransferase and then converted into 5,10-methenyltetrahydrofolate by formiminotransferase cyclodeaminase.
