= Methenyltetrahydrofolate cyclohydrolase =

Class of enzymes

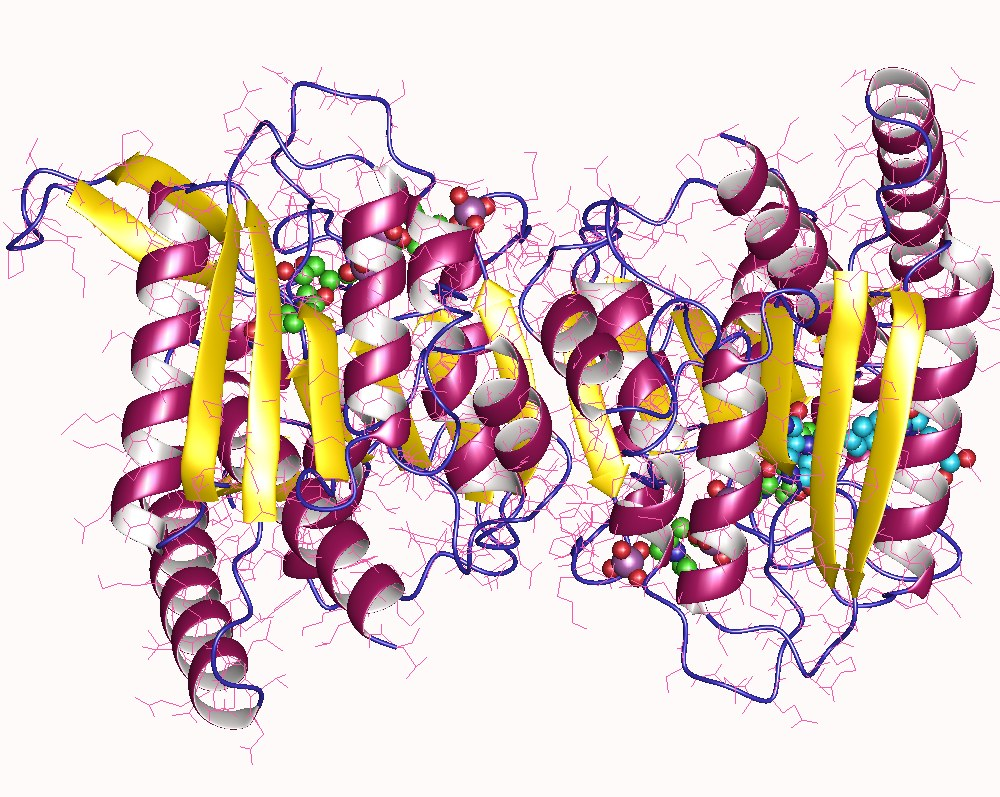
- Methenyltetrahydrofolate cyclohydrolase dimer, Human

Identifiers
- EC no.: 3.5.4.9
- CAS no.: 9027-97-8

Databases
- BRENDA: enzyme data
- ExPASy: NiceZyme view
- KEGG: enzyme entry
- MetaCyc: metabolic pathway
- Rhea: reactions
- PDB structures: RCSB PDB PDBe PDBsum
- Gene Ontology: AmiGO / QuickGO
Search
- PMC: articles
- PubMed: articles
- NCBI: proteins

Methenyltetrahydrofolate cyclohydrolase (EC 3.5.4.9) is an enzyme characterised from liver that catalyzes the chemical reaction:

5,10-methenyltetrahydrofolate
H_{2}O
10-formyltetrahydrofolic acid

The reaction is part of the degradation of the amino acid histidine via formiminoglutamic acid and recycles the 5,10-methenyltetrahydrofolate byproduct of formimidoyltetrahydrofolate cyclodeaminase. Methenyltetrahydrofolate cyclohydrolase is one of many enzymes involved in folate metabolism, and has been studied as a way to assimilate formic acid into organic compounds and hence to turn carbon dioxide into useful products.

== Structural studies ==
As of late 2007, 6 structures have been solved for this class of enzymes, with PDB accession codes PDB: 1A4I, PDB: 1DIA, PDB: 1DIB, PDB: 1DIG, PDB: 2C2X, and PDB: 2C2Y.

== Nomenclature ==
This enzyme is a hydrolases, those acting on carbon-nitrogen bonds other than peptide bonds, specifically in cyclic amidines. The systematic name of this enzyme class is 5,10-methenyltetrahydrofolate 5-hydrolase (decyclizing).

Other names in use include:

- Citrovorum factor cyclodehydrase
- cyclohydrolase
- formyl-methenyl-methylenetetrahydrofolate synthetase (combined).
