= 5,10-Methenyltetrahydrofolate =

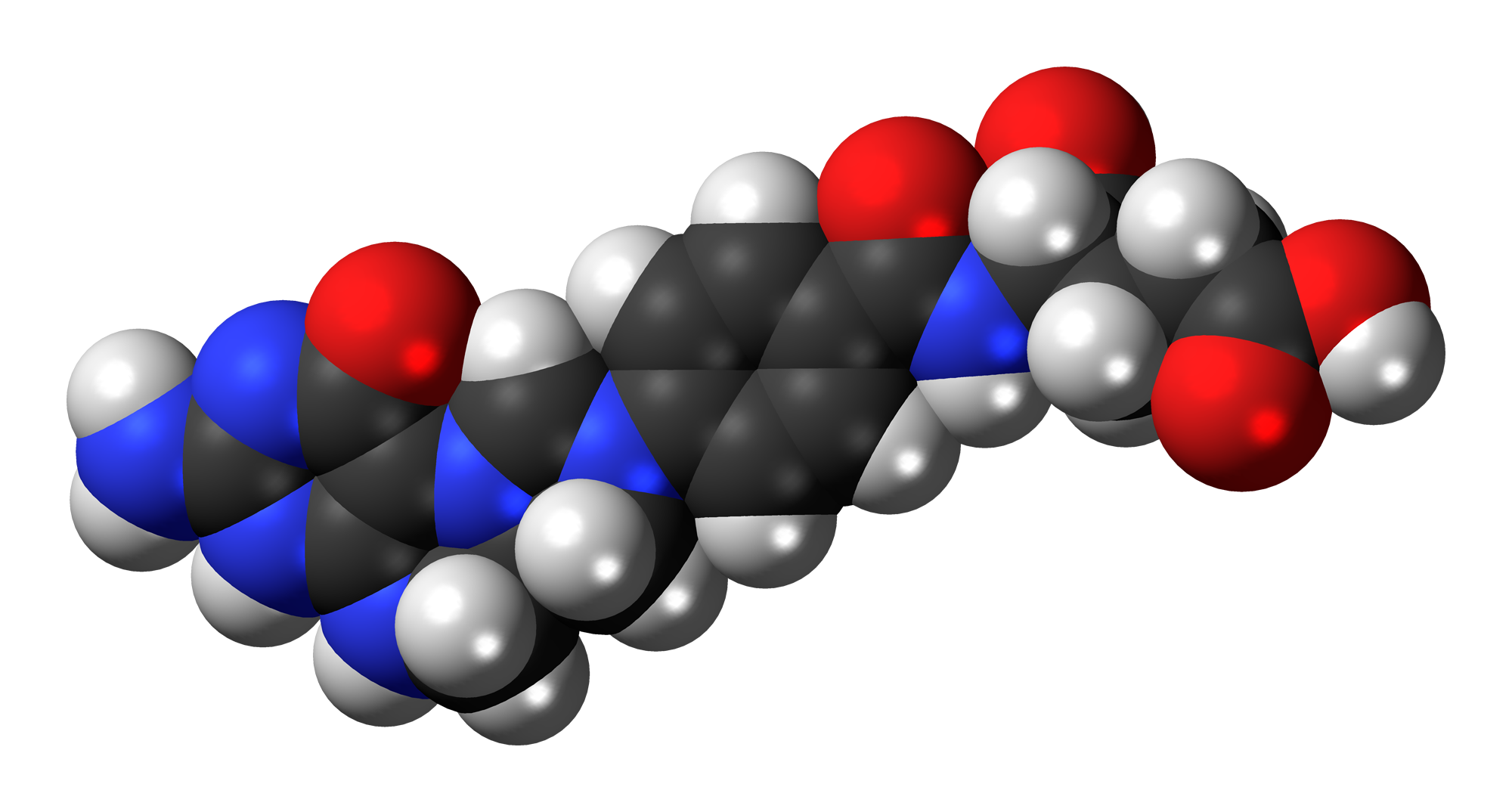

Names
- IUPAC name N-[4-(3-amino-1-oxo-1,4,5,6,6a,7-hexahydro-8H-imidazo[1,5-f]pteridin-10-ium-8-yl)benzoyl]-L-glutamic acid
- Other names 5,10-CH=THF

Identifiers
CAS Number	7444-29-3
3D model (JSmol)	Interactive image
ChEMBL	ChEMBL46521
ChemSpider	133
MeSH	5,10-methenyltetrahydrofolate
PubChem CID	644350
CompTox Dashboard (EPA)	DTXSID80995960
- InChI: InChI=1S/C20H21N7O6/c21-20-24-16-15(18(31)25-20)27-9-26(8-12(27)7-22-16)11-3-1-10(2-4-11)17(30)23-13(19(32)33)5-6-14(28)29/h1-4,9,12-13H,5-8H2,(H6-,21,22,23,24,25,28,29,30,31,32,33)/p+1 Key: MEANFMOQMXYMCT-UHFFFAOYSA-O; InChI=1/C20H21N7O6/c21-20-24-16-15(18(31)25-20)27-9-26(8-12(27)7-22-16)11-3-1-10(2-4-11)17(30)23-13(19(32)33)5-6-14(28)29/h1-4,9,12-13H,5-8H2,(H6-,21,22,23,24,25,28,29,30,31,32,33)/p+1 Key: MEANFMOQMXYMCT-IKLDFBCSAN
- SMILES: O=C(O)C(NC(=O)c1ccc(cc1)N4/C=[N+]3/C2=C(/N\C(=N/C2=O)N)NCC3C4)CCC(=O)O

Properties
Chemical formula	C_{20}H_{21}N_{7}O_{6}
Molar mass	455.42 g/mol
- Except where otherwise noted, data are given for materials in their standard state (at 25 °C [77 °F], 100 kPa). verify (what is ?) Infobox references

5,10-Methenyltetrahydrofolate (5,10-CH=THF) is a form of tetrahydrofolate that is an intermediate in metabolism. 5,10-CH=THF is a coenzyme that accepts and donates methenyl (CH=) groups.

It is produced from 5,10-methylenetetrahydrofolate by either a NAD+ dependent methylenetetrahydrofolate dehydrogenase, or a NADP+ dependent dehydrogenase. It can also be produced as an intermediate in histidine catabolism, by formiminotransferase cyclodeaminase, from 5-formiminotetrahydrofolate.

5,10-CH=THF is a substrate for methenyltetrahydrofolate cyclohydrolase, which converts it into 10-formyltetrahydrofolate.

== Interactive pathway map ==
Click on genes, proteins and metabolites below to link to respective articles. (Note: The interactive pathway map can be edited at WikiPathways: "FluoropyrimidineActivity_WP1601".)

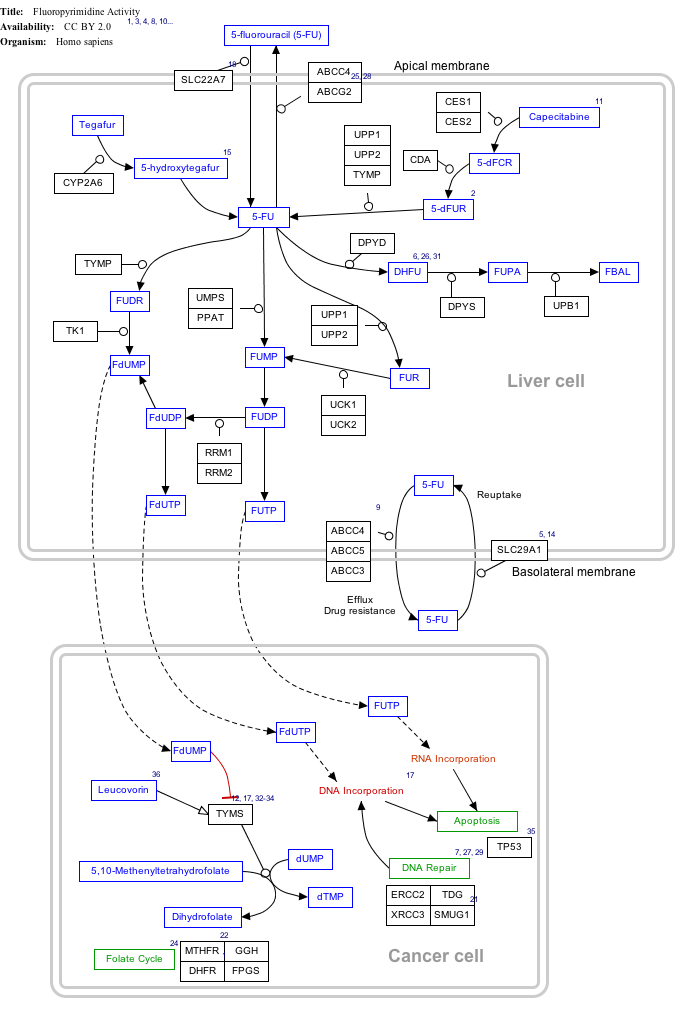

Fluorouracil (5-FU) Activity edit
