= Folate =

Vitamin

Folic acid

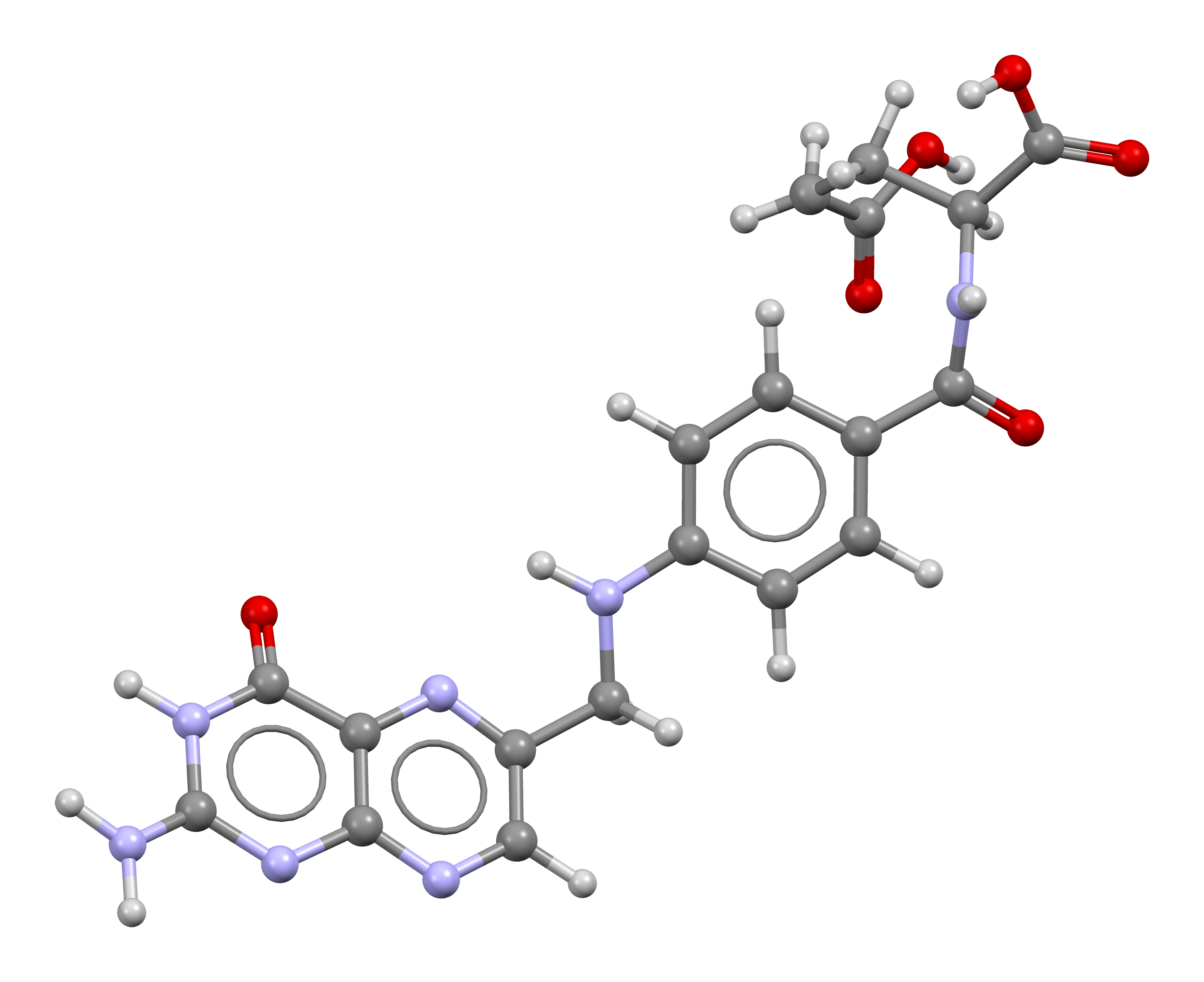

Clinical data
- Pronunciation: /ˈfoʊlɪk, ˈfɒlɪk/
- Trade names: Folicet, Folvite
- Other names: Wills factor, FA, N-(4-{[(2-amino-4-oxo-1,4-dihydropteridin-6-yl)methyl]amino}benzoyl)-L-glutamic acid, pteroyl-L-glutamic acid (PteGlu), folacin, vitamin B_{9}; formerly, vitamin B_{c} and vitamin M
- AHFS/Drugs.com: Monograph
- MedlinePlus: a682591
- License data: US DailyMed: Folic acid
- Pregnancy category: AU: A
- Routes of administration: By mouth, intramuscular, intravenous, subcutaneous
- ATC code: B03BB01 (WHO) V04CX02 (WHO) B03AE02 (WHO) B03AE01 (WHO) B03BB51 (WHO)

Legal status
- Legal status: AU: S4 (Prescription only) / S2; US: ℞-only / OTC

Pharmacokinetic data
- Bioavailability: 50–100%
- Metabolism: Liver
- Excretion: Urine

Identifiers
- IUPAC name: (2S)-2-[[4-[(2-Amino-4-oxo-1H-pteridin-6-yl)methylamino]benzoyl]amino]pentanedioic acid
- CAS Number: 59-30-3; as salt: 6484-89-5
- PubChem CID: 6037
- IUPHAR/BPS: 4563
- DrugBank: DB00158; as salt: DBSALT001918
- ChemSpider: 5815; as salt: 21512
- UNII: 935E97BOY8; as salt: 9P9W8GGU78
- KEGG: D00070; as salt: D07985
- ChEBI: CHEBI:27470
- ChEMBL: ChEMBL1622
- PDB ligand: FOL (PDBe, RCSB PDB)

Chemical and physical data
- Formula: C_{19}H_{19}N_{7}O_{6}
- Molar mass: 441.404 g·mol^{−1}
- 3D model (JSmol): Interactive image
- Density: 1.6±0.1 g/cm^{3}
- Melting point: 250 °C (482 °F) (decomposition)
- Solubility in water: 1.6mg/L (25 °C)
- SMILES: n1c2C(=O)NC(N)=Nc2ncc1CNc3ccc(cc3)C(=O)N[C@H](C(O)=O)CCC(O)=O
- InChI: InChI=1S/C19H19N7O6/c20-19-25-15-14(17(30)26-19)23-11(8-22-15)7-21-10-3-1-9(2-4-10)16(29)24-12(18(31)32)5-6-13(27)28/h1-4,8,12,21H,5-7H2,(H,24,29)(H,27,28)(H,31,32)(H3,20,22,25,26,30)/t12-/m0/s1; Key:OVBPIULPVIDEAO-LBPRGKRZSA-N

Folate, also known as vitamin B_{9} and folacin, is one of the B vitamins. Folate is required for the body to make DNA and RNA and metabolize amino acids necessary for cell division and maturation of blood cells. As the human body cannot make folate, it is required in the diet, making it an essential nutrient. It occurs naturally in many foods. The recommended adult daily intake of folate in the U.S. is 400 micrograms from foods or dietary supplements. Manufactured folic acid, which is converted into folate by the body, is used as a dietary supplement and in food fortification as it is more stable during processing and storage.

Folate in the form of folic acid is used to treat anemia caused by folate deficiency. Folic acid is also used as a supplement by women during pregnancy to reduce the risk of neural tube defects (NTDs) in the baby. NTDs include anencephaly and spina bifida, among other defects. Low levels in early pregnancy are believed to be the cause of more than half of babies born with NTDs. More than 80 countries use either mandatory or voluntary fortification of certain foods with folic acid as a measure to decrease the rate of NTDs. Long-term supplementation with relatively large amounts of folic acid is associated with a small reduction in the risk of stroke and, for "relatively large amount" meaning ≥ 400 μg/day, an increased risk of prostate cancer.

Not consuming enough folate can lead to folate deficiency. This may result in a type of anemia in which red blood cells become abnormally large. Symptoms may include feeling tired, heart palpitations, shortness of breath, open sores on the tongue, and changes in the color of the skin or hair. Folate deficiency in children may develop within a month of poor dietary intake. In adults, normal total body folate is between 10 and 30 mg with about half of this amount stored in the liver and the remainder in blood and body tissues. In plasma, the natural folate range is 150 to 450 nM.

Folate was discovered between 1931 and 1943. It is on the World Health Organization's List of Essential Medicines. In 2023, it was the 94th most commonly prescribed medication in the United States, with more than 7 million prescriptions. The term "folic" is from the Latin word folium (which means leaf) because it was found in dark-green leafy vegetables.

== Definition ==
Chemical structure of the folate family

Folates (vitamin B_{9}) refers to the many forms of folic acid and its related compounds, including tetrahydrofolic acid (an active form), methyltetrahydrofolate (the primary form found in blood), methenyltetrahydrofolate, folinic acid, and other pteroylglutates. Historic names included L. casei factor, folacin, vitamin B_{c} and vitamin M.

The terms folate, folates, and folic acid have somewhat different meanings in different contexts, although sometimes used interchangeably. Within the field of organic chemistry and biochemistry, folate (singular) refers to the conjugate base of folic acid; folates (plural) refers to the family of compounds related to and including folic acid (pteroylglutamates), possibly differing in the level of reduction (see below) on the pterin ring and the number of glutamyl units. An alternative biochemical definition also requires biological activity for a compound to belong to the folates. Within the field of nutrition, the terms are often used interchangeably. When and if a distinction is made, folate refers to the natural forms where as folic acid refers to the specific manufactured form that is used as a dietary supplement.

Chemically, folates consist of three distinct chemical moieties linked together. A pterin (2-amino-4-hydroxy-pteridine) heterocyclic ring is linked by a methylene bridge to a p-aminobenzoyl group (these two make up a "pteroate") that in turn is bonded through an amide linkage to either glutamic acid or poly-glutamate. The pterin ring can be in three levels of reduction: no hydrogens (as in folic acid), two hydrogens (as in dihydrofolate), or the active form of four hydrogens (as in tetrahydrofolate and other active forms). In living organisms, one-carbon units in a variety of oxidation states may be attached to the N^{5} nitrogen atom of the pteridine ring and/or the N^{10} nitrogen atom of the p-aminobenzoyl group of tetrahydrofolate. Most folates are unstable to oxidation, with the exception of folic acid and folinic acid.

== Function ==
Tetrahydrofolate's main function in metabolism is transporting single-carbon groups (i.e., a methyl group, methylene group, or formyl group). These carbon groups can be transferred to other molecules as part of the modification or biosynthesis of a variety of biological molecules. Folates are essential for the synthesis of DNA, the modification of DNA and RNA, the synthesis of methionine from homocysteine, and various other chemical reactions involved in cellular metabolism. These reactions are collectively known as folate-mediated one-carbon metabolism.

=== DNA synthesis ===
Folate derivatives participate in the biosynthesis of both purines and pyrimidines, which leads to the building blocks of DNA and RNA.

Formyl folate is required for two of the steps in the biosynthesis of inosine monophosphate, the precursor to GMP and AMP. Methylenetetrahydrofolate donates the C1 center required for the biosynthesis of dTMP (2′-deoxythymidine-5′-phosphate) from dUMP (2′-deoxyuridine-5′-phosphate). The conversion is catalyzed by thymidylate synthase.

=== Vitamin B_{12} activation ===
Simplified schematic diagram of the folate methionine cycle

Methyl-THF converts vitamin B_{12} to methyl-B_{12} (methylcobalamin). Methyl-B_{12} converts homocysteine, in a reaction catalyzed by homocysteine methyltransferase, to methionine. A defect in homocysteine methyltransferase or a deficiency of B_{12} may lead to a so-called "methyl-trap" of THF, in which THF converts to methyl-THF, causing a deficiency in folate. Thus, a deficiency in B_{12} can cause accumulation of methyl-THF, mimicking folate deficiency.

== Health effects ==
Folate is especially important during periods of frequent cell division and growth, such as infancy and pregnancy. Folate deficiency hinders DNA synthesis and cell division, affecting hematopoietic cells and neoplasms the most because of their greater frequency of cell division. RNA transcription and subsequent protein synthesis are less affected by folate deficiency, as the mRNA can be recycled and used again (as opposed to DNA synthesis, where a new genomic copy must be created).

=== Birth defects ===
Deficiency of folate in pregnant women has been implicated in neural tube defects (NTDs), with an estimate of 300,000 cases worldwide prior to the implementation in many countries of mandatory food fortification. NTDs occur early in pregnancy (first month), therefore women must have abundant folate upon conception and for this reason there is a recommendation that any woman planning to become pregnant consume a folate-containing dietary supplement before and during pregnancy. The Center for Disease Control and Prevention (CDC) recommends a daily amount of 400 micrograms of folic acid for the prevention of NTDs. Many women take this medication less than the CDC recommends, especially in cases where the pregnancy was unplanned, or in countries that lack healthcare resources and education. Some countries have implemented either mandatory or voluntary food fortification of wheat flour and other grains, but many others rely on public health education and one-on-one healthcare practitioner advice. A meta-analysis of global birth prevalence of spina bifida showed that when a national, mandatory program to fortify the diet with folate was compared to countries without such a fortification program, there was a 30% reduction in live births with spina bifida. Some countries reported a greater than 50% reduction. The United States Preventive Services Task Force recommends folic acid as the supplement or fortification ingredient, as forms of folate other than folic acid have not been studied.

A meta-analysis of folate supplementation during pregnancy reported a 28% lower relative risk of newborn congenital heart defects. Prenatal supplementation with folic acid did not appear to reduce the risk of preterm births. One systematic review indicated no effect of folic acid on mortality, growth, body composition, respiratory, or cognitive outcomes of children from birth to 9 years old. There was no relation between maternal folic acid supplementation and an increased risk for childhood asthma.

=== Fertility ===
Folate contributes to spermatogenesis. In women, folate is important for oocyte quality and maturation, implantation, placentation, fetal growth and organ development.

=== Heart disease ===
One meta-analysis reported that multi-year folic acid supplementation, in amounts in most of the included clinical trials at higher than the upper limit of 1,000 μg/day, reduced the relative risk of cardiovascular disease by a modest 4%. Two older meta-analyses, which would not have incorporated results from newer clinical trials, reported no changes to the risk of cardiovascular disease.

=== Stroke ===
The absolute risk of stroke with supplementation decreases from 4.4% to 3.8% (a 10% decrease in relative risk). Two other meta-analyses reported a similar decrease in relative risk. Two of these three were limited to people with pre-existing cardiovascular disease or coronary heart disease. The beneficial result may be associated with lowering circulating homocysteine concentration, as stratified analysis showed that risk was reduced more when there was a larger decrease in homocysteine. The effect was also larger for the studies that were conducted in countries that did not have mandatory grain folic acid fortification. The beneficial effect was larger in the subset of trials that used a lower folic acid supplement compared to higher.

=== Cancer ===
Chronically insufficient intake of folate may increase the risk of colorectal, breast, ovarian, pancreatic, brain, lung, cervical, prostate, oesophageal, oral and pharyngeal cancers.

Higher intake of folate from foods has been associated with reducing the adverse effects of alcohol on breast cancer risk.

Due to the risks associated with folate deficiency, folic acid fortification of foods was initiated. Shortly after folic acid fortification was introduced, concerns were raised that higher intake might promote the progression of preneoplastic lesions in the colon (early cellular changes that could become cancer).

Subsequent meta-analyses of the effects of low versus high dietary folate, elevated serum folate, and folic acid supplementation have reported conflicting results. One study that compared low to high dietary folate showed a modest but statistically significant reduction in colon cancer risk.

- Another study that also compared low to high dietary folate showed no effect on the risk for prostate cancer, . In contrast, a review of trials involving folic acid dietary supplements reported a statistically significant 24% increase in prostate cancer risk. Supplementation in these trials typically used 1,000 to 2,500 μg/day of folic acid—higher than what is achieved through diets rich in naturally occurring folate. Another supplementation review reported no significant increase or decrease in total cancer incidence, colorectal cancer, other gastrointestinal cancer, genitourinary cancer, lung cancer or hematological malignancies among people who consumed folic acid supplements. Another supplementation meta-analysis limited to colorectal cancer showed that folic acid supplementation was not associated with colorectal cancer risk.

Taken together, the evidence indicates that higher dietary folate intake may be associated with reduced colorectal cancer risk, while results for high-dose folic acid supplementation are inconsistent — with some studies showing no effect and others reporting a possible increased risk for prostate cancer — suggesting that effects may vary by cancer type.

==== Anti-folate chemotherapy ====
Folate is important for cells and tissues that divide rapidly. Cancer cells divide rapidly, and drugs that interfere with folate metabolism are used to treat cancer. The antifolate drug methotrexate is often used to treat cancer because it inhibits the production of the active tetrahydrofolate (THF) from the inactive dihydrofolate (DHF). However, methotrexate can be toxic, producing side effects such as inflammation in the digestive tract that make eating normally more difficult. Bone marrow depression (inducing leukopenia and thrombocytopenia) and acute kidney and liver failure have been reported.

Folinic acid, under the drug name leucovorin, a form of folate (formyl-THF), can help "rescue" or reverse the toxic effects of methotrexate. Folic acid supplements have little established role in cancer chemotherapy. The supplement of folinic acid in people undergoing methotrexate treatment is to give less rapidly dividing cells enough folate to maintain normal cell functions. The amount of folate given is quickly depleted by rapidly dividing (cancer) cells, so this does not negate the effects of methotrexate.

=== Neurological disorders ===
Conversion of homocysteine to methionine requires folate and vitamin B_{12}. Elevated plasma homocysteine and low folate are associated with cognitive impairment, dementia and Alzheimer's disease. Supplementing the diet with folic acid and vitamin B_{12} lowers plasma homocysteine. However, several reviews reported that supplementation with folic acid alone or in combination with other B vitamins did not prevent development of cognitive impairment nor slow cognitive decline.

Maternal folic acid supplementation during pregnancy is associated with a reduced risk of autism in children across Asian, European, and American populations. Cerebral folate deficiency, often caused by folate receptor alpha autoantibodies, is common in autism. Treatment with folinic acid appears to be safe, and one meta review found that, in children, it may produce a minor-to-significant improvement in symptoms stereotypically associated with ASD.

=== Psychiatric disorders ===
Some evidence links a shortage of folate with clinical depression. A 2024 umbrella meta-analysis concluded that folate supplementation alleviates depression symptoms, while folate deficiency is associated with an increased risk of depression, suggesting folate as a beneficial adjunctive treatment in managing depression. Other research also found a link between depression and low levels of folate. The exact mechanisms involved in the development of schizophrenia and depression are not entirely clear, but the bioactive folate, methyltetrahydrofolate (5-MTHF), a direct target of methyl donors such as S-adenosyl methionine (SAMe), recycles the inactive dihydrobiopterin (BH_{2}) into tetrahydrobiopterin (BH_{4}), the necessary cofactor in various steps of monoamine synthesis, including that of dopamine and serotonin. BH_{4} serves a regulatory role in monoamine neurotransmission and is required to mediate the actions of most antidepressants. Oral 5-MTHF has also shown evidence of efficacy in depression, both as monotherapy and as an adjunct to antidepressant therapy.

=== Folic acid, b_{12} and iron ===
A complex interaction occurs between folic acid, vitamin B_{12}, and iron. A deficiency of folic acid or vitamin B_{12} may mask the deficiency of iron; so when taken as dietary supplements, the three need to be in balance. Additionally, folic acid in combination with vitamin B_{12} was associated with improvement in patients with recurrent aphthous stomatitis.

=== Malaria ===
Some studies show iron–folic acid supplementation in children under five may result in increased mortality due to malaria; this has prompted the World Health Organization to alter their iron–folic acid supplementation policies for children in malaria-prone areas, such as India.

== Absorption, metabolism and excretion ==
Folate in food is roughly one-third in the form of monoglutamate and two-thirds polyglutamate; the latter is hydrolyzed to monoglutamate via a reaction mediated by folate conjugase at the brush border of enterocytes in the proximal small intestine. The majority is in the fully reduced (tetrahydro) form. Subsequently, intestinal absorption is primarily accomplished by the action of the proton-coupled folate transporter (PCFT) protein coded for by the SLC46A1 gene. This functions best at pH 5.5, which corresponds to the acidic status of the proximal small intestine. PCFT binds to both reduced folates and folic acid. A secondary folate transporter is the reduced folate carrier (RFC), coded for by the SLC19A1 gene. It operates optimally at pH 7.4 in the ileum portion of the small intestine. It has a low affinity for folic acid. Production of the receptor proteins is increased in times of folate deficiency. In addition to a role in intestinal absorption, RFC is expressed in virtually all tissues and is the major route of delivery of folate to cells within the systemic circulation under physiological conditions. When pharmacological amounts of folate are taken as a dietary supplement, absorption also takes place by a passive diffusion-like process. In addition, bacteria in the distal portion of the small intestine and in the large intestine synthesize modest amounts of folate, and there are RFC receptors in the large intestine, so this in situ source may contribute to toward the cellular nutrition and health of the local colonocytes.

The biological activity of oxidized forms of folate, including folic acid and dihydrofolate, in the body depends upon dihydrofolate reductase action in the liver which converts them into tetrahydrofolate (THF). This action is rate-limiting in humans, leading to elevated blood concentrations of unmetabolized folic acid when consumption from dietary supplements and fortified foods nears or exceeds the U.S. Tolerable Upper Intake Level of 1,000 μg per day.

The total human body content of folate is estimated to be approximately 15–30 milligrams, with approximately half in the liver. Excretion is via urine and feces. Under normal dietary intake, urinary excretion is mainly as folate cleavage products, but if a dietary supplement is being consumed then there will be intact folate in the urine. The liver produces folate-containing bile, which if not all absorbed in the small intestine, contributes to fecal folate, intact and as cleavage products, which under normal dietary intake has been estimated to be similar in amount to urinary excretion. Fecal content includes what is synthesized by intestinal microflora.

=== Biosynthesis ===
Animals, including humans, cannot synthesize (produce) folate and therefore must obtain folate from their diets. All plants and fungi and certain protozoa, bacteria, and archaea can synthesize folate de novo through variations on the same biosynthetic pathway. The folate molecule is synthesized from pterin pyrophosphate, para-aminobenzoic acid (PABA), and glutamate through the action of dihydropteroate synthase and dihydrofolate synthase. Pterin is in turn derived in a series of enzymatically catalyzed steps from guanosine triphosphate (GTP), while PABA is a product of the shikimate pathway.

=== Bioactivation ===
Biotransformation of folic acid into folinic acids where R = para-aminobenzoate-glutamate

All of the biological functions of folic acid are performed by THF and its methylated derivatives. Hence folic acid must first be reduced to THF. This four electron reduction proceeds in two chemical steps both catalyzed by the same enzyme, dihydrofolate reductase. Folic acid is first reduced to dihydrofolate and then to tetrahydrofolate. Each step consumes one molecule of NADPH (biosynthetically derived from vitamin B_{3}) and produces one molecule of NADP. Mechanistically, hydride is transferred from NADPH to the C6 position of the pteridine ring.

A one-carbon (1C) methyl group is added to tetrahydrofolate through the action of serine hydroxymethyltransferase (SHMT) to yield 5,10-methylenetetrahydrofolate (5,10-CH_{2}-THF). This reaction also consumes serine and pyridoxal phosphate (PLP; vitamin B_{6}) and produces glycine and pyridoxal. A second enzyme, methylenetetrahydrofolate dehydrogenase (MTHFD2) oxidizes 5,10-methylenetetrahydrofolate to an iminium cation which in turn is hydrolyzed to produce 5-formyl-THF and 10-formyl-THF. This series of reactions using the β-carbon atom of serine as the carbon source provide the largest part of the one-carbon units available to the cell.

Alternative carbon sources include formate which by the catalytic action of formate–tetrahydrofolate ligase adds a 1C unit to THF to yield 10-formyl-THF. Glycine, histidine, and sarcosine can also directly contribute to the THF-bound 1C pool.

== Drug interference ==
The antifolate class of drugs target organisms by interfering with the use of folate. Most of them are dihydrofolate reductase inhibitors, blocking the production of THF from folic acid. Among them are the antimicrobial trimethoprim, the antiprotozoal pyrimethamine and the chemotherapy drug methotrexate. Unlike humans, some bacteria make their own folate using dihydropteroate synthetase, allowing them to be targeted by sulfonamides (competitive inhibitors of the PABA site).

There are also a number of drugs where the anti-folate effect is unintended. Valproic acid, one of the most commonly prescribed epilepsy treatment drugs, also used to treat certain psychological conditions such as bipolar disorder, is a known inhibitor of folic acid. As such, it has been shown to cause birth defects, including neural tube defects, plus increased risk for children having cognitive impairment and autism. There is evidence that folate consumption is protective.

Folate deficiency is common in alcoholics, attributed to both inadequate diet and an inhibition in intestinal processing of the vitamin. Chronic alcohol use inhibits both the digestion process of dietary folate polyglutamates and the uptake phase of liberated folate monoglutamates. The latter is associated with a significant reduction in the level of expression of RFC.

== Dietary recommendations ==
Because of the difference in bioavailability between supplemented folic acid and the different forms of folate found in food, the dietary folate equivalent (DFE) system was established. One DFE is defined as 1 μg of dietary folate. 1 μg of folic acid supplement counts as 1.7 μg DFE. The reason for the difference is that when folic acid is added to food or taken as a dietary supplement with food it is at least 85% absorbed, whereas only about 50% of folate naturally present in food is absorbed.

National Institutes of Health (U.S.) nutritional recommendations μg DFE per day for RDA, μg folic acid for tolerable upper intake levels (UL)
Age	Infants		Children and adults		Pregnant women		Lactating women	
Age	(AI)	(UL)	(RDA)	(UL)	(RDA)	(UL)	(RDA)	(UL)
0–6 months	65	None set	–	–	–	–	–	–
7–12 months	80	None set	–	–	–	–	–	–
1–3 years	–	–	150	300	–	–	–	–
4–8 years	–	–	200	400	–	–	–	–
9–13 years	–	–	300	600	–	–	–	–
14–18	–	–	400	800	600	800	500	800
19+	–	–	400	1000	600	1000	500	1000

The U.S. Institute of Medicine defines Estimated Average Requirements (EARs), Recommended Dietary Allowances (RDAs), Adequate Intakes (AIs), and Tolerable upper intake levels (ULs) – collectively referred to as Dietary Reference Intakes (DRIs). The European Food Safety Authority (EFSA) refers to the collective set of information as Dietary Reference Values, with Population Reference Intake (PRI) instead of RDA, and Average Requirement instead of EAR. AI and UL are defined the same as in the United States. For women and men over age 18, the PRI is set at 330 μg/day. PRI for pregnancy is 600 μg/day, for lactation 500 μg/day. For children ages 1–17 years, the PRIs increase with age from 120 to 270 μg/day. These values differ somewhat from the U.S. RDAs. The United Kingdom's Dietary Reference Value for folate, set by the Committee on Medical Aspects of Food and Nutrition Policy in 1991, is 200 μg/day for adults.

=== Safety ===
The risk of toxicity from folic acid is low because folate is a water-soluble vitamin and is regularly removed from the body through urine. One potential issue associated with high doses of folic acid is that it has a masking effect on the diagnosis of pernicious anaemia due to vitamin B_{12} deficiency, and may even precipitate or exacerbate neuropathy in vitamin B12-deficient individuals. This evidence justified development of a UL for folate. In general, ULs are set for vitamins and minerals when evidence is sufficient. The adult UL of 1,000 μg for folate (and lower for children) refers specifically to folic acid used as a supplement, as no health risks have been associated with high intake of folate from food sources. The EFSA reviewed the safety question and agreed with United States that the UL be set at 1,000 μg. The Japan National Institute of Health and Nutrition set the adult UL at 1,300 or 1,400 μg depending on age.

Reviews of clinical trials that called for long-term consumption of folic acid in amounts exceeding the UL have raised concerns. Excessive amounts derived from supplements are more of a concern than that derived from natural food sources and the relative proportion to vitamin B_{12} may be a significant factor in adverse effects. One theory is that consumption of large amounts of folic acid leads to detectable amounts of unmetabolized folic acid circulating in blood because the enzyme dihydrofolate reductase that converts folic acid to the biologically active forms is rate limiting. Evidence of a negative health effect of folic acid in blood is not consistent, and folic acid has no known cofactor function that would increase the likelihood of a causal role for free folic acid in disease development. Long-term use of folic acid dietary supplements in excess of 1,000 μg/day has been linked to an increase in prostate cancer risk.

=== Food labeling ===
For U.S. food and dietary supplement labeling purposes, the amount in a serving is expressed as a percent of Daily Value (%DV). For folate labeling purposes, 100% of the Daily Value was 400 μg. As of the 27 May 2016 update, it was kept unchanged at 400 μg. Compliance with the updated labeling regulations was required by 1 January 2020 for manufacturers with US$10 million or more in annual food sales, and by 1 January 2021 for manufacturers with lower volume food sales. A table of the old and new adult daily values is provided at Reference Daily Intake.

European Union regulations require that labels declare energy, protein, fat, saturated fat, carbohydrates, sugars, and salt. Voluntary nutrients may be shown if present in significant amounts. Instead of Daily Values, amounts are shown as percent of Reference Intakes (RIs). For folate, 100% RI was set at 200 μg in 2011.

== Deficiency ==
Folate deficiency can be caused by unhealthy diets that do not include enough vegetables and other folate-rich foods; diseases in which folates are not well absorbed in the digestive system (such as Crohn's disease or celiac disease); some genetic disorders that affect levels of folate; and certain medicines (such as phenytoin, sulfasalazine, or trimethoprim-sulfamethoxazole). Folate deficiency is accelerated by alcohol consumption, possibly by interference with folate transport.

Folate deficiency may lead to glossitis, diarrhea, depression, confusion, anemia, and fetal neural tube and brain defects. Other symptoms include fatigue, gray hair, mouth sores, poor growth, and swollen tongue. Folate deficiency is diagnosed by analyzing a complete blood count (CBC) and plasma vitamin B_{12} and folate levels. A serum folate of 3 μg/L or lower indicates deficiency. Serum folate level reflects folate status, but erythrocyte folate level better reflects tissue stores after intake. An erythrocyte folate level of 140 μg/L or lower indicates inadequate folate status. Serum folate reacts more rapidly to folate intake than erythrocyte folate.

Since folate deficiency limits cell division, erythropoiesis (production of red blood cells) is hindered. This leads to megaloblastic anemia, which is characterized by large, immature red blood cells. This pathology results from persistently thwarted attempts at normal DNA replication, DNA repair, and cell division, and produces abnormally large red cells called megaloblasts (and hypersegmented neutrophils) with abundant cytoplasm capable of RNA and protein synthesis, but with clumping and fragmentation of nuclear chromatin. Some of these large cells, although immature (reticulocytes), are released early from the marrow in an attempt to compensate for the anemia. Both adults and children need folate to make normal red and white blood cells and prevent anemia, which causes fatigue, weakness, and inability to concentrate.

Increased homocysteine levels suggest tissue folate deficiency, but homocysteine is also affected by vitamin B_{12} and vitamin B_{6}, renal function, and genetics. One way to differentiate between folate deficiency and vitamin B_{12} deficiency is by testing for methylmalonic acid (MMA) levels. Normal MMA levels indicate folate deficiency and elevated MMA levels indicate vitamin B_{12} deficiency. Elevated MMA levels may also be due to the rare metabolic disorder combined malonic and methylmalonic aciduria (CMAMMA).

Folate deficiency is treated with supplemental oral folic acid of 400 to 1000 μg per day. This treatment is very successful in replenishing tissues, even if deficiency was caused by malabsorption. People with megaloblastic anemia need to be tested for vitamin B_{12} deficiency before treatment with folic acid, because if the person has vitamin B_{12} deficiency, folic acid supplementation can remove the anemia, but can also worsen neurologic problems. Cobalamin (vitamin B_{12}) deficiency may lead to folate deficiency, which, in turn, increases homocysteine levels and may result in the development of cardiovascular disease or birth defects.

== Sources ==
The United States Department of Agriculture, Agricultural Research Service maintains a food composition database from which folate content in hundreds of foods can be searched as shown in the table. The Food Fortification Initiative lists all countries in the world that conduct fortification programs, and within each country, what nutrients are added to which foods, and whether those programs are voluntary or mandatory. In the US, mandatory fortification of enriched breads, cereals, flours, corn meal, pastas, rice, and other grain products began in January 1998. As of 2023, 140 countries require food fortification with one or more vitamins, with folate required in 69 countries. The most commonly fortified food is wheat flour, followed by maize flour and rice. From country to country, added folic acid amounts range from 0.4 to 5.1 mg/kg, but the great majority are in a more narrow range of 1.0 to 2.5 mg/kg, i.e. 100–250 μg/100g. Folate naturally found in food is susceptible to destruction from high heat cooking, especially in the presence of acidic foods and sauces. It is soluble in water, and so may be lost from foods boiled in water. For foods that are normally consumed cooked, values in the table are for folate naturally occurring in cooked foods.

Plant sources	Amount as Folate (μg / 100 g)
Peanuts	246
Sunflower seed kernels	238
Lentils	181
Chickpeas	172
Asparagus	149
Spinach	146
Lettuce	136
Peanuts (oil-roasted)	125
Soybeans	111
Broccoli	108
Walnuts	98
Peanut butter	92
Hazelnuts	88
Avocados	81
Beets	80
Kale	65
Bread (not fortified)	65
Cabbage	46
Red bell peppers	46
Cauliflower	44
Tofu	29
Potatoes	28

Animal sources	Amount as Folate (μg / 100 g)
Chicken liver	578
Calf liver	331
Cheese	20–60
Chicken eggs	44
Salmon	35
Chicken	12
Beef	12
Pork	8
Yogurt	8–11
Milk, whole	5
Butter, salted	3

Folate in food is mostly found in the fully reduced state, i.e. tetrahydrofolate (THF) and its substiuted and polyglutamated derivatives. Dihydrofolate (DHF) is rarely detected because it is too unstable to survive chemical analysis procedures (and probably storage). Fully oxizied folic acid (FA) is also present in some foods at low concentrations, produced by degreadation of THF and DHF. FA constitutes up to 25% of total folate in some fractions of cereals such as bran and whole grain flour.

THF and DHF are very unstable under storage and in water solution. They tend to go through auto-oxidation, which breaks apart the linkage between the pterin and the aminobenzoic rings. Only rarely do they oxidize into FA. The various substituted forms of THF found in food, 5-methyl-THF, 5-formyl-THF, and 10-formyl-THF, are more chemically stable in food compared to THF itself. A rich source of 5-methyl-THF is animal liver, where it is present in similar proportions as THF. FA is even more stable than the substituted THFs.

== Food fortification ==
Folic acid fortification is a process where synthetic folic acid is added to wheat flour or other foods with the intention of promoting public health through increasing blood folate levels in the populace. It is used as it is more stable during processing and storage. After the discovery of the link between insufficient folic acid and neural tube defects, governments and health organizations worldwide made recommendations concerning folic acid supplementation for women intending to become pregnant. Because the neural tube closes in the first four weeks of gestation, often before many women even know they are pregnant, many countries in time decided to implement mandatory food fortification programs. A meta-analysis of global birth prevalence of spina bifida showed that when mandatory fortification was compared to countries with voluntary fortification or no fortification program, there was a 30% reduction in live births with spina bifida, with some countries reporting a greater than 50% reduction.

Folic acid is added to grain products in more than 80 countries, either as required or voluntary fortification, and these fortified products make up a significant source of the population's folate intake. The Food Fortification Initiative lists all countries in the world that conduct fortification programs, and within each country, what nutrients are added to which foods. As of 2025, the Global Fortification Data Exchange reports that folate is a mandatory fortified vitamin in 70 countries, exceeded only by iodine in 126 countries and iron in 87; the most commonly fortified food is wheat flour.

=== Australia and New Zealand ===
Australia and New Zealand jointly agreed to wheat flour fortification through the Food Standards Australia New Zealand in 2007. The requirement was set at 135 μg of folate per 100 g of bread. Australia implemented the program in 2009. New Zealand was also planning to fortify bread (excluding organic and unleavened varieties) starting in 2009, but then opted to wait until more research was done. The Association of Bakers and the Green Party had opposed mandatory fortification, describing it as "mass medication". Food Safety Minister Kate Wilkinson reviewed the decision to fortify in July 2009, citing as reasons to oppose claims for links between over consumption of folate with increased risk of cancer. In 2012 the delayed mandatory fortification program was revoked and replaced by a voluntary program, with the hope of achieving a 50% bread fortification target. In 2023 folic acid fortification of non-organic bread flour was made mandatory.

=== Canada ===
Canadian public health efforts focused on promoting awareness of the importance of folic acid supplementation for all women of childbearing age and decreasing socio-economic inequalities by providing practical folic acid support to vulnerable groups of women. Folic acid food fortification became mandatory in 1998, with the fortification of 150 μg of folic acid per 100 grams of enriched flour and uncooked cereal grains. The results of folic acid fortification on the rate of neural tube defects in Canada have been positive, showing a 46% reduction in prevalence of NTDs; the magnitude of reduction was proportional to the prefortification rate of NTDs, essentially removing geographical variations in rates of NTDs seen in Canada before fortification.

=== United Kingdom ===
While the Food Standards Agency recommended folic acid fortification, and wheat flour is fortified with iron, folic acid fortification of wheat flour is allowed voluntarily rather than required. A 2018 review by authors based in the United Kingdom strongly recommended that mandatory fortification be reconsidered as a means of reducing the risk of neural tube defects. In November 2024 the UK government announced legislation to require folic acid fortification in bread by the end of 2026.

=== United States ===
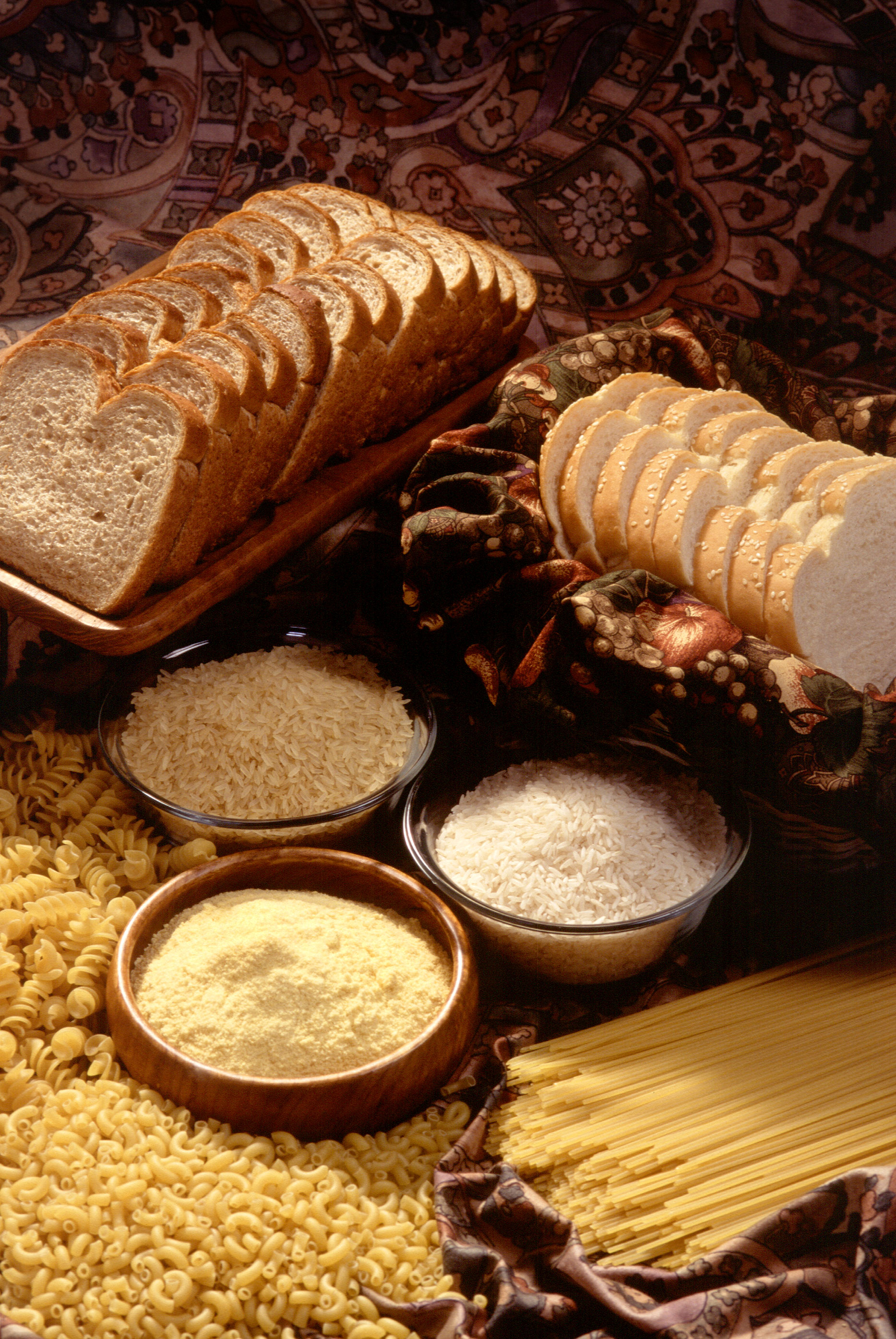
In the United States and many other countries, wheat flour is fortified with folic acid; some countries also fortify maize flour and rice.

In 1996, the United States Food and Drug Administration (FDA) published regulations requiring the addition of folic acid to enriched breads, cereals, flours, corn meals, pastas, rice, and other grain products. This ruling took effect on 1 January 1998, and was specifically targeted to reduce the risk of neural tube birth defects in newborns. There were concerns expressed that the amount of folate added was insufficient.

The fortification program was expected to raise a person's folic acid intake level by 70–130 μg/day; however, an increase of almost double that amount was actually observed. This could be from the fact that many foods are fortified by 160–175% over the required amount. Much of the elder population take supplements that add 400 μg to their daily folic acid intake. This is a concern because 70–80% of the population have detectable levels of unmetabolized folic acid in their blood, a consequence of folic acid supplementation and fortification. However, at blood concentrations achieved via food fortification, folic acid has no known cofactor function that would increase the likelihood of a causal role for free folic acid in disease development.

The U.S. National Center for Health Statistics conducts the biannual National Health and Nutrition Examination Survey (NHANES) to assess the health and nutritional status of adults and children in the United States. Some results are reported as What We Eat In America. The 2013–2014 survey reported that for adults ages 20 years and older, men consumed an average of 249 μg/day folate from food plus 207 μg/day of folic acid from consumption of fortified foods, for a combined total of 601 μg/day of dietary folate equivalents (DFEs because each microgram of folic acid counts as 1.7 μg of food folate). For women, the values are 199, 153 and 459 μg/day, respectively. This means that fortification led to a bigger increase in folic acid intake than first projected, and that more than half the adults are consuming more than the RDA of 400 μg (as DFEs). Even so, fewer than half of pregnant women are exceeding the pregnancy RDA of 600 μg/day.

Before folic acid fortification, about 4,100 pregnancies were affected by a neural tube defect each year in the United States. The Centers for Disease Control and Prevention reported in 2015 that since the addition of folic acid in grain-based foods as mandated by the FDA, the rate of neural tube defects dropped by 35%. This translates to an annual saving in total direct costs of approximately $508 million for the NTD-affected births that were prevented.

== History ==
In the 1920s, scientists believed folate deficiency and anemia were the same condition. In 1931, researcher Lucy Wills made a key observation that led to the identification of folate as the nutrient required to prevent anemia during pregnancy. Wills demonstrated that anemia could be reversed with brewer's yeast. In the late 1930s, folate was identified as the corrective substance in brewer's yeast. It was first isolated via extraction from spinach leaves by Herschel K. Mitchell, Esmond E. Snell, and Roger J. Williams in 1941. The term "folic" is from the Latin word folium (which means leaf) because it was found in dark-green leafy vegetables. Historic names included L. casei factor, vitamin B_{c} after research done in chicks and vitamin M after research done in monkeys.

Bob Stokstad isolated the pure crystalline form in 1943, and was able to determine its chemical structure while working at the Lederle Laboratories of the American Cyanamid Company. This historical research project, of obtaining folic acid in a pure crystalline form in 1945, was done by the team called the "folic acid boys", under the supervision and guidance of Director of Research Dr. Yellapragada Subbarow, at the Lederle Lab, Pearl River, New York. This research subsequently led to the synthesis of the antifolate aminopterin, which was used to treat childhood leukemia by Sidney Farber in 1948.

In the 1950s and 1960s, scientists began to discover the biochemical mechanisms of action for folate. In 1960, researchers linked folate deficiency to risk of neural tube defects. In the late 1990s, the U.S. and Canadian governments decided that despite public education programs and the availability of folic acid supplements, there was still a challenge for women of child-bearing age to meet the daily folate recommendations, which is when those two countries implemented folate fortification programs. As of December 2018, 62 countries mandated food fortification with folic acid.

== Animals ==
Veterinarians may test cats and dogs if a risk of folate deficiency is indicated. Cats with exocrine pancreatic insufficiency, more so than dogs, may have low serum folate. In dog breeds at risk for cleft lip and cleft palate dietary folic acid supplementation significantly decreased incidence.
