= 10-Formyltetrahydrofolate =

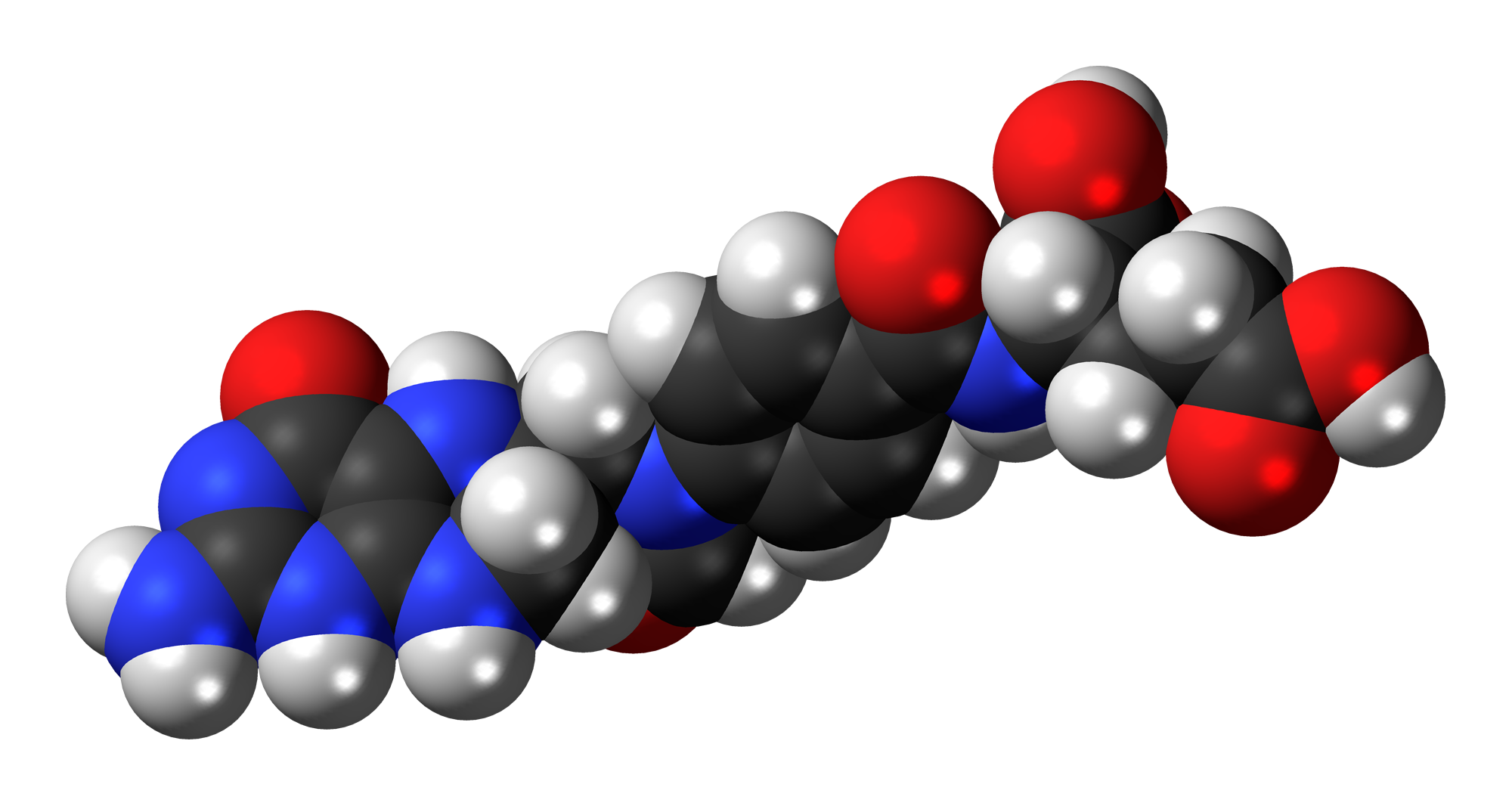

Names
- Preferred IUPAC name (2S)-2-[4-(N-{[(6Ξ)-2-Amino-4-oxo-1,4,5,6,7,8-hexahydropteridin-6-yl]methyl}formamido)benzamido]pentanedioic acid
- Other names: 10-CHO-THF; 10-FormylH_{4}folate; N^{10}-Formyltetrahydrofolate

Identifiers
CAS Number	2800-34-2
3D model (JSmol)	Interactive image
ChemSpider	109092
KEGG	C00234
MeSH	10-formyl-tetrahydrofolate
PubChem CID	135450591
UNII	43SUG29HQR
CompTox Dashboard (EPA)	DTXSID60903987
- InChI: InChI=1S/C20H23N7O7/c21-20-25-16-15(18(32)26-20)23-11(7-22-16)8-27(9-28)12-3-1-10(2-4-12)17(31)24-13(19(33)34)5-6-14(29)30/h1-4,9,11,13,23H,5-8H2,(H,24,31)(H,29,30)(H,33,34)(H4,21,22,25,26,32)/t11?,13-/m0/s1 Key: AUFGTPPARQZWDO-YUZLPWPTSA-N
- SMILES: c1cc(ccc1C(=O)N[C@@H](CCC(=O)O)C(=O)O)N(CC2CNc3c(c(=O)nc([nH]3)N)N2)C=O

Properties
Chemical formula	C_{20}H_{23}N_{7}O_{7}
Molar mass	473.44 g/mol
- Except where otherwise noted, data are given for materials in their standard state (at 25 °C [77 °F], 100 kPa). verify (what is ?) Infobox references

10-Formyltetrahydrofolate (10-CHO-THF) is a form of tetrahydrofolate that acts as a donor of formyl groups in anabolism. In these reactions 10-CHO-THF is used as a substrate in formyltransferase reactions.

== Functions ==
Two equivalents of 10-CHO-THF are required in purine biosynthesis through the pentose phosphate pathway, where 10-CHO-THF is a substrate for phosphoribosylaminoimidazolecarboxamide formyltransferase.

10-CHO-THF is required for the formylation of methionyl-tRNA formyltransferase to give fMet-tRNA.

== Formation from methenyltetrahydrofolate ==
10-CHO-THF is produced from methylenetetrahydrofolate (CH_{2}H_{4}F) via a two step process. The first step generates 5,10-methenyltetrahydrofolate:

CH_{2}H_{4}F + NAD^{+} $\rightleftharpoons$ CH_{2}H_{2}F + NADH + H^{+}

In the second step 5,10-methenyltetrahydrofolate undergoes hydrolysis:

CH_{2}H_{2}F + H_{2}O $\rightleftharpoons$ CHO-H_{4}F +

The latter is equivalently written:

5,10-methenyltetrahydrofolate + H_{2}O $\rightleftharpoons$ 10-formyltetrahydrofolate

10-CHO-THF is also produced by the reaction

ATP + formate + tetrahydrofolate $\rightleftharpoons$ ADP + phosphate + 10-formyltetrahydrofolate

This reaction is catalyzed by formate-tetrahydrofolate ligase.

It can be converted back into tetrahydrofolate (THF) by formyltetrahydrofolate dehydrogenase or THF and formate by formyltetrahydrofolate deformylase.
