= 5,10-Methylenetetrahydrofolate =

Names
- IUPAC name N-[4-(3-amino-1-oxo-1,4,5,6,6a,7-hexahydroimidazo[1,5-f]pteridin-8(9H)-yl)benzoyl]-L-glutamic acid
- Other names 5,10-CH_{2}-THF, MTHF

Identifiers
CAS Number	3432-99-3
3D model (JSmol)	Interactive image
ChEBI	CHEBI:20502
ChEMBL	ChEMBL117348
ChemSpider	97272
MeSH	5,10-methylenetetrahydrofolate
PubChem CID	108194
UNII	0SXY5ET48B
CompTox Dashboard (EPA)	DTXSID90955873
- InChI: InChI=1S/C20H23N7O6/c21-20-24-16-15(18(31)25-20)27-9-26(8-12(27)7-22-16)11-3-1-10(2-4-11)17(30)23-13(19(32)33)5-6-14(28)29/h1-4,12-13H,5-9H2,(H,23,30)(H,28,29)(H,32,33)(H4,21,22,24,25,31)/t12?,13-/m0/s1 Key: QYNUQALWYRSVHF-ABLWVSNPSA-N; InChI=1/C20H23N7O6/c21-20-24-16-15(18(31)25-20)27-9-26(8-12(27)7-22-16)11-3-1-10(2-4-11)17(30)23-13(19(32)33)5-6-14(28)29/h1-4,12-13H,5-9H2,(H,23,30)(H,28,29)(H,32,33)(H4,21,22,24,25,31)/t12?,13-/m0/s1 Key: QYNUQALWYRSVHF-ABLWVSNPBB
- SMILES: O=C(O)[C@@H](NC(=O)c1ccc(cc1)N4CC3N(C=2C(=O)/N=C(/N)NC=2NC3)C4)CCC(=O)O

Properties
Chemical formula	C_{20}H_{23}N_{7}O_{6}
Molar mass	457.44 g/mol
- Except where otherwise noted, data are given for materials in their standard state (at 25 °C [77 °F], 100 kPa). verify (what is ?) Infobox references

5,10-Methylenetetrahydrofolate (N5,N10-Methylenetetrahydrofolate; 5,10-CH_{2}-THF) is cofactor in several biochemical reactions. It exists in nature as the diastereoisomer [6R]-5,10-methylene-THF.

As an intermediate in one-carbon metabolism, 5,10-CH_{2}-THF converts to 5-methyltetrahydrofolate, 5-formyltetrahydrofolate, and methenyltetrahydrofolate. It is substrate for the enzyme methylenetetrahydrofolate reductase (MTHFR), which gives 5-methyltetrahydrofolate. It is mainly produced by the reaction of tetrahydrofolate with serine, catalyzed by the enzyme serine hydroxymethyltransferase.

== Selected functions ==
=== Formaldehyde equivalent ===
Methylenetetrahydrofolate is a source of the equivalent of formaldehyde or CH_{2}^{2+} in biosyntheses.

Methylenetetrahydrofolate is also an intermediate in the detoxification of formaldehyde.

=== Pyrimidine biosynthesis ===
It is the one-carbon donor for thymidylate synthase, for methylation of 2-deoxy-uridine-5-monophosphate (dUMP) to 2-deoxy-thymidine-5-monophosphate (dTMP). The coenzyme is necessary for the biosynthesis of thymidine and is the C1-donor in the reactions catalyzed by TS and thymidylate synthase (FAD).

=== Biomodulator ===
[6R]-5,10-methylene-THF is a biomodulator that has proven to enhance the desired cytotoxic antitumor effect of Fluorouracil (5-FU) and can bypass the metabolic pathway required by other folates (such as leucovorin) to achieve necessary activation. The active metabolite is being evaluated in clinical trials for patients with colorectal cancer in combination with 5-FU.

MTHFR metabolism: folate cycle, methionine cycle, trans-sulfuration and hyperhomocysteinemia. 5-MTHF: 5-methyltetrahydrofolate; 5,10-methylenetetrahydrofolate; BAX: Bcl-2-associated X protein; BHMT: betaine-homocysteine S-methyltransferase; CBS: cystathionine beta synthase; CGL: cystathionine gamma-lyase; DHF: dihydrofolate (vitamin B9); DMG: dimethylglycine; dTMP: thymidine monophosphate; dUMP: deoxyuridine monophosphate; FAD^{+} flavine adenine dicucleotide; FTHF: 10-formyltetrahydrofolate; MS: methionine synthase; MTHFR: methylenetetrahydrofolate reductase; SAH: S-adenosyl-L-homocysteine; SAME: S-adenosyl-L-methionine; THF: tetrahydrofolate.

== See also ==
- 5,10-Methenyltetrahydrofolate
