= Thymidine monophosphate =

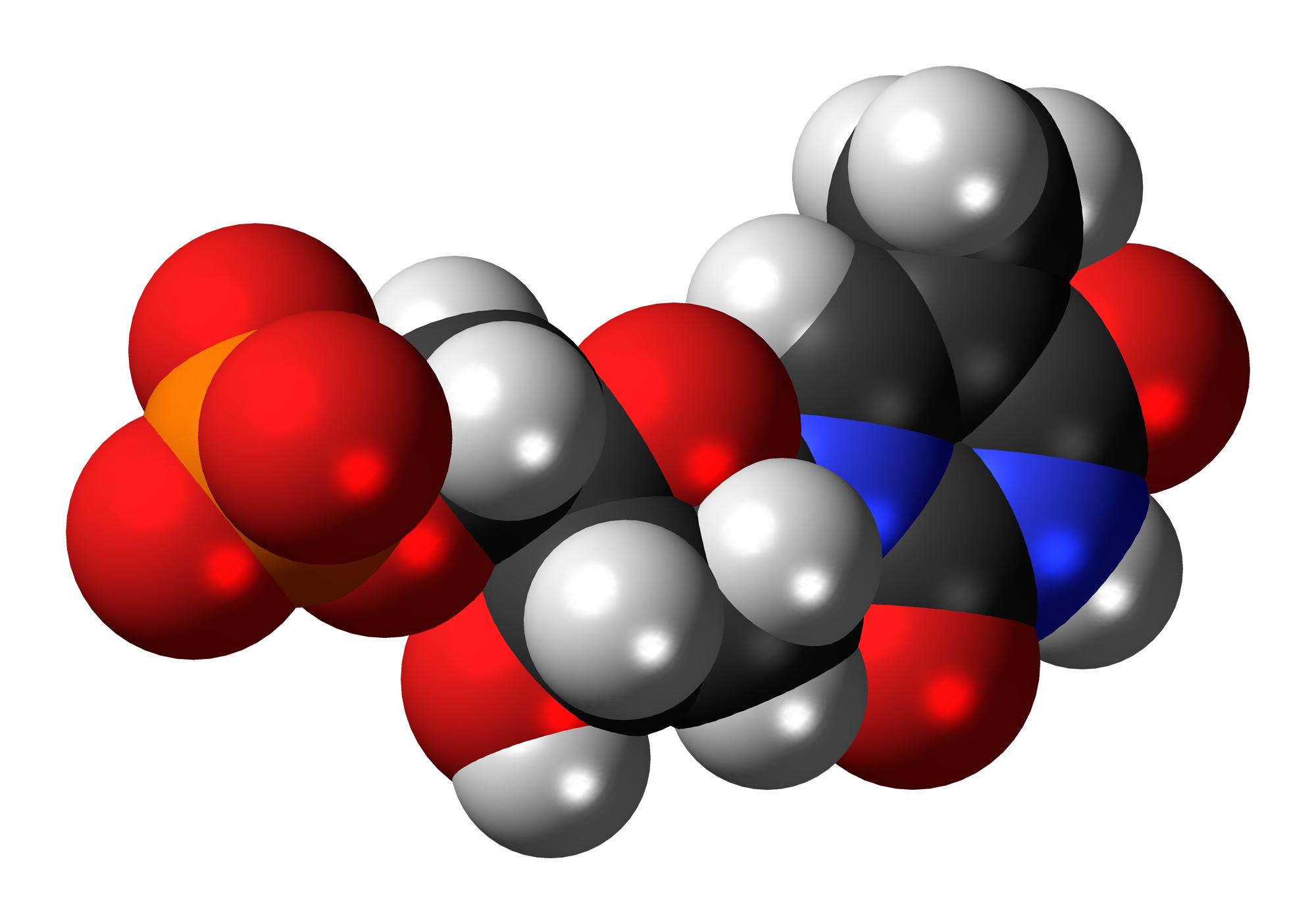

Names
- IUPAC name Thymidine monophosphate
- Other names 5'-Thymidylic acid

Identifiers
CAS Number	365-07-1
3D model (JSmol)	Interactive image
Abbreviations	dTMP
Beilstein Reference	3916216
ChEBI	CHEBI:17013
ChEMBL	ChEMBL394429
ChemSpider	9319
PubChem CID	9700
UNII	43W3021X6C
CompTox Dashboard (EPA)	DTXSID001310498
- InChI: InChI=1S/C10H15N2O8P/c1-5-3-12(10(15)11-9(5)14)8-2-6(13)7(20-8)4-19-21(16,17)18/h3,6-8,13H,2,4H2,1H3,(H,11,14,15)(H2,16,17,18)/t6-,7+,8+/m0/s1 Key: GYOZYWVXFNDGLU-XLPZGREQSA-N
- SMILES: CC1=CN(C(=O)NC1=O)C2CC(C(O2)COP(=O)(O)O)O

Properties
Chemical formula	C_{10}H_{15}N_{2}O_{8}P
Molar mass	322.2085 g mol^{−1}
- Except where otherwise noted, data are given for materials in their standard state (at 25 °C [77 °F], 100 kPa). Infobox references

Thymidine monophosphate (TMP), also known as thymidylic acid (conjugate base thymidylate), deoxythymidine monophosphate (dTMP), or deoxythymidylic acid (conjugate base deoxythymidylate), is a nucleotide that is used as a monomer in DNA. It is an ester of phosphoric acid with the nucleoside thymidine. dTMP consists of a phosphate group, the pentose sugar deoxyribose, and the nucleobase thymine. Unlike the other deoxyribonucleotides, thymidine monophosphate often does not contain the "deoxy" prefix in its name; nevertheless, its symbol often includes a "d" ("dTMP"). Dorland’s Illustrated Medical Dictionary provides an explanation of the nomenclature variation at its entry for thymidine.

As a substituent, it is called by the prefix thymidylyl-.

== Thymidine monophosphate formation ==
Cells utilize two separate pathways to produce thymidine monophosphate. One of these pathways is a salvage pathway. In the salvage pathway, thymidine (dT) undergoes phosphorylation by the enzyme TK1. By phosphorylating dT, TK1 adds a phosphate group to dT, resulting in dTMP. The other pathway that leads to the formation of TMP is a de novo, pathway. During the de novo pathway, dTMP is formed from the nucleotide deoxyuridine monophosphate (dUMP). In this pathway, thymidylate synthase (TS) adds a methyl group to deoxyuridine monophosphate to form dTMP.

== Uses in DNA ==
Following its synthesis by the salvage or de novo pathways, dTMP then goes through a series of phosphorylations that result in the deoxythymidine triphosphates (dTTP) that are vital in the synthesis of DNA. Deoxynucleotides (dNTPs) are used in the synthesis of DNA, and dTMP is a precursor to one of the dNTPs, dTTP. In cells, dTMP is synthesized into deoxythymidine diphosphate (dTDP) using thymidylate kinase. From dTDP, dTTP is then synthesized using a nucleotide diphosphate kinase. The dTTP that is synthesized from dTMPs are used in DNA synthesis in both the mitochondria and the cytosol. In addition to its role in DNA synthesis, dTTP is also a requisite for DNA repair, thus indicating the importance of dTMP in the synthesis and repair of DNA.

== See also ==
- DNA
- Nucleoside
- Nucleotide
- Oligonucleotide
- RNA
