= FLT =

FLT may refer to:

== Mathematics ==
- Fermat's Last Theorem, in number theory
  - Fermat's little theorem, using modular arithmetic
- Finite Legendre transform, in algebra

== Medicine ==
- Alovudine (fluorothymidine), a pharmaceutical drug
- Fluorothymidine F-18, a radiolabeled pharmaceutical drug

== Places ==
- Finger Lakes Trail, New York, United States
- Flitwick railway station, England
- Phaeton Airport, Haiti

== Organizations ==
- Fairlight (group), a 1980s Commodore warez group
- Flight Centre, an Australian travel company (founded 1982; ASX ticker:FLT)
- Free Federation of Workers (Spanish: Federación Libre de Trabajadores), a 20th-century Puerto Rican trade union
- Liberation Front of Chad (French: Front de Libération du Tchad), 1965–1976
- Luxembourg Tennis Federation (French: Fédération Luxembourgeoise de Tennis), a sports governing body (founded 1946)

== Other uses ==
- Flutter-tonguing, in music
- Foreign Language Teaching, in education
- FlutterCoin, crypto token (in computing)

== See also ==
- FTL (disambiguation)
