= C10H13FN2O4 =

The molecular formula C_{10}H_{13}FN_{2}O_{4} (molar mass: 244.22 g/mol) may refer to:

- Alovudine, also called fluorothymidine
- Fluorothymidine F-18 (FLT)
