= Nucleoside-diphosphate kinase =

Class of enzymes

Identifiers
- EC no.: 2.7.4.6
- CAS no.: 9026-51-1

Databases
- BRENDA: enzyme data
- ExPASy: NiceZyme view
- KEGG: enzyme entry
- MetaCyc: metabolic pathway
- Rhea: reactions
- PDB structures: RCSB PDB PDBe PDBsum
Search
- PMC: articles
- PubMed: articles
- NCBI: proteins

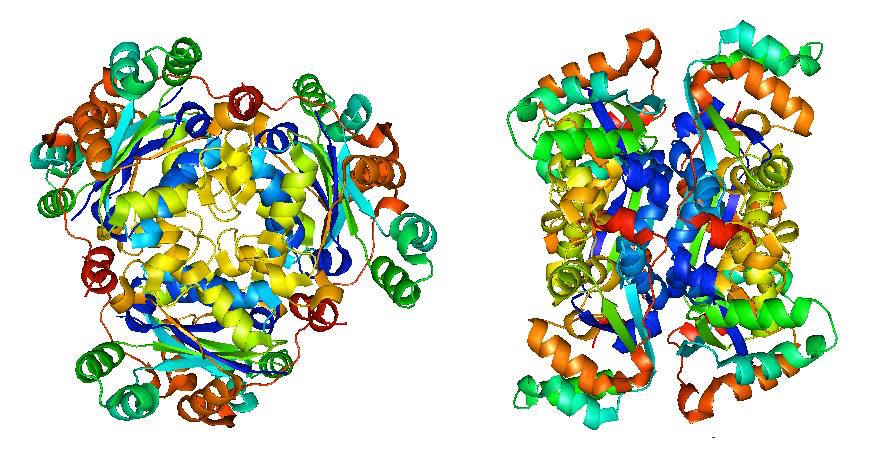
Crystal structure of NDPK in human, viewed from front and side, respectively: X-ray diffraction, 2.2 Å

Nucleoside-diphosphate kinases (NDPKs, also NDP kinase, (poly)nucleotide kinases and nucleoside diphosphokinases) are enzymes that catalyze the exchange of terminal phosphate between different nucleoside diphosphates (NDP) and triphosphates (NTP) in a reversible manner to produce nucleotide triphosphates. Many NDP serve as acceptor while NTP are donors of phosphate group. The general reaction via ping-pong mechanism is as follows: XDP + YTP ←→ XTP + YDP (X and Y each represent different nitrogenous base). NDPK activities maintain an equilibrium between the concentrations of different nucleoside triphosphates such as, for example, when guanosine triphosphate (GTP) produced in the citric acid (Krebs) cycle is converted to adenosine triphosphate (ATP). Other activities include cell proliferation, differentiation and development, signal transduction, G protein-coupled receptor, endocytosis, and gene expression.

== Structure ==
NDPK are homohexameric proteins made up of monomers approximately 152 amino acids long with a theoretical weight of 17.17KDa. The complex is found in mitochondria and in the soluble cytoplasm of cells.

== Function ==
NDPK are found in all cells, displaying not much specificity towards the types of nucleoside bases and are capable of accepting nucleotides and deoxyribonucleotides as substrates or donors. Therefore, NDPK is the source of RNA and DNA precursors, except ATP. NDPK utilize specific enzyme kinetics for multi-substrate reaction, namely ping-pong mechanism. A ping-pong mechanism integrates phosphorylation of a histidine residue by transferring terminal phosphate group (γ-phosphate) from ATP to NDP β-phosphate in order to produce a NTP, and NDPK catalyzes such reversible reactions. NTP phosphorylates a histidine, which in turn phosphorylates NDP. NDPK are involved in the synthesis of nucleoside triphosphates (NTP), such as guanosine triphosphate (GTP), cytidine triphosphate (CTP) and uridine triphosphate (UTP), thymidine triphosphate (TTP).

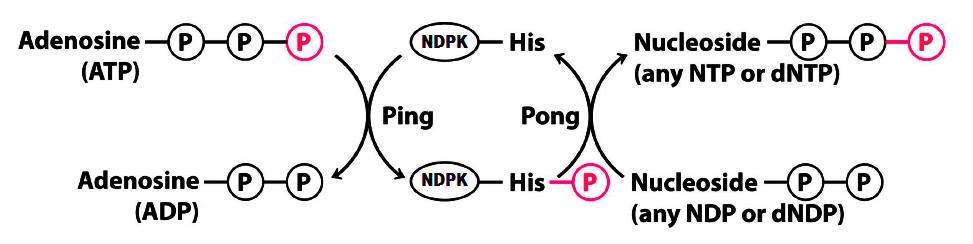
Ping-pong mechanism utilized by NDPK

Behind this apparently simple reaction is a multistep mechanism. The key steps of transphosphorylation are as follows:

- NDPK binds to a NTP1
- A phosphoryl group from NTP1 is transferred to His in active site of NDPK
- Phosphoenzyme intermediate is formed
- Initially bound NDP1 is released from NDPK bringing in new NDP2
- Phosphoryl group is transferred from NDPK-His to NDP2 or dNDP2, creating a bound NTP2
- NDPK releases the new NTP2

Each step is part of a reversible process, such that the multistep equilibrium is of the following form.

NDPK + NTP ↔ NDPK~NTP ↔ NDPK-P~NDP ↔ NDPK-P + NDP

NDPK's roles in these NTPs differ; generally, kinases bring in NTPs for nucleic acid synthesis. CTP is provided for lipid synthesis, UTP for polysaccharide synthesis while GTP is used for protein elongation and signal transduction. During cAMP-mediated signal transduction, NDPK is responsible for phosphorylating GDP released from G proteins activated from receptor binding; once ATP donates a phosphate group via activity of NDPK, GTP is consecutively bound. Increased activity of membrane-associated NDPK yields cAMP synthesis. NDPK controls K+ channels, G proteins, cell secretion, cellular energy production, and UTP synthesis.

== Regulation ==
=== Inhibition by AMPK ===
NDPK usually consumes ATP, the most abundant cellular nucleotide, and stores the nucleotides. However, consumption of ATP would definitely influence the cellular energy balance, which brings upon the regulation of AMP-activated protein kinase (AMPK). AMPK acts as the energy sensor and regulates ATP pathways by turning the generating pathways or not. Because of such activity, AMPK could directly inhibit NDPK through phosphorylation. To be more specific, NDPK supports the production of nucleotides in high-energy and low-stress cellular states. However, this can only happen when AMPK is inactivated because low-stress cellular states of ATP triggers the activation of AMPK, which eventually decreases NDPK activity by phosphorylating serine residues.

== Prokaryotic systems ==
In most prokaryotes, the NDPK enzyme is tetrameric. It has been reported in a number of pathogens. NDPK function has been studied in Escherichia coli, Bacillus subtilis, Salmonella typhimurium, Micrococcus luteus, and Myxococcus xanthus. Prokaryotic NDPK forms a functional homotetramer. Nucleoside diphosphate kinase activity involves the transfer of the γ-phosphate of nucleoside triphosphate (NTP) to nucleoside diphosphate (NDP), where N1 and N2 can be ribo- or deoxyribonucleosides. This is done via a high energy phosphohistidine intermediate. Besides involvement in the synthesis of pyrimidine nucleotides, prokaryotic NDPK is also involved in several metabolism cycles. NDPK has also been discovered to act as a protein histidine kinase, which involves a reversible histidine phosphorylation as a well-known regulatory signal. However, in most prokaryotes, NDPK expression levels are involved in the cell growth, development and differentiation of the organism, especially bacteria.

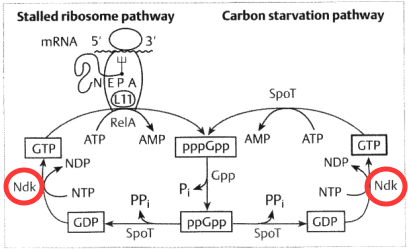
NDPK is the enzyme triggering the dephosphorylation of GTP to GDP in the ppGpp cycle.

=== (p)ppGpp metabolism ===
In the (p)ppGpp biosynthesis cycle, NDPK serves an important role. When there is an absence of a charged tRNA in the A site of a ribosome, the ribosome will stall and trigger the synthesis of the guanosine pentaphosphate ((p)ppGpp) molecule. (p)ppGpp biosynthesis is a part of the purine metabolism pathway and coordinates a series of cellular activities in response to nutritional abundances. Synthesis of (p)ppGpp is triggered by carbon starvation, or the lack of carbon in the cell's environment, and causes the protein SpoT to activate. SpoT works in conjunction with NDPK and both serve as essential enzymes in the (p)ppGpp biosynthesis cycle. NDPK synthesizes the formation of GDP from GTP via dephosphorylation.

=== Nm23 gene function ===
While the biomolecular mechanism by which the Nm23 gene works in cells is currently unknown, like in most prokaryotes, nucleoside diphosphate kinase (NDPK) expression levels determine cell growth and differentiation. Normally, the Nm23 gene (NME) is involved in metastasis suppression in humans. In prokaryotes, the Nm23 gene is involved in normal cell development and differentiation. Highly conserved homologues of the Nm23 gene have been found in prokaryotes, more specifically, Myxococcus xanthus, a gram-negative soil bacteria. Homologues of Nm23 in M. xanthus have been closed and characterized as a nucleoside diphosphate kinase (ndk gene) and seems to be essential for M. xanthus growth. During M. xanthus development, nucleoside diphosphate kinase activity has also been shown to drastically decrease.

== Eukaryotic systems ==
There are at least four enzymatically active isoforms of NDPK in humans: NDPK-A, NDPK-B, NDPK-C and NDPK-D. All four isoforms have very similar structures and can combine in any form to become functional NDPK hexamers. NDPK is suggested to participate in transmembrane signaling in eukaryotic cells.

=== In humans ===
In eukaryotic systems, the role of the NDK is to synthesize nucleoside triphosphates other than ATP. The ATP gamma phosphate is transferred to the NDP beta phosphate via a ping-pong mechanism, using a phosphorylated active-site intermediate, and synthesize products such as UTP. NDK possesses nucleoside-diphosphate kinase, serine/threonine-specific protein kinase, geranyl and farnesyl pyrophosphate kinase, histidine protein kinase, and 3'-5' exonuclease activities. Its processes are involved with cell proliferation, differentiation and development, and gene expression in human cells. It is also part of the neural development process, which includes neural patterning and cell fate determination. Furthermore, NDPK is involved with the signal transduction processes and G protein-coupled receptor endocytosis as it transfers a phosphate group onto the G β-subunits and convert GDP to GTP. This increase in GTP concentration near G protein α-subunits causes activation of G protein α-subunits for G-protein signaling. In addition to signaling, NDPK is involved in controlling K+ channels, cell secretion, and cellular energy production.

=== In plants ===
The biochemical reactions catalyzed by NDP kinase in plants are analogous to activities described in humans as autophosphorylation activity takes place from ATP and GTP. In addition to this, plants have four types of NDPK isoforms. Cytosolic type I NDPK is involved in metabolism, growth, and stress responses in plants. Type II NDPK is concentrated in the chloroplast and it is believed to be involved in the photosynthesis process and the oxidative stress management, but its function is not yet known clearly. Type III NDPK targets both mitochondria and chloroplast, and it is mainly involved in energy metabolism. The localization and exact function of the type IV NDPK is not yet well known and needs further investigations. In addition, NDPK is associated with H_{2}O_{2}-mediated mitogen-activated protein kinase signaling in plants.

== Diseases related to NDPK ==
Ten paralogous genes code for the proteins NDPKs, which are separated into two groups. The first group encodes proteins with NDPK functions. The other group genes code for other various proteins that display low or no NDPK activities. In the first group, one of the genes named NM23 was identified as the first metastasis suppressor protein and its gene Nm23 was less activated in metastatic cells. In a different experiment, human Nm23 was cultured with cancer cells and showed inhibition of metastasis. The level of NM23 protein was inversely proportional to the metastatic potential for human solid tumors. However, other tumor types such as ovarian cancers, neuroblastoma and hematological malignancies displayed upregulated NM23 levels in patient samples. Therefore, understanding the biological basis of the Nm23 gene family is necessary to have a firm knowledge of its diverse results.

=== Cardiovascular disease ===
Nme2, one of the NDPK genes, has been associated with cardiovascular functions. Nme2 gene is known to form a complex with the beta subunit of the heterotrimetric G protein in heart cells and regulates the contractility of heart. There are two functions of Nme2 that allow for such regulation; one is the histidine kinase activity, which is the phosphorylation of the channels to regulate what goes through and the other is a scaffold function of the formation of caveolae. The depletion of Nme2/caveolin interaction exhibited a decreased rate of cardiac contractility. Furthermore, more studies with zebra fish revealed that the NDPK depletion has a detrimental effect on heart functioning.

=== Nme1 and Nme2 as a suppressor of metastasis ===
There was a lot of debate on whether NM23 gene is responsible for suppressing or activating metastasis. The two contradicting sides on this subject remained ambiguous and undefined throughout the course of NDPK studies. However, recent experiments began to show evidence for NM23 being a suppressor of metastasis. Nme2 was tagged as an anti-metastasis gene, using the tissue chip technology and immunohistochemistry. When Nme2 gene products were over-produced in gastric cancer cells, there was a decrease in proliferation, migration, and invasion of such cancer cells. The cell cultures revealed that Nme2 impacts gastric cancer cells, but the question still remains about what regulates Nme2 activities among various cancer types. Nme1 was found in great number in poorly metastatic sublines of melanoma cells. Also, the transfection of Nme1 into a highly metastatic melanoma line significantly reduced metastasis. This theory has been tested with mice as well; the Nme1-deficient mice formed greater lung metastases than wild type mice, showing that this gene has suppressing activity. Invasion of cancer occurs due to changes in cell adhesion and it is caused by gene expression changes in the epithelial-mesenchymal transition (EMT). Surprisingly, there are many adhesion molecules, motility factors, signaling pathways, proteolytic events, EMT hallmarks, and other transcriptional programs that have been linked to the Nme1 proteins. These proteins go about interrupting metastasis by binding metastasis-promoting proteins. The Nme1 proteins bind to viral proteins, oncogenes, and other metastasis-promoting factors. The binding may be indirect by using the signaling complex.

== See also ==
- Nucleoside
- Nucleotide
- Nucleoside monophosphate
- Nucleoside triphosphate
- Thymidine kinase
- Thymidylate kinase
- Thymidine kinase in clinical chemistry
- Thymidylate synthase
