= 3'-Fluoro-3'-deoxythymidine =

3'-Fluoro-3'-deoxythymidine may refer to:

- Alovudine (fluorothymidine)
- Fluorothymidine F-18
