= Thymidine kinase from herpesvirus =

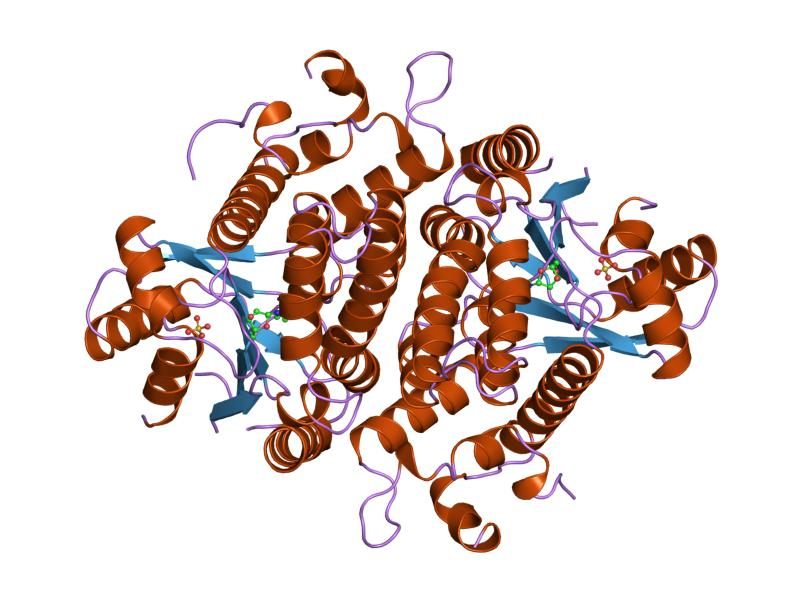
- Structure of thymidine kinase from herpesvirus.

Identifiers
- Symbol: Herpes_TK
- Pfam: PF00693
- InterPro: IPR001889
- SCOP2: 1kin / SCOPe / SUPFAM
Available protein structures:
- PDB: 1e2pB:56-330 1e2jB:56-330 1vtk :56-330 1of1B:56-330 1e2lA:56-330 1e2kA:56-330 1p7cA:56-330 1e2mB:56-330 1ki6A:56-330 1e2hB:56-330 3vtk :56-330 1e2nA:56-330 1e2iB:56-330 2vtk :56-330 1osnC:19-299 1p72A:32-309 1p75B:32-309 1p73D:32-309 1p6xA:32-309 IPR001889 PF00693 (ECOD; PDBsum)
- AlphaFold: IPR001889; PF00693

Thymidine kinase from herpesvirus is a sub-family of thymidine kinases that catalyses the transfer of phospho group of ATP to thymidine to generate thymidine monophosphate, which serves as a substrate during viral DNA replication.

Its presence in herpesvirus-infected cells is used to activate a range of antivirals against herpes infection, and thus specifically target the therapy towards infected cells only.

Such antivirals include:

- Purine analogues of guanine: Aciclovir, Famciclovir, Ganciclovir, Penciclovir, Valaciclovir, Valganciclovir
- Vidarabine
- Pyrimidine analogues of uridine: Idoxuridine, Trifluridine
- Brivudine

Mutations in the gene coding thymidine kinase in herpes viruses can endow the virus with resistance to aciclovir. In these situations, alternative medications that are of use include other guanine analogues such as famciclovir, valaciclovir and penciclovir.

== Function and role ==
Overall, herpesviruses are large DNA viruses varying from 120 to 260 nm long. Each virus particle contains a core with linear DNA, a capsid with 162 capsomeres, a loose protein integument, and an outer fatty membrane. Some genes within the herpesvirus can be removed which makes the virus weaker, allowing it to train the immune system without causing major disease which is useful for vaccines. Along with this, deleted sections can be replaced with foreign genes, which the virus can deliver to target cells. Thymidine kinase is part of the nucleoside salvage pathway which recycles broken-down DNA to be used again. TK helps the virus make DNA. With HSV-1 TK (herpes virus type 1 thymidine kinase) specifically, it has the ability to phosphorylate multiple different nucleotides and nucleoside analogues.

Herpesvirus genes are turned on in a specific order – starting with immediate early (IE) genes, then early (E) genes, and finally late (L) genes. The groups are reliant on each other for when the next group is activated. The thymidine kinase gene is part of the early (E) gene group. It can be expressed at low levels in few non-virus systems due to the fact that its promoter contains cellular control elements that can be used by regular cell transcription factors. In an HSV (herpes simplex virus) infection, thymidine kinase expression requires activation by immediate early (IE) proteins and is dependent on the host cell’s RNA polymerase II apparatus to transcribe efficiently.

Thymidine kinase is seen in a wide variety of bacterial, eukaryotic, and prokaryotic cells. Cells have specific TK enzymes including TK1 which is systolic and mainly active when cells prepare to divide, and TK2 which is mitochondrial and helps maintain the mitochondrial DNA. They both have the role of adding a phosphate to thymidine, creating dTMP. In order for this to happen, ATP acts as the phosphate donor, and magnesium ions (Mg^{2+}) ions are present to help the reaction occur.

A majority of herpesviruses, along with some DNA viruses, including vaccinia virus, African swine fever virus, and Rana grylio virus contain a gene encoding for thymidine kinase. Specifically in HSV-1, the expression of TK is important and it relies heavily on it during its lifecycle.

HSV-1 TK is able to recognize nucleosides (thymidine and deoxycytidine) and nucleoside analogue drugs (acyclovir). When thymidine kinase phosphorylates these, they become active and interfere with viral DNA replication. When regarding antiherpesvirus treatment and therapeutic targets in cancer gene therapy, thymidine kinase is a key component.

== Pyrimidine salvage pathway ==
Thymidine kinase is also a core enzyme with the pyrimidine salvage pathway which is the cell’s recycling system for DNA building blocks. It takes a thymidine (DNA base) and adds a phosphate group with the use of ATP, which produces dTMP which is needed for the cell to make DNA. HSV-1 TK can recognize and phosphorylate many different molecules including pyrimidines and pyrimidine analogs, and purine analogs. Pyrimidine analogs contain thymidine, deoxycytidine, and AZT. Purine analogs contain acyclovir, ganciclovir, buciclovir, and penciclovir. This broad activity is important as the thymidine kinase can activate not just nucleosides, but their analogs as well. When HSV-1 TK phosphorylates a nucleoside analog, it adds the first phosphate, and then cellular kinases add two more phosphates which converts it to a nucleoside triphosphate, which is then inserted into the DNA causing synthesis to stall and ultimately leads to cell death. These cells that express HSV-1 TK contain a vulnerability of being able to be killed by drugs that normal cells do not have the ability to activate efficiently. A guanosine analog known as acyclovir (ACV) is an antiviral drug that is, even in high dosage, mostly nontoxic. HSV-1 TK contains a high K_{m} for ACV, meaning that the enzyme binds poorly and activates inefficiently. ACV is an option used for herpes infections, but it is not potent enough for cancer suicide gene therapy. Concerning the ability of thymidine kinase being used to cause cell death, not all cells need to contain the TK gene to be susceptible. This is called the bystander effect where nearby cells can die due to gap junctions where activated drug molecules can pass through its channels, apoptotic vesicles, and through immune response where the immune system clears nearby tumor cells due to inflammation.

== Cancer gene therapy ==
HSV-1 TK has recently been used as a suicide gene for cancer therapy. This is a strategy where tumor cells are used to create an enzyme that makes a harmless drug toxic. The TK enzyme itself has the ability to activate some antiviral drugs, like ganciclovir, causing the cancer cell to make the drug toxic, which ultimately kills the cell. HSV-1 TK gene therapy has worked in multiple animal tumor models and has progressed into clinical trials on human cancers. The HSV-1 TK protein can be exploited in medicine because it has a phosphorylation ability with certain molecules. It can be used in antiviral drugs. As a cancer “suicide gene” therapy because when taking a certain drug, like ganciclovir, the TK enzyme in cancer cells activates the drug and selectively kills cancer. Cells in thymidine kinase can be used in stem cell regulation and treatment of parasites.

HSV TK being used as a suicide gene lets there be different specificity levels in GvHD control. GvHD is also known as graft versus host disease where complications can occur after an allogenic transplant where hematopoietic stem cells are transplanted in the body from a donor. This becomes GvHD when the grafted cells view the host cells as a threat, causing the donor cells to attack the recipient. Only transduced cells have the ability to convert the prodrug from passive to active. As well as this, T-cells that are gene modified are the only ones that can convert the prodrug to its active form. The modified cells that express HSV TK behave normally unless the patient is given ganciclovir (GCV). GCV will be converted when the cell is undergoing DNA replication. This lets GCV act as an off switch to kill modified T-cells.

== HSV-1 TK mutant engineered for better activity with ganciclovir or acyclovir ==
Mark S. Kokoris and Margaret E. Black generated a random mutagenesis library of HSV-1 TK and used its active site to make variants with altered substrate specificity. From that library, they identified seven TK variants that had increased activity to the prodrugs ganciclovir (GCV) or acyclovir (ACV) through selection in E. coli. Three TK mutant enzymes and wild type TK were purified to homogeneity using a novel affinity chromatography column method. The substrate affinity was tested and showed that for GCV, mutant SR39 had a 14 fold decrease in K_{m} in comparison to the wild type TK. In ACV, mutant SR26 had a 124 fold decrease in K_{m} in comparison to wild-type TK. Both of these show a substantial increase in affinity for both prodrugs. These mutant thymidine kinases with increased affinity and specificity suggest that there could be an improvement in the safety and effectiveness of this approach in suicide gene therapy.

ACV having a strong affinity increase by SR26 is significant because it is a much less toxic drug than GCV, which raises the possibility of introducing ACV into suicide gene therapy which was previously limited by the wild type TK not being efficient enough with ACV. The advantage of using the mutant thymidine kinases over the wild type with either ACV or GCV is that it would still allow for tumor cells to be killed, but with a lower immunosuppressive burden.

With the wild type TK, it has a high K_{m} with ACV which means there is inefficient activation which also comes from competition from the natural substrate thymidine. The mutant thymidine kinase may have the ability to shift this through reducing the K_{m} with prodrugs. This would improve the prodrug activation even in the presence of cellular thymidine.

== HSV being used as a source for thymidine kinase in TK deficient mouse cells ==
Richard L. Davidson, S.J. Adelstein, and Michael N. Oxman did a study involving thymidine deficient mouse cells which they infected with inactivated herpes simplex virus (HSV). After the transformation, the viral enzyme expression could be suppressed and reactivated through high efficiency. The mouse cells lacking thymidine kinase were named LM(TK–) clone 1D, which had a resistance to 5-bromodeoxyuridine (BrdU). The TK– cells were infected with ultraviolet inactivated HSV-1, strain VR-3. Once infected, the “transformed” cell clones that regained TK activity (became TK+) were isolated. Despite the virus being inactivated, the cells that lacked TK still transformed and displayed TK activity. They monitored the stability of the TK activity over a time period through culturing the transformed cells in a non selective medium. They then observed the proportion of cells that expressed the viral TK declined over time exponentially. Though there was a decline after multiple generations, the viral TK still had the ability to be reactivated in cells that lost any trace of TK activity – but at a very low frequency. The TK being able to reactivate showed that the gene was not lost, rather its expression had been suppressed, but could show up again under specific conditions.

The authors gathered from their research that there was evidence for the integration or stable expression of a viral gene. The TK– mouse cells that were infected with inactivated HSV became TK+ which shows that thymidine kinase had been transferred to those cells. The slow decline of TK expression in the cells over time showed that expression within the viral gene could be suppressed or silenced, but despite this it still could be reactivated – showing that the gene was not actually lost.

== Noninvasive imaging HSV TK gene transfer and expression ==
=== Methods ===
The research was done by Juri G. Tjuvajev, Ronald Finn, Revathi Joshi, et al. The noninvasive imaging of herpes simplex virus type 1 thymidine kinase (HSV-1 TK) was done via a gamma camera and a single photo emission tomography with fluoro-2’-deoxy-1-β-D-arabinofuranosyl-5-iodo-uracil (FIAU). The study was performed on rats with tumors produced by injection of wild type RG2 glioma or W256 mammary carcinoma cells in one flank and RG2TK+ glioma or W256TK+ mammary carcinoma cells into the other flank. They were determining if imaging with radiolabeled FIAU was sensitive enough to detect HSV-1 TK gene expression post transduction of RG2 and W256 tumors with the usage of a retroviral vector containing the HSV-1 TK gene.

Their RG2 rat glioma cell line was provided through Duke University Medical Center, Durham, NC with the courtesy of Dr. D. Bigner. The W256 cells were gathered from the American Type Culture Collection. The gp-STK-A2 vector producing cell line that creates recombinant replication deficient STK retrovirus with NeoR and HSV-1 TK genes was obtained from the Memorial Veterans Hospital, Bedford, MA and Dr. F. Moolten. All of them were grown in monolayers with 10% FCS. The in vitro transduction of the RG2 and W256 cells was done via cell monolayer exposure to the STK retrovirus and Polybrene for eight hours and then a 24 hour incubation until resistant colony formation occurred. To see if there was usable expression of HSV-1 TK genes, they were tested through sensitivity to ganciclovir and then compared to wild type. Radioactivity was also measured for the control activity (ganciclovir free). The experimental use of animals was approved through the Institutional Animal Care and Use Committee at the Memorial Sloan-Kettering Cancer Center.

The rats had been injected with tumor cells. In the right flank they injected wild type RG2 or W256, and in the left flank they injected HSV-1 TK transduced RG2TK+ and W256TK+ cells. To induce in vivo transduction with HSV-1 TK, the wild type RG2 tumors were injected with gp-STK-A2 vector producer cells in DME. They allowed the tumors to grow roughly 0.6-0.7 cm before administering the injections. Then the rats experienced MRI scans through a General Electric CSI system. Beforehand, the rats were anesthetized with a 1.5% isoflurane, 70% nitrous oxide, and 30% oxygen mixture. T_{2} weighted images of the tumor area were obtained. Tumors were seen in zones containing a hyperintense T_{2} signal. The synthesis of no-carrier-added was done by reacting 2’-fluoro-2’deoxy-1-β-arabinofuranosyl-uracil with sodium iodide using iodogen and then product isolation vs column chromatography. After 14 days, no-carrier-added was injected into the tumors, blocking thyroid uptake of radioactive iodide. Then gamma imaging occurred 4, 24, 36, and 48 hours after the injection. They calculated the tumor volume and transduced tumor volume from serial histological sections of tumor. After imaging, the rats were killed by euthanasia, the tumors extracted and frozen to be used for QAR and histology. Sections of the tumor tissue were reacted with goat anti-rabbit biotinylated IgG then stained with a Vectastain Elite kit and a chromagen - 3,3’-diamino-benzidine tetrahydrochloride. The chromogen allowed for brown staining in the areas containing HSV-1 TK expression. They were then counterstained using ethyl green to create a nuclear stain.

=== Results ===
Prior to the imaging portion of the study, they compared how differing cell lines, W256TK+, W256, RG2TK+, and RG2, responded to ganciclovir and their FIAU accumulation. With W256TK+ cells, they were roughly 3000 times more sensitive to GCV than the wild type version. Along with this, they were also around 140 times more sensitive than the RG2TK+ cells. There were 3 groups of rats that underwent the study.

The first group had 4 rats that had W256TK+ and wild type W256 tumors in opposite flanks, the tumors grew and then rats were given FIAU. Gamma camera and SPECT images were taken at the 4, 24, and 36 hour marks. The imaging showed that there was high radioactivity only in the W256TK+ tumor, whereas wild type W256 tumors had low FIAU accumulation. The areas with high FIAU uptake patched zones of tumor tissue with strong HSV-1 TK immunostaining.

The second group had 2 rats that contained wild type RG2 tumors in one flank and transduced RG2TK+ cells were injected into the tumor on the opposite flank. Following two weeks, FIAU imaging was done. The gamma imaging was done at 24 and 48 hour marks after the addition of FIAU. Both tumors contained high FIAU radioactivity levels. MRI SPECT imaging showed more precise results that FIAU levels were specifically higher in the RG2TK+ tumors in comparison to the RG2 tumors.

The third group had 2 rats that contained wild type W256 and W256TK+ tumors in opposite flanks; after 2 weeks, they were injected with FIAU. Gamma imaging was done at the 24 and 48 hour intervals post FIAU injection. This imaging showed that there were high FIAU radioactivity levels in the W256TK+ tumors, whereas wild type did not retain as much notable radiation. Though not statistically relevant, the FIAU accumulation in W256TK+ was higher than the RG2TK+ cells.

Quantitative autoradiogram, histology, and immunohistochemistry for the HSV-1 TK protein was done for portions of the W256TK+ tumor. Zones with higher levels of FIAU radioactivity corresponded with high expression of HSV-1 TK protein. And vice versa regarding lower levels of FIAU radioactivity corresponding with low expression of HSV-1 TK protein. Necrotic tumor portions contained no important FIAU radioactivity accumulation. There proved to be a decent correspondent regarding the % dose per gram values acquired by the gamma, SPECT, and QAR imaging from the three measurement methods of gamma, SPECT, and QAR imaging showed consistent matching results that proved to identify the same regions that expressed HSV-1 TK and higher levels of FIAU. The authors determined that their study provided a clear demonstration of HSV-1 TK protein being expressed in animal tumors that have the ability to be imaged with the use of FIAU and gamma camera imaging. Their noninvasive imaging method is a possible tool for tracking and assessing gene therapy for humans. Furthermore, the use of radioiodinated 2’-fluoro-nucleoside analogs along with PET imaging have the ability to enhance accuracy and sensitivity when detecting HSV-1 TK expression.
