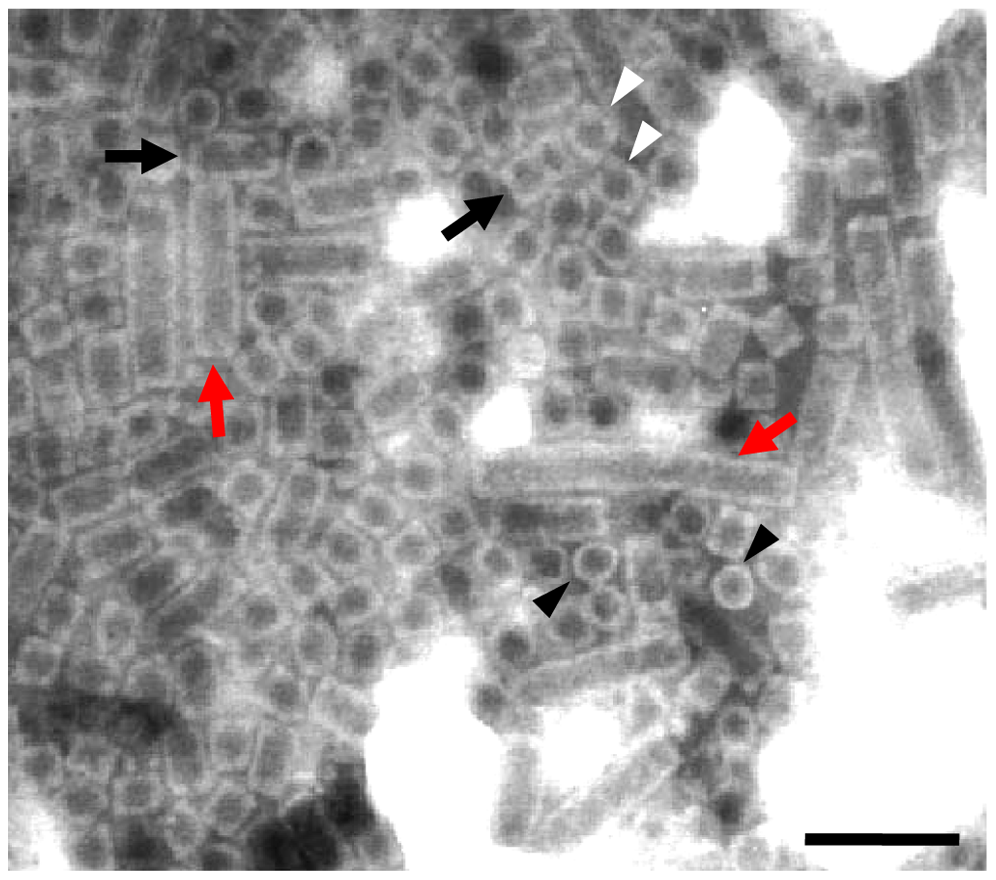
- Abalone shriveling syndrome-associated virus particles are shown from the side view as long flexible/rigid rectangles (red arrows) and short rectangles (black arrows). The circles (black arrowheads) and cubes (white arrowheads) from the top view and side views, respectively, are all similar to typical hemocyanin architectures. Scale bar, 100 nm

Virus classification
- (unranked): Virus
- Virus: Abalone shriveling syndrome-associated virus

= Abalone shriveling syndrome-associated virus =

Virus affecting abalone snails

Abalone shriveling syndrome-associated virus was described in 2010 from an abalone which had died from abalone shriveling syndrome.

== Taxonomy ==
While the ICTV does not include the Abalone shriveling syndrome-associated virus or the Abalone muscle atrophy virus, as of August 13, the NCBI puts it under the Caudoviricetes class as an unclassified virus.

== Genome ==
The genome is double stranded circular DNA with 34,952 base pairs and encodes 28 putative open reading frames. The G+C content of the genome is 39.5%. The functions of several of these proteins is known: these include the terminase, endonuclease, exonuclease, resolvase, helicase, primase and single-stranded binding protein. Seven other proteins appear to be structural in nature (head/tail proteins). Another protein encoded by the genome is thymidylate kinase. The remaining proteins have no known homologs and their function remains unknown.
