= Stampidine =

Medication

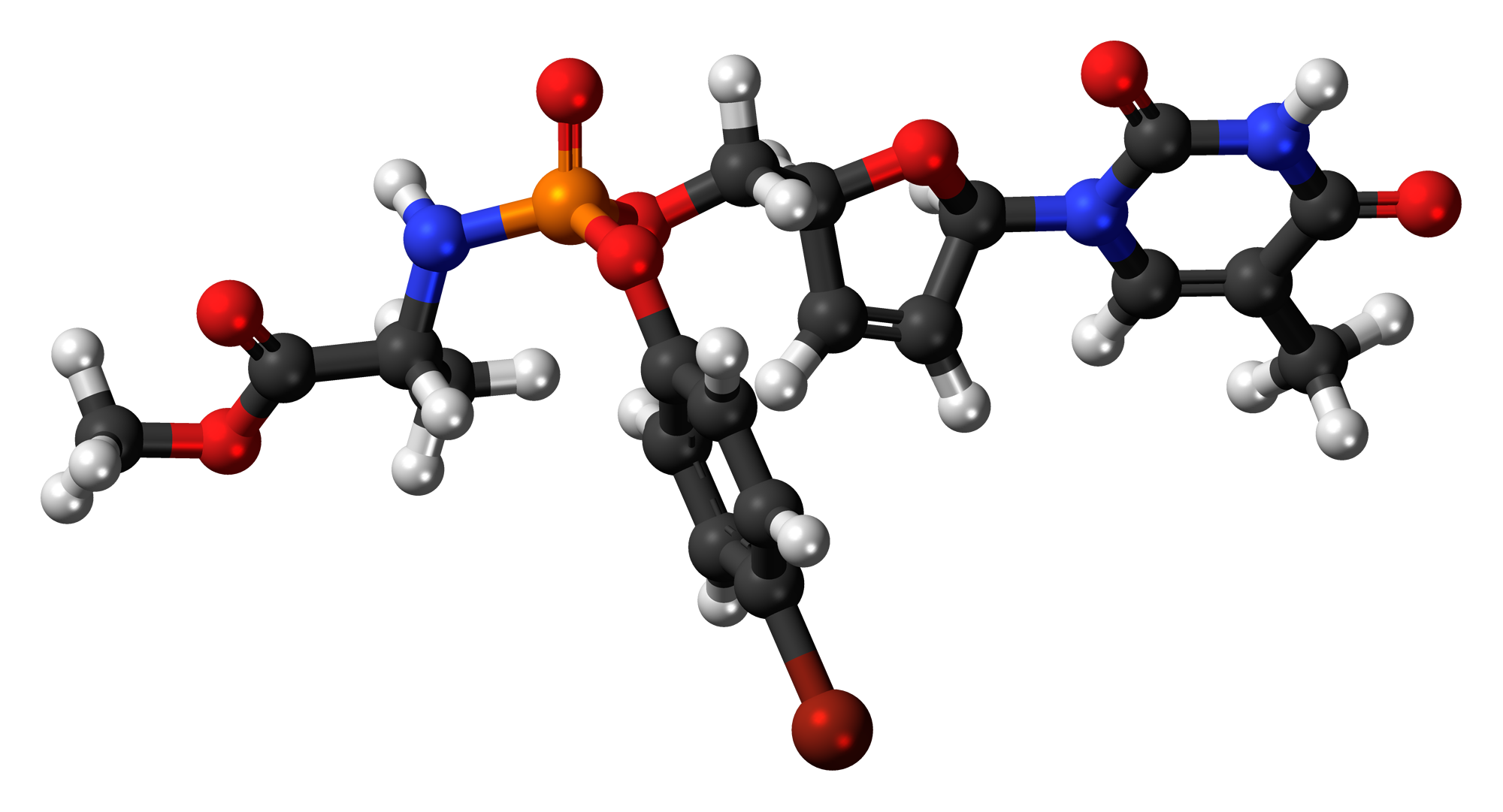

Clinical data
- ATC code: none

Identifiers
- IUPAC name: methyl N-((4-bromophenoxy){[(2S,5R)-5-(5-methyl-2,4-dioxo-3,4-dihydropyrimidin-1(2H)-yl)-2,5-dihydrofuran-2-yl]methoxy}phosphoryl)-D-alaninate
- CAS Number: 217178-62-6
- PubChem CID: 469782
- ChemSpider: 412689
- UNII: MHN9I3MQ1X
- CompTox Dashboard (EPA): DTXSID80944332

Chemical and physical data
- Formula: C_{20}H_{23}BrN_{3}O_{8}P
- Molar mass: 544.295 g·mol^{−1}
- 3D model (JSmol): Interactive image
- SMILES: Cc1cn(c(=O)[nH]c1=O)[C@H]2C=C[C@H](O2)COP(=O)(N[C@H](C)C(=O)OC)Oc3ccc(cc3)Br
- InChI: InChI=1S/C20H23BrN3O8P/c1-12-10-24(20(27)22-18(12)25)17-9-8-16(31-17)11-30-33(28,23-13(2)19(26)29-3)32-15-6-4-14(21)5-7-15/h4-10,13,16-17H,11H2,1-3H3,(H,23,28)(H,22,25,27)/t13-,16+,17-,33?/m1/s1; Key:VPABMVYNSQRPBD-AOJMVMDXSA-N

Stampidine is an experimental nucleoside reverse transcriptase inhibitor (NRTI) with anti-HIV activity.

It is a derivative of stavudine (d4T, brand name Zerit), and has been designed to avoid dependence on the rate limiting step of phosphorylation of stavudine to stavudine monophosphate. This is governed by the supply of thymidine kinase that is available, and stavudine is poorly phosphorylated to its monophosphate form in thymidine kinase-deficient cells.

== Preclinical pharmacology ==
Stampidine exhibited:

- subnanomolar to low nanomolar in vitro antiretroviral potency against genotypically and phenotypically NRTI-resistant primary clinical HIV isolates, non-nucleoside reverse transcriptase inhibitor (NNRTI)-resistant HIV-1 isolates, clinical non-B subtype HIV-1 isolates (subtypes A, C, F, and G) originating from South America, Asia, and sub-Saharan Africa with resistance to stavudine, adefovir and tenofovir, as well as recombinant HIV clones containing common patterns of RT mutations responsible for NRTI resistance such as multiple TAMs plus M184V, multiple TAMs plus T69 insertion, and Q151 complex,
- favorable safety profile in mice, rats, dogs, and cats, and
- promising prophylactic in vivo antiretroviral activity in Hu-PBL-SCID mice as well as therapeutic anti-retroviral activity in FIV-infected domestic cats.

Stampidine epigenetically modulates the host transcriptome in a unique manner, silences expression of a distinct set of genes encoding transcription factors and signal transduction molecules, and prevents HIV infection from distorting and disrupting key cellular transcriptional networks. At nanomolar concentrations that are 4-logs lower than those achieved at its non-toxic dose levels in mice, rats, cats, and dogs, stampidine switched off genes for several HDFs that are required for HIV replication in T-cells. Notably, stampidine reversed the effects of HIV exposure on the host transcriptome regardless of NRTI-sensitivity or RT mutations of the HIV isolate used and inhibited the replication of 17 NRTI-resistant HIV-1 strains, including recombinant HIV clones containing common patterns of RT mutations responsible for NRTI resistance, in human peripheral blood mononuclear cells (PBMC) with subnanomolar-nanomolar IC_{50} values.

Unlike available antiretroviral agents that disrupt a specific step in the life cycle of HIV, stampidine has the potential to abrogate all steps in the life cycle of HIV.
