= Fluorothymidine =

Fluorothymidine may refer to:

- Alovudine (fluorothymidine)
- Fluorothymidine F-18
