= Thymidine kinase =

Enzyme found in most living cells

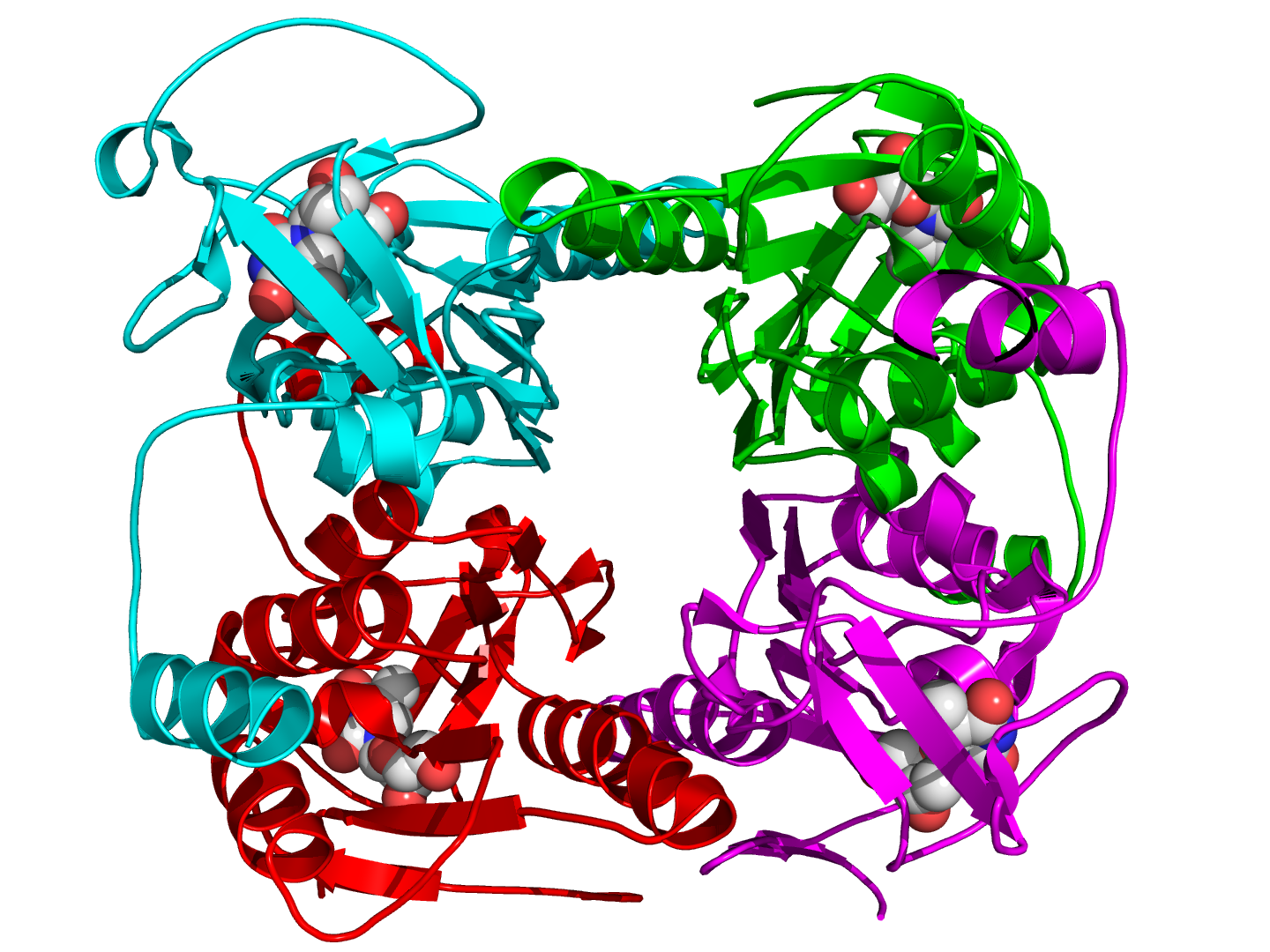
- Crystal structure of a tetramer of thymidine kinase from U. urealyticum (where the monomers are color cyan, green, red, and magenta respectively) in complex with thymidine (space-filling model, carbon = white, oxygen = red, nitrogen = blue).

Identifiers
- EC no.: 2.7.1.21
- CAS no.: 9002-06-6

Databases
- BRENDA: enzyme data
- ExPASy: NiceZyme view
- KEGG: enzyme entry
- MetaCyc: metabolic pathway
- Rhea: reactions
- PDB structures: RCSB PDB PDBe PDBsum
- Gene Ontology: AmiGO / QuickGO
Search
- PMC: articles
- PubMed: articles
- NCBI: proteins

Thymidine kinase

Identifiers
- Symbol: TK
- Pfam: PF00265
- Pfam clan: CL0023
- InterPro: IPR001267
- PROSITE: PDOC00524
Available protein structures:
- PDB: 1W4R, 1XBT, 1XX6, 2B8T IPR001267 PF00265 (ECOD; PDBsum)
- AlphaFold: IPR001267; PF00265

Thymidine kinase 1, soluble

Identifiers
- Symbol: TK1
- NCBI gene: 7083
- HGNC: 11830
- OMIM: 188300
- RefSeq: NM_003258
- UniProt: P04183

Other data
- EC number: 2.7.1.21
- Locus: Chr. 17 q23.2-25.3
Search for
- Structures: Swiss-model
- Domains: InterPro

Thymidine kinase 2, mitochondrial

Identifiers
- Symbol: TK2
- NCBI gene: 7084
- HGNC: 11831
- OMIM: 188250
- RefSeq: NM_004614
- UniProt: O00142

Other data
- EC number: 2.7.1.21
- Locus: Chr. 16
Search for
- Structures: Swiss-model
- Domains: InterPro

Thymidine kinase is an enzyme, a phosphotransferase (a kinase): 2'-deoxythymidine kinase, ATP-thymidine 5'-phosphotransferase, EC 2.7.1.21. It can be found in most living cells. It is present in two forms in mammalian cells, TK1 and TK2. Certain viruses also have genetic information for expression of viral thymidine kinases. Thymidine kinase catalyzes the reaction:

Thymidine + ATP → Thymidine 5'-phosphate + ADP

Thymidine kinases have a key function in the synthesis of DNA and therefore in cell division, as they are part of the unique reaction chain to introduce thymidine into the DNA. Thymidine is present in the body fluids as a result of degradation of DNA from food and from dead cells. Thymidine kinase is required for the action of many antiviral drugs. It is used to select hybridoma cell lines in production of monoclonal antibodies. In clinical chemistry it is used as a proliferation marker in the diagnosis, control of treatment and follow-up of malignant disease, mainly of hematological malignancies.

== History ==
The incorporation of thymidine in DNA was demonstrated around 1950. Somewhat later, it was shown that this incorporation was preceded by phosphorylation, and, around 1960, the enzyme responsible was purified and characterized.

== Classification ==
Two different classes of thymidine kinases have been identified and are included in this super family: one family groups together thymidine kinase from herpesvirus as well as cellular thymidylate kinases, the second family groups TK from various sources that include, vertebrates, bacteria, the bacteriophage T4, poxviruses, African swine fever virus (ASFV) and Fish lymphocystis disease virus (FLDV). The major capsid protein of insect iridescent viruses also belongs to this family. The Prosite pattern recognizes only the cellular type of thymidine kinases.

== Isozymes ==
Mammals have two isoenzymes, that are chemically very different, TK1 and TK2. The former was first found in fetal tissue, the second was found to be more abundant in adult tissue, and initially they were termed fetal and adult thymidine kinase. Soon it was shown that TK1 is present in the cytoplasm only in anticipation of cell division (cell cycle-dependent), whereas TK2 is located in mitochondria and is cell cycle-independent. The two isoenzymes have different reaction kinetics and are inhibited by different inhibitors.

The viral thymidine kinases differ completely from the mammalian enzymes both structurally and biochemically and are inhibited by inhibitors that do not inhibit the mammalian enzymes. The genes of the two human isoenzymes were localized in the mid-1970s. The gene for TK1 was cloned and sequenced. The corresponding protein has a molecular weight of about 25 kD. Normally, it occurs in tissue as a dimer with a molecular weight of around 50 kD. It can be activated by ATP. After activation, is a tetramer with a molecular weight around 100 kD. However, the form of enzyme present in the circulation does not correspond to the protein as encoded by the gene: the main fraction of the active enzyme in the circulation has a molecular weight of 730 kD and is probably bound in a complex to other proteins. This complex is more stable and has a higher specific activity than any of the lower molecular weight forms.

Recombinant TK1 cannot be activated and converted to a tetramer in this way, showing that the enzyme occurring in cells has been modified after synthesis.

TK1 is synthesized by the cell during the S phase of cell division. After cell division is completed, TK1 is degraded intracellularly and does not pass to body fluids after normal cell division. There is a feed-back regulation of the action of thymidine kinase in the cell: thymidine triphosphate (TTP), the product of the further phosphorylation of thymidine, acts as an inhibitor to thymidine kinase. This serves to maintain a balanced amount of TTP available for nucleic acid synthesis, not oversaturating the system. 5'-Aminothymidine, a non-toxic analogue of thymidine, interferes with this regulatory mechanism and thereby increases the cytotoxicity of thymidine analogues used as antineoplastic drugs. The reaction kinetics of thymidine and thymidine analogues phosphorylation is complicated and only partly known. The overall phosphorylation of thymidine to thymidine triphosphate does not follow Michaelis-Menten kinetics, and the various phosphates of thymidine and uridine interfere with the phosphorylation of each other. The kinetics of TK from different species differ from each other's and also the different forms from a given species (monomer, dimer, tetramer and serum form) have different kinetic characteristics.

Genes for virus specific thymidine kinases have been identified in Herpes simplex virus, Varicella zoster virus and Epstein-Barr virus.

+ ATP → + ADP

Thymidine reacts with ATP to give thymidine monophosphate and ADP.

== Function ==
Thymidine monophosphate, the product of the reaction catalyzed by thymidine kinase, is in turn phosphorylated to thymidine diphosphate by the enzyme thymidylate kinase and further to thymidine triphosphate by the enzyme nucleoside diphosphate kinase. The triphosphate is included in a DNA molecule, a reaction catalyzed by a DNA polymerase and a complementary DNA molecule (or an RNA molecule in the case of reverse transcriptase, an enzyme present in retrovirus).

Thymidine monophosphate is also produced by the cell in a different reaction by methylation of deoxyuridine monophosphate, a product of other metabolic pathways unrelated to thymidine, by the enzyme thymidylate synthase. The second route is sufficient to supply thymidine monophosphate for DNA repair. When a cell prepares to divide, a complete new set-up of DNA is required, and the requirement for building blocks, including thymidine triphosphate, increases. Cells prepare for cell division by making some of the enzymes required during the division. They are not normally present in the cells and are downregulated and degraded afterwards. Such enzymes are called salvage enzymes. Thymidine kinase 1 is such a salvage enzyme, whereas thymidine kinase 2 and thymidylate synthase are not cell cycle-dependent.

== Deficiency ==
Thymidine kinase 2 is used by the cells for synthesis of mitochondrial DNA. Mutations in the gene for TK2 lead to a myopathic form of mitochondrial DNA depletion syndrome. Another reason for TK 2 deficiency may be oxidative stress induced S-glutathionylation and proteolytic degradation of mitochondrial thymidine kinase 2. No syndrome caused by TK1 deficiency is known, probably as a defective TK1 gene would lead to fetal death.

== Thymidine kinase during development ==
The formation of tetramer after modification of thymidine kinase 1 after synthesis enhances the enzyme activity. It has been suggested that this is a mechanism for regulation of the enzyme activity. The formation of tetramers is observed after the Dictyostelium development stage. Its use for fine regulation of DNA synthesis is suggested to have been established in warm blooded animals after they branched out from the vertebrates. Also the development of thymidine kinase like enzymes in the development has been studied.

== Species distribution ==
Thymidine kinase is present in animals, plants, some bacteria, archeans and virus. The thymidine kinases from pox viruses, African swine fever virus, Herpes simplex virus, Varicella zoster virus and Epstein- Barr virus have been identified and to a varying degree characterized. The enzyme form in virus is different from that in other organisms. Thymidine kinase is not present in fungi.

== Applications ==
=== Identification of dividing cells ===
The first indirect use of thymidine kinase in biochemical research was the identification of dividing cells by incorporation of radiolabeled thymidine and subsequent measurement of the radioactivity or autoradiography to identify the dividing cells. For this purpose tritiated thymidine is included in the growth medium. In spite of errors in the technique, it is still used to determine the growth rate of malignant cells and to study the activation of lymphocytes in immunology.

=== PET scan of active tumors ===
Fluorothymidine is a thymidine analog. Its uptake is regulated by thymidine kinase 1, and it is therefore taken up preferentially by rapidly proliferating tumor tissue. The fluorine isotope 18 is a positron emitter that is used in positron emission tomography (PET). The fluorine-18 radiolabeled fluorothymidine F-18 is therefore useful for PET imaging of active tumor proliferation, and compares favorably with the more commonly used marker fludeoxyglucose (18F). A standardized protocol that will help comparison of clinical studies has been suggested.

=== Selection of hybridomas ===
Hybridomas are cells obtained by fusing tumor cells (which can divide infinitely) and immunoglobulin-producing lymphocytes (plasma cells). Hybridomas can be expanded to produce large quantities of immunoglobulins with a given unique specificity (monoclonal antibodies). One problem is to single out the hybridomas from the large excess of unfused cells after the cell fusion. One common way to solve this is to use thymidine kinase negative (TK−) tumor cell lines for the fusion. The thymidine kinase negative cells are obtained by growing the tumor cell line in the presence of thymidine analogs, that kill the thymidine kinase positive (TK+) cells. The negative cells can then be expanded and used for the fusion with TK+ plasma cells. After fusion, the cells are grown in a medium with methotrexate or aminopterin that inhibit the enzyme dihydrofolate reductase thus blocking the de novo synthesis of thymidine monophosphate. One such medium that is commonly used is HAT medium, which contains hypoxanthine, aminopterin and thymidine. The unfused cells from the thymidine kinase-deficient cell line die because they have no source of thymidine monophosphate. The lymphocytes eventually die because they are not "immortal." Only the hybridomas that have "immortality" from their cell line ancestor and thymidine kinase from the plasma cell survive. Those that produce the desired antibody are then selected and cultured to produce the monoclonal antibody. Hybridoma cells can also be isolated using the same principle as described with respect to another gene the HGPRT, which synthesizes IMP necessary for GMP nucleotide synthesis in the salvage pathway.

=== Study of chromosome structure ===
Molecular combing of DNA fibers can be used to monitor the structure of chromosomes in the budding yeast Saccharomyces cerevisiae. This provides DNA replication profiles of individual molecules. This requires that the yeast strains express thymidine kinase, which wild type yeasts do not, being fungi (see occurrence). Therefore, a gene for thymidine kinase must be incorporated in the genome.

=== Clinical chemistry ===
Thymidine kinase is a salvage enzyme that is only present in anticipation of cell division. The enzyme is not set free from cells undergoing normal division where the cells have a special mechanism to degrade the proteins no longer needed after the cell division. In normal subjects, the amount of thymidine kinase in serum or plasma is therefore very low. Tumor cells release enzyme to the circulation, probably in connection with the disruption of dead or dying tumor cells. The thymidine kinase level in serum therefore serves as a measure of malignant proliferation, indirectly as a measure of the aggressivity of the tumor.

=== Therapeutic applications ===
Some drugs are specifically directed against dividing cells. They can be used against tumors and viral diseases (both against retrovirus and against other virus), as the diseased cells replicate much more frequently than normal cells and also against some non-malignant diseases related to excessively rapid cell replication (for instance psoriasis). It has been suggested that the antiviral and anti-cancer activity of thymidine analogues is, at least partly, achieved by down-regulation of mitochondrial thymidine kinase.

==== Cytostatics ====
There are different classes of drugs directed against thymidine metabolism and thereby involving thymidine kinase that are used to control cancer associated cell division. Chain terminators are thymidine analogues that are included in the growing DNA chain, but modified so that the chain cannot be further elongated. As analogs of thymidine, this type of drugs are readily phosphorylated to 5'-monophosphates. The monophosphate is further phosphorylated to the corresponding triphosphate and incorporated in the growing DNA chain. The analog has been modified so that it does not have the hydroxyl group in the 3'-position that is required for continued chain growth. In zidovudine (AZT; ATC:J05AF01) the 3'-hydroxyl group has been replaced by an azido group, in stavudine (ATC: J05AF04) it has been removed without replacement. AZT is used as substrate in one of the methods for determination of thymidine kinase in serum. This implies that AZT interferes with this method and may be a limitation: AZT is a standard component of HAART therapy in HIV infection. One common consequence of AIDS is lymphoma and the most important diagnostic application of thymidine kinase determination is for monitoring of lymphoma.

Chemical structures of thymidine kinase substrate analogs
AZT

Stavudine

Idoxuridine

Aciclovir

Ganciclovir

Other thymidine analogues, for instance Idoxuridine (ATC: J05AB02) act by blocking base pairing during subsequent replication cycles, thereby making the resulting DNA chain defective. This may also be combined with radioactivity to achieve apoptosis of malignant cells.

==== Antivirals ====
Some antiviral drugs, such as acyclovir (ATC: J05AB01) and ganciclovir (ATC: J05AB06) as well as other nucleoside analogs make use of the substrate specificity of viral thymidine kinase, as opposed to human thymidine kinases. These drugs act as pro-drugs, which in themselves are not toxic, but are converted to toxic drugs by phosphorylation by viral thymidine kinase. Cells infected with the virus therefore produce highly toxic triphosphates that lead to cell death. Human thymidine kinase, in contrast, with its more narrow specificity, is unable to phosphorylate and activate the prodrug. In this way, only cells infected by the virus are susceptible to the drug. Such drugs are effective only against viruses from the herpes group with their specific thymidine kinase. In patients treated with this type of drugs, the development of antiviral drug resistance is frequently observed. Sequencing the thymidine kinase gene in Herpes simplex virus and Varicella zoster virus shows the rapid genetic variability and may facilitate the diagnosis of antiviral drug resistance.

After smallpox was declared eradicated by WHO in December 1979, vaccination programs were terminated. A re-emergence of the disease either by accident or as a result of biological warfare would meet an unprotected population and could result in an epidemic that could be difficult to control. Mass vaccination to combat a smallpox epidemic could be challenging because the only approved smallpox vaccine, Vaccinia Virus, can have severe side effects. Nevertheless, some governments stockpile Smallpox vaccine to insure against the possibility. However, the development of specific and effective antiviral drugs is prioritized. One possible approach would be to use the specificity of the thymidine kinase of poxvirus for the purpose, in a similar way that it is used for drugs against herpesvirus. One difficulty is that the poxvirus thymidine kinase belongs to the same family of thymidine kinases as the human thymidine kinases and thereby is more similar chemically. The structure of poxvirus thymidine kinases has therefore been determined to find potential antiviral drugs. The search has, however, not yet resulted in a usable antiviral drug against poxviruses.

==== As a "suicide gene" in gene therapy ====
The herpesvirus thymidine kinase gene has also been used as a "suicide gene" as a safety system in gene therapy experiments, allowing cells expressing the gene to be killed using ganciclovir. This is desirable in case the recombinant gene causes a mutation leading to uncontrolled cell growth (insertional mutagenesis). The cytotoxic products produced by these modified cells may diffuse to neighboring cells, rendering them similarly susceptible to ganciclovir, a phenomenon known as the "bystander effect." This approach has been used to treat cancer in animal models, and is advantageous in that the tumor may be killed with as few as 10% of malignant cells expressing the gene. A similar system has been tried using tomato thymidine kinase and AZT. In addition, thymidine kinase gene is used as a suicide gene to tackle dangerous graft-versus-host disease in hematopoietic stem cell transplant therapy named Zalmoxis that was conditionally approved in Europe in 2016

==== Tumor marker genes ====
A similar use of the thymidine kinase makes use of the presence in some tumor cells of substances not present in normal cells (tumor markers). Such tumor markers are, for instance, CEA (carcinoembryonic antigen) and AFP (alpha fetoprotein). The genes for these tumor markers may be used as promoter genes for thymidine kinase. Thymidine kinase can then be activated in cells expressing the tumor marker but not in normal cells, such that treatment with ganciclovir kills only the tumor cells. Such gene therapy-based approaches are still experimental, however, as problems associated with targeting the gene transfer to the tumor cells have not yet been completely solved.

==== Neutron capture therapy for tumors ====
Incorporation of a thymidine analogue with boron has been suggested and tried in animal models for boron neutron capture therapy of brain tumors. A very extensive number of thymidine derivatives containing boron have been described.

==== Antiparasitics ====
The protozoan parasite Giardia intestinalis lacks thymidylate synthase and compensates that by having a high-affinity thymidine kinase in order to efficiently use thymidine that it takes up from the surrounding environment. This makes the parasite sensitive to thymidine analogues such as zidovudine (AZT), which when phosphorylated by the enzyme effectively inhibits parasite proliferation in vitro and also looks promising as a antigiardial drug in infected rodents. The short treatment period needed (three days) reduces the risk of side effects as compared to the lengthy treatments when it was commonly used as an anti-HIV drug.

An alternative approach tested in Plasmodium falciparum (causing malaria) is the introduction of a TK gene in the parasite genome. This makes the parasite sensitive to BrdU treatment and also constitutes a sensitive indicator of replication of the parasite genome.

== Measurement ==
=== In serum and plasma ===
Thymidine kinase levels in serum or plasma have been mostly measured using enzyme activity assays. In commercial assays, this is done by incubation of a serum sample with a substrate analog and measurement of the amount of product formed. Direct determination of the thymidine kinase protein by immunoassay has also been used. The amounts of thymidine kinase found by this method does not correlate well with the enzyme activities. One reason for this is that a large amount of serum TK1 identified by immunoassay is not enzymatically active. This is particularly the case with solid tumors where immunoassays may be more sensitive.

=== In tissue ===
Thymidine kinase has been determined in tissue samples after extraction of the tissue. No standard method for the extraction or for the assay has been developed and TK determination in extracts from cells and tissues have not been validated in relation to any specific clinical question, see however Romain et al. and Arnér et al. A method has been developed for specific determination of TK2 in cell extracts using the substrate analog 5-Bromovinyl 2'-deoxyuridine. In the studies referred to below the methods used and the way the results are reported are so different that comparisons between different studies are not possible. The TK1 levels in fetal tissues during development are higher than those of the corresponding tissues later. Certain non-malignant diseases also give rise to dramatic elevation of TK values in cells and tissue: in peripheric lymphocytes during monocytosis and in bone marrow during pernicious anemia. As TK1 is present in cells during cell division, it is reasonable to assume that the TK activity in malignant tissue should be higher than in corresponding normal tissue. This is also confirmed in most studies.

=== Immunohistochemical staining ===
Antibodies against thymidine kinase are available for immunohistochemical detection. Staining for thymidine kinase was found to be a reliable technique for identification of patients with stage 2 breast carcinoma. The highest number of patients identified was obtained by combination of thymidine kinase and Ki-67 staining. The technique has also been validated for lung cancer, for colorectal carcinoma, for lung cancer and for renal cell carcinoma.

=== Fluorescent staining ===
2'-deoxy-2',2'-difluoro-5-ethynyluridine (dF-EdU) binds to Herpes simplex virus thymidine kinase but, because of sterical hindrance, not to human thymidine kinase. This reagent together with a fluorescent azide cause fluorescence of infected cells but not of uninfected cells. Therefore, this substrate analog makes it possible to specifically stain infected cells.

== See also ==
- Thymidine kinase 1
- Thymidine kinase from herpesvirus
- Thymidylate kinase
- Nucleoside-diphosphate kinase
- Thymidylate synthase
- Thymidine kinase in clinical chemistry
- DiviTum(R) TKa test for Thymidine kinase
