= Thymidine kinase in clinical chemistry =

Thymidine kinase is an enzyme, a phosphotransferase (a kinase): 2'-deoxythymidine kinase, ATP-thymidine 5'-phosphotransferase, EC 2.7.1.21 that catalyzes the reaction:

Thd + ATP → TMP + ADP

where Thd is (deoxy)thymidine, ATP is adenosine 5'-triphosphate, TMP is (deoxy)thymidine 5'-phosphate and ADP is adenosine 5'-diphosphate. In clinical chemistry it has been suggested as a proliferation marker for prognosis, verification of diagnosis, control of treatment (particularly as a companion diagnostic) and follow-up of malignant disease. It is used mainly in relation to hematological malignancies but the developments of more sensitive assays have stimulated investigations for its use in relation to solid tumors.

== History ==
The incorporation of thymidine in DNA was demonstrated around 1950. Somewhat later, it was shown that this incorporation was preceded by phosphorylation and around 1960, the enzyme responsible was purified and characterized. The potential use as a tumor marker was suggested by Gronowitz et al.

== Biochemistry ==
Mammals have two isoenzymes that are chemically very different, Thymidine Kinase 1 (TK1) and Thymidine Kinase 2 (TK2). The former was first found in fetal tissue, the second was found to be more abundant in adult tissue, and so initially they were termed fetal and adult thymidine kinases. Soon it was shown that TK1 is present in the cytoplasm only in anticipation of cell division (cell cycle-dependent) whereas the presence of TK2, which is located in the mitochondria, is cell cycle-independent. TK1 is synthesized by the cell during the S phase of cell division. After cell division is completed, TK1 is degraded intracellularly, so that it does not pass into body fluids after normal cell division. The TK enzyme suggested as a tumor marker is the cytosolic cell cycle dependent TK1. It is present during cell division in much higher concentrations than TK2 and it is released in quantities that completely dominate the thymidine kinase activity in blood and other body fluids.

In addition to cellular TKs, virus specific thymidine kinases have been identified in Herpes simplex virus, Varicella zoster virus and Epstein-Barr virus. They differ biochemically from thymidine kinase from mammalian cells and are inhibited by specific inhibitors that do not influence the activity of mammalian thymidine kinases. Determination of viral thymidine kinase has been suggested for confirmation of diagnosis and for control of treatment of viral infections.

+ ATP ---> + ADP

Thymidine reacts with ATP to give thymidine monophosphate and ADP.

== Physiological context ==
Thymidine monophosphate, the product of the reaction catalyzed by thymidine kinase, is in turn phosphorylated to thymidine diphosphate by the enzyme thymidylate kinase and further to thymidine triphosphate by the enzyme nucleoside diphosphate kinase. The triphosphate is included in a DNA molecule, a reaction catalyzed by a DNA polymerase and a complementary DNA molecule (or an RNA molecule in the case of reverse transcriptase, an enzyme present in retrovirus). Thymidine monophosphate is produced by the cell in two different reactions - either by phosphorylation of thymidine as described above or by methylation of deoxyuridine monophosphate, a product of other metabolic pathways unrelated to thymidine, by the enzyme thymidylate synthase (De novo synthesis). This second route is used by the cell under normal conditions, and it is sufficient to supply thymidine monophosphate for DNA repair. When a cell prepares to divide, a complete new set-up of DNA is required, and the requirement for building blocks, including thymidine triphosphate, increases. Cells prepare for cell division by making some of the enzymes required during the division. They are not normally present in the cells and are down-regulated and degraded afterwards. Such enzymes are called salvage enzymes. Thymidine kinase 1 is such a salvage enzyme, whereas thymidine kinase 2 is not cell cycle-dependent.

== Thymidine kinase in serum ==
=== Background ===
Thymidine kinase is a salvage enzyme that is only present in anticipation of cell division. The enzyme is not set free from cells undergoing normal division where the cells have a special mechanism to degrade the proteins no longer needed after cell division is completed. In normal subjects, the amount of thymidine kinase in serum or plasma is, therefore, very low. Tumor cells release enzyme to the circulation, probably in connection with the disruption of dead or dying tumor cells. The thymidine kinase level in serum, therefore, serves as a measure of malignant proliferation and, indirectly, as a measure of the aggressivity of the tumor. The form of enzyme present in the circulation does not correspond to the protein as encoded by the gene: the gene corresponds to a protein with molecular weight around 25 kD. It is a dimer with a molecular weight of around 50 kD, if activated by ATP a tetramer with molecular weight around 100 kD. The main fraction of the active enzyme in the circulation has a molecular weight of 730 kD and is probably bound in a complex to other proteins.

=== Measurement ===
Thymidine kinase 1 (TK1) levels in serum or plasma may be measured based on their enzymatic activity or in terms of mass using immunoassays. In enzyme activity assays, this is done by incubation of a serum sample with a substrate analogue. The oldest commercially available technique uses iodo-deoxyuridine (idoxuridine) wherein a methyl group in thymidine has been replaced with radioactive iodine. This substrate is well accepted by the enzyme. The monophosphate of iodo deoxyuridine is adsorbed on aluminum oxide that is suspended in the incubation medium. After decantation and washing the radioactivity of the aluminum oxide gives a measure of the amount of thymidine kinase in the sample. Kits using this principle are commercially available from the companies Immunotech/Beckman and DiaSorin.

Idoxuridine

A non-radioactive assay method has been developed by the company Dia-Sorin. In this technique 3'-azido-2',3'-deoxythymidine (Zidovudine, AZT) is first phosphorylated to AZT 5'-monophosphate (AZTMP) by the TK1 in the sample. AZTMP is measured in an immunoassay with anti-AZTMP antibodies and AZTMP-labeled peroxidase. The assay runs in a closed system on the laboratory robot from DiaSorin. The DiviTum assay from Biovica International uses another thymidine analogue, bromodeoxyuridine, as substrate to the enzyme. The product of the reaction is further phosphorylated to tri-phosphate and incorporated in DNA-strings of polythymidine. The polythymidine binds to strings of polyadenine coupled to the bottom of the wells in microtiter plates. There it is detected with an ELISA technique: The wells are filled with a solution of a monoclonal antibody to bromo-deoxyuridine. The monoclonal antibody has been bound (conjugated) to the enzyme alkaline phosphatase. After the unbound antibody-conjugate has been washed away, a solution of a substrate to the alkaline phosphatase, para-nitrophenylphosphate, is added. The product of the reaction, para-nitrophenol, is yellow at alkaline pH and can be measured by photometry. This method has been evaluated against the previous radioactive technique. It is considerably more sensitive than the previous enzymatic methods and may be, therefore, more suitable for use with solid tumors where lower elevations of TK1 are found in body fluids. Comparisons of the methods have been published. In the study by Nisman et al., while the Divitum was on the whole more sensitive than the Liaison method, the authors suggested that the Liaison method may have been more sensitive for the TK1 forms found in normal subjects. A continuous and homogeneous fluorescent method based on quenching technology has recently been published. This technique utilizes natural thymidine as substrate and can also determine deoxycytidine kinase simultaneously with TK1.

Immunoassays enabling the direct determination of TK1 protein have now been developed. Immunoassays have advantages over enzyme activity methods in that they can measure TK1 isoforms that are enzymatically inactive plus that they are unaffected by serum TK1 inhibitors. The specific activity of serum TK1 differs between cancer types and using an immunoassay method may aid in comparing TK1 levels between subjects and malignancy types. Due to the basic differences in assay methods, results obtained with TK1 activity assays and immunoassay may differ, e.g. an ELISA based on antibodies against the TK1 TK 210 epitope was shown to be twice as sensitive as a TK1 activity assay in distinguishing between healthy women and subjects with breast cancer

Two immunoassays have been developed against the exposed '210' epitope covering the C-terminal amino acid sequence 194-225, a direct dot-blot assay with chemiluminescence end point and a microtiter sandwich ELISA. The dot-blot assay is a nitrocellulose membrane based assay with a chemiluminsecent substrate utilising a primary chicken IgY antibody and a secondary labeled anti-IgY antibody. In brief, the sample is spotted onto a nitrocellulose membrane where the proteins in the sample bind. After blocking, the membrane is incubated with a primary anti-TK1 antibody which binds to the TK1 on the membrane. After washing, a biotinylated second antibody directed against IgY antibodies is added followed by streptavidin labelled HRP and a chemiluminescent substrate. A microtiter ELISA based on monoclonal antibodies directed against the "210" epitope is available from AroCell. The AroCell TK 210 ELISA system uses a pre-treatment buffer to break up the high molecular weight TK1 complexes and expose the TK 210 epitope. The treated samples are added to a microtiter plate coated with anti TK 210 monoclonal antibodies. After incubating and washing, a second anti-TK 210 antibody labeled with biotin is added. After further washing, the color is developed with streptavidin labelled horse radish peroxidase with TMP as substrate.

A microchip electrophoresis immunoaffinity assay for determination of serum thymidine kinase concentration has been described. Its function was demonstrated using recombinant TK1. It is claimed to be fast and simple to perform.

== Serum thymidine kinase 1 in different malignancies ==
=== Hematologic malignancies ===
The most dramatic increases of serum TK1 are seen in hematologic malignancies. The increases seen in both TK1 activity and concentration are greater in hematologic malignancies compared with solid tumors.

==== Non-Hodgkin lymphoma ====
The main use of serum TK1 activity assays is in non-Hodgkin lymphoma. This disease has a wide range of aggressivity, from slow-growing indolent disease that hardly requires treatment to highly aggressive, rapidly growing forms that should be treated urgently. This is reflected in the values of serum TK1 activity, that range from close to the normal range for slow-growing tumors to very high levels for rapidly growing forms.

==== Leukemias ====
Leukemias normally do not normally present major diagnostic difficulties, as the microscopic analysis of the cells in blood usually provides unequivocal results. TK1 assays, however, may give supplementary information about the aggressivity and the risk for progression.

==== Myeloma ====
Myelomas also often constitute a diagnostic challenge. The malignant cells are often not available for microscopic analysis, and the prognosis is often uncertain. Therefore, information on the prognosis may be essential in the decision of the treatment. Several studies verify the close connection between prognosis and thymidine kinase activity in myelomas.

==== Myelodysplastic syndrome ====
A very interesting case is the myelodysplastic syndrome: some rapidly change to acute leukemia, whereas others remain indolent for very long time. Identification of those tending to change to overt leukemia is important for the treatment. A relationship between the prognosis and the serum TK1 values has been demonstrated in myelodysplastic syndrome .

=== Solid tumors ===
Increased serum TK1 levels may be found in subjects with solid tumors. The increases in serum TK1 activity levels in subjects with solid tumors are not as large as they are for hematologic malignancies. The first methods for determination of serum TK1 activity had a limited sensitivity. In the case of the methods employing radioactivity, one reason was that the quantity of radioactivity allowed by law in normal radioimmunoassay laboratories is strictly limited. The experimental method first developed by Gronowitz et al. used quantities of radioisotope much higher than those used in commercial radioassays and, therefore, the sensitivity was sufficient to detect increases in serum TK1 in subjects with solid tumors. With commercial radioassays this was difficult, and the results were not very convincing. Later, more sensitive, non-radioactive techniques enabled the lower increases from solid tumors to be measured accurately. The lower TK1 concentrations and lower TK1 specific activity found in solid tumors may make TK1 immunoassays more suitable.

==== Lung cancer ====
Lung cancer is one of the commonest malignancies, both by incidence (about 15% for both men and women in USA and in Europe) and by mortality (25% for women and 30% for men). One major reason why the mortality is higher than the incidence is that lung cancer is mostly detected and diagnosed at a late stage. Early detection could reduce the mortality. Another reason is that lung cancer, particularly small cell lung cancer, is very aggressive with very low five-year survival rates.

There are several reports of the utility of TK1 activity measurements in serum in lung cancer. For diagnosis, combination of TK1 immunoassay with other biomarkers may be especially valuable while falls in TK1 concentration following therapy may provide prognostic information.

==== Breast cancer ====
Breast cancer is the commonest cancer in women by incidence (about 25% of cancer cases in USA and Europe) and the second largest by mortality (about 15%). The reason for this difference is the advances during the last decennia in the treatment of breast cancer cases and, above all, the public awareness that has allowed earlier diagnosis. One contributing factor is the widespread use of mammography for early detection, self-examination is another.

Many tumor markers including TK1 are used for the follow-up and detection of recurrences in breast cancer patients. Immunoassays may be more sensitive than enzyme activity assays for detecting the TK1 forms found in the serum of subjects with breast cancer. For diagnosis, combination of TK1 assays with other biomarkers, e.g. CA 15-3, may be especially valuable.

==== Prostate cancer ====
Among men, prostate cancer is by far the commonest cancer form, forming about 25% of the total cancer incidence among men in USA and Europe. The mortality is much lower than would be expected from the incidence, around 10% of the total cancer mortality of men in USA and Europe. A major reason for the lower mortality is that many prostate cancers grow slowly so that the patients do not die from this cancer but from other unrelated reasons.

In the management of prostate cancer, it is, therefore, very important to be able to discriminate between slowly and rapidly growing cancers. Thymidine kinase has been suggested as a supplement to PSA (prostate-specific antigen), the tumor marker most frequently used in prostate cancer. Whereas PSA is considered to give an indication of the tumor mass, thymidine kinase activity indicates the rate of proliferation and the markers thus supplement each other.

==== Other solid tumors ====
TK1 elevations have also been reported in association with many types of solid tumors including kidney cancer, bladder cancer, gastric cancer, liver cancer, neurological cancers, melanoma, ovarian, cervical and esophageal cancers.

=== Non-malignant elevations ===
There are several non-malignant causes for elevation of thymidine kinase in serum including vitamin B12 deficiency, leading to pernicious anemia viral infections (particularly by virus from the herpes group) and wound healing after trauma and operation.

=== Thymidine kinase in domestic animals ===
There are also reports of the use of thymidine kinase as a tumor marker in domestic animals, in horse, in dogs in cats and in cows. Elevations in dogs with bacterial infections have also been reported.

=== Thymidine kinase in tissue ===
Thymidine kinase has been determined in tissue samples after extraction of the tissue and a relation between the results and disease progression has been shown. However, no standard method for the extraction or for the assay has been developed and TK determination in extracts from cells and tissues have not been validated in relation to any specific clinical question, see however Arnér et al. Romain et al. and Alegre et al.

In the studies referred to below the methods used and the way the results are reported are so different that comparisons between different studies are not possible.

The TK1 levels in fetal tissues during development are higher than those of the corresponding tissues later.

Certain non-malignant diseases also give rise to dramatic elevation of TK values in cells and tissue: in peripheral lymphocytes during monocytosis and in bone marrow during pernicious anemia. As TK1 is present in cells during cell division, it is reasonable to assume that the TK activity in malignant tissue should be higher than in corresponding normal tissue. This is also confirmed in most studies: a higher TK activity is found in neoplastic than in normal tissue, in brain tumors, in hematological malignancies, in cancer and polyps in colon, in breast cancer, in lung cancer, in gastric cancers, in ovarian cancer, in mesotheliomas, in melanomas, in thyroid tumors in leukemia and in breast cancer.

Therapy that influences the rate of cell proliferation influences the TK values correspondingly. Although most studies do not show this, it seems probable that differences between samples from healthy tissue and samples from tumor tissue primarily represents changes in the levels of TK1, since this enzyme is much more strongly coupled to cell proliferation than TK2.

A method has been developed for specific determination of TK2 in cell extracts using the substrate analogue 5-Bromovinyl 2'-deoxyuridine.

== Uses of thymidine kinase determinations ==
Tumor markers may be used for the following purposes:

- Screening either for specific cancers or generally for malignant growth. Broad screening for all or most types of cancer was early suggested but has since been shown not to be a realistic goal. Screening for specific cancer types or locations requires a level of specificity and sensitivity that for tumor markers has so far only been reached by PSA. Thymidine kinase neither reaches the clinical sensitivity nor the clinical specificity to be useful for screening purposes, see however Huang et al., Xiang et al. and Cao et al.
- Monitoring of cancer survivors after treatment, detection of recurrent disease is the most common use of tumor markers including thymidine kinase, that is used as a standard methods for monitoring hematological disorders, particularly lymphoma, but is also studied for monitoring solid tumors.
- Diagnosis of specific tumor types. The tumor types that are of interest for thymidine kinase are diagnosed by other techniques than measurement of tumor markers.
- Confirmation of diagnosis to verify the characteristics such as size and aggressivity of a tumor and thereby to help in the evaluation of a suitable treatment schedule has been verified as a suitable application of thymidine kinase determination for several types of tumors. Thymidine kinase has been confirmed as a valuable tool to verify the aggressivity of both hematologic tumors (particularly non-Hodgkin's lymphoma) and prostate carcinoma.
- Staging: thymidine kinase has been suggested for inclusion in the staging criteria for non-Hodgkin's lymphoma
- Prognosis: thymidine kinase has been shown to be an important prognostic parameter particularly in hematologic malignancies (lymphoma and leukemia).
- Verification of the effect of treatment is an important use of thymidine kinase. As this tumor marker reacts to the activity of the tumor rather than to the tumor mass it gives a very early indication of the effect of the treatment.
- A companion diagnostic is used to verify if the treatment is suited for the type or subtype of tumor particularly in personalized medicine. The strong coupling of TK1 expression to the cell cycle provides a special rationale for investigating thymidine kinase as marker of effect of inhibitors to cyclin-dependent kinases. These inhibitor compounds constitute promising new cancer therapies. Cyclin-dependent kinases promote transition through the cell cycle and cyclin-dependent kinase inhibitors are intended to stop the transition to the S phase of the cell cycle, where thymidine kinase is synthesized. Serum TK-activity is therefore now included as a biomarker in clinical trials of these inhibitor compounds.

== See also ==
- Thymidine kinase
- Thymidylate kinase
- Nucleoside diphosphate kinase
- Thymidylate synthase
- Thymidine
