= DTYMK =

Protein-coding gene in humans

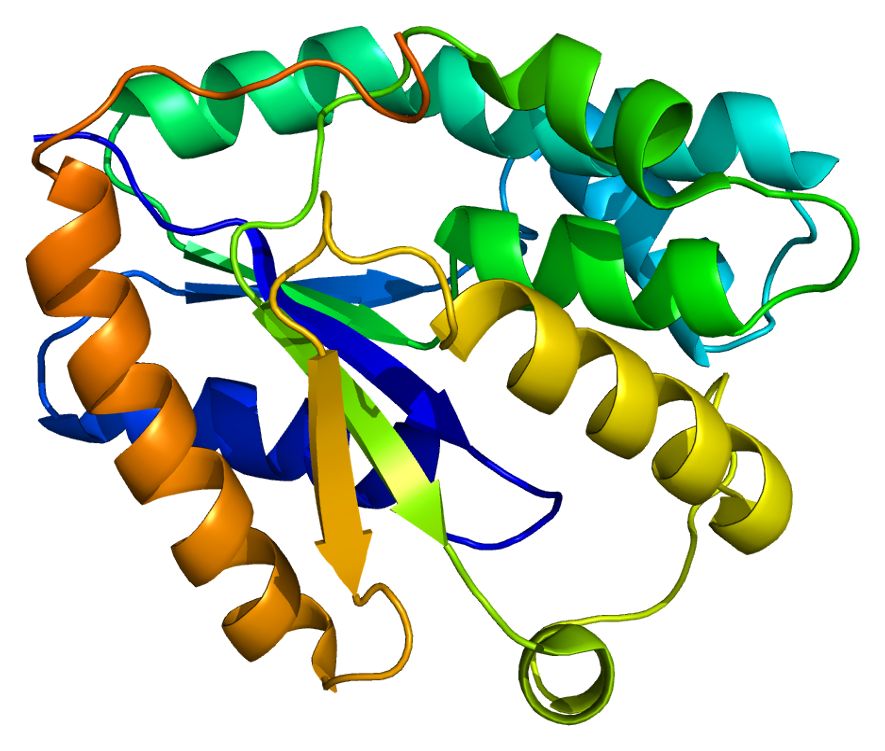

Identifiers
- Aliases: DTYMK, CDC8, PP3731, TMPK, TYMK, deoxythymidylate kinase, CONPM
- External IDs: OMIM: 188345; MGI: 108396; GeneCards: DTYMK
Available structures
PDB	Ortholog search: PDBe RCSB
PDB	List of PDB id codes 1E9F, 1E9E, 1NMY, 1E2G, 1E9D, 1E98, 1E2E, 1NN0, 1E2Q, 1E9C, 1E2F, 1NN5, 1E99, 2XX3, 1NMZ, 1E9A, 1E2D, 1E9B, 1NMX, 1NN1, 1NN3
Enzyme activity
EC #	BRENDA	ExPASy	KEGG	MetaCyc
2.7.4.9	↗	↗	↗	↗

Gene location (Human)
Chr.	Chromosome 2 (human)
Band	2q37.3	Start	241,675,747 bp
Band	2q37.3	End	241,686,944 bp

Gene location (Mouse)
Chr.	Chromosome 1 (mouse)
Band	1 D|1 47.34 cM	Start	93,720,298 bp
Band	1 D|1 47.34 cM	End	93,729,656 bp
RNA expression pattern
Bgee	Human / Mouse (ortholog); Top expressed in: ventricular zone; gonad; mucosa of transverse colon; ganglionic eminence; stromal cell of endometrium; right adrenal gland; apex of heart; granulocyte; right adrenal cortex; right hemisphere of cerebellum / Top expressed in: endocardial cushion; renal corpuscle; primitive streak; medullary collecting duct; Paneth cell; ureter; embryo; ventricular zone; condyle; embryo; More reference expression data
BioGPS	n/a
Gene ontology
Molecular function	transferase activity; nucleotide binding; uridylate kinase activity; kinase activity; thymidylate kinase activity; nucleoside monophosphate kinase activity; ATP binding; nucleoside diphosphate kinase activity
Cellular component	mitochondrial intermembrane space; mitochondrial matrix; cytoplasm; mitochondrion; cytosol; nucleus
Biological process	nucleobase-containing small molecule interconversion; nucleotide biosynthetic process; response to cadmium ion; phosphorylation; cellular response to growth factor stimulus; dTTP biosynthetic process; response to estrogen; dTDP biosynthetic process; dUDP biosynthetic process; myoblast differentiation; cell population proliferation; nucleoside monophosphate phosphorylation; nucleotide phosphorylation; nucleoside diphosphate phosphorylation; thymidine biosynthetic process
Sources:Amigo / QuickGO
Orthologs
Databases	NCBI: entry; OMA: entry
Species	Human	Mouse
Entrez	1841	21915
Ensembl	ENSG00000168393	ENSMUSG00000026281
UniProt	P23919	P97930
RefSeq (mRNA)	NM_001165031; NM_012145; NM_001320902; NM_001320903; NM_001320904 NM_001320905	NM_001105667; NM_023136
RefSeq (protein)	NP_001158503; NP_001307831; NP_001307832; NP_001307833; NP_001307834 NP_036277	NP_001099137; NP_075625
Location (UCSC)	Chr 2: 241.68 – 241.69 Mb	Chr 1: 93.72 – 93.73 Mb
PubMed search
- Wikidata
View/Edit Human	View/Edit Mouse

Thymidylate kinase also known as deoxythymidylate kinase or dTMP kinase is an enzyme that in humans is encoded by the DTYMK gene. and belongs to thymidylate kinase family of proteins.
