= Thymidylate synthase =

Enzyme

TYMS
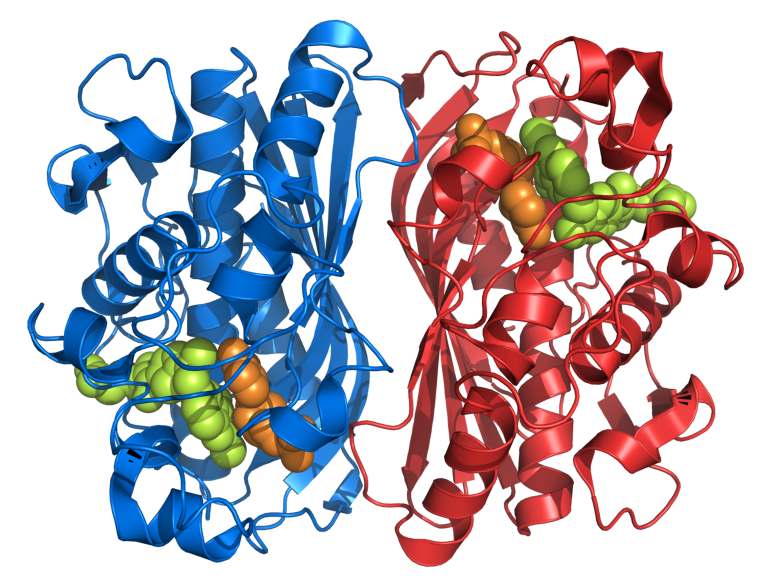

Identifiers
- Aliases: TYMS, HST422, TMS, TS, thymidylate synthetase
- External IDs: OMIM: 188350; MGI: 98878; GeneCards: TYMS
Available structures
PDB	Ortholog search: PDBe RCSB
PDB	List of PDB id codes 1YPV, 1JU6, 2RDA, 3EF9, 3ED7, 1HW3, 3EHI, 3GH0, 4JEF, 4O1X, 1HZW, 3EAW, 3OB7, 3EBU, 4KPW, 3EGY, 3EJL, 3N5G, 3N5E, 1HVY, 4GD7, 4G2O, 4H1I, 2ONB, 3H9K, 4GYH, 3HB8, 1I00, 3GG5, 4FGT, 2RD8, 3EDW, 4G6W, 1HW4, 3GH2, 4E28, 1JUJ, 4O1U, 4UP1, 5HS3,%%s1HW3, 1YPV, 4GD7, 2ONB
Enzyme activity
EC #	BRENDA	ExPASy	KEGG	MetaCyc
2.1.1.45	↗	↗	↗	↗

Gene location (Human)
Chr.	Chromosome 18 (human)
Band	18p11.32	Start	657,653 bp
Band	18p11.32	End	673,578 bp

Gene location (Mouse)
Chr.	Chromosome 5 (mouse)
Band	5 B1|5 15.81 cM	Start	30,263,200 bp
Band	5 B1|5 15.81 cM	End	30,278,615 bp
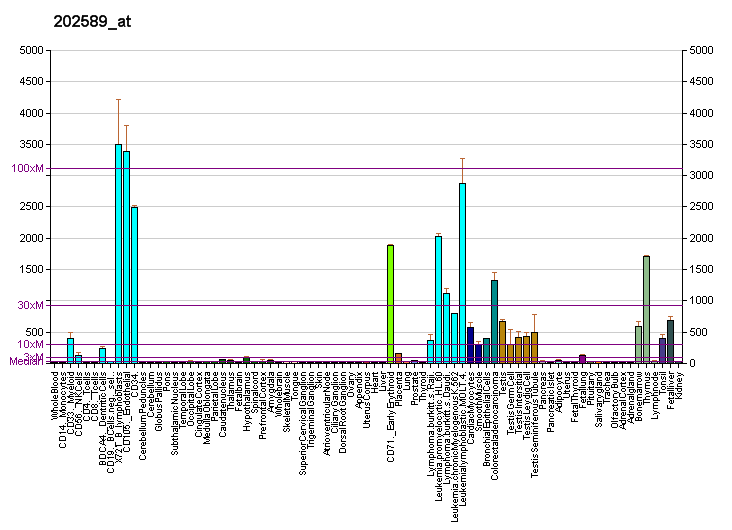
RNA expression pattern
Bgee	Human / Mouse (ortholog); Top expressed in: ventricular zone; embryo; trabecular bone; ganglionic eminence; secondary oocyte; bone marrow; cartilage tissue; mucosa of transverse colon; left testis; right testis / Top expressed in: morula; tail of embryo; genital tubercle; embryo; embryo; ventricular zone; blastocyst; yolk sac; zygote; right kidney; More reference expression data
BioGPS	More reference expression data
Gene ontology
Molecular function	methyltransferase activity; transferase activity; nucleotide binding; protein homodimerization activity; folic acid binding; thymidylate synthase activity; mRNA binding; translation repressor activity, mRNA regulatory element binding; sequence-specific mRNA binding
Cellular component	cytoplasm; cytosol; membrane; mitochondrial matrix; nucleolus; mitochondrion; mitochondrial inner membrane; nucleus
Biological process	response to cytokine; nucleotide biosynthetic process; DNA biosynthetic process; response to organic cyclic compound; response to progesterone; tetrahydrofolate interconversion; ageing; response to glucocorticoid; regulation of transcription involved in G1/S transition of mitotic cell cycle; dTTP biosynthetic process; tetrahydrofolate metabolic process; response to vitamin A; cartilage development; methylation; developmental growth; response to organophosphorus; circadian rhythm; uracil metabolic process; dTMP biosynthetic process; intestinal epithelial cell maturation; dUMP metabolic process; response to folic acid; response to ethanol; response to toxic substance; pyrimidine nucleobase metabolic process; regulation of translation; liver regeneration; nucleobase-containing small molecule interconversion; negative regulation of translation
Sources:Amigo / QuickGO
Orthologs
Databases	NCBI: entry; OMA: entry
Species	Human	Mouse
Entrez	7298	22171
Ensembl	ENSG00000176890	ENSMUSG00000025747
UniProt	P04818; Q53Y97	P07607
RefSeq (mRNA)	NM_001071; NM_001354867; NM_001354868	NM_021288
RefSeq (protein)	NP_001062; NP_001341796; NP_001341797; NP_001062.1	NP_067263
Location (UCSC)	Chr 18: 0.66 – 0.67 Mb	Chr 5: 30.26 – 30.28 Mb
PubMed search
- Wikidata
View/Edit Human	View/Edit Mouse

thymidylate synthase
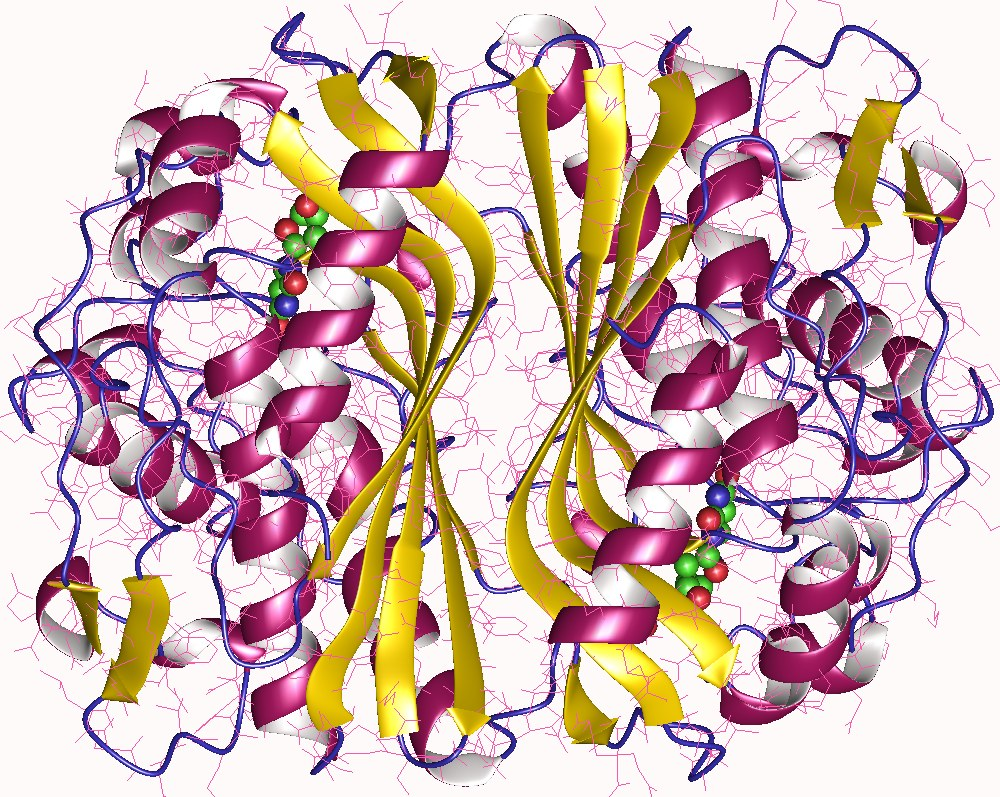
- Thymidylate synthase homodimer, Human

Identifiers
- EC no.: 2.1.1.45
- CAS no.: 9031-61-2

Databases
- BRENDA: enzyme data
- ExPASy: NiceZyme view
- KEGG: enzyme entry
- MetaCyc: metabolic pathway
- Rhea: reactions
- PDB structures: RCSB PDB PDBe PDBsum
- Gene Ontology: AmiGO / QuickGO
Search
- PMC: articles
- PubMed: articles
- NCBI: proteins

Thymidylate synthase

Identifiers
- Symbol: Thymidylat_synt
- Pfam: PF00303
- InterPro: IPR000398
- PROSITE: PDOC00086
- SCOP2: 1tys / SCOPe / SUPFAM
Available protein structures:
- PDB: IPR000398 PF00303 (ECOD; PDBsum)
- AlphaFold: IPR000398; PF00303

Thymidylate synthase (TS) (EC 2.1.1.45) is an enzyme that catalyzes the conversion of deoxyuridine monophosphate (dUMP) to deoxythymidine monophosphate (dTMP). Thymidine is one of the nucleotides in DNA. With inhibition of TS, an imbalance of deoxynucleotides and increased levels of dUMP arise. Both cause DNA damage.

== Function ==
The following reaction is catalyzed by thymidylate synthase:

5,10-methylenetetrahydrofolate + dUMP $\rightleftharpoons$ dihydrofolate + dTMP

By means of reductive methylation, deoxyuridine monophosphate (dUMP) and N5,N10-methylene tetrahydrofolate are together used to form dTMP, yielding dihydrofolate as a secondary product.

This provides the sole de novo pathway for production of dTMP and is the only enzyme in folate metabolism in which the 5,10-methylenetetrahydrofolate is oxidised during one-carbon transfer. The enzyme is essential for regulating the balanced supply of the 4 DNA precursors in normal DNA replication: defects in the enzyme activity affecting the regulation process cause various biological and genetic abnormalities, such as thymineless death. The enzyme is an important target for certain chemotherapeutic drugs. Thymidylate synthase is an enzyme of about 30 to 35 kDa in most species except in protozoan and plants where it exists as a bifunctional enzyme that includes a dihydrofolate reductase domain. A cysteine residue is involved in the catalytic mechanism (it covalently binds the 5,6-dihydro-dUMP intermediate). The sequence around the active site of this enzyme is conserved from phages to vertebrates.

== Enzymatic mechanism ==
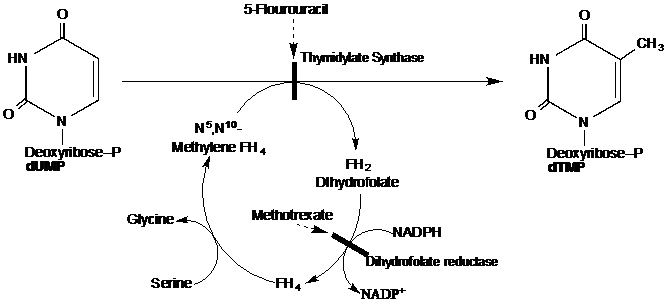
This shows the overall pathway that thymidylate synthase and its intermediates take

In the proposed mechanism, TS forms a covalent bond to the substrate dUMP through a 1,4-addition involving a cysteine nucleophile. The substrate tetrahydrofolate donates a methyl group to the alpha carbon while reducing the new methyl on dUMP to form dTMP.

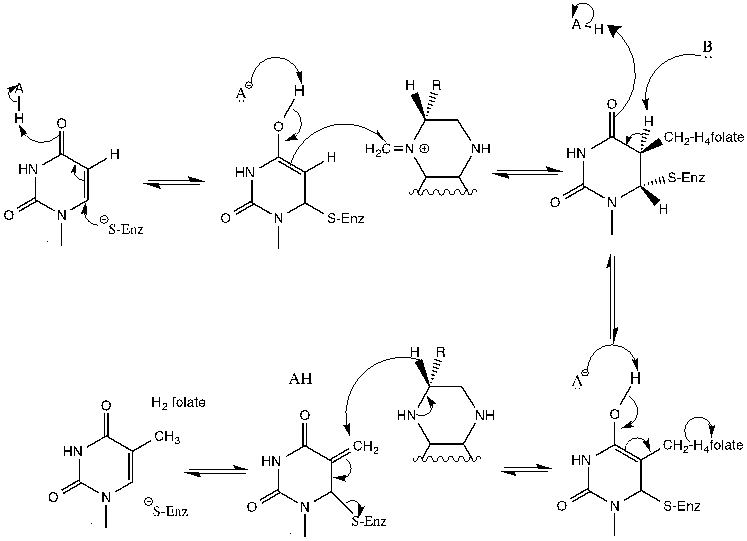
This shows the intricate interactions of the UMP in the active site of thymidylate synthase.

It has been proven that the imine formed through reaction with THF and dUMP is an intermediate in the reaction with dUMP through mutations in the structure of TS that inhibit the completion of the mechanism. V316Am TS, a mutant with deletion of C terminal valines from both subunits, allows the catalysis of dehalogenation of BrdUMP preceding the mechanism described above and the covalent bond to THF and dUMP. The mutant TS is unable to accomplish the C-terminal conformational change needed to break covalent bonds to form dTMP, thus showing the proposed mechanism to be true. The structure was deduced through x-ray crystallography of V316Am TS to illustrate full homodimer TS structure (Figure 1). In addition, it showed possible interactions of the 175Arg and 174Arg between dimers. These arginines are thought to stabilize the UMP structures within the active sites by creating hydrogen bonds to the phosphate group (Figure 2). [Stroud and Finer-Moore]

5-Fluorouracil (5-FU) is an inhibitor of TS. In the cell, 5-FU is converted to a variety of active metabolites, including FdUMP. FdUMP differs from dUMP by a fluorine in place of a hydrogen on the carbon 5 (C-5) of the uracil ring. In the TS active site, a cysteine residue attacks the C-6 of FdUMP. This forms of a nucleophilic C-5 which attacks the methylene group of the tetrahydrofolate. In normal dUMP processing, an active site base abstracts the C-5 proton to drive beta elimination. But, due to fluorine's high electronegativity and strong C-F bond strength, the base cannot abstract a positive fluorine ion from FdUMP. TS remains locked in this stable ternary complex and halts dTMP synthesis.

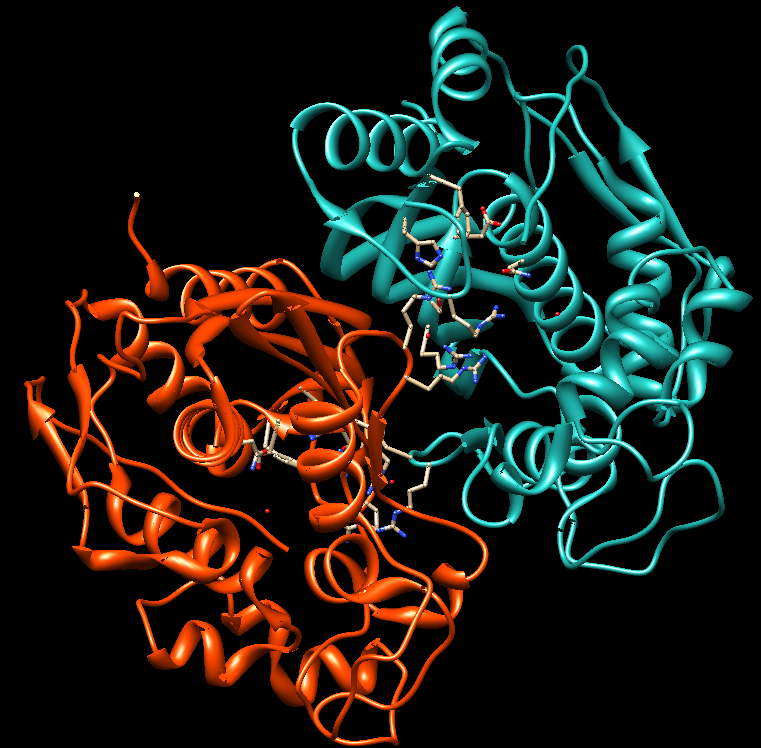
Thymidylate synthase as a homodimer

Figure 1. This figure depicts the homodimer that is TS. As you can see the orange and teal backbones never connect or intertwine, but there are side chains interactions between the dimers. On the orange protein, you can visibly detect two long side chains that enter the teal protein (this is located within the yellow circle). The other beige parts are side chains that interact within the active site. Just below the yellow circle, you are able to see the same pattern of side chains and configuration.

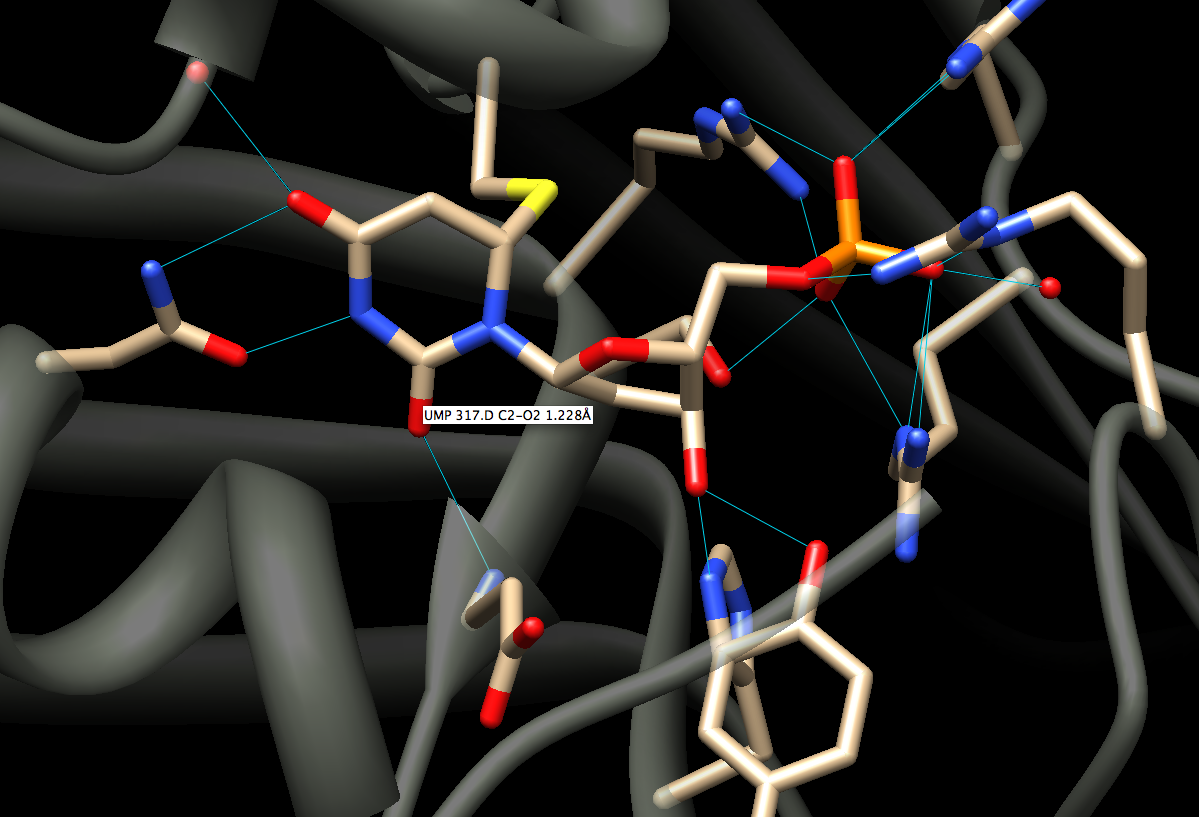
Active site of Thymidylate Synthase

Figure 2. This figure shows the possible H-bond interactions between the arginines and the UMP in the active site of thymidylate synthase. This can be seen by the faint lines between the blue tips and the red tips. These arginines are used to hold the position of the UMP molecule so that the interaction may occur correctly. The two arginines in the top right corner that are located next to each other on the back bone are actually from the other protein of this dimer enzyme. This interaction is one of the many intermolecular forces that holds these two tertiary structures together. The yellow stand in the top-middle region shows a sulfur bond that forms between a cysteine side chain and UMP. This covalently holds the UMP within the active site until it is reacted to yield TMP.

== Clinical significance ==
Thymidylate synthase (TS) plays a crucial role in the early stages of DNA biosynthesis. DNA damage or deletion occur on a daily basis as a result of both endogenous and environmental factors. Such environmental factors include ultraviolet damage and cigarette smoke that contain a variety of carcinogens. Therefore, synthesis and insertion of healthy DNA is vital for normal body functions and avoidance of cancerous activity. In addition, inhibition in synthesis of important nucleotides necessary for cell growth is important. For this reason, TS has become an important target for cancer treatment by means of chemotherapy. The sensitivity of TS to succumb to TS inhibitors is a key part to its success as treatment for colorectal, pancreatic, ovarian, gastric, and breast cancers.

=== Cancer ===
Thymidylate synthase is induced by a transcription factor LSF/TFCP2 and LSF is an oncogene in hepatocellular carcinoma. LSF and Thymidylate synthase plays significant role in Liver Cancer proliferation and progression and Drug resistance.

=== As a drug target ===
The use of TS inhibitors has become a main focus of using TS as a drug target. The most widely used inhibitor is 5-fluorouracil (5-FU) and its metabolized form 5-fluorodeoxyuridine monophosphate (5-FdUMP), which acts as an antimetabolite that irreversibly inhibits TS by competitive binding. However, due to a low level of 5-FU found in many patients, it has been discovered that in combination with leucovorin (LV), 5-FU has greater success in down regulating tumor progression mechanisms and increasing immune system activity.

Experimentally, it has been shown that low levels of TS expression leads to a better response to 5-FU and higher success rates and survival of colon and liver cancer patients. However, additional experiments have merely stated that levels of TS may be associated with stage of disease, cell proliferation and tumor differentiation for those with lung adenocarcinoma but low levels are not necessarily indicators of high success. Expression levels of TS mRNA may be helpful in predicting the malignant potential of certain cancerous cells, thus improving cancer treatment targets and yielding higher survival rates among cancer patients [Hashimoto].

TS's relation to the cell cycle also contributes to its use in cancer treatment. Several cell-cycle dependent kinases and transcription factors influence TS levels in the cell cycle that increase its activity during the S phase but decrease its activity while cells are no longer proliferating. In an auto-regulatory manner, TS not only controls its own translation but that of other proteins such as p53 that through mutation is the root of much tumor growth. Through its translation, TS has a varying expression in cancer cells and tumors, which leads to early cell death.

== Interactive pathway map ==
Click on genes, proteins and metabolites below to link to respective articles. (Note: The interactive pathway map can be edited at WikiPathways: "FluoropyrimidineActivity_WP1601".)

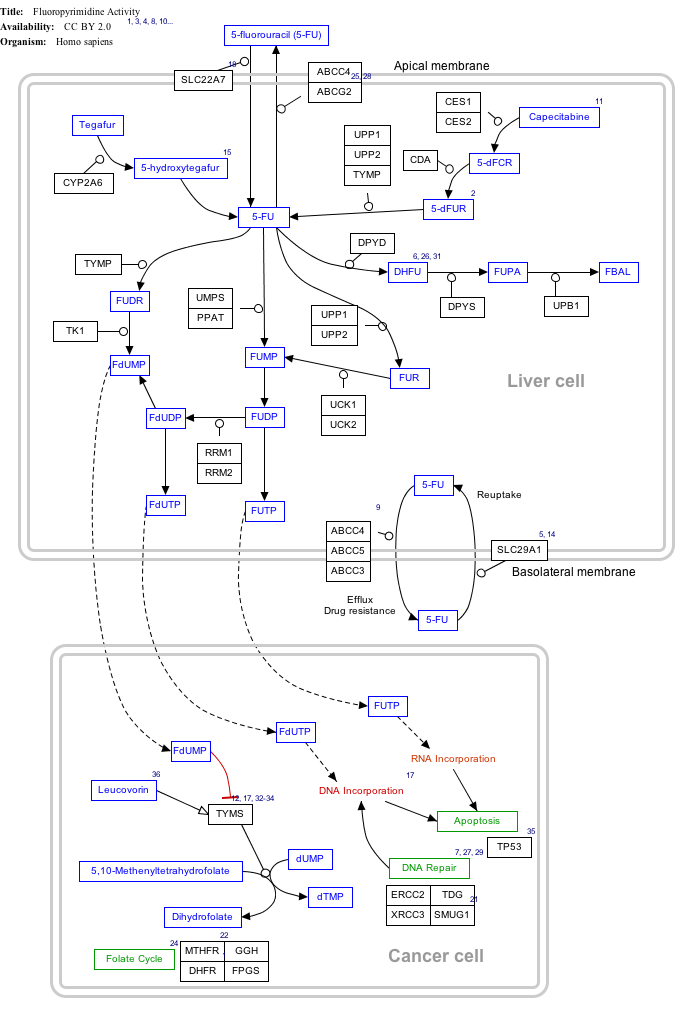

Fluorouracil (5-FU) Activity edit

== See also ==
- Pyrimidine analogues
- Thymidylate synthase inhibitor
- Thymidine kinase
- Thymidine kinase in clinical chemistry
- Thymidylate kinase
