= Finite Legendre transform =

The finite Legendre transform (fLT) transforms a mathematical function defined on the finite interval into its Legendre spectrum. Conversely, the inverse fLT (ifLT) reconstructs the original function from the components of the Legendre spectrum and the Legendre polynomials, which are orthogonal on the interval [−1,1]. Specifically, assume a function x(t) to be defined on an interval [−1,1] and discretized into N equidistant points on this interval. The fLT then yields the decomposition of x(t) into its spectral Legendre components,

$$L_x (k) = \frac{2k+1}{N}\sum_{t=-1}^{t=1}x(t)P_k(t),$$

where the factor (2k + 1)/N serves as normalization factor and L_{x}(k) gives the contribution of the k-th Legendre polynomial to x(t) such that (ifLT)

$$x(t) = \sum_k L_x(k) P_k(t).$$

The fLT should not be confused with the Legendre transform or Legendre transformation used in thermodynamics and quantum physics.

== Legendre filter ==
The fLT of a noisy experimental outcome s(t) and the subsequent application of the inverse fLT (ifLT) on an appropriately truncated Legendre spectrum of s(t) gives a smoothed version of s(t). The fLT and incomplete ifLT thus act as a filter. In contrast to the common Fourier low-pass filter which transmits low frequency harmonics and filters out high frequency harmonics, the Legendre lowpass transmits signal components proportional to low degree Legendre polynomials, while signal components proportional to higher degree Legendre polynomials are filtered out.
