= Thymidine kinase 1 =

Human protein and coding gene

TK1
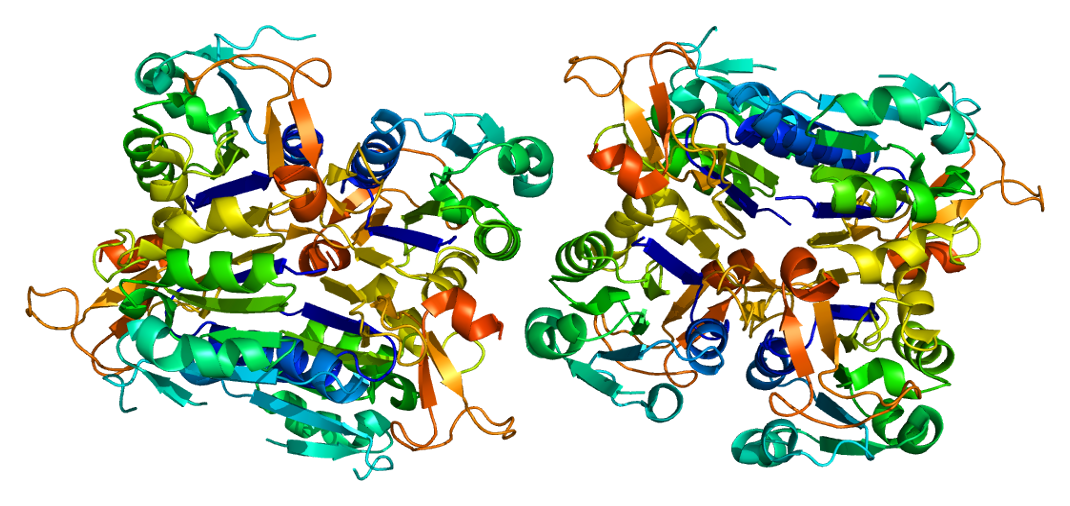

Identifiers
- Aliases: TK1, TK2, Thymidine kinase 1
- External IDs: OMIM: 188300; MGI: 98763; GeneCards: TK1
Available structures
PDB	Ortholog search: PDBe RCSB
PDB	List of PDB id codes 1W4R, 1XBT, 2ORV, 2WVJ
Enzyme activity
EC #	BRENDA	ExPASy	KEGG	MetaCyc
2.7.1.21	↗	↗	↗	↗

Gene location (Human)
Chr.	Chromosome 17 (human)
Band	17q25.3	Start	78,174,091 bp
Band	17q25.3	End	78,187,233 bp

Gene location (Mouse)
Chr.	Chromosome 11 (mouse)
Band	11 E2|11 82.96 cM	Start	117,706,352 bp
Band	11 E2|11 82.96 cM	End	117,716,918 bp
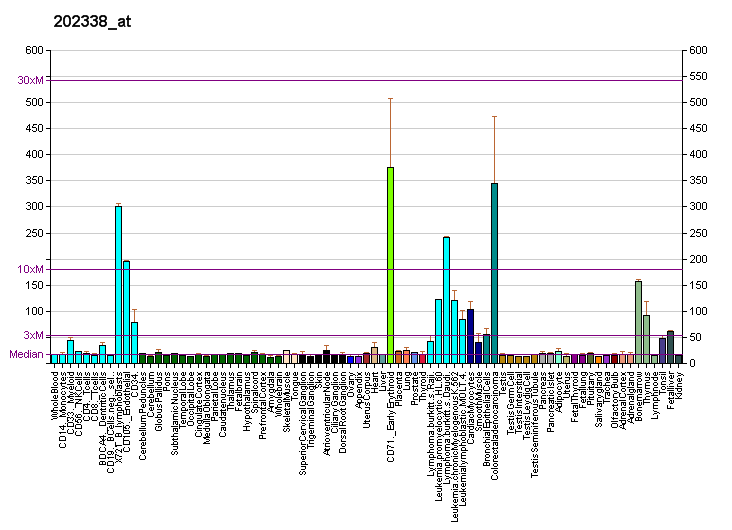
RNA expression pattern
Bgee	Human / Mouse (ortholog); Top expressed in: mucosa of transverse colon; gonad; stromal cell of endometrium; mucosa of esophagus; ventricular zone; bone marrow; ganglionic eminence; rectum; bone marrow cell; oral cavity / Top expressed in: blastocyst; fetal liver hematopoietic progenitor cell; morula; ventricular zone; otic vesicle; tibiofemoral joint; mandibular prominence; maxillary prominence; dermis; otic placode; More reference expression data
BioGPS	More reference expression data
Gene ontology
Molecular function	transferase activity; nucleotide binding; nucleoside kinase activity; zinc ion binding; metal ion binding; kinase activity; protein binding; identical protein binding; ATP binding; thymidine kinase; thymidine kinase activity
Cellular component	cytoplasm; cytosol
Biological process	DNA biosynthetic process; phosphorylation; pyrimidine nucleoside salvage; nucleobase-containing compound metabolic process; protein homotetramerization; deoxyribonucleoside monophosphate biosynthetic process; DNA metabolic process; nucleotide biosynthetic process; thymidine metabolic process
Sources:Amigo / QuickGO
Orthologs
Databases	NCBI: entry; OMA: entry
Species	Human	Mouse
Entrez	7083	21877
Ensembl	ENSG00000167900	ENSMUSG00000025574
UniProt	P04183	P04184
RefSeq (mRNA)	NM_003258; NM_001346663; NM_001363848	NM_001271729; NM_009387
RefSeq (protein)	NP_001333592; NP_003249; NP_001350777	NP_001258658; NP_033413
Location (UCSC)	Chr 17: 78.17 – 78.19 Mb	Chr 11: 117.71 – 117.72 Mb
PubMed search
- Wikidata
View/Edit Human	View/Edit Mouse

Thymidine kinase 1, soluble (gene name TK1), is a human thymidine kinase.

Two forms of this protein have been identified in animal cells, one in cytosol and one in mitochondria. Activity of the cytosolic enzyme is high in proliferating cells and peaks during the S-phase of the cell cycle; it is very low in resting cells.

== Interactions ==
Thymidine kinase 1 has been shown to interact with P21.

== Interactive pathway map ==
Click on genes, proteins and metabolites below to link to respective articles. (Note: The interactive pathway map can be edited at WikiPathways: "FluoropyrimidineActivity_WP1601".)

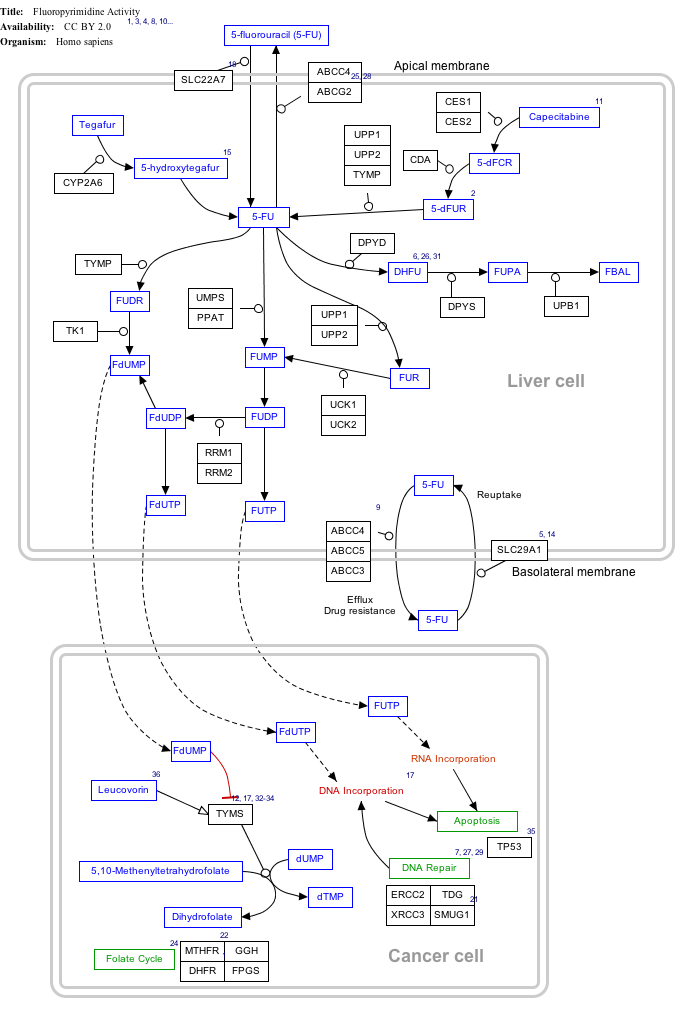

Fluorouracil (5-FU) Activity edit

== Thymidine Kinase 1 in Cancer ==
Elevations in serum TK-1 have been found to correlate with the return of breast and other forms of cancer TK-1 can be used to detect cancer earlier, determine what stage it is in, and detect recurrence. Thymidine kinase 1 can be measured based on its enzyme activity or using immunoassay.
