= Thymidylate kinase =

thymidylate kinase
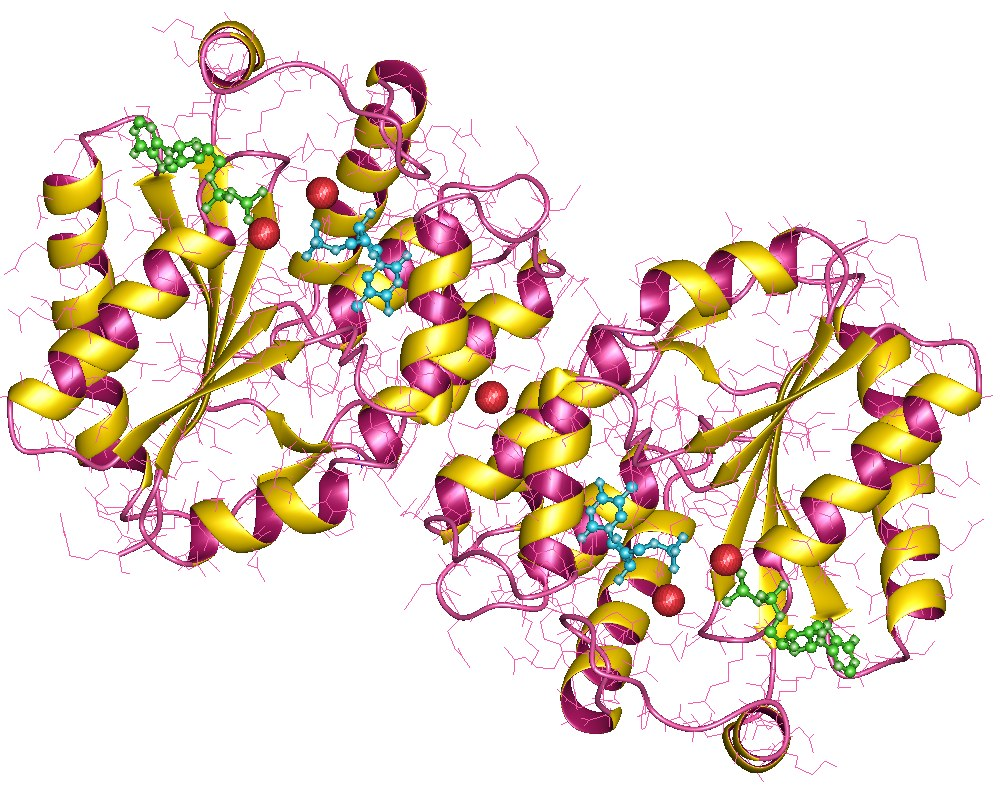
- Thymidylate kinase dimer, Human

Identifiers
- EC no.: 2.7.4.9

Databases
- BRENDA: enzyme data
- ExPASy: NiceZyme view
- KEGG: enzyme entry
- MetaCyc: metabolic pathway
- Rhea: reactions
- PDB structures: RCSB PDB PDBe PDBsum
- Gene Ontology: AmiGO / QuickGO
Search
- PMC: articles
- PubMed: articles
- NCBI: proteins

Thymidylate kinase

Identifiers
- Symbol: Thymidylate_kin
- Pfam: PF02223
- InterPro: IPR000062
- PROSITE: PDOC01034
Available protein structures:
- PDB: PDB: 1e2d PDB: 1e2e PDB: 1e2f PDB: 1e2g PDB: 1e2q PDB: 1e98 PDB: 1e99 PDB: 1e9a PDB: 1e9b PDB: 1e9c IPR000062 PF02223 (ECOD; PDBsum)
- AlphaFold: IPR000062; PF02223

Thymidylate kinase (EC 2.7.4.9; dTMP kinase) catalyzes the phosphorylation of thymidine monophosphate (dTMP) to form thymidine diphosphate (dTDP) by transferring a phosphate group from the cofactor, adenosine triphosphate (ATP), which is converted to adenosine diphosphate (ADP):

thymidine monophosphate
ATP
ADP
ATP
ADP
thymidine diphosphate

The enzyme characterised from Escherichia coli and mouse hepatoma requires magnesium ion Mg^{2+}.

Thymidylate kinase is a ubiquitous enzyme of about 25 Kd and is important in the dTTP synthesis pathway for DNA synthesis. The function of dTMP kinase in eukaryotes comes from the study of a cell cycle mutant, cdc8, in Saccharomyces cerevisiae. Structural and functional analyses suggest that the cDNA codes for authentic human dTMP kinase. The mRNA levels and enzyme activities corresponded to cell cycle progression and cell growth stages.

Thymidylate kinase's subfamily is predicted thymidylate kinase, TKRP1. InterPro: IPR014505

Human protein DTYMK contains this domain.

== Structural studies ==
As of late 2007, 40 structures have been solved for this class of enzymes, with PDB accession codes PDB: 1E2D, PDB: 1E2E, PDB: 1E2F, PDB: 1E2G, PDB: 1E2Q, PDB: 1E98, PDB: 1E99, PDB: 1E9A, PDB: 1E9B, PDB: 1E9C, PDB: 1E9D, PDB: 1E9E, PDB: 1E9F, PDB: 1G3U, PDB: 1GSI, PDB: 1GTV, PDB: 1MRN, PDB: 1MRS, PDB: 1N5I, PDB: 1N5J, PDB: 1N5K, PDB: 1N5L, PDB: 1NMX, PDB: 1NMY, PDB: 1NMZ, PDB: 1NN0, PDB: 1NN1, PDB: 1NN3, PDB: 1NN5, PDB: 1TMK, PDB: 1W2G, PDB: 1W2H, PDB: 2CCG, PDB: 2CCJ, PDB: 2CCK, PDB: 2PBR, PDB: 2TMK, PDB: 3TMK, PDB: 4TMK, and PDB: 5TMP.

== See also ==
- Thymidine kinase
- Thymidylate synthase
- Thymidine kinase in clinical chemistry
