= Alovudine =

Chemical compound

Clinical data
- Other names: Fluorothymidine
- ATC code: none

Identifiers
- CAS Number: 25526-93-6
- PubChem CID: 33039
- ChemSpider: 30578
- UNII: PG53R0DWDQ
- KEGG: D02830
- ChEMBL: ChEMBL105318
- CompTox Dashboard (EPA): DTXSID4046579

Chemical and physical data
- Formula: C_{10}H_{13}FN_{2}O_{4}
- Molar mass: 244.222 g·mol^{−1}
- 3D model (JSmol): Interactive image
- SMILES: O=C/1NC(=O)N(\C=C\1C)[C@@H]2O[C@@H]([C@@H](F)C2)CO
- InChI: InChI=1S/C10H13FN2O4/c1-5-3-13(10(16)12-9(5)15)8-2-6(11)7(4-14)17-8/h3,6-8,14H,2,4H2,1H3,(H,12,15,16)/t6-,7+,8+/m0/s1; Key:UXCAQJAQSWSNPQ-XLPZGREQSA-N

Alovudine (fluorothymidine) is an antiviral agent which was being developed by Medivir. It was discontinued after a Phase II trial in 2005 due to toxicity. It is a DNA polymerase inhibitor.

== See also ==
- Fluorothymidine F-18, an isotopically enriched version of alovudine used as a PET tracer
