= Nucleotide kinase =

A nucleotide kinase is any kinase taking a nucleotide reactant. It may mean:

- Nucleoside-phosphate kinase, EC 2.7.4.4
- Nucleoside-diphosphate kinase, EC 2.7.4.6
- (deoxy)nucleoside-phosphate kinase, EC 2.7.4.10
- Nucleoside-triphosphate—adenylate kinase, EC 2.7.4.13
- Cytidylate kinase, EC 2.7.4.14
