= Walker motifs =

ATP-binding protein sequence motifs

P-loop containing nucleoside triphosphate hydrolase

Identifiers
- Symbol: ?
- InterPro: IPR027417

The Walker A and Walker B motifs are protein sequence motifs, known to have highly conserved three-dimensional structures. These were first reported in ATP-binding proteins by Walker and co-workers in 1982.

Of the two motifs, the A motif is the main "P-loop" responsible for binding phosphate, while the B motif is a much less conserved downstream region. The P-loop is best known for its presence in ATP- and GTP-binding proteins, and is also found in a variety of proteins with phosphorylated substrates. Major lineages include:

- RecA and rotor ATP synthase / ATPases (α and β subunits).
- Nucleic acid-dependent ATPases: helicases, Swi2, and PhoH (InterPro: IPR003714)
- AAA proteins
- STAND NTPases including MJ, PH, AP, and NACHT ATPases
- ABC-PilT ATPases
- Nucleotide kinases (InterPro: IPR000850)
- G domain proteins: G-proteins (transducin), myosin.

== Walker A motif ==
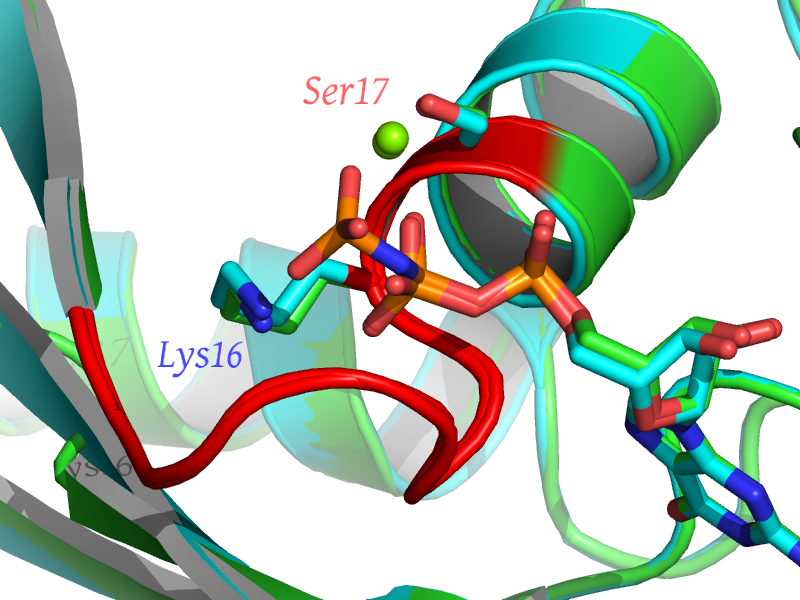
Alignment of the H-Ras mutant A59G mutants in complex with GppNHp (green cartoon) and GDP (cyan cartoon). The P-loop main chain is shown in red, the Mg^{2+} ion as green sphere and the side chains of the amino acids K16 and S17 are shown as sticks.

Walker A motif, also known as the Walker loop, or P-loop, or phosphate-binding loop, is a motif in proteins that is associated with phosphate binding. The motif has the pattern G-x(4)-GK-[TS], where G, K, T and S denote glycine, lysine, threonine and serine residues respectively, and x denotes any amino acid. It is present in many ATP or GTP utilizing proteins; it is the β phosphate of the nucleotide that is bound. The lysine (K) residue in the Walker A motif, together with the main chain NH atoms, are crucial for nucleotide-binding. It is a glycine-rich loop preceded by a beta strand and followed by an alpha helix; these features are typically part of an α/β domain with four strands sandwiched between two helices on each side. The phosphate groups of the nucleotide are also coordinated to a divalent cation such as a magnesium, calcium, or manganese(II) ion.

Apart from the conserved lysine, a feature of the P-loop used in phosphate binding is a compound LRLR nest comprising the four residues xxGK, as above, whose main chain atoms form a phosphate-sized concavity with the NH groups pointing inwards. The synthetic hexapeptide SGAGKT has been shown to bind inorganic phosphate strongly; since such a short peptide does not form an alpha helix, this suggests that it is the nest, rather than being at the N-terminus of a helix, that is the main phosphate binding feature.

Upon nucleotide hydrolysis the loop does not significantly change the protein conformation, but stays bound to the remaining phosphate groups. Walker motif A-binding has been shown to cause structural changes in the bound nucleotide, along the line of the induced fit model of enzyme binding.

=== Similar folds ===
PTPs (protein tyrosine phosphatases) that catalyse the hydrolysis of an inorganic phosphate from a phosphotyrosine residue (the reverse of a tyrosine kinase reaction) contain a motif which folds into a P-loop-like structure with an arginine in the place of the conserved lysine. The conserved sequence of this motif is C-x(5)-R-[ST], where C and R denote cysteine and arginine residues respectively.

Pyridoxal phosphate (PLP) utilizing enzymes such as cysteine synthase have also been said to resemble a P-loop.

=== A-loop ===
The A-loop (aromatic residue interacting with the adenine ring of ATP) refers to conserved aromatic amino acids, essential for ATP-binding, found in about 25 amino acids upstream of the Walker A motif in a subset of P-loop proteins.

== Walker B motif ==
Walker B motif is a motif in most P-loop proteins situated well downstream of the A-motif. The consensus sequence of this motif was reported to be [RK]-x(3)-G-x(3)-LhhhD, where R, K, G, L and D denote arginine, lysine, glycine, leucine and aspartic acid residues respectively, x represents any of the 20 standard amino acids and h denotes a hydrophobic amino acid. This motif was changed to be hhhhDE, where E denotes a glutamate residue. The aspartate and glutamate also form a part of the DEAD/DEAH motifs found in helicases. The aspartate residue co-ordinates magnesium ions, and the glutamate is essential for ATP hydrolysis. There is considerable variability in the sequence of this motif, with the only invariant features being a negatively charged residue following a stretch of bulky, hydrophobic amino acids.

== Evolutionary connections ==
There is a hypothesis that the Walker A phosphate binding motif can be evolutionarily related to Rossman's fold phosphate binding motif because of the shared principles in the location of the binding loop between the first β-strand and α-helix in the αβα sandwich fold and positioning of the functionally important aspartate on the tip of the second β-strand.

== See also ==
- Activation loop
- Autophosphorylation
- Ca^{2+}/calmodulin-dependent protein kinase
- Cell signaling
- Cyclin-dependent kinase
- G protein-coupled receptor
- Nucleoside-diphosphate kinase
- Phosphatase
- Phosphatidylinositol phosphate kinases
- Phospholipid
- Phosphoprotein
- Phosphorylation
- Phosphotransferase
- Signal transduction
- Thymidine kinase
- Thymidine kinase in clinical chemistry
- Thymidylate kinase
- Wall-associated kinase
