= Chromosome 12 open reading frame 71 =

Protein encoded in humans by c12orf71 gene

C12orf71

Identifiers
- Aliases: C12orf71, chromosome 12 open reading frame 71
- External IDs: MGI: 1920594; HomoloGene: 53485; GeneCards: C12orf71; OMA:C12orf71 - orthologs

Gene location (Human)
Chr.	Chromosome 12 (human)
Band	12p11.23	Start	27,081,057 bp
Band	12p11.23	End	27,082,578 bp

Gene location (Mouse)
Chr.	Chromosome 6 (mouse)
Band	6|6 G3	Start	146,851,827 bp
Band	6|6 G3	End	146,855,920 bp
RNA expression pattern
Bgee	Human / Mouse (ortholog); Top expressed in: testicle; left testis; sural nerve; right testis; bone marrow; corpus callosum; granulocyte; cerebellar hemisphere; ectocervix; skin of abdomen / Top expressed in: interventricular septum; spermatid; seminiferous tubule; spermatocyte; tail of embryo; embryo; ascending aorta; aortic valve; genital tubercle; inferior colliculi; More reference expression data
BioGPS	n/a
Orthologs
Species	Human	Mouse
Entrez	728858	73344
Ensembl	ENSG00000214700	ENSMUSG00000040163
UniProt	A8MTZ7	Q80W69
RefSeq (mRNA)	NM_001080406; NM_001384983	NM_001164236; NM_028509
RefSeq (protein)	NP_001073875	NP_001157708; NP_082785
Location (UCSC)	Chr 12: 27.08 – 27.08 Mb	Chr 6: 146.85 – 146.86 Mb
PubMed search
- Wikidata
View/Edit Human	View/Edit Mouse

Chromosome 12 open reading frame 71 (c12orf71) is a protein which in humans is encoded by c12orf71 gene. The protein is also known by the alias LOC728858.

== Gene ==
The gene is located on the minus strand of chromosome 12 (12p11.23). The DNA sequence of the c12orf71 gene is 3071 base pairs long and 8 significant structural variations have been identified including deletions, duplications, gain- and loss-of-function mutations. c12orf71 gene was determined to be altered (gain of 21 Mb) in the chromosomal region 12p11.21-p13.3 of a male patient with chromosomal aberrations and in a duplication (gain of 411 kb) at chromosome 12p11.23 along with c12orf70, the coding regions of STK38L and ARNTL2 and a portion of PPFIBP1. Manual inspection of alignments, has determined that c12orf71 gene is mammalian specific. Furthermore, genome-wide screening has identified c12orf71 as one of 1000 disrupted genes that are positively selected by cisplatin, a chemotherapy drug.

== RNA ==
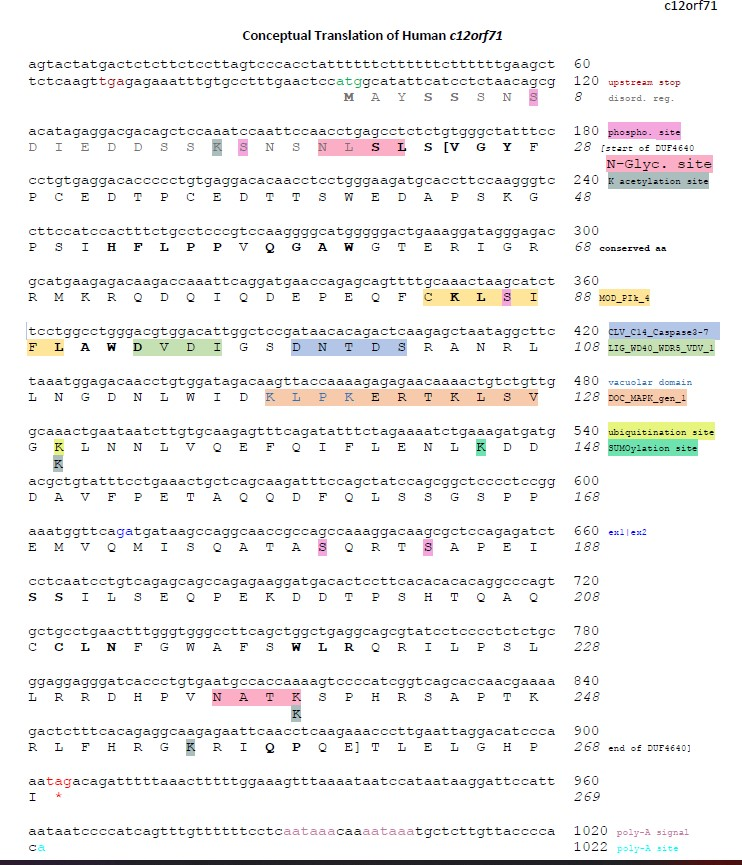
Figure 1. Conceptual translation of human c12orf71 with labeled domains, motifs, post-translational modifications and conserved amino acids.

c12orf71 transcript variant 1 mRNA is 1022 nucleotides long and consists of 2 exons. There is one more, slightly longer transcript variant of c12orf71, with a length of 1087 nucleotides. The mRNA sequence of c12orf71 transcript variant 1 consists of a coding sequence that spans over two exons and 2 poly-A signal sequences.

=== Expression ===
In humans c12orf71 has shown an intermediate expression level in testis and low expression in the bone marrow, skin, spleen, lymph node and liver. Human c12orf71 is expressed after the fetal-development stage. RNA-sequencing analysis has revealed that c12orf71 was expressed at a very low level or not expressed at all in osteoarthritis and non-osteoarthritis hip cartilage. A genome engineering study that studied mice knock-outs has found that c12orf71 has a decreased expression in humans compared to mouse testis, however the absence of the c12orf71 had no effect on mouse fertilization.

== Protein ==
c12orf71 protein is 269 amino acids long and the unmodified precursor protein has a predicted molecular weight of 30.4 kDa and a theoretical isoelectric point of 5.21. Additionally, the protein is rich in Serine and Aspartic Acid and has a relatively low amount of Valine and Tyrosine.

=== Cellular localization ===
Cellular localization analysis showed that human c12orf71 protein is found in the cytoplasm of the cell. All of the orthologs of the protein were also localized to the cytoplasm. Immunohistochemistry with polyclonal antibody for c12orf71 localized the protein in the cytosol of the cell.

=== Domains ===
The first 21 amino acids of the coding sequence are comprising a disordered region, followed by a domain of unknown function (DUF4640) which spans almost the whole coding sequence. Additionally, the human protein also contains a vacuolar domain, which is mammal specific and may be modulated by phosphorylation.

=== Post-translation modifications ===
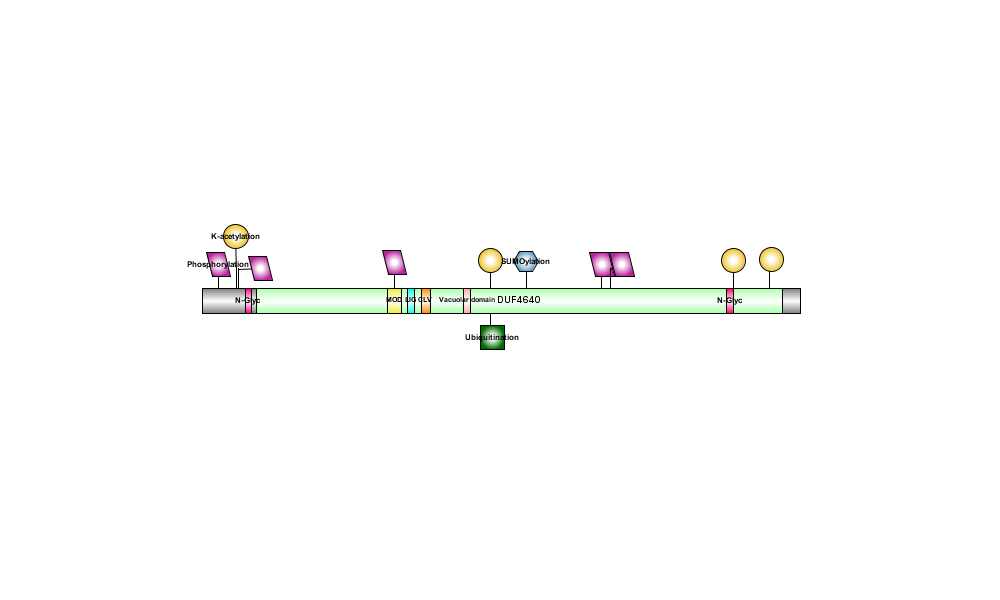
Figure 2. c12orf71 Protein diagram with labeled domains and post-translational modifications.

c12orf71 protein has multiple predicted phosphorylation sites, which can have an impact on the protein interactions and sub-cellular localization as well as affect the protein's stability and activity. The protein has one predicted SUMOylation and one ubiquitination predicted site, which can influence many biological functions of the protein, such as cellular response to stress and degradation, respectively. Five different Lysine acetylation sites were predicted, which can neutralize the positive charge on the Lysine, but at the same time the transfer of acetyl group can increase the expression of the protein. 2 N-glycosylation, multiple O-glycosylation and O-linked-N-acetylglucosaminylation sites were predicted, which could potentially affect the protein stability. There is a competition for Lysine-acetylation and ubiquitination at K130, suggesting that a deacetylase enzyme is acting at this site.

=== Interacting proteins ===
There is a direct interaction between c12orf71 and AP2B1, with a moderate confidence level. Adaptor related protein complex 2 subunit beta (AP2B1) helps establish a link between clathrin and receptors in coated vesicles. c12orf71 protein has been found to be present in a protein-protein interaction (PPI) network of the Carboxypeptidase M (CPM) gene, along with nine more genes.

Human c12orf71 interacting proteins
Protein	Function
YEATS4	YEATS domain-containing protein 4; Component of the NuA4 histone acetyltransferase (HAT) complex which is involved in transcriptional activation of select genes principally by acetylation of nucleosomal histones H4 and H2A.
CPM	Carboxypeptidase M; Specifically removes C-terminal basic residues (Arg or Lys) from peptides and proteins. It is believed to play important roles in the control of peptide hormone and growth factor activity at the cell surface, and in the membrane-localized degradation of extracellular proteins; Belongs to the peptidase M14 family
ZNF215	Zinc finger protein 215; May be involved in transcriptional regulation; SCAN domain containing
SPACA5B	Sperm acrosome associated 5B; Enable lysozyme activity
SPACA5	Sperm acrosome-associated protein 5; Belongs to the glycosyl hydrolase 22 family
LYZL4	Lysozyme-like protein 4; May be involved in fertilization (By similarity). Has no detectable bacteriolytic and lysozyme activities in vitro (By similarity); Belongs to the glycosyl hydrolase 22 family
LYZL6	Lysozyme-like protein 6; May be involved sperm-egg plasma membrane adhesion and fusion during fertilization. Exhibits bacteriolytic activity in vitro against Micrococcus luteus and Staphylococcus aureus. Shows weak bacteriolytic activity against Gram-positive bacteria at physiological pH. Bacteriolytic activity is pH- dependent, with a maximum at around pH 5.6; Lysozymes, c-type
NUP107	Nuclear pore complex protein Nup107; Plays a role in the nuclear pore complex (NPC) assembly and/or maintenance. Required for the assembly of peripheral proteins into the NPC. May anchor NUP62 to the NPC; Belongs to the nucleoporin Nup84/Nup107 family
SPRYD4	Spry domain-containing protein 4; SPRY domain containing 4
CPSF6	Cleavage and polyadenylation specificity factor subunit 6; Component of the cleavage factor Im complex (CFIm) that plays a key role in pre-mRNA 3'-processing. Involved in association with NUDT21/CPSF5 in pre-MRNA 3'-end poly(A) site cleavage and poly(A) addition. CPSF6 binds to cleavage and polyadenylation RNA substrates and promotes RNA looping; RNA binding motif containing

=== Structure ===
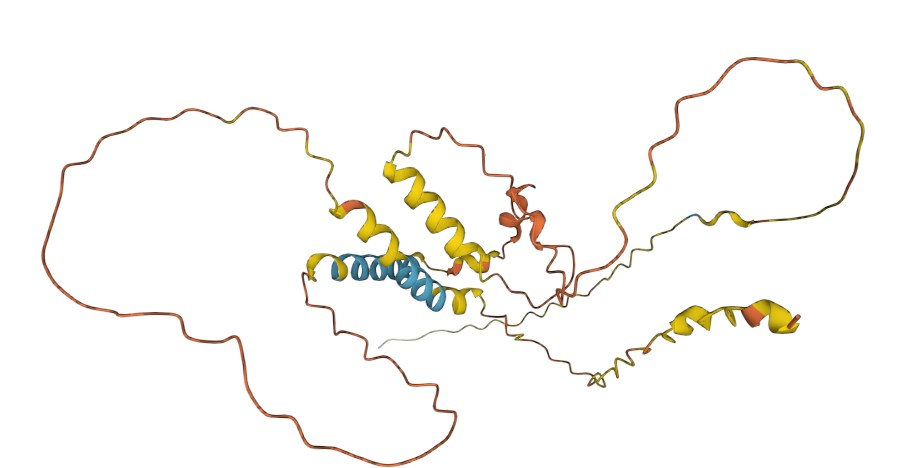
Figure 3. Predicted tertiary structure of human c12orf71 from AlphaFold

== Homology and evolution ==
Orthologs of the c12orf71 gene have been found only in mammals, in particular Theria (marsupials and placentals). No orthologs in monotremes, birds or reptiles, amphibians, fish, invertebrates, fungi, plants, bacteria, and viruses

Human c12orf71 gene orthologs
	Species	Common name	Order	Date of divergence (MYA)	Percent identity (%)	Percent similarity (%)	Length (amino acids)	Accession number
Primate mammals	Homo sapiens	Human	Primates	0	100.0	100.0	269	NP_001073875.1
Primate mammals	Pan paniscus	Pygmy chimpanzee	Primates	6.4	99.3	100.0	269	XP_003828900.1
Primate mammals	Gorilla gorilla gorilla	Gorilla	Primates	8.6	96.3	98.1	269	XP_004052946.1
Primate mammals	Pongo abelii	Sumatran orangutan	Primates	15.2	95.9	97.0	269	XP_002823096.1
Primate mammals	Nomascus leucogenys	Gibbon	Primates	19.6	93.7	95.5	269	XP_003265679.1
Placental mammals	Equus quagga	Zebra	Perissodactyla	87	59.9	72.0	279	XP_046519988.1
Placental mammals	Loxodonta africana	African savannah elephant	Proboscidea	87	61.3	73.5	279	XP_023410800.1
Placental mammals	Mus musculus	Mouse	Rhodentia	94	38.2	51.0	300	NP_001157708.1
Placental mammals	Bos taurus	Cattle	Artiodactyla	94	45.6	56.4	347	XP_010803693.1
Placental mammals	Panthera uncia	Snow leopard	Carnivora	94	49.7	62.9	325	XP_049483174.1
Placental mammals	Vulpes vulpes	Red fox	Carnivora	94	55.0	69.1	281	XP_025851313.1
Placental mammals	Leptonychotes weddellii	Weddell seal	Carnivora	94	55.0	70.9	281	XP_006740901.1
Placental mammals	Orycteropus afer afer	Aardvark	Tubulidentata	94	55.6	69.9	277	XP_007947992.1
Placental mammals	Pteropus alecto	Black flying fox	Chiroptera	94	55.9	72.2	278	XP_024903180.1
Placental mammals	Canis lupus familiaris	Dog	Carnivora	99	49.4	62.2	319	XP_005637089.1
Marsupials	Gracilinanus agilis	Agile gracile opossum	Didelphimorphia	160	26.4	43.0	341	XP_044534595.1
Marsupials	Trichosurus vulpecula	Common brushtail possum	Diprotodontia	160	30.1	44.2	320	XP_036616685.1
Marsupials	Sarcophilus harrisii	Tasmanian devil	Dasyuromorphia	160	30.2	45.9	318	XP_003772759.2
Marsupials	Vombatus ursinus	Common wombat	Diprotodontia	160	31.7	44.6	321	XP_027700114.1
Marsupials	Dromiciops gliroides	Colocolo opossum	Microbiotheria	160	32.3	45.9	317	XP_043823568.1

=== Evolutionary history ===
It has been estimated that c12orf71 gene first appeared in marsupials approximately 160 million years ago. Among the marsupial species, based on the sequence similarity, the gene has first appeared in species from the Microbotheria taxonomic group, represented by the Dromiciops Gliroides (Colocolo opossum) species. Only one isoform of the c12orf71 protein has been found in this species.

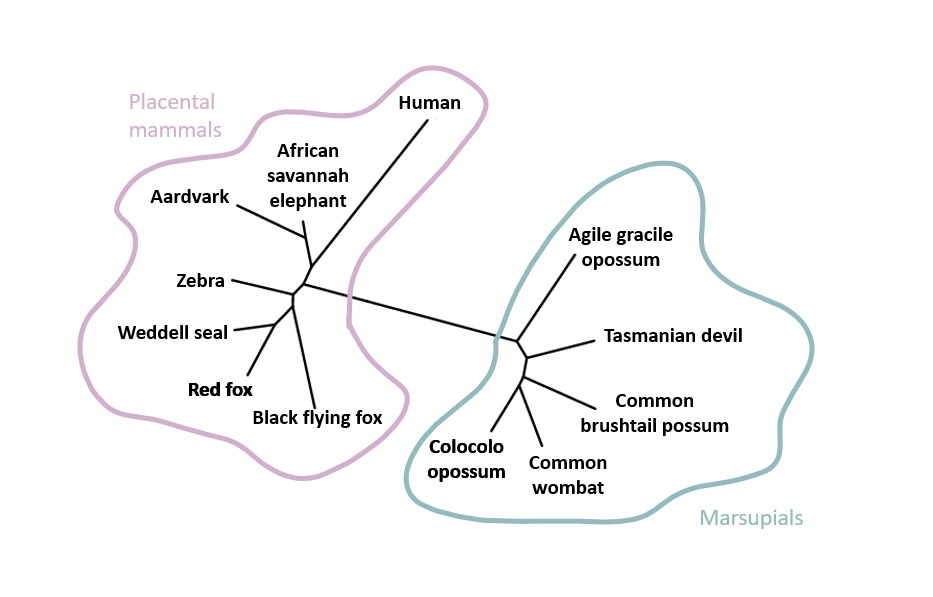
Figure 4. c12orf71 Time-calibrated Unrooted Phylogenetic Tree. The colored circles correspond to the species classification. Common names of the species were used. The phylogenetic tree was created using the One-Click Phylogeny Tool.

== Clinical association ==
There is only one disease associated with c12orf71 gene, common warts. A study of global gene methylation of common warts caused by HPV infection found that c12orf71 gene is differentially methylated in Arab male patients with common warts. In particular, c12orf71 is hypomethylated in skin infected with common warts compared to normal skin. 10 SNPs from the GWAS catalog associate c12orf71 gene with obsolete and androgenic alopecia, healing of bone mineral density and educational attainment.
