= NDR kinase =

NDR (nuclear dbf2-related) kinases, are an ancient and highly conserved subclass of AGC protein kinases that control diverse processes related to cell morphogenesis, proliferation, and mitotic events.

== Function and medical relevance ==
Like most AGC kinases, the NDR kinase subclass is activated by phosphorylation of a conserved serine or threonine in an activation region C-terminal to the kinase catalytic domain. The NDR kinases are distinguished by an apparently functionally essential binding of MOB co-activator proteins that are also widely present in eukaryotes. Most NDR kinase catalytic domains also contain an extended insert region that may function as an auto-inhibitory element. The NDR kinase family can be further divided into two subgroups, the Ndr family and the Wts/Lats family. Humans have four NDR kinases: Ndr1 (or STK38), Ndr2 (or STK38L), Lats1 (large tumor suppressor-1) and Lats2. In animals these kinases have reported roles in the regulation of diverse processes, including cell proliferation control, activity of proto-oncogenic proteins, apoptosis, centrosome duplication, and organization of neuronal dendrites.

In unicellular eukaryotes, Ndr kinases play important roles in the control of the cell cycle and morphogenesis. In the fission yeast Schizosaccharomyces pombe, an organism amenable for the study of cell morphogenesis, the Ndr kinase Orb6 has a role in cell polarity and morphogenesis control in part by the regulation of small Rho-type GTPase Cdc42. Specifically, Orb6 kinase spatially restricts Cdc42 activation to be at the polarized tips of a cell, causing the Cdc42-dependent formins, For3 (an F-actin cable polymerization factor), to also be activated at the cell tips, ensuring proper cell growth and polarization. Upon loss of Orb6 kinase function, cells fail to maintain a polarized cell shape and become round.
