= Kinase =

Enzyme catalyzing transfer of phosphate groups onto specific substrates

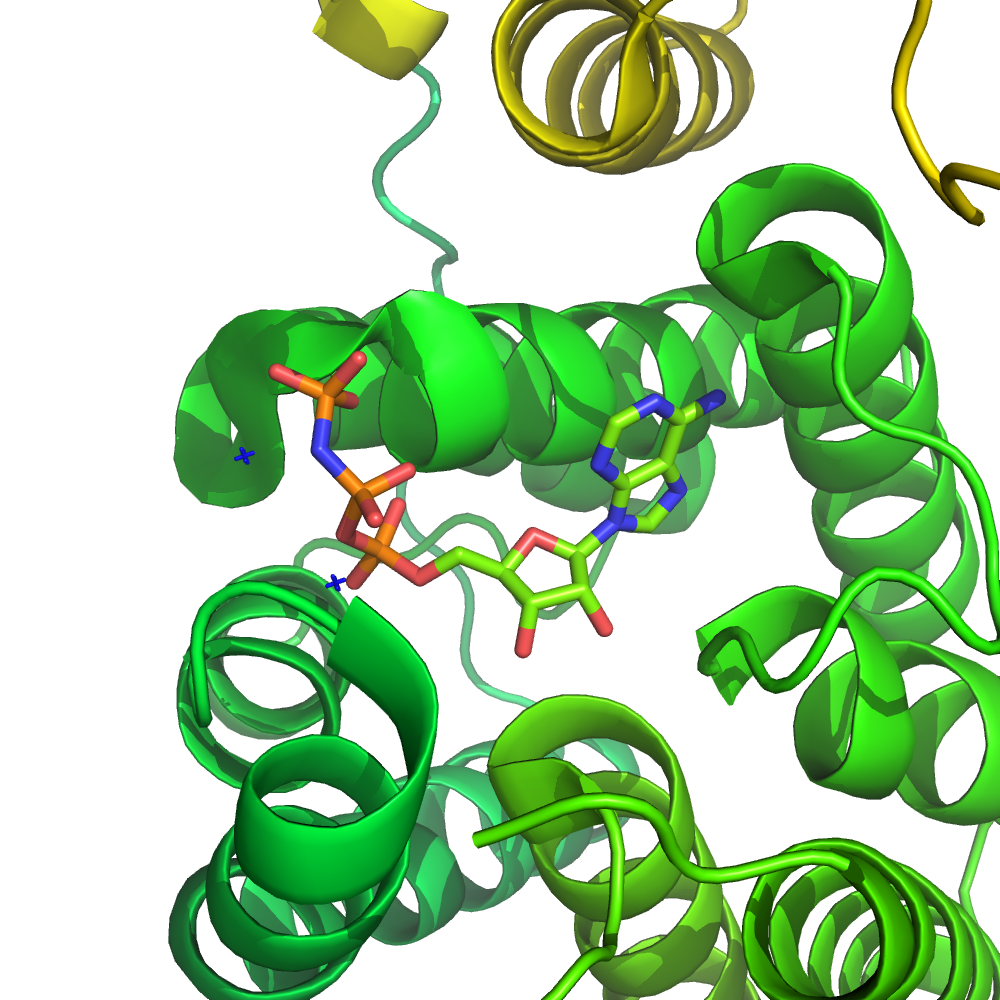
Dihydroxyacetone kinase in complex with a non-hydrolyzable ATP analog (AMP-PNP). Coordinates from PDB ID:1UN9.

In biochemistry, a kinase (/ˈkaɪneɪs, ˈkɪneɪs, -eɪz/, EC 2.7.-.-) is a protein enzyme that catalyzes the transfer of phosphate groups to substrates. This process is known as phosphorylation. Typically ATP is the phosphate donor. Kinases are pervasive, the human genome codes for about 500 of these enzymes.

Kinases are part of the larger family of phosphotransferases. Kinases should not be confused with phosphorylases, which catalyze the addition of inorganic phosphate groups to an acceptor, nor with phosphatases, which remove phosphate groups (dephosphorylation). The phosphorylation state of a molecule, whether it be a protein, lipid or carbohydrate, can affect its activity, reactivity and its ability to bind other molecules. Therefore, kinases are critical in metabolism, cell signalling, protein regulation, cellular transport, secretory processes and many other cellular pathways, which makes them very important to physiology.

== Biochemistry and functional relevance ==
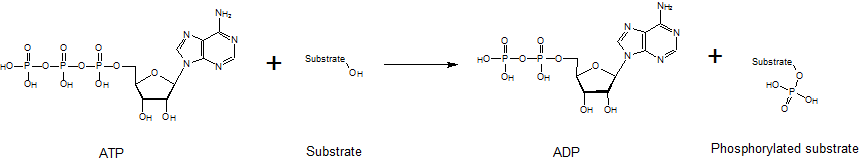
General reaction that is catalyzed by kinases

Kinases mediate the transfer of a phosphate moiety from a high energy molecule (such as ATP) to their substrate molecule, as seen in the figure below. Kinases are needed to stabilize this reaction because the phosphoanhydride bond contains a high level of energy. Kinases properly orient their substrate and the phosphoryl group within their active sites, which increases the rate of the reaction. Additionally, they commonly use positively charged amino acid residues, which electrostatically stabilize the transition state by interacting with the negatively charged phosphate groups. Alternatively, some kinases utilize bound metal cofactors in their active sites to coordinate the phosphate groups. Protein kinases can be classed as catalytically active (canonical) or as pseudokinases, reflecting the evolutionary loss of one or more of the catalytic amino acids that position or hydrolyse ATP. However, in terms of signalling outputs and disease relevance, both kinases and pseudokinases are important signalling modulators in human cells, making kinases important drug targets.

Kinases are used extensively to transmit signals and regulate complex processes in cells. Phosphorylation of molecules can enhance or inhibit their activity and modulate their ability to interact with other molecules. The addition and removal of phosphoryl groups provides the cell with a means of control because various kinases can respond to different conditions or signals. Mutations in kinases that lead to a loss-of-function or gain-of-function can cause cancer and disease in humans, including certain types of leukemia and neuroblastomas, glioblastoma, spinocerebellar ataxia (type 14), forms of agammaglobulinaemia, and many others.

== History and classification ==
The first protein to be recognized as catalyzing the phosphorylation of another protein using ATP was observed in 1954 by Eugene P. Kennedy at which time he described a liver enzyme that catalyzed the phosphorylation of casein. In 1956, Edmond H. Fischer and Edwin G. Krebs discovered that the interconversion between phosphorylase a and phosphorylase b was mediated by phosphorylation and dephosphorylation. The kinase that transferred a phosphoryl group to Phosphorylase b, converting it to Phosphorylase a, was named Phosphorylase Kinase. Years later, the first example of a kinase cascade was identified, whereby Protein Kinase A (PKA) phosphorylates Phosphorylase Kinase. At the same time, it was found that PKA inhibits glycogen synthase, which was the first example of a phosphorylation event that resulted in inhibition. In 1969, Lester Reed discovered that pyruvate dehydrogenase was inactivated by phosphorylation, and this discovery was the first clue that phosphorylation might serve as a means of regulation in other metabolic pathways besides glycogen metabolism. In the same year, Tom Langan discovered that PKA phosphorylates histone H1, which suggested phosphorylation might regulate nonenzymatic proteins. The 1970s included the discovery of calmodulin-dependent protein kinases and the finding that proteins can be phosphorylated on more than one amino acid residue. The 1990s may be described as the "decade of protein kinase cascades". During this time, the MAPK/ERK pathway, the JAK kinases (a family of protein tyrosine kinases), and the PIP3-dependent kinase cascade were discovered.

Kinases are classified into broad groups by the substrate they act upon: protein kinases, lipid kinases, carbohydrate kinases. Kinases can be found in a variety of species, from bacteria to mold to worms to mammals. More than five hundred different protein kinases have been identified in humans. Their diversity and their role in signaling makes them an interesting object of study. Various other kinases act on small molecules such as lipids, carbohydrates, amino acids, and nucleotides, either for signaling or to prime them for metabolic pathways. Specific kinases are often named after their substrates. Protein kinases often have multiple substrates, and proteins can serve as substrates for more than one specific kinase. For this reason protein kinases are named based on what regulates their activity (i.e. Calmodulin-dependent protein kinases). Sometimes they are further subdivided into categories because there are several isoenzymatic forms. For example, type I and type II cyclic-AMP dependent protein kinases have identical catalytic subunits but different regulatory subunits that bind cyclic AMP.

== Protein kinases ==
Overview of signal transduction pathways. Many of the proteins involved are kinases, including protein kinases (such as MAPK and JAK) and lipid kinases (such as PI3K).

Protein kinases act on proteins, by phosphorylating them on their serine, threonine, tyrosine, or histidine residues. Phosphorylation can modify the function of a protein in many ways. It can increase or decrease a protein's activity, stabilize it or mark it for destruction, localize it within a specific cellular compartment, and it can initiate or disrupt its interaction with other proteins. The protein kinases make up the majority of all kinases and are widely studied. These kinases, in conjunction with phosphatases, play a major role in protein and enzyme regulation as well as signalling in the cell.

A common point of confusion arises when thinking about the different ways a cell achieves biological regulation. There are countless examples of covalent modifications that cellular proteins can undergo; however, phosphorylation is one of the few reversible covalent modifications. This provided the rationale that phosphorylation of proteins is regulatory. The potential to regulate protein function is enormous given that there are many ways to covalently modify a protein in addition to regulation provided by allosteric control. In his Hopkins Memorial Lecture, Edwin Krebs asserted that allosteric control evolved to respond to signals arising from inside the cell, whereas phosphorylation evolved to respond to signals outside of the cell. This idea is consistent with the fact that phosphorylation of proteins occurs much more frequently in eukaryotic cells in comparison to prokaryotic cells because the more complex cell type evolved to respond to a wider array of signals.

=== Cyclin dependent kinases ===
Cyclin dependent kinases (CDKs) are a group of several different kinases involved in regulation of the cell cycle. They phosphorylate other proteins on their serine or threonine residues, but CDKs must first bind to a cyclin protein in order to be active. Different combinations of specific CDKs and cyclins mark different parts of the cell cycle. Additionally, the phosphorylation state of CDKs is also critical to their activity, as they are subject to regulation by other kinases (such as CDK-activating kinase) and phosphatases (such as Cdc25). Once the CDKs are active, they phosphorylate other proteins to change their activity, which leads to events necessary for the next stage of the cell cycle. While they are most known for their function in cell cycle control, CDKs also have roles in transcription, metabolism, and other cellular events.

Because of their key role in the controlling cell division, mutations in CDKs are often found in cancerous cells. These mutations lead to uncontrolled growth of the cells, where they are rapidly going through the whole cell cycle repeatedly. CDK mutations can be found in lymphomas, breast cancer, pancreatic tumors, and lung cancer. Therefore, inhibitors of CDK have been developed as treatments for some types of cancer.

=== Mitogen-activated protein kinases ===
MAP kinases (MAPKs) are a family of serine/threonine kinases that respond to a variety of extracellular growth signals. For example, growth hormone, epidermal growth factor, platelet-derived growth factor, and insulin are all considered mitogenic stimuli that can engage the MAPK pathway. Activation of this pathway at the level of the receptor initiates a signaling cascade whereby the Ras GTPase exchanges GDP for GTP. Next, Ras activates Raf kinase (also known as MAPKKK), which activates MEK (MAPKK). MEK activates MAPK (also known as ERK), which can go on to regulate transcription and translation. Whereas RAF and MAPK are both serine/threonine kinases, MAPKK is a tyrosine/threonine kinase.

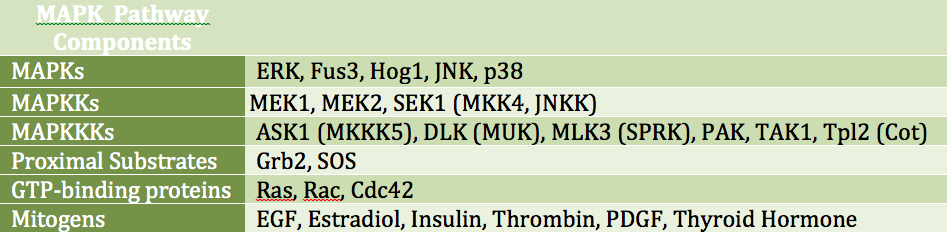
A variety of mitogenic signals engage the MAPK pathway and promote cell growth and differentiation through a kinase cascade.

MAPK can regulate transcription factors directly or indirectly. Its major transcriptional targets include ATF-2, Chop, c-Jun, c-Myc, DPC4, Elk-1, Ets1, Max, MEF2C, NFAT4, Sap1a, STATs, Tal, p53, CREB, and Myc. MAPK can also regulate translation by phosphorylating the S6 kinase in the large ribosomal subunit. It can also phosphorylate components in the upstream portion of the MAPK signalling cascade including Ras, Sos, and the EGF receptor itself.

The carcinogenic potential of the MAPK pathway makes it clinically significant. It is implicated in cell processes that can lead to uncontrolled growth and subsequent tumor formation. Mutations within this pathway alter its regulatory effects on cell differentiation, proliferation, survival, and apoptosis, all of which are implicated in various forms of cancer.

== Lipid kinases ==
Lipid kinases phosphorylate lipids in the cell, both on the plasma membrane as well as on the membranes of the organelles. The addition of phosphate groups can change the reactivity and localization of the lipid and can be used in signal transmission.

=== Phosphatidylinositol kinases ===
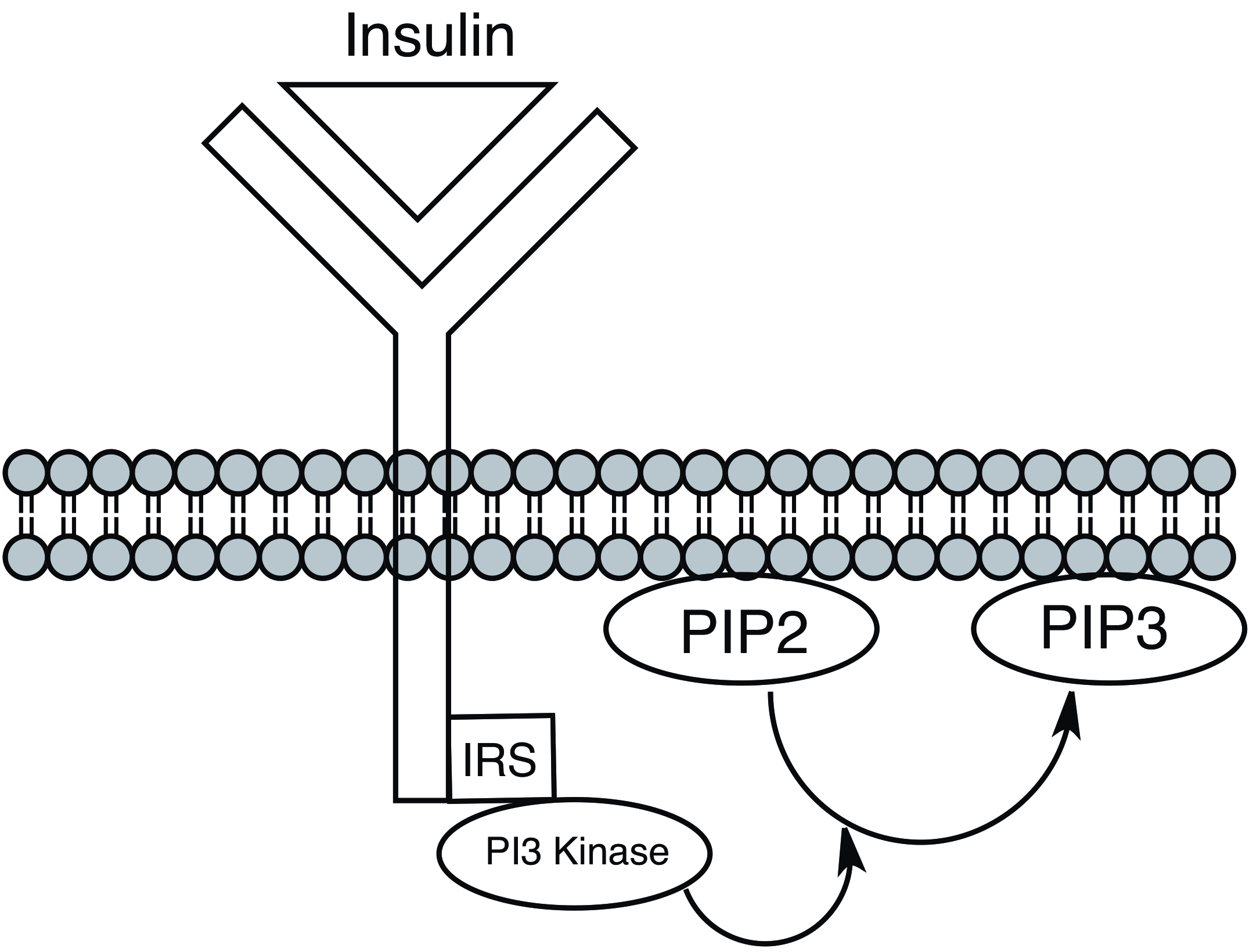
Insulin binding to its receptor leads allows PI3 kinase to dock at the membrane where it can phosphorylate PI lipids

Phosphatidylinositol kinases phosphorylate phosphatidylinositol species, to create species such as phosphatidylinositol 3,4-bisphosphate (PI(3,4)P_{2}), phosphatidylinositol 3,4,5-trisphosphate (PIP_{3}), and phosphatidylinositol 3-phosphate (PI3P). The kinases include phosphoinositide 3-kinase (PI3K), phosphatidylinositol-4-phosphate 3-kinase, and phosphatidylinositol-4,5-bisphosphate 3-kinase. The phosphorylation state of phosphatidylinositol plays a major role in cellular signalling, such as in the insulin signalling pathway, and also has roles in endocytosis, exocytosis and other trafficking events. Mutations in these kinases, such as PI3K, can lead to cancer or insulin resistance.

The kinase enzymes increase the rate of the reactions by making the inositol hydroxyl group more nucleophilic, often using the side chain of an amino acid residue to act as a general base and deprotonate the hydroxyl, as seen in the mechanism below. Here, a reaction between adenosine triphosphate (ATP) and phosphatidylinositol is coordinated. The end result is a phosphatidylinositol-3-phosphate as well as adenosine diphosphate (ADP). The enzymes can also help to properly orient the ATP molecule, as well as the inositol group, to make the reaction proceed faster. Metal ions are often coordinated for this purpose.

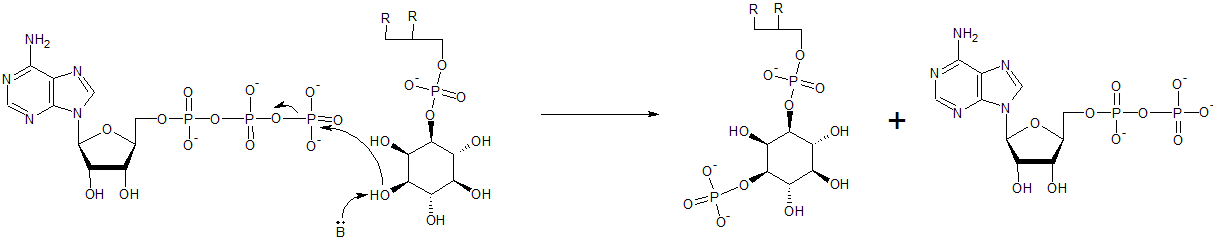
Mechanism of phosphatidylinositol-3 kinase. ATP and phosphatidylinositol react to form phosphatidylinositol-3-phosphate and ADP, with the help of general base B.

=== Sphingosine kinases ===
Sphingosine kinase (SK) is a lipid kinase that catalyzes the conversion of sphingosine to sphingosine-1-phosphate (S1P). Sphingolipids are ubiquitous membrane lipids. Upon activation, sphingosine kinase migrates from the cytosol to the plasma membrane where it transfers a γ phosphate (which is the last or terminal phosphate) from ATP or GTP to sphingosine. The S1P receptor is a GPCR receptor, so S1P has the ability to regulate G protein signaling. The resulting signal can activate intracellular effectors like ERKs, Rho GTPase, Rac GTPase, PLC, and AKT/PI3K. It can also exert its effect on target molecules inside the cell. S1P has been shown to directly inhibit the histone deacetylase activity of HDACs. In contrast, the dephosphorylated sphingosine promotes cell apoptosis, and it is therefore critical to understand the regulation of SKs because of its role in determining cell fate. Past research shows that SKs may sustain cancer cell growth because they promote cellular-proliferation, and SK1 (a specific type of SK) is present at higher concentrations in certain types of cancers.

There are two kinases present in mammalian cells, SK1 and SK2. SK1 is more specific compared to SK2, and their expression patterns differ as well. SK1 is expressed in lung, spleen, and leukocyte cells, whereas SK2 is expressed in kidney and liver cells. The involvement of these two kinases in cell survival, proliferation, differentiation, and inflammation makes them viable candidates for chemotherapeutic therapies.

== Carbohydrate kinases ==
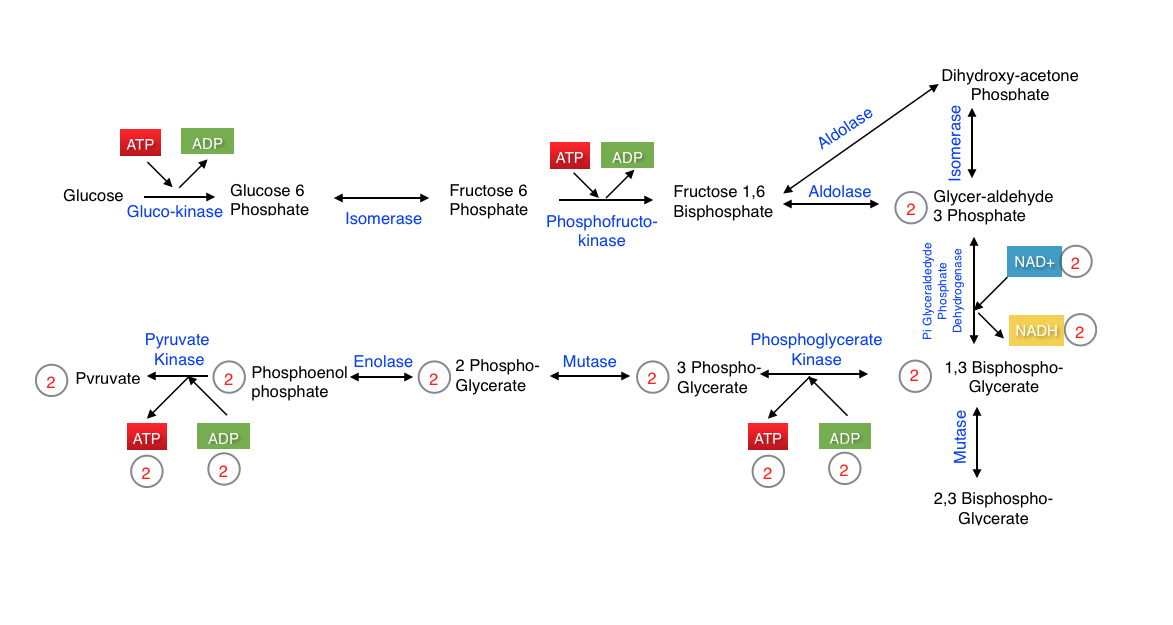

For many mammals, carbohydrates provide a large portion of the daily caloric requirement. To harvest energy from oligosaccharides, they must first be broken down into monosaccharides so they can enter metabolism. Kinases play an important role in almost all metabolic pathways. The figure on the left shows the second phase of glycolysis, which contains two important reactions catalyzed by kinases. The anhydride linkage in 1,3 bisphosphoglycerate is unstable and has a high energy. 1,3-bisphosphogylcerate kinase requires ADP to carry out its reaction yielding 3-phosphoglycerate and ATP. In the final step of glycolysis, pyruvate kinase transfers a phosphoryl group from phosphoenolpyruvate to ADP, generating ATP and pyruvate.

Hexokinase is the most common enzyme that makes use of glucose when it first enters the cell. It converts D-glucose to glucose-6-phosphate by transferring the gamma phosphate of an ATP to the C6 position. This is an important step in glycolysis because it traps glucose inside the cell due to the negative charge. In its dephosphorylated form, glucose can move back and forth across the membrane very easily. Mutations in the hexokinase gene can lead to a hexokinase deficiency which can cause nonspherocytic hemolytic anemia.

Phosphofructokinase, or PFK, catalyzes the conversion of fructose-6-phosphate to fructose-1,6-bisphosphate and is an important point in the regulation of glycolysis. High levels of ATP, H^{+}, and citrate inhibit PFK. If citrate levels are high, it means that glycolysis is functioning at an optimal rate. High levels of AMP stimulate PFK. Tarui's disease, a glycogen storage disease that leads to exercise intolerance, is due to a mutation in the PFK gene that reduces its activity.

== Other kinases ==
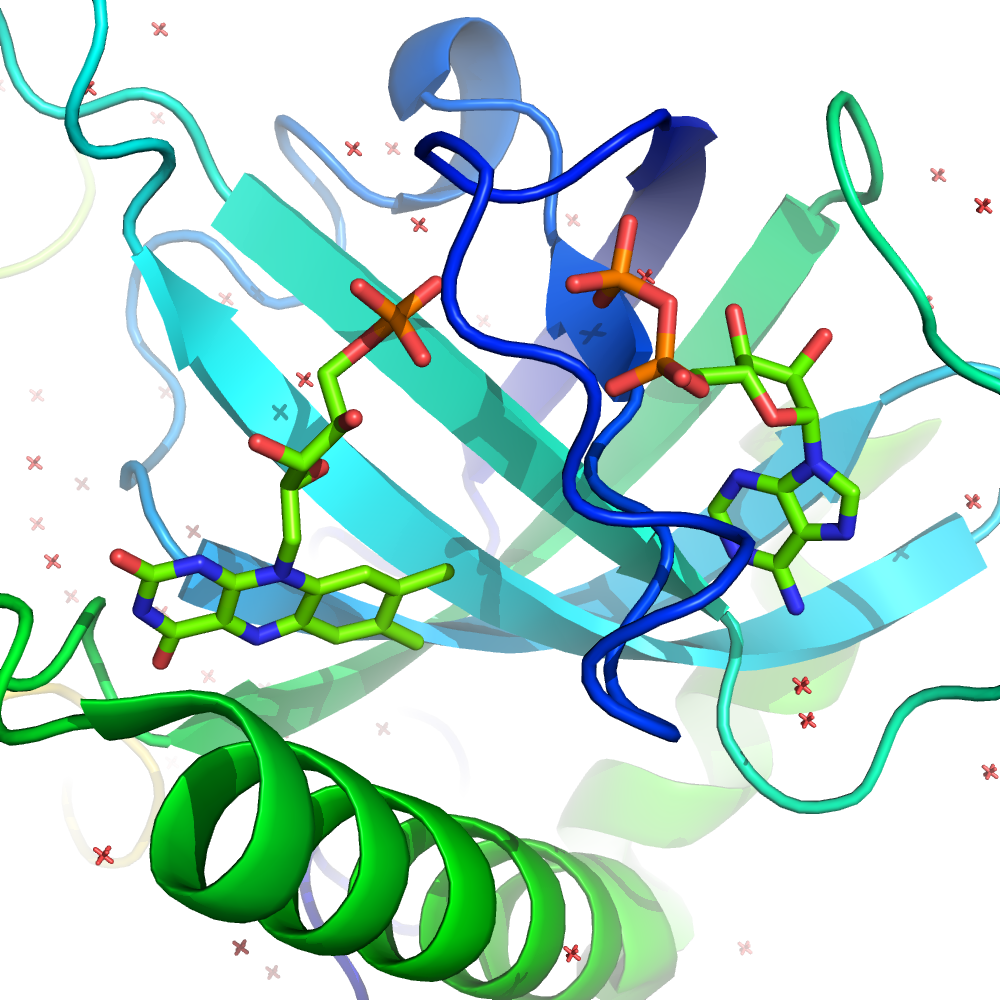
The active site of riboflavin kinase bound to its products--FMN (on left) and ADP (on right). Coordinates from PDB ID: 1N07.

Kinases act upon many other molecules besides proteins, lipids, and carbohydrates. There are many that act on nucleotides (DNA and RNA) including those involved in nucleotide interconverstion, such as nucleoside-phosphate kinases and nucleoside-diphosphate kinases. Other small molecules that are substrates of kinases include creatine, phosphoglycerate, riboflavin, dihydroxyacetone, shikimate, and many others.

=== Riboflavin kinase ===
Riboflavin kinase catalyzes the phosphorylation of riboflavin to create flavin mononucleotide(FMN). It has an ordered binding mechanism where riboflavin must bind to the kinase before it binds to the ATP molecule. Divalent cations help coordinate the nucleotide. The general mechanism is shown in the figure below.

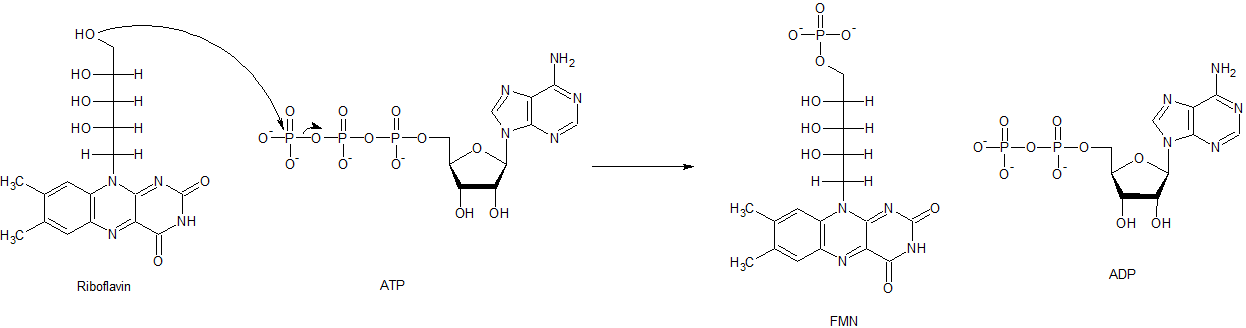
Mechanism of riboflavin kinase.

Riboflavin kinase plays an important role in cells, as FMN is an important cofactor. FMN also is a precursor to flavin adenine dinucleotide(FAD), a redox cofactor used by many enzymes, including many in metabolism. In fact, there are some enzymes that are capable of carrying out both the phosphorylation of riboflavin to FMN, as well as the FMN to FAD reaction. Riboflavin kinase may help prevent stroke, and could possibly be used as a treatment in the future. It is also implicated in infection, when studied in mice.

=== Thymidine kinase ===
Thymidine kinase is one of the many nucleoside kinases that are responsible for nucleoside phosphorylation. It phosphorylates thymidine to create thymidine monophosphate (dTMP). This kinase uses an ATP molecule to supply the phosphate to thymidine, as shown below. This transfer of a phosphate from one nucleotide to another by thymidine kinase, as well as other nucleoside and nucleotide kinases, functions to help control the level of each of the different nucleotides.

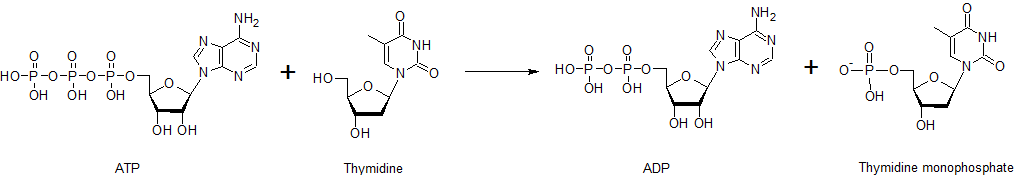
Overall reaction catalysed by thymidine kinase.

After creation of the dTMP molecule, another kinase, thymidylate kinase, can act upon dTMP to create the diphosphate form, dTDP. Nucleoside diphosphate kinase catalyzes production of thymidine triphosphate, dTTP, which is used in DNA synthesis. Because of this, thymidine kinase activity is closely correlated with the cell cycle and used as a tumor marker in clinical chemistry. Therefore, it can sometime be used to predict patient prognosis. Patients with mutations in the thymidine kinase gene may have a certain type of mitochondrial DNA depletion syndrome, a disease that leads to death in early childhood.

== Kinases and health ==
Given the pervasiveness of kinases, it is unsurprising that mutations in genes coding for them cause many diseases. Myotonic muscular dystrophy, Hirschsprung's disease, craniosynostosis, and chronic myelomonocytic leukaemia are some of these diseases.

== See also ==
- Activation loop
- Autophosphorylation
- Ca^{2+}/calmodulin-dependent protein kinase
- Cell signaling
- Cyclin-dependent kinase
- G protein-coupled receptor
- NDR kinase
- Nucleoside-diphosphate kinase
- Phosphatase
- Phosphatidylinositol phosphate kinases
- Phospholipid
- Phosphoprotein
- Phosphorylation
- Phosphotransferase
- Signal transduction
- Thymidine kinase
- Thymidine kinase in clinical chemistry
- Thymidylate kinase
- Wall-associated kinase
