= Phosphatidylinositol phosphate kinases =

Phosphatidylinositol phosphate kinases (PIPK) are kinases that phosphorylate the phosphoinositides PtdInsP and PtdInsP_{2} that are derivatives of phosphatidylinositol (PtdIns). It has been found that PtdIns is only phosphorylated on three (3,4,5) of its five hydroxyl groups, possibly because D-2 and D-6 hydroxyl groups cannot be phosphorylated because of steric hindrance. All 7 combinations of phosphorylated PtdIns have been found in animals, all except PtdIns(3,4,5)P_{3} have been found in plants.

PIPKs are today divided into three groups, type I, II and III that share significant sequence homology but differ in the substrate specificities, subcellular localisations and functions. Type 1 are PIPKs that phosphorylate PtdIns4P to PtdIns(4,5)P_{2} and are called PtdIns4P 5-kinases because they phosphorylate on the D-5 hydroxyl group. Type II PIPKs phosphorylate PtdIns5P at the D-4 site and are called PtdIns5P 4-kinases. And finally PIPKs of type III are PtdIns3P 5-kinases that phosphorylate PtdIns to PtdIns(3,5)P_{2}, which prototype is Fab1 in yeast (see for descriptive picture). The substrate specificity of type I and II depends on the so-called activation loop. The activation loop is a segment of 22 to 27 amino acid residues, located close to the C-terminal end of the catalytic domain in all PIPKs. When the activation loops of a type I and a type II PIPK were swapped, the chimera with type I backbone showed specificity for type II substrate, and vice versa for the other chimera.

== List of PIPKs ==
- Phosphatidylinositol-4-phosphate 3-kinase
- Phosphatidylinositol-4,5-bisphosphate 3-kinase
- Phosphatidylinositol-4-phosphate 5-kinase
