= Wall-associated kinase =

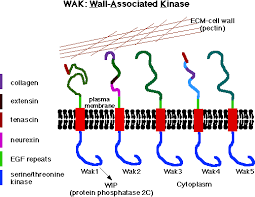
- WAKs and Pectin Within The Cell Wall

Identifiers
- Symbol: WAK
- Pfam: PF08488
- InterPro: IPR013695
- Membranome: 725
Available protein structures:
- Pfam: structures / ECOD
- PDB: RCSB PDB; PDBe; PDBj
- PDBsum: structure summary

Wall-associated kinases (WAKs) are one of many classes of plant proteins known to serve as a medium between the extracellular matrix (ECM) and cytoplasm of cell walls. They are serine-threonine kinases that contain epidermal growth factor (EGF) repeats, a cytoplasmic kinase and are located in the cell walls. They provide a linkage between the inner and outer surroundings of cell walls. WAKs are under a group of receptor-like kinases (RLK) that are actively involved in sensory and signal transduction pathways especially in response to foreign attacks by pathogens and in cell development. On the other hand, pectins are an abundant group of complex carbohydrates present in the primary cell wall that play roles in cell growth and development, protection, plant structure and water holding capacity.

Cell wall associated kinases are receptor-like protein kinases, found in plant cell walls, that have the capability to transmit signals directly by their cytoplasmic kinase domains. They usually link the plasma membrane to the protein and carbohydrate that composed the cell wall. The receptor-like proteins contain a cytoplasmic serine threonine kinase and a less conserved region; bound to the cell wall and contains a series of epidermal growth factor repeats. WAKs are found in various plants and crops like rice, and maize. In plants genome like Arabidopsis, WAKs, are encoded by five highly similar genes clustered in a 30-kb locus, among them WAK1 & WAK2 are highly distributed. They are primarily involved in regulating plant cell wall functions including cell expansion, bind as well as response to pectins, pathogen response and also protects plants from detrimental effects.

Pectins are rich in galacturonic acids (OGs) and present in the middle lamellae in plant tissues where they provide strength, flexibility and adhesion between plant cells. Commercially and within the food industry, they are used as gels and stabilizers for desserts and juices. The role of WAKs in cell walls as pectin receptors is vital to a variety of functions involved with cell differentiation, form and host-pathogen relations.

== History ==
The association of WAKs with The Plant Cell wall was first compromised by immunolocalization technique using antiserum where epitome of WAK are found to be tightly bound with cell wall fragments so that they can not be separated using detergent, however, WAKs could be released by boiling the walls with SDS, dithiothreitol (a strong thiol reductant), protoplasting enzymes or pectinase.

== Gene ==
WAKs protein composed of five types of highly similar genes located tightly in a 30 kb clusters of Arabidopsis genome. Most of the WAKs are expressed throughout the plant whether WAK1, 2, 3 and 5 are expressed in green organs, WAK1 and 2 weakly expressed in flowers and siliques and WAK2 is also expressed in roots, however, WAK4 is only expressed in siliques. There are also 21 WAK like gene in Arabitopsis genome known as WAKLs which have a little sequence similarity with WAKs.

The Ara WAK and WAKL genes are distributed among all five chromosomes of Arabidopsis

| Chromosome number | Genes localized |
|---|---|
| I | WAKL1-13, WAKL22, WAK1-5 |
| II | WAKL14 |
| III | WAKL14 |
| III | WAKL15, WAKL16 |
| IV | WAKL17, WAKL18, WAKL19 |
| V | WAKL20, WAKL21 |

WAK/WAKL gene family members in Arabidopsis were divided into four groups based on the pair-wise comparisons of their predicted protein sequences. WAK1 to WAK5 containing EGF-Ca^{2+} domain with an overlapping Asp/Asn hydroxylation site and an EGF-2 domain were placed in Group I. Both the EGF domains were predicted to be completely encoded by the second exon. Seven WAKL members that include WAKL1 to WAKL6 and WAKL22 were placed in Group II. In all these group II genes, the EGF-Ca^{2+} and EGF-2 domains are separated by a short gap of 15-18 aa and were reversed in order relative to group I. The EGF-Ca^{2+} domain is encoded by first exon and EGF-Ca^{2+} domain is encoded by second exon. No Asn/asp hydroxylation site was predicted.

Group III contains six members: WAKL9, WAKL10, WAKL11, WAKL13, WAKL17, and WAKL18. Their corresponding proteins all contain EGF-Ca^{2+} and EGF2 domains, and they are structurally similar to the Group II WAKLs. In WAKL13, the EGF-Ca^{2+} domain is degenerate. With the exception of WAKL17, all have degenerate EGF2 domains.

Group IV contains four members: WAKL14, WAKL15, WAKL20, and WAKL21. Each has an EGF2 domain encoded by the first exon. This domain is degenerate in both WAKL20 and WAKL21. All four members lack the EGF-Ca^{2+} domain. In addition, each has a cytoplasmic protein kinase ATP-binding domain (PS00107). The remaining sequences (WAKL7, WAKL8, WAKL12, WAKL16, and WAKL19) are predicted to encode abbreviated WAKL proteins. WAKL7, WAKL8 and WAKL19 are similar to various other WAKLs in their extracellular regions, and lack a transmembrane domain. WAKL8 and WAKL9 both contain an EGF-Ca^{2+} domain and WAKL19 contains a degenerate EGF2 domain. Neither of these domains is present in WAKL7. WAKL12 also contains an EGF-Ca^{2+} domain, but unlike WAKL8, it contains a trans-membrane domain. WAKL16 contains a transmembrane domain, an STK domain that is most similar to WAK3, and a short extracellular domain of eight amino acids that lacks both of the EGF-like domains.

== Families ==
Wall-Associated Kinases (WAKs) are a subfamily of receptor-like kinases (RLKs) associated with the cell wall. They were described in Arabidopsis thaliana as a cluster of five (WAK1-5), and 22 (WAKL1-WAKL22) genes.

WAK/WAKL (OsWAK) gene Family in Rice

- OsWAK-RLKs (Receptor-like kinases)- contain both extracellular EGF-like domains and an intracellular kinase domain
- OsWAK-RLCKs (Receptor-like cytoplasmic kinases)- contain only the kinase domain
- OsWAK-RLPs (receptor-like proteins)- Contain only the extracellular EGF-like domains
- OsWAK short genes- lacking both the domains but has > 40% identity at the aminoacid level with other OsWAK members
- pseudogenes (with either stop codons or frame shifts in coding region)

== Structure ==
All the five WAK proteins have highly conserved serine/threonine protein kinase domain (86% similarity) on the cytoplasmic side and an extracellular domain (only 40% to 64% similarity in amino acid sequences). Moreover, All of the isomers of WAK proteins have epidermal growth factor (EGF) like repeats located at the amino-terminal side. Six cysteins (located in the EGF repeats) positions are well-kept in all the five WAKs, however, protein-protein interactions of WAks are still unknown.

All WAKs (WAKs 1-5) have Asp/Asn hydroxylation site (Cx[DN]x(4)[FY]xCxC; Prosite PS00010) overlapping with calcium binding EGF domains where both hydroxylated and nonhydroxylated forms of coagulation proteases have equal affinities for calcium at physiological concentrations. Hydroxyl group may be involved in hydrogen bonding in protein-protein interactions mediated by the EGF-like domain.

WAKs' association with cell wall is very strong (having covalent link to pectin), such that its release from the cell wall requires enzymatic digestion. Under conditions that collapse the turgor of a plant cell so as to separate the membrane from the wall (plasmolysis), the WAKs-wall association is so strong that they remain in the cell wall. There are five WAK's isoform in Arabidopsis with variable extracellular domain within these isoform, all of which contain at least two epidermal growth factor (EGF). Of all these isoforms, WAK1 and WAK2 are most ubiquitous and their messenger RNA (mRNAs) and proteins are present in vegetative meristem and areas of cell expansion.

== Interaction ==
WAK1 is crosslinked in endomembranes, and its transport to the cell surface requires correct cell-wall synthesis. The interaction between WAK1 and pectins (Pectins are complex oligopolysaccharides formed a hydrophilic gel-like matrix between the cellulose microfibrils, and can be concentrated in different regions of the cell wall) was confirmed by using anti-WAK1 and anti-pectin JIM5 and JIM7 antibodies recognized the same 68 kDa protein band in western blots of the cell wall proteins extracted from pectinase-treated cell walls. This pectin-kinase hybrid located for reporting to the cytoplasm on the cell wall where WAK1 is bound in a calcium-induced conformation to polygalacturonic acid, oligogalacturonides and pectins and this interaction was prevented by methyl esterification, calcium chelators and pectin depolymerization. The interaction of pectin polyanion with the cell wall or plasmalemma could induce conformational changes in the pectin polymers that affect their gelling and swelling behavior in the presence of the calcium and the binding of pectins to WAK1 in the presence of calcium could result in muro disturbances of the pectin network that could generate signals within the cell wall.

== Function ==
Wall associated Kinases (WAKs) contribute several functions (cell division or growth) as other plant receptors like cell wall sensors, however, the unique characteristics is to bind directly to pectin that postulates a WAK-dependent signaling pathway regulating cell expansion. They are also contributed to the pathogen and stress responses, heavy metal tolerance, and plant development.

WAKs may contribute to cell elongation since they have an active cytoplasmic protein kinase domain that span the plasma membrane, and contain an N terminus which binds the cell wall whether WAK2 can regulate invertase at the transcriptional level. WAKs can also regulate cell expansion through a control of sugar concentration and thus turgor control where wak2-1 phenotype could be rescued by the expression of sucrose phosphate synthase that alters sugar sinks. However, Antisense WAK RNA can be induced using the Dex system which contributes to a 50% reduction in WAK protein levels as well as a smaller cell size, rather than fewer cells. A wak2-1 (WAK2 null allele) causes a loss of cell expansion in roots, but only under limiting sugar and salt conditions, however, Individual loss of function alleles in any of the four other WAKs do not result in an obvious phenotype. Kohorn et al.(2006a) suggested that WAKs can be cross-linked to cell wall material, however, the assembly and crosslinking of WAKs begin at an early stage within a cytoplasmic compartment rather than in the cell wall itself and also coordinated with the synthesis of surface cellulose. WAKs are released from pectinase of the cell wall material where they are bound to pectins. Therefore, WAK1 or 2 binds to pectin have a higher affinity for de-esterified pectin than to esterified molecules. Moreover, short pectin fragments of a degree of polymerization (dp) 9–15 effectively competed with longer pectins for WAK binding. Both WAK1 and WAK 2 bind to a variety of pectins including polymers of homogalacturonan (HA), OGs, and to rhamnogalacturonans (RG) I and II. The binding requirements are not to a simple polymer of HA, but perhaps the presence of galacturonic acid. The biological activity of pectin fragments, or OGs, contributes to defense and stress responses, and in developmental processes where WAKs function as the receptor.

Wall-associated kinases are involved in pathogen and stress responses.

=== Signal transduction pathway ===
Kohorn (2016) suggested that "pectin polymers can be cross-linked in the cell wall with Ca^{+}, and WAKs bind these pectins and signal via the activation of vacuolar invertase and numerous other induced proteins to aid in cell expansion. The methyl esterification state of the pectin is modulated by pectin methylesterases (PMEs) and WAKs bind de-methylated pectin with higher affinity. Pectin is fragmented by biotic and abiotic events and the oligo-galacturonides (OGs), have a higher affinity for the WAKs and induce a stress response".

=== WAKs bind pectin ===
Galacturonic acid: Major component of pectin

Wall-associated kinases are receptors with a calcium mediated cross-link to the cell wall of plants. The presence of a galacturonic acid backbone in the various types of pectin is predicted to be a vital feature for binding to WAKs as WAK1 and WAK2 bind to different pectins including polymers of homogalacturonan (HA) the most abundant pectin in cell walls; Oligogalacturonic acids (OG), and to rhamnogalacturonans (RG) I and II. In-vitro binding between WAKs and pectin is facilitated by charged oxygen groups on pure pectin fragments and charged residues on the ECM of WAKs.

Pectinase, an enzyme responsible for degrading pectin present in the cell wall releases WAKs, this became the primary suggestion that WAKs are bound to pectin within the cell wall. Additionally, this hypothesis suggested a covalent bond between pectin and WAKs as they are still bound to each other after exposure to the detergent Sodium Dodecyl Sulfate (a detergent) and Dithiothreitol (DTT) and in acrylamide gels. Pectin methyl-esterases (PMEs) remove methyl groups arising from the enzyme which polymerizes pectins (methyl esterified α- (1–4) D-galacturonic acid polymer) resulting in a de-esterified pectin polymer. WAKs bind more readily to de-esterified pectins due to their more negative charge. This suggestion that charge is responsible for the preferable binding of WAKs to de-esterified pectins (negatively charged) was shown in a mutation in cationic residues in a WAK1 gene to neutral residues which resulted to the loss of binding properties to the de-esterified pectins.

This role of charge in binding is further proved through a substitution of arginine residues for glutamine and lysine for threonines within the ECM that showing a reduced binding to the de-esterified pectin. De-esterification of pectins is therefore a need for the activation of WAKs.

=== Molecular interactions of WAKs and pectin ===
==== Model ====
The binding of WAKs to pectins trigger the functioning of several pathways. Fragmentation of pectins (oligogalacturonic acid) during wounding or pathogenic attack results in a plant stress response, and WAKs play a role in the mediation of that response. However, since WAKs are also required for cell growth by binding to long pectin polymers for plant development and also pectin fragments for wounding response, no means has been found as to how WAKs differentiates between the two types of pectins to either initiate cell elongation or protection. However, a model was proposed to demonstrate the preference of WAKs for de-esterified pectins and a possible explanation for initiating pathogen response rather than growth response.

A dominant WAKs allele that requires a pectin binding domain and kinase activity was shown to induce a stress response, however, this allele was suppressed with a null allele of pectin methyl-esterase (pme) which prevented the removal of the methyl groups that polymerize pectin to a de-esterified polymer hence resulting in an esterified pectin. Since WAKs is bound more loosely in esterified pectins, more was present to bind oligogalacturonic acids (in this mutant) thereby inducing a pathogen stress response rather than a growth response. WAKs dependent activation of a cell expansion pathway includes the activation of MPK3, while a pathogen response shows the activation of both MPK3 and MPK6.

WAK1 and WAK2 are the most expressed protein variants of WAKS out of the five WAKs known in Arabidopsis, however WAK1 is expressed most in the vasculature while WAK2 is also expressed in organ junctions, abscission zones and meristems.

=== WAK1: pathogen response ===
A pathogen's path to infection begins with the cell wall; the proteins that connect the cell wall to the plasma membrane are the initial mediators in the pathogen response. WAK1 is induced in a plant's pathogenic response along with other pathogen-related proteins that function in protection. Wak1 is present in Arabidopsis plant tissue, with WAK1 mRNA expression more abundant in plant stem, leaves than in the roots and its extracellular domain contains epidermal growth repeats that facilitates cell signaling. Heat and salt do not have an effect in WAK1 production within tissues, however wounding is significant as it causes the expression of a WAK1 message by 2,2-dichloroisonicotinic acid (INA), a natural salicylate (SA) in the signal transduction pathway in the plant response to infection. Since WAK1 is vital to the survival of a plant in response to pathogens, it simultaneously confers resistant to SA to a point where the plant can survive exposure to high levels of SA. Increased resistance to SA through WAK1 expression can only be conferred through ectopic expression of an entire WAK1 protein or kinase domain. This ultimately means that inducing WAK1 expression causes decreased SA levels and a reduced toxicity, hence protection, demonstrating a role of WAK1 in regulating pathogenic attacks.

=== WAK2: pectin and gene expression ===
Pectin affects the expression of WAK2 dependent genes such as those involved in cell wall integrity and external response; WAK2 is suggested to be important in cellular events and gene expression in Arabidopsis mesophyll. Gene expression using Affymetrix expression arrays with RNA from wild-type or wak2-1 (null mutation) protoplasts treated or not treated with pectin reveals a variety of things. In pectin-treated wild type protoplasts, there was a change in the expression of over 200 genes, with almost 50 of the upregulated genes being those involved in cell-wall synthesis such as pectin esterase, leucine-rich transmembrane kinase, plant defensin. The remainder of the downregulated genes comprised those involved in multiple functions through the plant; however, only one gene in the pectin-treated WAK2-1 was differentially expressed. In comparison to wak2-1, 13 out of the 50 upregulated genes in the wild-type was suppressed in wak2-1 and 37 were expressed similarly to the wild type. 20 genes within those downregulated showed reduced expression in wak2-1 cells, 24 were activated and the remainder had levels similar to the wild type.

These patterns allowed identification of genes regulated by WAK2 without pectin treatment, those independent of WAK2 but dependent in the WAK2 pectin response. WAK2 expression in wak2-1 (null mutation) showed the greatest reduction in expression indicating that the gene was not transcribed . WAK1 and WAK2 were upregulated in pectin-treated wild-types but this was not observed in the wak2-1. Evidently, WAK2 is an important component of the pectin signaling pathway, as the absence of WAK2 can amply reduce the transcriptional response to pectin. Both upregulated and downregulated WAK2-dependent pectin-response genes are either related to defense, cell wall structure, protein phosphorylation related or transcription factors.
