= (deoxy)nucleoside-phosphate kinase =

Class of enzymes

Identifiers
- EC no.: 2.7.4.13
- CAS no.: 37278-20-9

Databases
- IntEnz: IntEnz view
- BRENDA: BRENDA entry
- ExPASy: NiceZyme view
- KEGG: KEGG entry
- MetaCyc: metabolic pathway
- PRIAM: profile
- PDB structures: RCSB PDB PDBe PDBsum
- Gene Ontology: AmiGO / QuickGO
Search
- PMC: articles
- PubMed: articles
- NCBI: proteins

In enzymology, a (deoxy)nucleoside-phosphate kinase (EC 2.7.4.13) is an enzyme that catalyzes the chemical reaction

ATP + deoxynucleoside phosphate $\rightleftharpoons$ ADP + deoxynucleoside diphosphate

Thus, the two substrates of this enzyme are ATP and deoxynucleoside phosphate, whereas its two products are ADP and deoxynucleoside diphosphate.

This enzyme belongs to the family of transferases, specifically those transferring phosphorus-containing groups (phosphotransferases) with a phosphate group as acceptor. The systematic name of this enzyme class is ATP:deoxynucleoside-phosphate phosphotransferase. Other names in common use include deoxynucleoside monophosphate kinase, deoxyribonucleoside monophosphokinase, and deoxynucleoside-5'-monophosphate kinase.

== Structural studies ==
As of late 2007, two structures have been solved for this class of enzymes, with PDB accession codes 1DEK and 1DEL.
