= Nucleoside-phosphate kinase =

nucleoside phosphate kinase

Identifiers
- EC no.: 2.7.4.4
- CAS no.: 9026-50-0

Databases
- BRENDA: enzyme data
- ExPASy: NiceZyme view
- KEGG: enzyme entry
- MetaCyc: metabolic pathway
- Rhea: reactions
- PDB structures: RCSB PDB PDBe PDBsum
- Gene Ontology: AmiGO / QuickGO
Search
- PMC: articles
- PubMed: articles
- NCBI: proteins

In enzymology, a nucleoside-phosphate kinase (EC 2.7.4.4) is an enzyme that catalyzes the chemical reaction

ATP + nucleoside phosphate $\rightleftharpoons$ ADP + nucleoside diphosphate

Thus, the two substrates of this enzyme are ATP and nucleoside monophosphate, whereas its two products are ADP and nucleoside diphosphate.

This enzyme belongs to the family of transferases, specifically those transferring phosphorus-containing groups (phosphotransferases) with a phosphate group as acceptor. The systematic name of this enzyme class is ATP:nucleoside-phosphate phosphotransferase. This enzyme is also called NMP-kinase, or nucleoside-monophosphate kinase.

== Structure ==
A number of crystal structures have been solved for this class of enzymes, revealing that they share a common ATP binding domain. This section of the enzyme is commonly referred to as the P-loop, in reference to its interaction with the phosphoryl groups on ATP. This binding domain also consists of a β sheet flanked by α helices.

The [P-loop] typically has the amino acid sequence of Gly-X-X-X-X-Gly-Lys. Similar sequences are found in many other nucleotide-binding proteins.

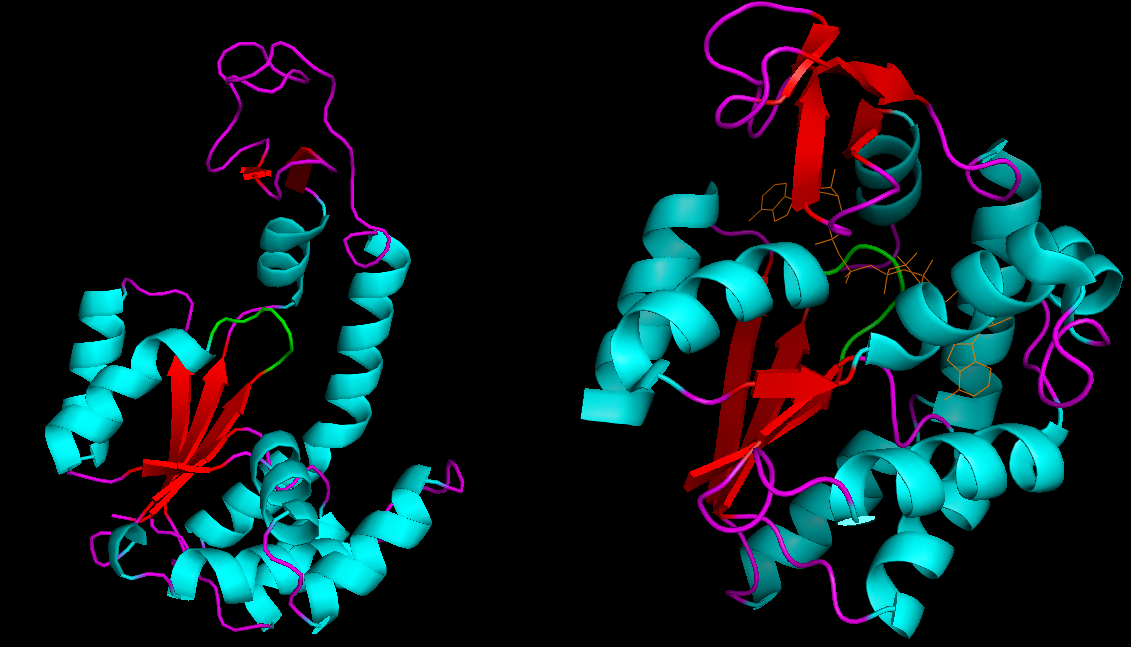
Adenylate kinase, an example nucleoside-phosphate kinase, is shown here in both an open, unbound conformation (left) and with the lid domain closed around Ap5A (right). The P-loop is shown here in green while Ap5A is orange.

== Mechanism ==
=== Metal ion interaction ===
To allow for interaction with this class of enzymes, ATP must first bind to a metal ion such as magnesium or manganese. The metal ion forms a complex with the phosphoryl-group, as well as several water molecules. These water molecules then form hydrogen bonds to a conserved aspartate residue on the enzyme.

The metal ion interaction facilitates binding by holding the ATP molecule in a position allowing for specific binding to the active site and by providing additional points for binding between the substrate and the enzyme. This increases the binding energy.

=== Conformational changes ===
Binding of ATP causes the P-loop to move, in turn making the lid domain lower and secure the ATP in place. Nucleoside monophosphate binding induces further changes that render the enzyme catalytically capable of facilitating a transfer of the phosphoryl group from ATP to nucleoside monophosphate.

The necessity of these conformational changes prevents the wasteful hydrolysis of ATP.

This enzyme mechanism is an example of catalysis by approximation: the nucleoside-phosphate kinase binds the substrates to bring them together in the correct position for the phosphoryl group to be transferred.

== Biological function ==
Similar catalytic domains are present in a variety of proteins, including:

- ATP synthase
- Myosin, and other molecular motor proteins
- G protein and other proteins involved in signal transduction
- Helicases for unwinding DNA and RNA
- Pyrimidine metabolism

== Evolution ==
When a phylogenetic tree composed of members of the nucleoside-phosphate kinase family was made, it showed that these enzymes had originally diverged from a common ancestor into long and short varieties. This first change was drastic – the three-dimensional structure of the lid domain changed significantly.

Following the evolution of long and short varieties of NMP-kinases, smaller changes in the amino acid sequences resulted in the differentiation of subcellular localization.
