= STK38 =

Protein-coding gene in the species Homo sapiens

Identifiers
- Aliases: STK38, NDR, NDR1, serine/threonine kinase 38
- External IDs: OMIM: 606964; MGI: 2442572; GeneCards: STK38
Available structures
PDB	Ortholog search: PDBe RCSB
PDB	List of PDB id codes 1PSB
Enzyme activity
EC #	BRENDA	ExPASy	KEGG	MetaCyc
2.7.11.1	↗	↗	↗	↗

Gene location (Human)
Chr.	Chromosome 6 (human)
Band	6p21.31	Start	36,493,892 bp
Band	6p21.31	End	36,547,479 bp

Gene location (Mouse)
Chr.	Chromosome 17 (mouse)
Band	17|17 A3.3	Start	29,189,854 bp
Band	17|17 A3.3	End	29,226,969 bp
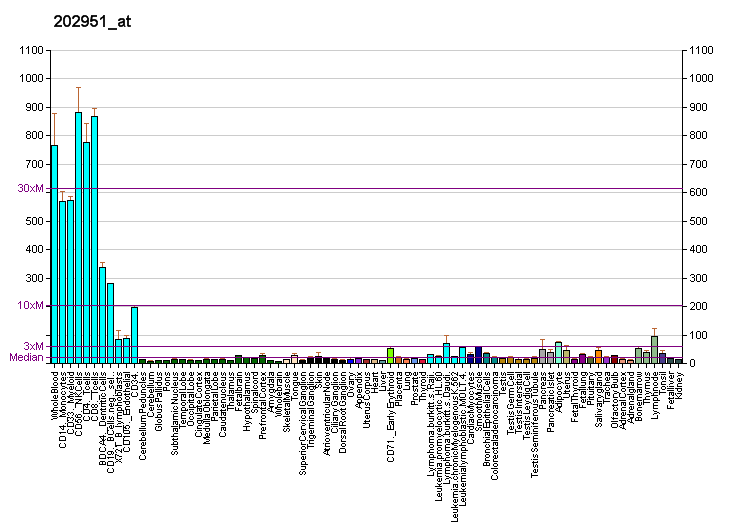
RNA expression pattern
Bgee	Human / Mouse (ortholog); Top expressed in: palpebral conjunctiva; oocyte; secondary oocyte; granulocyte; nasal epithelium; amniotic fluid; epithelium of nasopharynx; mononuclear cell; monocyte; mucosa of paranasal sinus / Top expressed in: granulocyte; conjunctival fornix; thymus; blood; lacrimal gland; submandibular gland; spleen; body of femur; medullary collecting duct; ventricular zone; More reference expression data
BioGPS	More reference expression data
Gene ontology
Molecular function	mitogen-activated protein kinase kinase kinase binding; transferase activity; nucleotide binding; protein kinase activity; protein serine/threonine kinase activity; protein binding; ATP binding; magnesium ion binding; metal ion binding; kinase activity; cadherin binding
Cellular component	cytoplasm; nucleus; cytosol
Biological process	protein phosphorylation; intracellular signal transduction; peptidyl-serine phosphorylation; negative regulation of MAP kinase activity; phosphorylation
Sources:Amigo / QuickGO
Orthologs
Databases	NCBI: entry; OMA: entry
Species	Human	Mouse
Entrez	11329	106504
Ensembl	ENSG00000112079	ENSMUSG00000024006
UniProt	Q15208	Q91VJ4
RefSeq (mRNA)	NM_001305102; NM_007271	NM_134115; NM_001357173
RefSeq (protein)	NP_001292031; NP_009202	NP_598876; NP_001344102
Location (UCSC)	Chr 6: 36.49 – 36.55 Mb	Chr 17: 29.19 – 29.23 Mb
PubMed search
- Wikidata
View/Edit Human	View/Edit Mouse

Serine/threonine-protein kinase 38 is an enzyme that in humans is encoded by the STK38 gene.
