= Carboxypeptidase M =

CPM
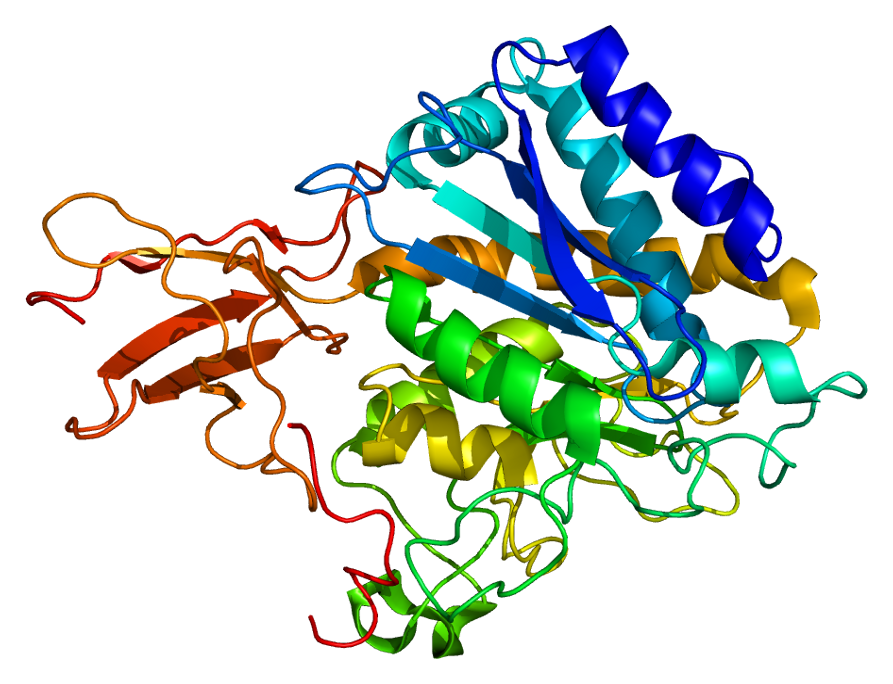

Identifiers
- Aliases: CPM, carboxypeptidase M, Carboxypeptidase M
- External IDs: OMIM: 114860; MGI: 1917824; GeneCards: CPM
Available structures
PDB	Ortholog search: PDBe RCSB
PDB	List of PDB id codes 1UWY
Enzyme activity
EC #	BRENDA	ExPASy	KEGG	MetaCyc
3.4.17.12	↗	↗	↗	↗

Gene location (Human)
Chr.	Chromosome 12 (human)
Band	12q15	Start	68,842,197 bp
Band	12q15	End	68,971,570 bp

Gene location (Mouse)
Chr.	Chromosome 10 (mouse)
Band	10|10 D2	Start	117,465,405 bp
Band	10|10 D2	End	117,523,257 bp
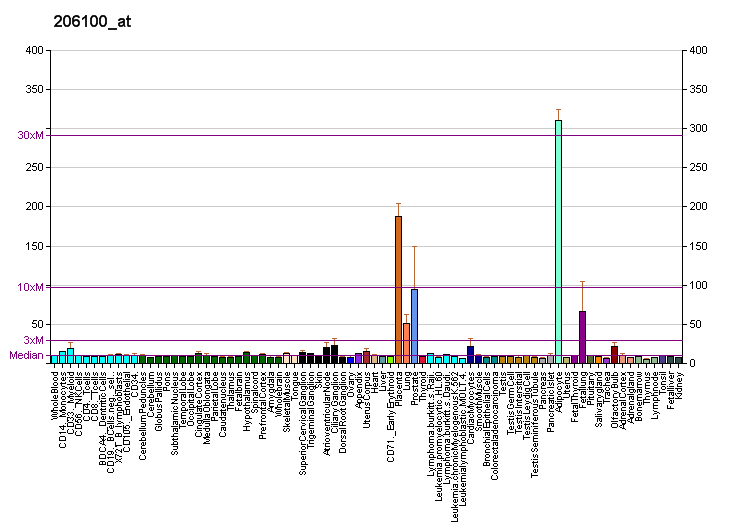
RNA expression pattern
Bgee	Human / Mouse (ortholog); Top expressed in: lower lobe of lung; subcutaneous adipose tissue; right lung; visceral pleura; mucosa of sigmoid colon; rectum; abdominal fat; placenta; upper lobe of lung; corpus callosum / Top expressed in: left lung lobe; seminal vesicula; lumbar subsegment of spinal cord; vestibular membrane of cochlear duct; right lung lobe; olfactory system; olfactory epithelium; skin of external ear; hand; lip; More reference expression data
BioGPS	More reference expression data
Gene ontology
Molecular function	carboxypeptidase activity; peptidase activity; zinc ion binding; hydrolase activity; metallopeptidase activity; metal ion binding; metallocarboxypeptidase activity; serine-type carboxypeptidase activity
Cellular component	anchored component of membrane; cell surface; plasma membrane; extracellular exosome; membrane; extracellular region; extracellular space
Biological process	protein processing; anatomical structure morphogenesis; proteolysis; peptide metabolic process; C-terminal protein lipidation
Sources:Amigo / QuickGO
Orthologs
Databases	NCBI: entry; OMA: entry
Species	Human	Mouse
Entrez	1368	70574
Ensembl	ENSG00000135678	ENSMUSG00000020183
UniProt	P14384	Q80V42
RefSeq (mRNA)	NM_001005502; NM_001874; NM_198320	NM_027468
RefSeq (protein)	NP_001005502; NP_001865; NP_938079	NP_081744
Location (UCSC)	Chr 12: 68.84 – 68.97 Mb	Chr 10: 117.47 – 117.52 Mb
PubMed search
- Wikidata
View/Edit Human	View/Edit Mouse

Carboxypeptidase M

Identifiers
- EC no.: 3.4.17.12
- CAS no.: 120038-28-0

Databases
- BRENDA: enzyme data
- ExPASy: NiceZyme view
- KEGG: enzyme entry
- MetaCyc: metabolic pathway
- Rhea: reactions
- PDB structures: RCSB PDB PDBe PDBsum
Search
- PMC: articles
- PubMed: articles
- NCBI: proteins

Carboxypeptidase M (EC 3.4.17.12) is an enzyme that in humans is encoded by the CPM gene.

== Function ==
Carboxypeptidase M is a membrane-bound arginine/lysine carboxypeptidase. This enzyme catalyses cleavage of C-terminal arginine or lysine residues from polypeptides. Its expression is associated with monocyte to macrophage differentiation. This encoded protein contains hydrophobic regions at the amino and carboxy termini and has 6 potential asparagine-linked glycosylation sites. The active site residues of carboxypeptidases A and B are conserved in this protein. Three alternatively spliced transcript variants encoding the same protein have been described for this gene.
