= Nucleoside-triphosphate—adenylate kinase =

nucleoside triphosphate adenylate kinase

Identifiers
- EC no.: 2.7.4.10
- CAS no.: 9026-74-8

Databases
- IntEnz: IntEnz view
- BRENDA: BRENDA entry
- ExPASy: NiceZyme view
- KEGG: KEGG entry
- MetaCyc: metabolic pathway
- PRIAM: profile
- PDB structures: RCSB PDB PDBe PDBsum
- Gene Ontology: AmiGO / QuickGO
Search
- PMC: articles
- PubMed: articles
- NCBI: proteins

In enzymology, a nucleoside-triphosphate-adenylate kinase (EC 2.7.4.10) is an enzyme that catalyzes the chemical reaction

nucleoside triphosphate + AMP $\rightleftharpoons$ nucleoside diphosphate + ADP

Thus, the two substrates of this enzyme are nucleoside triphosphate and AMP, whereas its two products are nucleoside diphosphate and ADP.

This enzyme belongs to the family of transferases, specifically those transferring phosphorus-containing groups (phosphotransferases) with a phosphate group as acceptor. The systematic name of this enzyme class is nucleoside-triphosphate:AMP phosphotransferase. Other names in common use include guanosine triphosphate-adenylate kinase, nucleoside triphosphate-adenosine monophosphate transphosphorylase, GTP:AMP phosphotransferase, and isozyme 3 of adenylate kinase. This enzyme participates in pyrimidine metabolism.

== Structural studies ==
As of late 2007, two structures have been solved for this class of enzymes, with PDB accession codes 1ZD8 and 2AK3.
