= STK38L =

Protein-coding gene in the species Homo sapiens

Identifiers
- Aliases: STK38L, NDR2, serine/threonine kinase 38 like
- External IDs: OMIM: 615836; MGI: 1922250; GeneCards: STK38L
Available structures
PDB	Ortholog search: PDBe RCSB
PDB	List of PDB id codes 1PSB
Enzyme activity
EC #	BRENDA	ExPASy	KEGG	MetaCyc
2.7.11.1	↗	↗	↗	↗

Gene location (Human)
Chr.	Chromosome 12 (human)
Band	12p11.23	Start	27,243,968 bp
Band	12p11.23	End	27,325,959 bp

Gene location (Mouse)
Chr.	Chromosome 6 (mouse)
Band	6|6 G3	Start	146,626,493 bp
Band	6|6 G3	End	146,680,310 bp
RNA expression pattern
Bgee	Human / Mouse (ortholog); Top expressed in: ascending aorta; popliteal artery; tibial arteries; Achilles tendon; right coronary artery; Descending thoracic aorta; saphenous vein; left coronary artery; epithelium of colon; monocyte / Top expressed in: ascending aorta; aortic valve; left colon; tail of embryo; facial motor nucleus; secondary oocyte; otolith organ; utricle; zygote; blastocyst; More reference expression data
BioGPS	n/a
Gene ontology
Molecular function	kinase activity; transferase activity; nucleotide binding; actin binding; protein serine/threonine kinase activity; protein kinase activity; protein binding; ATP binding; magnesium ion binding; metal ion binding
Cellular component	cytoplasm; cytoskeleton; membrane; actin cytoskeleton; cytosol
Biological process	protein phosphorylation; regulation of cellular component organization; intracellular signal transduction; peptidyl-serine phosphorylation; phosphorylation
Sources:Amigo / QuickGO
Orthologs
Databases	NCBI: entry; OMA: entry
Species	Human	Mouse
Entrez	23012	232533
Ensembl	ENSG00000211455	ENSMUSG00000001630
UniProt	Q9Y2H1	Q7TSE6
RefSeq (mRNA)	NM_015000	NM_172734; NM_001346666
RefSeq (protein)	NP_055815	NP_001333595; NP_766322
Location (UCSC)	Chr 12: 27.24 – 27.33 Mb	Chr 6: 146.63 – 146.68 Mb
PubMed search
- Wikidata
View/Edit Human	View/Edit Mouse

Serine/threonine-protein kinase 38-like is an enzyme that in humans is encoded by the STK38L gene.
