= Phosphatidylinositol-4-phosphate 3-kinase =

phosphatidylinositol-4-phosphate 3-kinase

Identifiers
- EC no.: 2.7.1.154

Databases
- IntEnz: IntEnz view
- BRENDA: BRENDA entry
- ExPASy: NiceZyme view
- KEGG: KEGG entry
- MetaCyc: metabolic pathway
- PRIAM: profile
- PDB structures: RCSB PDB PDBe PDBsum
- Gene Ontology: AmiGO / QuickGO
Search
- PMC: articles
- PubMed: articles
- NCBI: proteins

In enzymology, a phosphatidylinositol-4-phosphate 3-kinase (EC 2.7.1.154) is an enzyme that catalyzes the chemical reaction

ATP + 1-phosphatidyl-1D-myo-inositol 4-phosphate $\rightleftharpoons$ ADP + 1-phosphatidyl-1D-myo-inositol 3,4-bisphosphate

Thus, the two substrates of this enzyme are ATP and 1-phosphatidyl-1D-myo-inositol 4-phosphate, whereas its two products are ADP and 1-phosphatidyl-1D-myo-inositol 3,4-bisphosphate.

This enzyme belongs to the family of transferases, specifically those transferring phosphorus-containing groups (phosphotransferases) with an alcohol group as acceptor. The systematic name of this enzyme class is ATP:1-phosphatidyl-1D-myo-inositol-4-phosphate 3-phosphotransferase. Other names in common use include type II phosphoinositide 3-kinase, C2-domain-containing phosphoinositide 3-kinase, and phosphoinositide 3-kinase. This enzyme participates in phosphatidylinositol signaling system.

== Structural studies ==
As of late 2007, 3 structures have been solved for this class of enzymes, with PDB accession codes 2AR5, 2B3R, and 2IWL.
