= Prenyl-diphosphatase =

Enzyme

prenyl-diphosphatase

Identifiers
- EC no.: 3.1.7.1
- CAS no.: 37288-33-8

Databases
- BRENDA: enzyme data
- ExPASy: NiceZyme view
- KEGG: enzyme entry
- MetaCyc: metabolic pathway
- Rhea: reactions
- PDB structures: RCSB PDB PDBe PDBsum
- Gene Ontology: AmiGO / QuickGO
Search
- PMC: articles
- PubMed: articles
- NCBI: proteins

The enzyme prenyl-diphosphatase (EC 3.1.7.1) catalyzes the reaction

prenyl diphosphate + H_{2}O $\rightleftharpoons$ prenol + diphosphate

This enzyme belongs to the family of hydrolases, specifically those acting on diphosphoric monoester bonds. The systematic name is prenyl-diphosphate diphosphohydrolase. Other names in common use include prenyl-pyrophosphatase, prenol pyrophosphatase, and prenylphosphatase.
