= Aspartyl aminopeptidase =

Class of enzymes

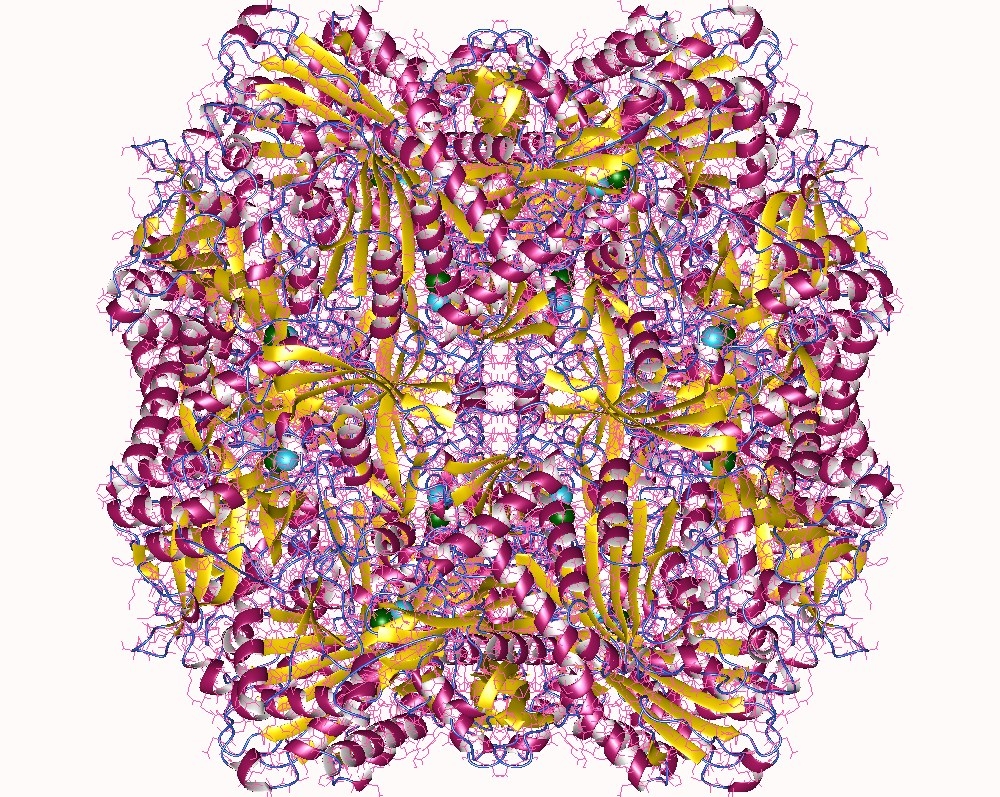
- Aspartyl aminopeptidase dodekamer, Bos taurus

Identifiers
- EC no.: 3.4.11.21
- CAS no.: 9074-83-3

Databases
- IntEnz: IntEnz view
- BRENDA: BRENDA entry
- ExPASy: NiceZyme view
- KEGG: KEGG entry
- MetaCyc: metabolic pathway
- PRIAM: profile
- PDB structures: RCSB PDB PDBe PDBsum
Search
- PMC: articles
- PubMed: articles
- NCBI: proteins

Aspartyl aminopeptidase (EC 3.4.11.21) is an enzyme. This enzyme catalyses the following chemical reaction

Release of an N-terminal aspartate or glutamate from a peptide, with a preference for aspartate

Aminoacyl-arylamides are poor substrates.
