= HycI peptidase =

Enzyme

Identifiers
- EC no.: 3.4.23.51

Databases
- IntEnz: IntEnz view
- BRENDA: BRENDA entry
- ExPASy: NiceZyme view
- KEGG: KEGG entry
- MetaCyc: metabolic pathway
- PRIAM: profile
- PDB structures: RCSB PDB PDBe PDBsum
Search
- PMC: articles
- PubMed: articles
- NCBI: proteins

HycI peptidase (EC 3.4.23.51, HycI, HycE processing protein) is an enzyme. This enzyme catalyses the following chemical reaction

This enzyme specifically removes a 32-amino acid peptide from the C-terminus of the precursor of the large subunit of hydrogenase 3 in Escherichia coli by cleavage at the C-terminal side of Arg^{537}.

This enzyme belongs to the peptidase family A31.
