= Nucleoside phosphoacylhydrolase =

Class of enzymes

Identifiers
- EC no.: 3.6.1.24
- CAS no.: 37289-35-3

Databases
- IntEnz: IntEnz view
- BRENDA: BRENDA entry
- ExPASy: NiceZyme view
- KEGG: KEGG entry
- MetaCyc: metabolic pathway
- PRIAM: profile
- PDB structures: RCSB PDB PDBe PDBsum
Search
- PMC: articles
- PubMed: articles
- NCBI: proteins

In enzymology, a nucleoside phosphoacylhydrolase (EC 3.6.1.24) is an enzyme that catalyzes the chemical reaction

Hydrolyses mixed phospho-anhydride bonds

This enzyme belongs to the family of hydrolases, specifically those acting on acid anhydrides in phosphorus-containing anhydrides. The systematic name of this enzyme class is nucleoside-5'-phosphoacylate acylhydrolase.
