= Dolichylphosphate-mannose phosphodiesterase =

dolichylphosphate-mannose phosphodiesterase

Identifiers
- EC no.: 3.1.4.49
- CAS no.: 111839-07-7

Databases
- IntEnz: IntEnz view
- BRENDA: BRENDA entry
- ExPASy: NiceZyme view
- KEGG: KEGG entry
- MetaCyc: metabolic pathway
- PRIAM: profile
- PDB structures: RCSB PDB PDBe PDBsum
- Gene Ontology: AmiGO / QuickGO
Search
- PMC: articles
- PubMed: articles
- NCBI: proteins

The enzyme dolichylphosphate-mannose phosphodiesterase (EC 3.1.4.49) catalyzes the reaction

dolichyl β-D-mannosyl phosphate + H_{2}O $\rightleftharpoons$ dolichyl phosphate + D-mannose

This enzyme belongs to the family of hydrolases, specifically those acting on phosphoric diester bonds. The systematic name is dolichyl-β-D-mannosyl-phosphate dolichylphosphohydrolase. This enzyme is also called mannosylphosphodolichol phosphodiesterase.
