= Fatty-acyl-CoA-transporting ATPase =

Class of enzymes

peroxisomal fatty acyl CoA transporter

Identifiers
- EC no.: 7.6.2.4

Databases
- IntEnz: IntEnz view
- BRENDA: BRENDA entry
- ExPASy: NiceZyme view
- KEGG: KEGG entry
- MetaCyc: metabolic pathway
- PRIAM: profile
- PDB structures: RCSB PDB PDBe PDBsum
- Gene Ontology: AmiGO / QuickGO
Search
- PMC: articles
- PubMed: articles
- NCBI: proteins

In enzymology, a fatty-acyl-CoA-transporting ATPase (EC 7.6.2.4) is an enzyme that catalyzes the chemical reaction

ATP + H_{2}O + fatty acyl CoAcis $\rightleftharpoons$ ADP + phosphate + fatty acyl CoAtrans

The 3 substrates of this enzyme are ATP, H_{2}O, and fatty acyl CoAcis, whereas its 3 products are ADP, phosphate, and fatty acyl CoAtrans.

This enzyme belongs to the family of hydrolases, specifically those acting on acid anhydrides to catalyse transmembrane movement of substances. The systematic name of this enzyme class is ATP phosphohydrolase (fatty-acyl-CoA-transporting).
