= Palmitoyl-CoA hydrolase =

palmitoyl-CoA hydrolase

Identifiers
- EC no.: 3.1.2.2
- CAS no.: 9025-87-0

Databases
- IntEnz: IntEnz view
- BRENDA: BRENDA entry
- ExPASy: NiceZyme view
- KEGG: KEGG entry
- MetaCyc: metabolic pathway
- PRIAM: profile
- PDB structures: RCSB PDB PDBe PDBsum
- Gene Ontology: AmiGO / QuickGO
Search
- PMC: articles
- PubMed: articles
- NCBI: proteins

Palmitoyl-CoA hydrolase (EC 3.1.2.2) is an enzyme in the family of hydrolases that specifically acts on thioester bonds. It catalyzes the hydrolysis of long chain fatty acyl thioesters of acyl carrier protein or coenzyme A to form free fatty acid and the corresponding thiol:

palmitoyl-CoA + H_{2}O = CoA + palmitate

It has a strict specificity for thioesters with a chain link greater than C_{10}.

These enzymes are localized in almost all cellular compartments, such as endoplasmic reticulum, cytosol, mitochondria, and peroxisomes. They are highly regulated by peroxisome proliferator activated receptors, which led to their involvement in lipid metabolism. The enzyme is up-regulated during times of increased fatty acid oxidation, which suggests that this enzyme has a potential role the peroxisomal beta-oxidation.

The systematic name is palmitoyl-CoA hydrolase. Other names in common use include long-chain fatty-acyl-CoA hydrolase, palmitoyl coenzyme A hydrolase, palmitoyl thioesterase, palmitoyl coenzyme A hydrolase, palmitoyl-CoA deacylase, palmityl thioesterase, palmityl-CoA deacylase, fatty acyl thioesterase I, and palmityl thioesterase I.

== Structural studies ==
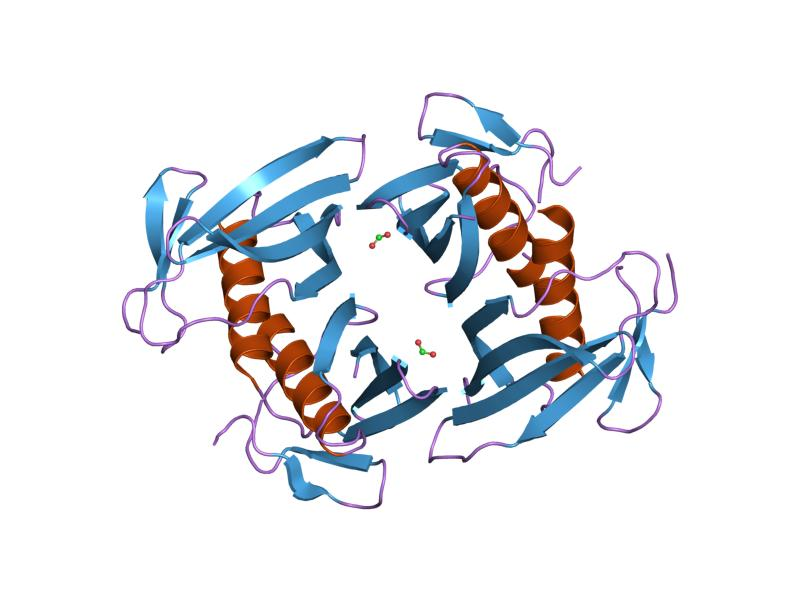
Crystal structure of n-terminal domain of yeast peroxisomal thioesterase-1.

As of late 2007, 3 structures have been solved for this class of enzymes, with PDB accession codes 1TBU, 2Q2B, and 2QQ2.

== Mechanism ==
At a subcellular level, palmitoyl-CoA hydrolase is localized in the endoplasmic reticulum, cytosol, mitochondria, and peroxisomes. Studies have shown that in rats that are fed high fat diets, palmitoyl-CoA hydrolase activity in the liver increased. While the details of the mechanism are not known, the results suggest that there is an "induction" mechanism taking place for palmitoyl-CoA hydrolase and peroxisomal beta-oxidation enzymes.

== Disease Relevance ==
Diabetes is the most common cause of liver disease in the U.S., type 2 diabetes. Studies have been done to show that, while there is not direct correlation between palmitoyl-CoA hydrolase and diabetes, streptozotocin-induced diabetes significantly decreased rat liver palmitoyl-CoA hydrolase. This led to high levels of fatty acyl-CoA being present in the liver, which shows that a diseased liver cannot regulate the amount of fatty acyl-CoA that is present versus a normal, healthy liver. A defect in acyl-CoA degradation in livers can produce hyperammonemia and hypoglycemia.
