= Ribonuclease (poly-(U)-specific) =

Identifiers
- EC no.: 3.1.26.9

Databases
- IntEnz: IntEnz view
- BRENDA: BRENDA entry
- ExPASy: NiceZyme view
- KEGG: KEGG entry
- MetaCyc: metabolic pathway
- PRIAM: profile
- PDB structures: RCSB PDB PDBe PDBsum
Search
- PMC: articles
- PubMed: articles
- NCBI: proteins

Ribonuclease (poly-(U)-specific) (EC 3.1.26.9, ribonuclease (uracil-specific), uracil-specific endoribonuclease, uracil-specific RNase) is an enzyme. This enzyme catalyses the following chemical reaction

Endonucleolytic cleavage of poly(U) to fragments terminated by 3'-hydroxy and 5'-phosphate groups

This enzyme forms oligonucleotides with chain lengths of 6 to 12.
