= Alpha-amino-acid esterase =

α-amino-acid esterase

Identifiers
- EC no.: 3.1.1.43
- CAS no.: 74506-40-4

Databases
- IntEnz: IntEnz view
- BRENDA: BRENDA entry
- ExPASy: NiceZyme view
- KEGG: KEGG entry
- MetaCyc: metabolic pathway
- PRIAM: profile
- PDB structures: RCSB PDB PDBe PDBsum
- Gene Ontology: AmiGO / QuickGO
Search
- PMC: articles
- PubMed: articles
- NCBI: proteins

The enzyme α-amino-acid esterase (EC 3.1.1.43) catalyzes the reaction

an α-amino acid ester + H_{2}O $\rightleftharpoons$ an α-amino acid + an alcohol

This enzyme belongs to the family of hydrolases, specifically those acting on carboxylic ester bonds. The systematic name is α-amino-acid-ester aminoacylhydrolase. This enzyme is also called α-amino acid ester hydrolase.

== Structural studies ==
As of late 2007, 5 structures have been solved for this class of enzymes, with PDB accession codes 1MPX, 1NX9, 1RYY, 2B4K, and 2B9V.
