= Aspergillus deoxyribonuclease K1 =

Identifiers
- EC no.: 3.1.22.2
- CAS no.: 264922-12-5

Databases
- IntEnz: IntEnz view
- BRENDA: BRENDA entry
- ExPASy: NiceZyme view
- KEGG: KEGG entry
- MetaCyc: metabolic pathway
- PRIAM: profile
- PDB structures: RCSB PDB PDBe PDBsum
Search
- PMC: articles
- PubMed: articles
- NCBI: proteins

Aspergillus deoxyribonuclease K1 (EC 3.1.22.2, Aspergillus DNase K1) is an enzyme. This enzyme catalyses the following chemical reaction

Endonucleolytic cleavage to nucleoside 3'-phosphates and 3'-phosphooligonucleotide end-products

This enzyme has preference for single-stranded DNA.
