= Venom exonuclease =

Identifiers
- EC no.: 3.1.15.1
- CAS no.: 9025-82-5

Databases
- IntEnz: IntEnz view
- BRENDA: BRENDA entry
- ExPASy: NiceZyme view
- KEGG: KEGG entry
- MetaCyc: metabolic pathway
- PRIAM: profile
- PDB structures: RCSB PDB PDBe PDBsum
Search
- PMC: articles
- PubMed: articles
- NCBI: proteins

Venom exonuclease (EC 3.1.15.1, venom phosphodiesterase) is an enzyme. This enzyme catalyses the following chemical reaction

Exonucleolytic cleavage in the 3'- to 5'- direction to yield nucleoside 5'-phosphates (exonuclease type a)

This enzyme has preference for single-stranded substrate.
