= Peptidyl-glutaminase =

Enzyme

peptidyl-glutaminase

Identifiers
- EC no.: 3.5.1.43
- CAS no.: 37228-70-9

Databases
- IntEnz: IntEnz view
- BRENDA: BRENDA entry
- ExPASy: NiceZyme view
- KEGG: KEGG entry
- MetaCyc: metabolic pathway
- PRIAM: profile
- PDB structures: RCSB PDB PDBe PDBsum
- Gene Ontology: AmiGO / QuickGO
Search
- PMC: articles
- PubMed: articles
- NCBI: proteins

In enzymology, a peptidyl-glutaminase (EC 3.5.1.43) is an enzyme that catalyzes the chemical reaction

alpha-N-peptidyl-L-glutamine + H_{2}O $\rightleftharpoons$ alpha-N-peptidyl-L-glutamate + NH_{3}

Thus, the two substrates of this enzyme are alpha-N-peptidyl-L-glutamine and H_{2}O, whereas its two products are alpha-N-peptidyl-L-glutamate and NH_{3}.

This enzyme belongs to the family of hydrolases, those acting on carbon-nitrogen bonds other than peptide bonds, specifically in linear amides. The systematic name of this enzyme class is peptidyl-L-glutamine amidohydrolase. Other names in common use include peptidoglutaminase I, peptideglutaminase, and peptidoglutaminase.
