= Streptomycin-6-phosphatase =

streptomycin-6-phosphatase

Identifiers
- EC no.: 3.1.3.39
- CAS no.: 9055-33-8

Databases
- IntEnz: IntEnz view
- BRENDA: BRENDA entry
- ExPASy: NiceZyme view
- KEGG: KEGG entry
- MetaCyc: metabolic pathway
- PRIAM: profile
- PDB structures: RCSB PDB PDBe PDBsum
- Gene Ontology: AmiGO / QuickGO
Search
- PMC: articles
- PubMed: articles
- NCBI: proteins

The enzyme streptomycin-6-phosphatase (EC 3.1.3.39) catalyzes the reaction

streptomycin 6-phosphate + H_{2}O $\rightleftharpoons$ streptomycin + phosphate

This enzyme belongs to the family of hydrolases, specifically those acting on phosphoric monoester bonds. The systematic name is streptomycin-6-phosphate phosphohydrolase. Other names in common use include streptomycin 6-phosphate phosphatase, streptomycin 6-phosphate phosphohydrolase, and streptomycin-6-P phosphohydrolase. This enzyme participates in streptomycin biosynthesis.
