= Ste24 endopeptidase =

Identifiers
- EC no.: 3.4.24.84
- CAS no.: 148463-92-7

Databases
- IntEnz: IntEnz view
- BRENDA: BRENDA entry
- ExPASy: NiceZyme view
- KEGG: KEGG entry
- MetaCyc: metabolic pathway
- PRIAM: profile
- PDB structures: RCSB PDB PDBe PDBsum
Search
- PMC: articles
- PubMed: articles
- NCBI: proteins

Ste24 endopeptidase (EC 3.4.24.84) is an enzyme. This enzyme catalyses the following chemical reaction

The peptide bond hydrolysed can be designated -C-aaX in which C is an S-isoprenylated cysteine residue, a is usually aliphatic and X is the C-terminal residue of the substrate protein, and may be any of several amino acids

This enzyme belongs to the peptidase family M48.
