= Ribonuclease alpha =

Identifiers
- EC no.: 3.1.26.2

Databases
- IntEnz: IntEnz view
- BRENDA: BRENDA entry
- ExPASy: NiceZyme view
- KEGG: KEGG entry
- MetaCyc: metabolic pathway
- PRIAM: profile
- PDB structures: RCSB PDB PDBe PDBsum
Search
- PMC: articles
- PubMed: articles
- NCBI: proteins

Ribonuclease alpha (EC 3.1.26.2, 2'-O-methyl RNase) is an enzyme. This enzyme catalyses the following chemical reaction

Endonucleolytic cleavage to 5'-phosphomonoester

This enzyme is specific for O-methylated RNA.
