= N-acetylgalactosaminoglycan deacetylase =

Class of enzymes

Identifiers
- EC no.: 3.1.1.58
- CAS no.: 52410-59-0

Databases
- IntEnz: IntEnz view
- BRENDA: BRENDA entry
- ExPASy: NiceZyme view
- KEGG: KEGG entry
- MetaCyc: metabolic pathway
- PRIAM: profile
- PDB structures: RCSB PDB PDBe PDBsum
- Gene Ontology: AmiGO / QuickGO
Search
- PMC: articles
- PubMed: articles
- NCBI: proteins

The enzyme N-acetylgalactosaminoglycan deacetylase (EC 3.1.1.58) catalyzes the reaction

N-acetyl-D-galactosaminoglycan + H_{2}O $\rightleftharpoons$ D-galactosaminoglycan + acetate

This enzyme belongs to the family of hydrolases, specifically those acting on carboxylic ester bonds. The systematic name is N-acetyl-D-galactosaminoglycan acetylhydrolase. Other names in common use include polysaccharide deacetylase, Vi-polysaccharide deacetylase, and N-acetyl galactosaminoglycan deacetylase.
