= Non-reducing end β-L-arabinopyranosidadase =

β-L-Arabinosidase

Identifiers
- EC no.: 3.2.1.88
- CAS no.: 39361-63-2

Databases
- IntEnz: IntEnz view
- BRENDA: BRENDA entry
- ExPASy: NiceZyme view
- KEGG: KEGG entry
- MetaCyc: metabolic pathway
- PRIAM: profile
- PDB structures: RCSB PDB PDBe PDBsum
- Gene Ontology: AmiGO / QuickGO
Search
- PMC: articles
- PubMed: articles
- NCBI: proteins

The enzyme β-L-arabinosidase (EC 3.2.1.88) catalyzes the following chemical reaction

a β-L-arabinoside + H_{2}O $\rightleftharpoons$ L-arabinose + an alcohol

It belongs to the family of hydrolases, specifically those glycosidases that hydrolyse O- and S-glycosyl compounds. The systematic name is β-L-arabinoside arabinohydrolase. It is also called vicianosidase.
