= Cellulose-polysulfatase =

Identifiers
- EC no.: 3.1.6.7
- CAS no.: 9025-58-5

Databases
- IntEnz: IntEnz view
- BRENDA: BRENDA entry
- ExPASy: NiceZyme view
- KEGG: KEGG entry
- MetaCyc: metabolic pathway
- PRIAM: profile
- PDB structures: RCSB PDB PDBe PDBsum
Search
- PMC: articles
- PubMed: articles
- NCBI: proteins

The enzyme cellulose-polysulfatase (EC 3.1.6.7) catalyzes hydrolysis of the 2- and 3-sulfate groups of the polysulfates of cellulose and charonin.

This enzyme belongs to the family of hydrolases, specifically those acting on sulfuric ester bonds. The systematic name of this enzyme class is cellulose-sulfate sulfohydrolase.
