= Caldesmon-phosphatase =

caldesmon-phosphatase

Identifiers
- EC no.: 3.1.3.55
- CAS no.: 93229-71-1

Databases
- IntEnz: IntEnz view
- BRENDA: BRENDA entry
- ExPASy: NiceZyme view
- KEGG: KEGG entry
- MetaCyc: metabolic pathway
- PRIAM: profile
- PDB structures: RCSB PDB PDBe PDBsum
- Gene Ontology: AmiGO / QuickGO
Search
- PMC: articles
- PubMed: articles
- NCBI: proteins

The enzyme caldesmon-phosphatase (EC 3.1.3.55) catalyzes the reaction

caldesmon phosphate + H_{2}O $\rightleftharpoons$ caldesmon + phosphate

This enzyme belongs to the family of hydrolases, specifically those acting on phosphoric monoester bonds. The systematic name is caldesmon-phosphate phosphohydrolase. Other names in common use include SMP-I, and smooth muscle caldesmon phosphatase.
