= Phosphoenolpyruvate phosphatase =

Enzyme

phosphoenolpyruvate phosphatase

Identifiers
- EC no.: 3.1.3.60
- CAS no.: 122319-89-5

Databases
- IntEnz: IntEnz view
- BRENDA: BRENDA entry
- ExPASy: NiceZyme view
- KEGG: KEGG entry
- MetaCyc: metabolic pathway
- PRIAM: profile
- PDB structures: RCSB PDB PDBe PDBsum
- Gene Ontology: AmiGO / QuickGO
Search
- PMC: articles
- PubMed: articles
- NCBI: proteins

The enzyme phosphoenol pyruvate phosphatase (EC 3.1.3.60) catalyzes the reaction

phosphoenolpyruvate + H_{2}O $\rightleftharpoons$ pyruvate + phosphate

This enzyme belongs to the family of hydrolases, specifically those acting on phosphoric monoester bonds. The systematic name of this enzyme class is phosphoenolpyruvate phosphohydrolase. This enzyme is also called PEP phosphatase.

== Bibliography ==
- Duff SM, Lefebvre DD, Plaxton WC (1989). "Purification and Characterization of a Phosphoenolpyruvate Phosphatase from Brassica nigra Suspension Cells". Plant Physiol. 90 (2): 734–741. doi:10.1104/pp.90.2.734. PMC 1061789. PMID 16666836.
- Malhotra OP; Kayastha AM (1989). "Chemical inactivation and active site groups of phosphoenolpyruvate-phosphatase from germinating mung beans (Vigna radiata)". Plant Sci. 65 (2): 161–170. Bibcode:1989PlnSc..65..161M. doi:10.1016/0168-9452(89)90061-7.
- Malhotra OP; Kayastha AM (1990). "Isolation and Characterization of Phosphoenolpyruvate Phosphatase from Germinating Mung Beans (Vigna radiata)". Plant Physiol. 93 (1): 194–200. doi:10.1104/pp.93.1.194. PMC 1062488. PMID 16667434.
