= Acetylsalicylate deacetylase =

Class of enzymes

Identifiers
- EC no.: 3.1.1.55
- CAS no.: 87348-04-7

Databases
- BRENDA: enzyme data
- ExPASy: NiceZyme view
- KEGG: enzyme entry
- MetaCyc: metabolic pathway
- Rhea: reactions
- PDB structures: RCSB PDB PDBe PDBsum
- Gene Ontology: AmiGO / QuickGO
Search
- PMC: articles
- PubMed: articles
- NCBI: proteins

Acetylsalicylate deacetylase (EC 3.1.1.55) catalyzes the reaction

aspirin
H_{2}O
salicylic acid
+
acetic acid

The enzyme characterised from mammals hydrolyses aspirin to salicylic acid and acetic acid. The reaction is important in the metabolism of aspirin when used as a pharmaceutical drug.

This enzyme is a hydrolase, specifically one acting on carboxylic ester bonds. The systematic name is acetylsalicylate O-acetylhydrolase. Other names in common use include aspirin esterase, acetylsalicylic acid esterase, and aspirin hydrolase.
