= Glucan 1,6-α-glucosidase =

Identifiers
- EC no.: 3.2.1.70
- CAS no.: 37288-48-5

Databases
- IntEnz: IntEnz view
- BRENDA: BRENDA entry
- ExPASy: NiceZyme view
- KEGG: KEGG entry
- MetaCyc: metabolic pathway
- PRIAM: profile
- PDB structures: RCSB PDB PDBe PDBsum
Search
- PMC: articles
- PubMed: articles
- NCBI: proteins

Glucan 1,6-α-glucosidase (EC 3.2.1.70, exo-1,6-β-glucosidase, glucodextrinase, glucan α-1,6-D-glucohydrolase) is an enzyme with systematic name glucan 6-α-D-glucohydrolase. It catalyses the hydrolysis of (1→6)-α-D-glucosidic linkages in (1→6)-α-D-glucans and derived oligosaccharides

Hydrolysis is accompanied by inversion at C-1, so that new reducing ends are released in the β-configuration.
