= Glucosidases =

Enzymes which hydrolyse glycosides

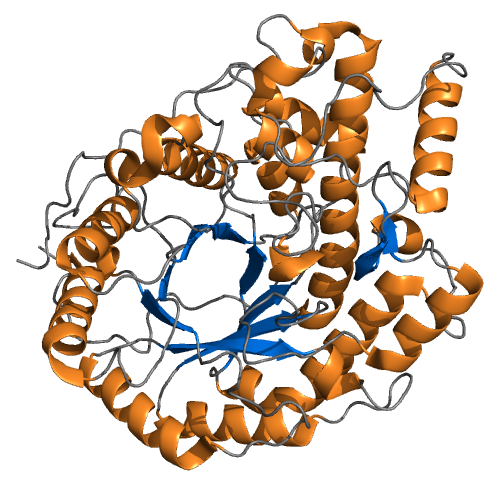
Beta-amylase, a type of glucosidase

Glucosidases are the glycoside hydrolase enzymes categorized under the EC number 3.2.1.

== Function ==
Alpha-glucosidases are enzymes involved in breaking down complex carbohydrates such as starch and glycogen into their monomers.

They catalyze the cleavage of individual glucosyl residues from various glycoconjugates including alpha- or beta-linked polymers of glucose. This enzyme converts complex sugars into simpler ones.

== Members ==
Different sources include different members in this class. Members marked with a "#" are considered by MeSH to be glucosidases.

| Name | EC | Description |
|---|---|---|
| α-Amylase | EC 3.2.1.1 | is a digestive enzyme in mammals |
| β-Amylase | EC 3.2.1.2 | is a plant enzyme to break down starch |
| γ-Amylase | EC 3.2.1.3 | is a digestive enzyme |
| Cellulase # | EC 3.2.1.4 | breaks down cellulose from plant material |
| Sucrase-isomaltase | EC 3.2.1.10 | - |
| Mannosyl-oligosaccharide glucosidase # | EC 3.2.1.106 | catalyzes the first trimming step of the N-glycosylation pathway; is associated with Congenital Disorder of Glycosylation type IIb |
| Acid α-glucosidase # | EC 3.2.1.20 | is associated with Glycogen storage disease type II |
| Beta-glucosidase # | EC 3.2.1.21 | is associated with Gaucher's disease |
| Lactase | EC 3.2.1.23 | one member of the β-galactosidase family, breaks down milk sugars, and its absence in adulthood causes lactose intolerance |
| Debranching enzyme # | EC 3.2.1.33 | in mammals, yeast and some bacteria, combines transferase and glucosidase activity in glycogen breakdown |
| Pullulanase | EC 3.2.1.41 | has been used as a detergent |

== Clinical significance ==
Alpha-glucosidases are targeted by alpha-glucosidase inhibitors such as acarbose and miglitol to control diabetes mellitus type 2.

== See also ==
- DNA glycosylases
- Mucopolysaccharidoses
