= Prevention of type 2 diabetes =

Prevention of type 2 diabetes can be achieved with both lifestyle changes and use of medication. The American Diabetes Association categorizes people with prediabetes, who have glycemic levels higher than normal but do not meet criteria for diabetes, as a high-risk group. Without intervention, people with prediabetes progress to type 2 diabetes with a 5% to 10% rate. Diabetes prevention is achieved through weight loss and increased physical activity, which can reduce the risk of diabetes by 50% to 60%.

== Lifestyle ==
Many interventions to promote healthy lifestyles have been shown to prevent diabetes. A combination of diet and physical activity promotion through counselling and support programs decrease weight, improve systolic blood pressure, improve cholesterol levels and decrease risk of diabetes.

Increasing physical activity may be helpful in preventing type 2 diabetes, particularly if undertaken soon after a carbohydrate-rich meal that increases blood sugar levels. The American Diabetes Association (ADA) recommends maintaining a healthy weight, getting at least 2 1/2 hours of exercise per week (several brisk sustained walks appear sufficient), having a modest fat intake (around 30% of energy supply should come from fat), and eating sufficient fiber (e.g., from whole grains).

Numerous clinical studies have shown that resistant starch increases insulin sensitivity, independent of the glycemic response of the food and may reduce the risk of type 2 diabetes. The U.S. Food and Drug Administration requires claims that resistant starch can reduce the risk of type 2 diabetes to be qualified with a declaration that scientific evidence in support of this claim is limited.

Foods with low glycemic index, rich in fiber and other important nutrients, are recommended, notwithstanding insufficient evidence.

Study group participants whose "physical activity level and dietary, smoking, and alcohol habits were all in the low-risk group had an 82% lower incidence of diabetes".

Various sources suggest an influence of dietary fat types. Positive effects of unsaturated fats have been asserted on theoretical grounds and observed in animal feeding studies. Hydrogenated fats are universally considered harmful, mainly because of their well-known effect on cardiovascular risk factors.

Numerous studies suggest connections between some aspects of type 2 diabetes with ingestion of certain foods or with some drugs. Breastfeeding may also be associated with the prevention of type 2 diabetes in mothers.

Some evidence relates consumption of coffee with prevention of type 2 diabetes. However, it is unclear if coffee causes any change in the risk of diabetes. This is true regardless of if it is caffeinated/decaffeinated, consumed with/without sugar, or potboiled or not.

== Medications ==
Some studies have shown delayed progression to diabetes in predisposed patients through prophylactic use of metformin, rosiglitazone, or valsartan. Lifestyle interventions are, however, more effective than metformin alone at preventing diabetes regardless of weight loss, though evidence suggests that lifestyle interventions and metformin together can be effective treatment in patients who are at a higher risk of developing diabetes.

A Cochrane systematic review assessed the effect of alpha-glucosidase inhibitors in people with impaired glucose tolerance, impaired fasting blood glucose, elevated glycated hemoglobin A1c (HbA1c). It was found that acarbose appeared to reduce incidence of diabetes mellitus type 2 when compared to placebo; however, there was no conclusive evidence that acarbose compared to diet and exercise, metformin, placebo, no intervention improved all-cause mortality, reduced or increased risk of cardiovascular mortality, serious or non-serious adverse events, non-fatal stroke, congestive heart failure, or non-fatal myocardial infarction. The same review found that there was no conclusive evidence that voglibose compared to diet and exercise or placebo reduced incidence of diabetes mellitus type 2, or any of the other measured outcomes.

Many other medications are well known to modify risk of diabetes 2, although in most cases they are prescribed for reasons unrelated to diabetes 2. In patients on hydroxychloroquine for rheumatoid arthritis, incidence of diabetes was reduced by 77%, though causal mechanisms are unclear. Dopamine receptor agonists are also known to improve glycemic control, reduce insulin resistance and help controlling body weight.

== Co-morbidities ==
People with mental health disorders are at a higher risk of developing type 2 diabetes. The most effective way to prevent type 2 diabetes in people with mental disorders is not clear; considerations include pharmacological interventions, behavior changes, and organizational interventions.

== Programmes ==
Several countries have established more and less successful national programmes to improve prevention and treatment of diabetes. In the UK, the NHS's national diabetes prevention programme, Healthier You, offers personalised face-to-face and digital services. Assessment of the programme is ongoing, but based on the first 36,000 patients, it seems that those who complete the programme manage to reduce their blood sugar levels and lose weight. At the same time, only 1 in 5 people complete the whole 9-month programme. A study of 18,470 people who had been referred to the programme found that they had a 20% reduced risk of developing diabetes.
