= Cisterna =

Flattened membrane disk

A cisterna (pl.: cisternae) is a flattened membrane vesicle found in the endoplasmic reticulum and Golgi apparatus. Cisternae are an integral part of the packaging and modification processes of proteins occurring in the Golgi.

== Function ==
Proteins begin on the cis side of the Golgi (the side facing the ER) and exit on the trans side (the side facing the plasma membrane). Throughout their journey in the cisternae, the proteins are packaged and are modified for transport throughout the cell. The number of cisternae in the Golgi stack is dependent on the organism and cell type. The structure, composition, and function of each of the cisternae may be different inside the Golgi stack. These different variations of Golgi cisternae are categorized into three groups; cis Golgi network, medial, and trans Golgi network. The cis Golgi network is the first step in the cisternal structure of a protein being packaged, while the trans Golgi network is the last step in the cisternal structure when the vesicle is being transferred to either the lysosome, the cell surface or the secretory vesicle. The cisternae are shaped by the cytoskeleton of the cell through a lipid bilayer. Post-translational modifications such as glycosylation, phosphorylation and cleavage occur in the Golgi and as proteins travel through it, they go through the cisternae, which allows functional ion channels to be created due to these modifications. Each class of cisternae contains various enzymes used in protein modifications. These enzymes help the Golgi in glycosylation and phosphorylation of proteins, as well as mediate signal modifications to direct proteins to their final destination. Defects in the cisternal enzymes can cause congenital defects including some forms of muscular dystrophy, cystic fibrosis, cancer, and diabetes.

The trans-Golgi network is an important part of the Golgi. It is located on the trans face of the Golgi apparatus and is made up of cisternae. The cisternae play a crucial role in the packaging, modification, and transport functions for the cell overall. The proteins and polysaccharides that get processed here within the cisterna will then be sent to their specified locations.

There are multiple types of cisternae which can be recognized from their distinctions in morphology. These distinctions include enzymes relating to glycosylation that have been identified in cisternae located in different regions of the Golgi. This difference in the localization of enzymes throughout cisternae can contribute to the functioning of the Golgi by regulating the pH, ion concentrations, and the amounts of substrate that are necessary. This also works to make sure that reactions are happening in the correct places within the Golgi and that proteins do not undergo the wrong modification if they are in the wrong location.

This illustration shows where the cisternae can be found on the Golgi apparatus. As well as the location of the cis and trans Golgi network.

The cis Golgi network is the first step in the cisternal structure of a protein being packaged, while the trans Golgi network is the last step in the cisternal structure when the vesicle is being transferred to either the lysosome, the cell surface or the secretory vesicle. The medial cisternae is where the mannose residue and extra N-acetylglucosamine is removed.

== Golgi glycosylation ==
The Golgi apparatus plays a critical role in the modification of proteins through glycosylation, particularly N-linked glycosylation, which is a crucial process for the proper folding, stability, and function of many secretory and membrane-bound proteins. N-linked glycosylation involves the attachment of oligosaccharides to the nitrogen atom of asparagine residues in proteins. These oligosaccharides are composed of various sugar units, including N-acetylglucosamine (GlcNAc), mannose (Man), galactose (Gal), and N-acetylneuraminate (NANA, also known as sialic acid). These glycosylated structures are integral for proper protein function, influencing cellular interactions, protein trafficking, and immune recognition.

N-linked glycosylation begins in the rough endoplasmic reticulum (ER), where a precursor oligosaccharide is synthesized on a lipid carrier called dolichol. The precursor consists of a core structure made up of two N-acetylglucosamine (GlcNAc) residues, nine mannose (Man) residues, and three glucose (Glc) residues. The precursor is then transferred to a protein's asparagine residue as soon as the protein enters the ER lumen. The attachment of the oligosaccharide to the asparagine is catalyzed by the enzyme oligosaccharyltransferase.

Once the glycosylated protein enters the ER, further processing of the oligosaccharide occurs. Three specific enzymes play key roles in this early stage of glycosylation. First, glucosidase I removes one glucose residue from the oligosaccharide. Then, glucosidase II removes two more glucose residues, leaving behind a core oligosaccharide attached to the protein. Finally, a mannosidase enzyme removes one mannose residue. After this initial trimming, the oligosaccharide is ready to move from the ER to the Golgi apparatus for more elaborate modifications.

In the Golgi, further trimming and addition of sugar residues occur, particularly the removal of mannose and the addition of various sugars such as GlcNAc, galactose (Gal), and sialic acid (NANA). Golgi mannosidase I and mannosidase II remove additional mannose residues from the oligosaccharide, further refining its structure. GlcNAc transferase then adds GlcNAc residues to the growing oligosaccharide chain by transferring GlcNAc from UDP-GlcNAc. In the medial-Golgi, the oligosaccharide undergoes more modifications, including the addition of two GlcNAc units, three Gal residues, and finally three sialic acid (NANA) residues in the trans-Golgi network.

Each compartment of the Golgi plays a distinct role in glycosylation and protein processing. The cis-Golgi network is involved in the phosphorylation of oligosaccharides on lysosomal proteins, a modification that helps target proteins to the lysosomes. The medial-Golgi is the site of important reactions like the trimming of mannose and the addition of GlcNAc, which is essential for the formation of complex glycan structures. In the trans-Golgi, galactose is added to the oligosaccharide, further refining the glycan structure. The trans-Golgi network is responsible for adding sialic acid (NANA) and sorting proteins into vesicles destined for lysosomes or secretion. These specialized modifications and sorting are crucial for protein functionality and their subsequent cellular destinations.

The organization of the Golgi compartments into cisternae—stacks of membrane-bound structures—ensures that enzymes are properly localized to each region, facilitating the sequential and highly regulated modification of oligosaccharides. The Golgi apparatus plays a pivotal role in N-linked glycosylation, a process that begins in the ER and is elaborated within the Golgi. Through the sequential trimming and addition of sugars like GlcNAc, mannose, galactose, and sialic acid, the Golgi ensures that proteins are properly modified for their final functional roles. The distinct regions of the Golgi, from the cis-Golgi to the trans-Golgi network, work in concert to facilitate the precise modification and sorting of glycoproteins, which are essential for a wide range of cellular functions.

== Secretory pathway ==
The secretory pathway is essential for the sorting, packing, and delivery of proteins to their correct cellular destinations. It begins in the rough endoplasmic reticulum (ER), where proteins are synthesized and initially sorted into vesicles for transport. These vesicles then move to the Golgi apparatus, where they undergo further processing and are directed to their final destinations, such as the plasma membrane, endosomes, or lysosomes.

The first step in the secretory pathway is the formation of transport vesicles at the ER. These vesicles are coated with COPII, a protein complex essential for budding from the ER. COPII coats consist of the small GTP-binding protein Sar1 and two additional complexes: Sec23/Sec24 and Sec13/Sec31. These coat proteins interact with membrane cargo proteins, ensuring that the right proteins are packaged into vesicles. The vesicles then move toward the cis-Golgi network, where they enter via COPII-mediated transport.

The secretory pathway also requires retrograde transport to maintain cellular function. Many ER-resident proteins have specific sorting signals that direct them to be retained in the ER or returned from the Golgi if missorted. This is achieved by COPI-coated vesicles, which transport these proteins back to the ER from the Golgi in a process called retrograde trafficking. COPI vesicles also play a key role in the movement of Golgi-resident enzymes between different Golgi compartments, ensuring that each compartment maintains the necessary enzymes for proper modification of cargo proteins.

Once vesicles reach the Golgi, they undergo further modifications, including glycosylation and proteolytic processing. Cargo proteins move through the Golgi compartments (cis, medial, and trans) by either vesicular transport or cisternal maturation. Vesicular transport suggests that the Golgi cisternae remain static while vesicles transport cargo between compartments. In contrast, cisternal maturation poses that the Golgi cisternae themselves mature as enzymes and cargo are progressively moved through the stack, while the cisternae retrogradely exchange enzymes by COPI vesicles.

At the trans-Golgi network, cargo proteins are sorted into different vesicles for delivery to their final destinations. For lysosomal proteins, a crucial modification occurs: the addition of mannose-6-phosphate (M6P) residues in the cis-Golgi. These M6P tags are recognized by M6P receptors in the trans-Golgi membrane, which directs the proteins toward late endosomes. In the endosomes, the M6P receptors dissociate from the cargo, and the receptors are recycled back to the Golgi or plasma membrane. The lysosomal enzymes are then delivered to the lysosomes for their final role in cellular degradation.

Thus, the secretory pathway is a highly coordinated process, involving various vesicular transport mechanisms and modifications, to ensure that proteins are correctly sorted, processed, and delivered to their appropriate cellular locations.
