= Streptomyces echinatus =

Scientific classification
- Domain: Bacteria
- Kingdom: Bacillati
- Phylum: Actinomycetota
- Class: Actinomycetes
- Order: Streptomycetales
- Family: Streptomycetaceae
- Genus: Streptomyces
- Species: S. echinatus

Binomial name
- Streptomyces echinatus Corbaz et al. 1957

Type strain
- AS 4.1642, ATCC 19748, ATCC 21133, BCRC 13656, CBS 409.59, CBS 487.68 T, CBS 684.73, CCRC 13656, CECT 3313, CGMCC 4.1642, CUB 95, DSM 40013, DSM 41251, DSMZ 40013, ETH 8331, HUT-6090, ICMP 159, IFM 1076, IFO 12763, IMET 40461, ISP 5013, JCM 4144, JCM 4574, KCC S-0144, KCC S-0574, KCCS-0144, KCCS-0574, KCTC 9724, LMG 5972, NBRC 12763, NCIB 9598, NCIB 9799, NCIMB 9598, NCIMB 9799, NIJH 180, NRRL 2587, NRRL B-2587, NRRL-ISP 5013, NZRCC 10330, PDDCC 159, PSA 90, RIA 1029, RIA 542, UNIQEM 135, Vernon N40, VKM Ac-762

Species of bacterium

Streptomyces echinatus is a bacterium species from the genus of Streptomyces which was isolated from soil in Angola. Streptomyces echinatus produces echinomycin, dehydrosinefungin A and aranciamycin.

== See also ==
- List of Streptomyces species
