= Miglitol =

Chemical compound

Clinical data
- Trade names: Glyset
- AHFS/Drugs.com: Monograph
- MedlinePlus: a601079
- License data: US FDA: Miglitol
- Pregnancy category: AU: B3
- Routes of administration: By mouth (tablets)
- ATC code: A10BF02 (WHO)

Legal status
- Legal status: US: ℞-only

Pharmacokinetic data
- Bioavailability: Dose-dependent
- Protein binding: Negligible (<4.0%)
- Metabolism: Nil
- Elimination half-life: 2 hours
- Excretion: Renal (95%)

Identifiers
- IUPAC name: (2R,3R,4R,5S)-1-(2-Hydroxyethyl)-2-(hydroxymethyl) piperidine-3,4,5-triol
- CAS Number: 72432-03-2
- PubChem CID: 441314
- IUPHAR/BPS: 4842
- DrugBank: DB00491
- ChemSpider: 390074
- UNII: 0V5436JAQW
- KEGG: D00625
- ChEMBL: ChEMBL1561
- CompTox Dashboard (EPA): DTXSID0023323
- ECHA InfoCard: 100.069.670

Chemical and physical data
- Formula: C_{8}H_{17}NO_{5}
- Molar mass: 207.226 g·mol^{−1}
- 3D model (JSmol): Interactive image
- Density: 1.458 g/cm^{3}
- Melting point: 114 °C (237 °F)
- SMILES: OCCN1[C@@H]([C@@H](O)[C@H](O)[C@@H](O)C1)CO
- InChI: InChI=1S/C8H17NO5/c10-2-1-9-3-6(12)8(14)7(13)5(9)4-11/h5-8,10-14H,1-4H2/t5-,6+,7-,8-/m1/s1; Key:IBAQFPQHRJAVAV-ULAWRXDQSA-N

Miglitol is an oral alpha-glucosidase inhibitor used in the treatment of type 2 diabetes. It works by reversibly inhibiting alpha-glucosidase enzymes in the small intestine, which delays the digestion of complex carbohydrates and subsequently reduces postprandial glucose levels. Approved for clinical use since 1998, miglitol has demonstrated efficacy in improving glycemic control, reducing HbA1c levels, and decreasing both fasting and postprandial plasma glucose concentrations in long-term clinical trials. Additionally, recent studies have suggested that miglitol may have potential as an anti-obesity agent, showing promise in reducing body weight and body mass index in obese or diabetic patients. While generally well-tolerated, the most common side effects associated with miglitol are gastrointestinal disturbances, which are typically mild to moderate and tend to decrease over time.

It must be taken at the start of main meals to have maximal effect

In contrast to acarbose (another alpha-glucosidase inhibitor), miglitol is systemically absorbed; however, it is not metabolized and is excreted by the kidneys.

== Formulation ==
The benefits of alpha-glucosidase inhibitors on health were shown to be stronger when the powder is consumed orally dissolved in water as a beverage in comparison to its intake as ordinary hard gelatin capsules.

== See also ==
- Alpha-glucosidase inhibitor
- Αlpha-Amylase
- Cinnamon
- Miglustat
- Voglibose
