= Prevention of diabetes =

Prevention of diabetes may refer to:

- Prevention of prediabetes
- Prevention of diabetes mellitus type 1
- Prevention of diabetes mellitus type 2
