= Alpha amylase inhibitor =

A_amylase_inhib
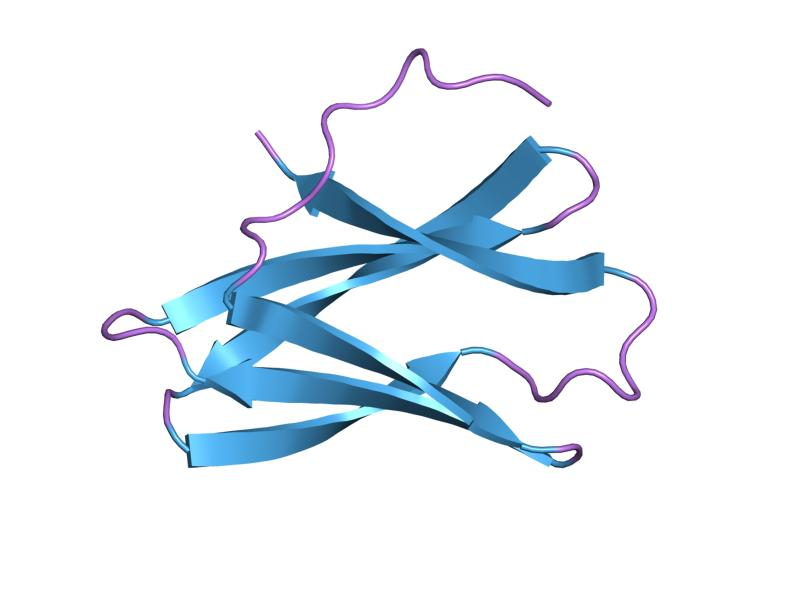
- crystal structure determination, refinement and the molecular model of the alpha-amylase inhibitor hoe-467a

Identifiers
- Symbol: A_amylase_inhib
- Pfam: PF01356
- InterPro: IPR000833
- SCOP2: 1hoe / SCOPe / SUPFAM
Available protein structures:
- PDB: IPR000833 PF01356 (ECOD; PDBsum)
- AlphaFold: IPR000833; PF01356

In molecular biology, alpha-amylase inhibitor (or α-...) is a protein family which inhibits mammalian alpha-amylases specifically, by forming a tight stoichiometric 1:1 complex with alpha-amylase. This family of inhibitors has no action on plant and microbial alpha amylases.

They are found in raw plants/herbs such as cinnamon and bacteria (containing the inhibitor acarbose).

A crystal structure has been determined for tendamistat, the 74-amino acid inhibitor produced by Streptomyces tendae that targets a wide range of mammalian alpha-amylases. The binding of tendamistat to alpha-amylase leads to the steric blockage of the active site of the enzyme. The crystal structure of tendamistat revealed an immunoglobulin-like fold that could potentially adopt multiple conformations. Such molecular flexibility could enable an induced-fit type of binding that would both optimise binding and allow broad target specificity.

== Clinical use ==
The intake of a single dose of alpha-amylase inhibitor before a meal containing complex carbohydrates clearly suppresses the glucose spike and may decrease the postprandial hyperglycemia (higher than 140 mg/dL; >7.8 mmol/L) in patients with type II diabetes. This ability is observed in the native/raw state of the alpha-amylase inhibitor; however, its consumption inside a meal that undergo heating (baking, frying or cooking/boiling) is expected to blunt its property to decrease the activity of carbohydrate digesting enzymes.

== Formulation ==
The benefits of alpha-amylase and alpha-glucosidase inhibitors on health were shown to be stronger when the powder is consumed orally dissolved in water as a beverage in comparison to its intake as ordinary hard gelatin capsules.

== See also ==
- Acarbose
- Alpha-glucosidase inhibitor
- Αlpha-Amylase
- Cinnamon
