= Acarviosin =

Names
- IUPAC name Methyl 4,6-dideoxy-4-{[(1R,4S,5R,6R)-4,5,6-trihydroxy-3-(hydroxymethyl)cyclohex-2-en-1-yl]amino}-α-D-glucopyranoside
- Systematic IUPAC name (1R,2R,3S,6R)-4-(Hydroxymethyl)-6-{[(2R,3S,4S,5R,6S)-6-methoxy-2-methyl-4,5-dihydroxyoxan-3-yl]amino}cyclohex-4-ene-1,2,3-triol

Identifiers
| CAS Number | 80943-41-5 |
| 3D model (JSmol) | Interactive image |
| ChemSpider | 2340579 |
| PubChem CID | 3083346 |
| CompTox Dashboard (EPA) | DTXSID30161850 |
- InChI: InChI=1S/C14H25NO8/c1-5-8(11(19)13(21)14(22-2)23-5)15-7-3-6(4-16)9(17)12(20)10(7)18/h3,5,7-21H,4H2,1-2H3/t5-,7-,8-,9+,10-,11+,12-,13-,14+/m1/s1 Key: KFHKERRGDZTZQJ-HHHVGSORSA-N; InChI=1/C14H25NO8/c1-5-8(11(19)13(21)14(22-2)23-5)15-7-3-6(4-16)9(17)12(20)10(7)18/h3,5,7-21H,4H2,1-2H3/t5-,7-,8-,9+,10-,11+,12-,13-,14+/m1/s1 Key: KFHKERRGDZTZQJ-HHHVGSORBI
- SMILES: O[C@@H]2[C@@H](O)[C@H](N[C@@H]1/C=C(/CO)[C@H](O)[C@@H](O)[C@@H]1O)[C@H](O[C@@H]2OC)C

Properties
| Chemical formula | C_{14}H_{25}NO_{8} |
| Molar mass | 335.353 g·mol^{−1} |
| Density | 1.488 g/mL |
- Except where otherwise noted, data are given for materials in their standard state (at 25 °C [77 °F], 100 kPa). verify (what is ?) Infobox references

Acarviosin is a sugar composed of cyclohexitol linked to a 4-amino-4,6-dideoxy-D-glucopyranose. Acarviosin is part of the potent α-amylase inhibitor acarbose and its derivatives. Acarviosin is a product of the degradation of acarbose by gut microbiota, the glycoside hydrolase from gut bacteria Lactobacillus plantarum is able to hydrolyze acarbose to maltose and acarviosin. The nitrogen atom binds to α-amylase more tightly than the natural substrate making it more potent than other inhibitors. Several other acarviosin-containing α-amylase inhibitors have been found in microbes including isovalertatins and butytatins from Streptomyces luteogriseus and longer oligosaccharides from Streptomyces coelicoflavus.
