= Avenacosidase =

Class of enzymes

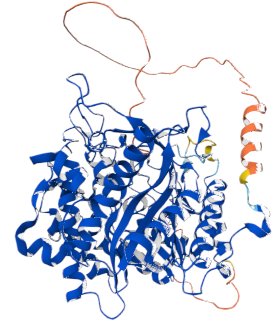
- The enzyme as folded by AlphaFold

Identifiers
- EC no.: 3.2.1.188

Databases
- BRENDA: enzyme data
- ExPASy: NiceZyme view
- KEGG: enzyme entry
- MetaCyc: metabolic pathway
- Rhea: reactions
- PDB structures: RCSB PDB PDBe PDBsum
Search
- PMC: articles
- PubMed: articles
- NCBI: proteins

Avenacosidase is a glucosidase enzyme found in the oat species Avena. Avenacosidase is known to act against fungal infection. Avenacosidase is a member of the family of enzymes that catalyze the hydrolysis of O and S-glycosyl compounds. The enzyme catalyzes the following reaction:

avenacoside B + H2O = 26-desgluco-avenacoside B + D-glucose

The protein consists of 60 kDa (kilodalton) subunits, and was first isolated from oat seedlings. The enzyme is known to halt all catalytic activity once frozen and thawed.
