= Voglibose =

Alpha-glucosidase inhibitor

Clinical data
- AHFS/Drugs.com: International Drug Names
- ATC code: A10BF03 (WHO)

Identifiers
- IUPAC name: (1S,2S,3R,4S,5S)-5-(1,3-dihydroxypropan-2-ylamino)-1-(hydroxymethyl)cyclohexane-1,2,3,4-tetraol
- CAS Number: 83480-29-9
- PubChem CID: 444020
- DrugBank: DB04878
- ChemSpider: 392046
- UNII: S77P977AG8
- KEGG: D01665
- ChEMBL: ChEMBL476960
- CompTox Dashboard (EPA): DTXSID2021442

Chemical and physical data
- Formula: C_{10}H_{21}NO_{7}
- Molar mass: 267.278 g·mol^{−1}
- 3D model (JSmol): Interactive image
- SMILES: OC[C@@]1(O)C[C@H](NC(CO)CO)[C@H](O)[C@@H](O)[C@@H]1O
- InChI: InChI=1S/C10H21NO7/c12-2-5(3-13)11-6-1-10(18,4-14)9(17)8(16)7(6)15/h5-9,11-18H,1-4H2/t6-,7-,8+,9-,10-/m0/s1; Key:FZNCGRZWXLXZSZ-CIQUZCHMSA-N

Voglibose (INN and USAN, trade name Voglib, marketed by Mascot Health Series) is an alpha-glucosidase inhibitor used for lowering postprandial blood glucose levels in people with diabetes mellitus. Voglibose is a research product of Takeda Pharmaceutical Company, Japan's largest pharmaceutical company. Voglibose was discovered in 1981, and was first launched in Japan in 1994, under the trade name BASEN, to improve postprandial hyperglycemia in diabetes mellitus.

Postprandial hyperglycemia (PPHG) is primarily due to first phase insulin secretion. Alpha glucosidase inhibitors delay glucose absorption at the intestine level and thereby prevent sudden surge of glucose after a meal.

There are three major drugs which belong to this class, acarbose, miglitol and voglibose, of which voglibose is the newest.

== Efficacy ==
A Cochrane systematic review assessed the effect of alpha-glucosidase inhibitors (acarbose and voglibose) in people with impaired glucose tolerance, impaired fasting blood glucose, elevated glycated hemoglobin A1c (HbA1c). Trials of people diagnosed with “metabolic syndrome” or such with an intervention duration of less than one year were excluded from this systematic review.

The authors concluded that “[i]n people with intermediate hyperglycaemia the use of alpha‐glucosidase inhibitors [including voglibose] reduces or delays the incidence of type 2 diabetes mellitus”, but “[t]here is no firm evidence that alpha‐glucosidase inhibitors prevent cardiovascular mortality and morbidity.” The results of this review are overall rather uncertain because of “systematic errors in some of the included trials, the overall low number of trials for a particular outcome, imprecise results and missing data of one included trial [“EDIT 1997”, which investigated acarbose, not voglibose].”

The authors investigated in total two studies on voglibose, one which compared it to placebo, one which compared it to diet plus exercise. While the latter one was criticized for imprecision, in the first one, the amount of patients developing diabetes mellitus type 2 was reduced by more than 50% in patients treated with voglibose (5.6%) compared to those treated with placebo (12%). However, this was classified as “low‐certainty evidence”. The two studies where inconclusive for other outcome measures (including all-cause and cardiovascular mortality, non‐fatal myocardial infarction, non‐fatal stroke, congestive heart failure, serious and non‐serious adverse events (increased “non‐serious side effects” where concluded only for acarbose), hypoglycaemia, measures of blood glucose control, blood lipids, body weight, and blood pressure).
