= Α-Glucosidase =

Enzyme

α-Glucosidase
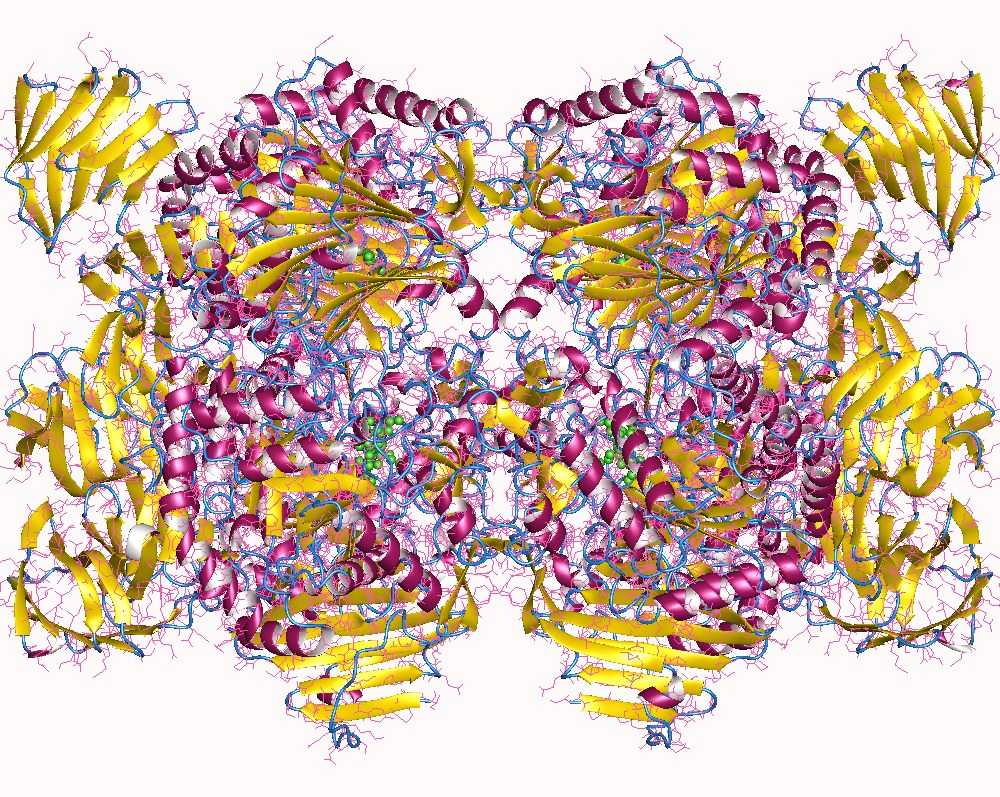
- α-Glucosidase hexamer, Sulfolobus solfataricus

Identifiers
- EC no.: 3.2.1.20
- CAS no.: 9001-42-7

Databases
- BRENDA: enzyme data
- ExPASy: NiceZyme view
- KEGG: enzyme entry
- MetaCyc: metabolic pathway
- Rhea: reactions
- PDB structures: RCSB PDB PDBe PDBsum
Search
- PMC: articles
- PubMed: articles
- NCBI: proteins

Glycogen structure segment.

Maltose

α-Glucosidase (EC 3.2.1.20, (systematic name α-D-glucoside glucohydrolase) is a glucosidase located in the brush border of the small intestine that acts upon α(1→4) bonds:

Hydrolysis of terminal, non-reducing (1→4)-linked α-D-glucose residues with release of D-glucose

This is in contrast to EC 3.2.1.21 β-glucosidase.

== Terminology ==
=== GO:0090599, the broad sense ===
The Gene Ontology entry GO:0090599 represents the broad sense of "alpha-glucosidase". It is defined as "catalysis of the hydrolysis of terminal, non-reducing alpha-linked alpha-D-glucose residue with release of alpha-D-glucose." In this sense, "alpha-glucosidase" can encompass a wide range of enzyme activities, differing by the linkage of their terminal (1→3, 1→4, or 1→6), the specific identity of their substrate (sucrose, maltose, or starch), among other aspects.

=== EC 3.2.1.20, the narrow sense ===
The definition associated with Enzyme Commission number 3.2.1.20 is narrower. It requires the linkage to be 1→4, and the preferred substrate to be smaller oligosaccharides (as opposed to larger polysaccharides like starch: alpha-amylase would otherwise be included). Human genes that produce enzymes with activities specified by this EC number include:

- MGAM is the "maltase-glucoamylase", found on the intestine brush border.
- GAA is the "acid alpha-glucosidase", found in the lysosome.
- GANC, "neutral alpha-glucosidase C".

Synonyms mentioned by the Commission include maltase, glucoinvertase, glucosidosucrase, maltase-glucoamylase, α-glucopyranosidase, glucosidoinvertase, α-D-glucosidase, α-glucoside hydrolase, α-1,4-glucosidase, α-D-glucoside glucohydrolase. These names are not recommended because they may only refer to a specific activity of the enzyme, or a specific protein having this acvitity.

== Mechanism ==
α-Glucosidase hydrolyzes terminal non-reducing (1→4)-linked α-glucose residues to release a single α-glucose molecule. α-Glucosidase is a carbohydrate-hydrolase that releases α-glucose as opposed to β-glucose. β-Glucose residues can be released by glucoamylase, a functionally similar enzyme. The substrate selectivity of α-glucosidase is due to subsite affinities of the enzyme's active site. Two proposed mechanisms include a nucleophilic displacement and an oxocarbenium ion intermediate.

Example of an α-glucosidase catalyzed reaction: maltotriose + water → α-glucose

- Rhodnius prolixus, a blood-sucking insect, forms hemozoin (Hz) during digestion of host hemoglobin. Hemozoin synthesis is dependent on the substrate binding site of α-glucosidase.
- Trout liver α-glucosidases were extracted and characterized. It was shown that for one of the trout liver α-glucosidases maximum activity of the enzyme was increased by 80% during exercise in comparison to a resting trout. This change was shown to correlate to an activity increase for liver glycogen phosphorylase. It is proposed that α-glucosidase in the glucosidic path plays an important part in complementing the phosphorolytic pathway in the liver's metabolic response to energy demands of exercise.
- Yeast and rat small intestinal α-glucosidases have been shown to be inhibited by several groups of flavonoids.

== Structure ==
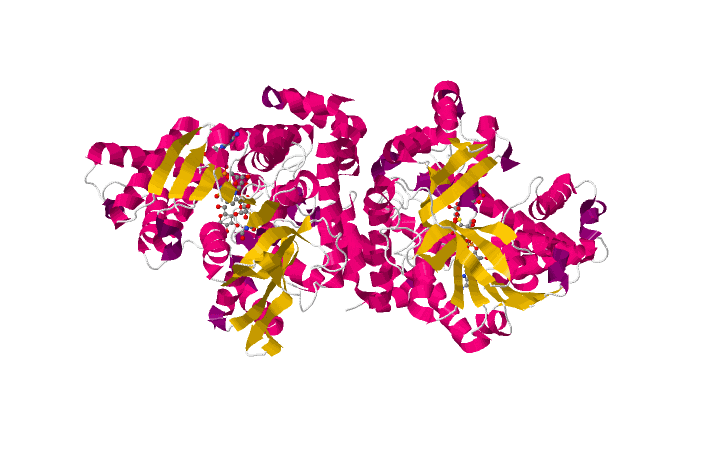
α-glucosidase in complex with maltose and NAD+

α-Glucosidases can be divided, according to primary structure, into two families. The gene coding for human lysosomal α-glucosidase is about 20 kb long and its structure has been cloned and confirmed.

- Human lysosomal α-glucosidase has been studied for the significance of the Asp-518 and other residues in proximity of the enzyme's active site. It was found that substituting Asp-513 with Glu-513 interferes with posttranslational modification and intracellular transport of α-glucosidase's precursor. Additionally, the Trp-516 and Asp-518 residues have been deemed critical for the enzyme's catalytic functionality.
- Kinetic changes in α-glucosidase have been shown to be induced by denaturants such as guanidinium chloride (GdmCl) and SDS solutions. These denaturants cause loss of activity and conformational change. A loss of enzyme activity occurs at much lower concentrations of denaturant than required for conformational changes. This leads to a conclusion that the enzyme's active site conformation is less stable than the whole enzyme conformation in response to the two denaturants.

== Disease relevance ==
- Glycogen storage disease type II, also called Pompe disease: a disorder in which α-glucosidase is deficient. In 2006, the drug alglucosidase alfa became the first released treatment for Pompe disease and acts as an analog to α-glucosidase. Further studies of alglucosidase alfa revealed that iminosugars exhibit inhibition of the enzyme. It was found that one compound molecule binds to a single enzyme molecule. It was shown that 1-deoxynojirimycin (DNJ) would bind the strongest of the sugars tested and blocked the active site of the enzyme almost entirely. The studies enhanced knowledge of the mechanism by which α-glucosidase binds to imino sugars.
- Diabetes: Acarbose, an α-glucosidase inhibitor, competitively and reversibly inhibits α-glucosidase in the intestines. This inhibition lowers the rate of glucose absorption through delayed carbohydrate digestion and extended digestion time. Acarbose may be able to prevent the development of diabetic symptoms. Hence, α-glucosidase inhibitors (like acarbose) are used as anti-diabetic drugs in combination with other anti-diabetic drugs. Luteolin has been found to be a strong inhibitor of α-glucosidase. The compound can inhibit the enzyme up to 36% with a concentration of 0.5 mg/ml. As of 2016, this substance is being tested in rats, mice and cell culture. Flavonoid analogues have been demonstrated with inhibition activity.
- Azoospermia: Diagnosis of azoospermia has potential to be aided by measurement of α-glucosidase activity in seminal plasma. Activity in the seminal plasma corresponds to the functionality of the epididymis.
- Antiviral agents: Many animal viruses possess an outer envelope composed of viral glycoproteins. These are often required for the viral life cycle and utilize cellular machinery for synthesis. Inhibitors of α-glucosidase show that the enzyme is involved in the pathway for N-glycans for viruses such as HIV and human hepatitis B virus (HBV). Inhibition of α-glucosidase can prevent fusion of HIV and secretion of HBV.

== See also ==
- Alglucosidase alfa

Some other glucosidases:

- Cellulase
- Beta-glucosidase
- Glycogen debranching enzyme
