= Alpha-glucosidase inhibitor =

Oral anti-diabetic drugs

Alpha-glucosidase inhibitors (AGIs) are oral anti-diabetic drugs used for diabetes mellitus type 2 that work by preventing the digestion of carbohydrates (such as starch and table sugar). Naturally occurring AGIs are found in raw plants/herbs such as cinnamon and white mulberry as well as some bacteria. Carbohydrates are normally converted into simple sugars (monosaccharides) by alpha-glucosidase enzymes present on cells lining the intestine, enabling monosaccharides to be absorbed through the intestine. Hence, alpha-glucosidase inhibitors reduce the impact of dietary carbohydrates on blood sugar.

== Examples and differences ==
Examples of alpha-glucosidase inhibitors include:

- Acarbose – Precose or Glucobay
- Miglitol – Glyset
- Voglibose

Even though the drugs have a similar mechanism of action, there are subtle differences between acarbose and miglitol. Acarbose is an oligosaccharide, whereas miglitol resembles a monosaccharide. Miglitol is fairly well absorbed into the bloodstream, as opposed to acarbose. Moreover, acarbose inhibits pancreatic alpha-amylase in addition to alpha-glucosidase, and is degraded by gut bacterial maltogenic alpha-amylase and cyclomaltodextrinase.

== Natural alpha glucosidase inhibitors ==
There are a large number of natural products with alpha-glucosidase inhibitor action. In fact, the prototypic drug of this class (acarbose) is discovered from soil bacteria.

For example, research has shown the culinary mushroom Maitake (Grifola frondosa) has a hypoglycemic effect. The reason Maitake lowers blood sugar is because the mushroom naturally contains an alpha glucosidase inhibitor.

All cinnamon species show acarbose-like activity. A single dose of raw cinnamon before a meal containing complex carbohydrates decreases the postprandial hyperglycemia (higher than 140 mg/dL; >7.8 mmol/L) in patients with type II diabetes. Another plant attracting a lot of attention is Salacia oblonga.

== Clinical use ==
Alpha-glucosidase inhibitors are used to establish greater glycemic control over hyperglycemia in diabetes mellitus type 2, particularly with regard to postprandial hyperglycemia. The intake of a single dose before a meal containing complex carbohydrates clearly suppresses the glucose spike and may decrease the postprandial hyperglycemia (higher than 140 mg/dL; >7.8 mmol/L) in patients with type II diabetes. This ability is observed in the native/raw state of the alpha-amylase inhibitor; therefore, its consumption inside a meal that undergo heating (baking, frying or cooking/boiling) is expected to blunt its property to decrease the activity of carbohydrate digesting enzymes. They may be used as monotherapy in conjunction with an appropriate diabetic diet and exercise, or they may be used in conjunction with other anti-diabetic drugs.

A Cochrane systematic review assessed the effect of AGIs in people with impaired glucose tolerance, impaired fasting blood glucose, elevated glycated hemoglobin A1c (HbA1c). It was found that Acarbose appeared to reduce incidence of diabetes mellitus type 2 when compared to placebo, however there was no conclusive evidence that acarbose compare to diet and exercise, metformin, placebo, no intervention improved all-cause mortality, reduced or increased risk of cardiovascular mortality, serious or non-serious adverse events, non-fatal stroke, congestive heart failure, or non-fatal myocardial infarction. The same review found that there was no conclusive evidence that voglibose compared to diet and exercise or placebo reduced incidence of diabetes mellitus type 2, or any of the other measured outcomes.

In patients with diabetes mellitus type 1, alpha-glucosidase inhibitors use has not been officially approved by the Food and Drug Administration in the US but some data exists on the effectiveness in this population, showing potential benefits weighted against an increased risk of hypoglycemia.

== Mechanism of action ==
Alpha-glucosidase inhibitors are saccharides that act as competitive inhibitors of enzymes needed to digest carbohydrates: specifically alpha-glucosidase enzymes in the brush border of the small intestines. The membrane-bound intestinal alpha-glucosidases hydrolyze oligosaccharides, trisaccharides, and disaccharides to glucose and other monosaccharides in the small intestine.

Acarbose also blocks pancreatic alpha-amylase in addition to inhibiting membrane-bound alpha-glucosidases. Pancreatic alpha-amylase hydrolyzes complex starches to oligosaccharides in the lumen of the small intestine.

Inhibition of these enzyme systems reduces the rate of digestion of carbohydrates. Less glucose is absorbed because the carbohydrates are not broken down into glucose molecules. In diabetic patients, the short-term effect of these drugs therapies is to decrease current blood glucose levels: the long-term effect is a small reduction in hemoglobin _{A1c} level.

== Dosing ==
Since alpha-glucosidase inhibitors are competitive inhibitors of digestive enzymes, they must be taken at the start of main meals to have maximal effect. Their effects on blood sugar levels following meals will depend on the amount of complex carbohydrates in the meal.

=== Formulation ===
The health benefits of a alpha-glucosidase-inhibiting herb powder were shown to be stronger when the powder is consumed orally dissolved in water as a beverage in comparison to its intake as ordinary hard gelatin capsules.

The package insert of acarbose tablet lists two ways to take it: chewing it down with the first bites of food, or swallowing it some time before eating. With the same brand of acarbose tablet, chewing food appears effective than swallowing in combating the blood sugar rise from drinking sucrose water.

== Side effects and precautions ==
Since alpha-glucosidase inhibitors prevent the degradation of complex carbohydrates into glucose, the carbohydrates will remain in the intestine. In the colon, bacteria will digest the complex carbohydrates, thereby causing gastrointestinal side effects such as flatulence and diarrhea. Since these effects are dose-related, it is generally advised to start with a low dose and gradually increase the dose to the desired amount. Pneumatosis intestinalis is another reported side effect.

If a patient using an alpha-glucosidase inhibitor suffers from an episode of hypoglycemia, the patient should eat something containing monosaccharides such as glucose tablets or a soft drink containing HFCS. Since the drug will prevent the digestion of polysaccharides (or non-monosaccharides), non-monosaccharide foods may not effectively reverse a hypoglycemic episode in a patient taking an alpha-glucosidase inhibitor.

== See also ==
- Acarbose
- Alpha-glucosidase
- Alpha amylase inhibitor
- Cinnamon
