= Streptomyces tendae =

Scientific classification
- Domain: Bacteria
- Kingdom: Bacillati
- Phylum: Actinomycetota
- Class: Actinomycetes
- Order: Streptomycetales
- Family: Streptomycetaceae
- Genus: Streptomyces
- Species: S. tendae

Binomial name
- Streptomyces tendae Ettlinger et al. 1958

Type strain
- AS 4.1460, ATCC 19812, BCRC 12167, CBS 431.59, CBS 565.68, CCRC 12167, CGMCC 4.1460, DSM 40101, ETH 11313, ICMP 132, IFM 1176, IFO 12822, IMET 40459, IPV 1833, ISP 5101, JCM 4149, JCM 4610, KCC S-0149, KCC S-0610, KCCS- 0610, KCCS-0149, KCTC 19061, Lanoot R-8675, LMG 19314, LMG 5987, NBRC 12822, NCIB 9614, NCIMB 9614, NIHJ 179, NRRL B-2313, NRRL-ISP 5101, NZRCC 10343, PDDCC 132, PSA 92, R-8675, RIA 1092, RIA 534, RIA 594, UNIQEM 199, Vernon N50, VKM Ac-1889

Species of bacterium

Streptomyces tendae is a bacterium species from the genus of Streptomyces which has been isolated from soil in France. Streptomyces tendae produces carbomycin, streptofactin, geosmin, cervimycin A-D and nikkomycins. Also said to be the source of Tendamistat (HOE 467), an alpha amylase inhibitor.

== See also ==
- List of Streptomyces species
