= Echinomycin =

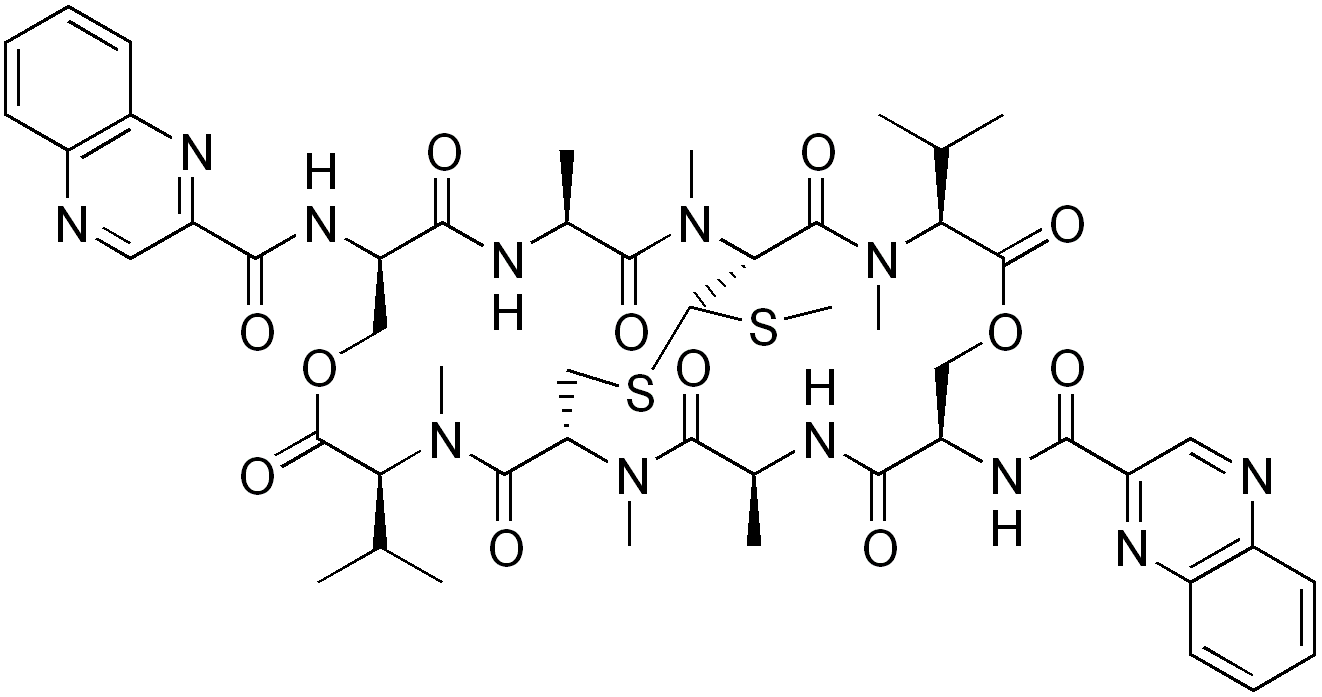

Names
- Other names Quinomycin A; Levomycin

Identifiers
CAS Number	512-64-1
3D model (JSmol)	Interactive image
ChemSpider	5257063
ECHA InfoCard	100.164.832
PubChem CID	6857732
UNII	TG824J6RQT
CompTox Dashboard (EPA)	DTXSID5031266
- InChI: InChI=1S/C51H64N12O12S2/c1-25(2)38-49(72)74-22-36(59-42(65)34-21-53-30-17-13-15-19-32(30)57-34)44(67)55-28(6)46(69)63(10)40-48(71)62(9)39(26(3)4)50(73)75-23-35(58-41(64)33-20-52-29-16-12-14-18-31(29)56-33)43(66)54-27(5)45(68)60(7)37(47(70)61(38)8)24-77-51(40)76-11/h12-21,25-28,35-40,51H,22-24H2,1-11H3,(H,54,66)(H,55,67)(H,58,64)(H,59,65)/t27-,28-,35+,36+,37-,38-,39-,40+,51?/m0/s1 Key: AUJXLBOHYWTPFV-VITLIGDRSA-N; InChI=1/C51H64N12O12S2/c1-25(2)38-49(72)74-22-36(59-42(65)34-21-53-30-17-13-15-19-32(30)57-34)44(67)55-28(6)46(69)63(10)40-48(71)62(9)39(26(3)4)50(73)75-23-35(58-41(64)33-20-52-29-16-12-14-18-31(29)56-33)43(66)54-27(5)45(68)60(7)37(47(70)61(38)8)24-77-51(40)76-11/h12-21,25-28,35-40,51H,22-24H2,1-11H3,(H,54,66)(H,55,67)(H,58,64)(H,59,65)/t27-,28-,35+,36+,37-,38-,39-,40+,51?/m0/s1 Key: AUJXLBOHYWTPFV-VITLIGDRBO
- SMILES: C[C@H]1C(=O)N([C@H]2CSC([C@@H](C(=O)N([C@H](C(=O)OC[C@H](C(=O)N1)NC(=O)c3cnc4ccccc4n3)C(C)C)C)N(C(=O)[C@@H](NC(=O)[C@@H](COC(=O)[C@@H](N(C2=O)C)C(C)C)NC(=O)c5cnc6ccccc6n5)C)C)SC)C

Properties
Chemical formula	C_{51}H_{64}N_{12}O_{12}S_{2}
Molar mass	1101.26 g/mol
- Except where otherwise noted, data are given for materials in their standard state (at 25 °C [77 °F], 100 kPa). verify (what is ?) Infobox references

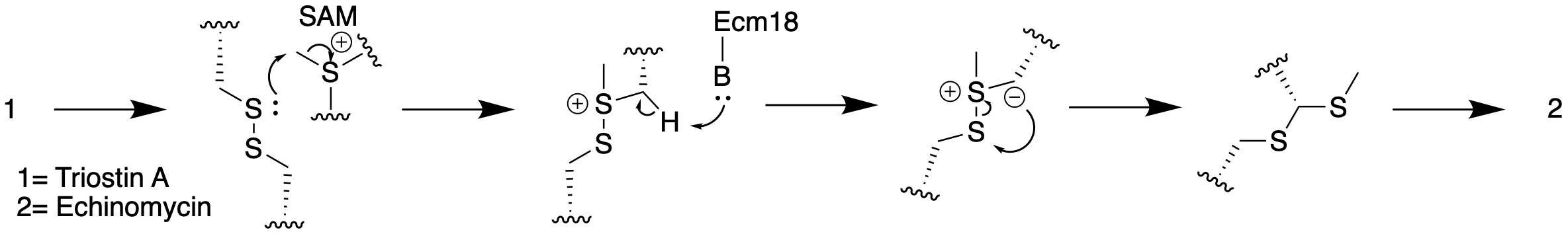
Proposed enzymatic reaction mechanism for the biotransformation of 1 to 2.

Echinomycin is a peptide antibiotic. It is a dimer of two peptides creating a cyclic structure. It contains a bicyclic aromatic chromophore that is attached to the dimerized cyclic peptide core and a thioacetal bridge. It intercalates into DNA at two specific sites, thereby blocking the binding of hypoxia inducible factor 1 alpha (HIF1alpha).

== Biosynthesis ==
Echinomycin is a bis-intercalator peptide and is biosynthesized by a unique nonribosomal peptide synthetase (NRPS). Echinomycin is isolated from various bacteria such as Streptomyces lasalienis. It belongs to a family of quinoxaline antibiotics. There is great interest in this group of compounds because they have very potent antibacterial, anticancer, and antiviral activities.

The biosynthesis of echinomycin starts with molecule QC. L-tryptophan is the precursor for QC and its biosynthesis parallels the first stage of nikkomycin biosynthesis.

After QC is biosynthesized, the adenylation domain-containing Ecm1 activates and transfers QC to FabC using the fatty acid biosynthesis acyl carrier protein (ACP). The first module, Ecm6 accepts the QC-SFabC as the starter unit. Emc7 contains a terminal thioesterase domain which allows the peptide to dimerize and then release. This cyclized product then goes on to Ecm17, an oxidoreductase, creating a disulfide bond. The last step in this biosynthesis transforms the disulfide bond into a thioacetal bridge. This transformation takes place within Ecm18, a S-adenosyl-L-methionine (SAM)-dependent methyltransferase. The mechanism is proposed to proceed through two steps. Initially Emc18 transfers the activated methyl group from SAM to one of the sulfur atoms in the disulfide bond. Secondly deprotonation of the alpha proton to the tertiary sulfonium cation promotes the rearrangement for the formation of the thioacetal bond.

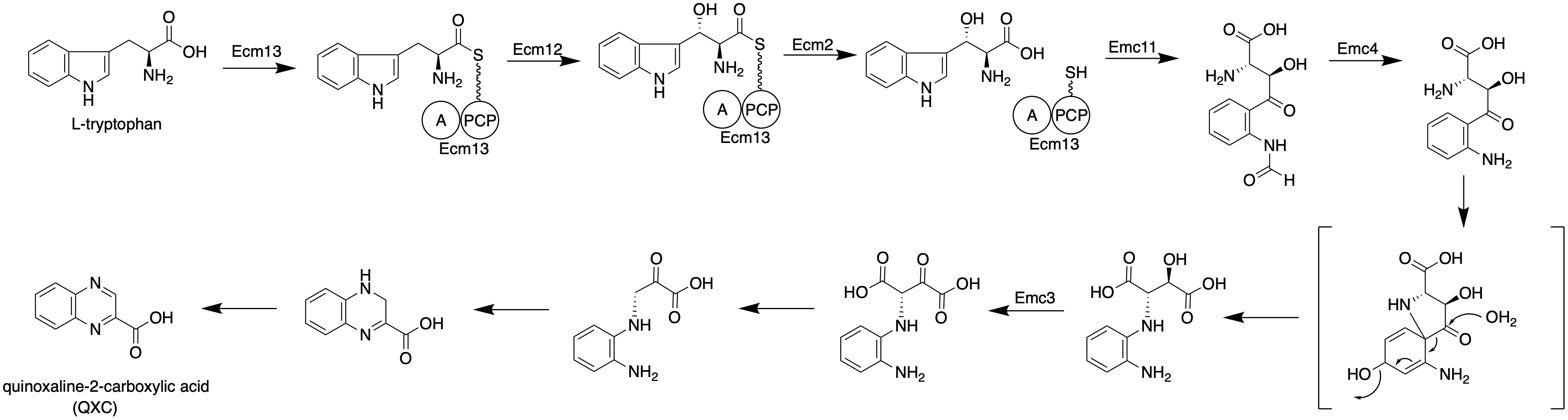
Proposed biosyntheis of the chormophore in echinomycin and other quinomycin-type antibiotics.

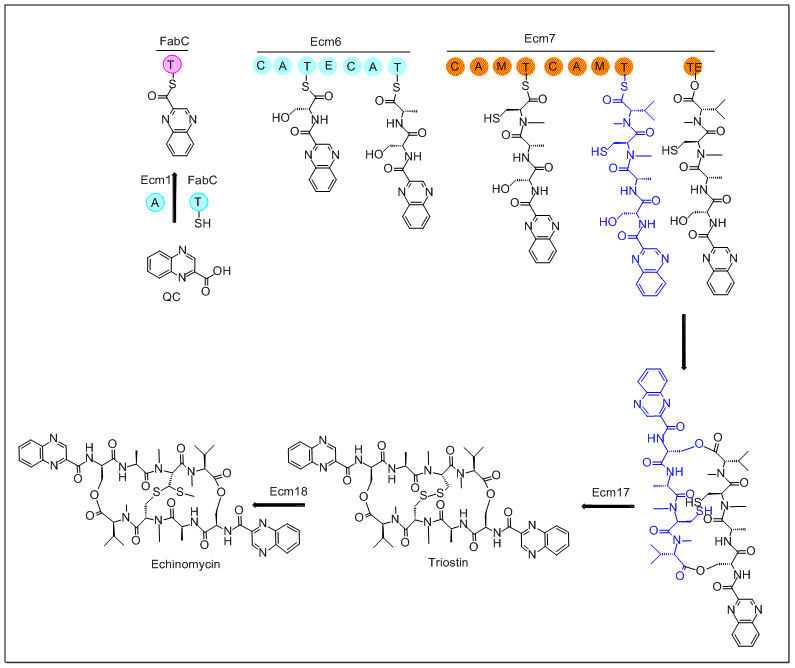
