= Streptomyces coelicoflavus =

Scientific classification
- Domain: Bacteria
- Kingdom: Bacillati
- Phylum: Actinomycetota
- Class: Actinomycetia
- Order: Streptomycetales
- Family: Streptomycetaceae
- Genus: Streptomyces
- Species: S. coelicoflavus

Binomial name
- Streptomyces coelicoflavus (ex Ryabova and Preobrazhenskaya 1957) Terekhova 1986

Type strain
- AS 4.1596, BCRC 16856, CCRC 16856, CGMCC 4.1596, DSM 41471, IFO 15399, INA 9630, JCM 6918, NBRC 15399, NRRL B-16363, VKM Ac-1221

Synonyms
- "Actinomyces coelicoflavus" Ryabova and Preobrazhenskaya 1957

Species of bacterium

Streptomyces coelicoflavus is a bacterium species from the genus of Streptomyces. Streptomyces coelicoflavus produces acarviosin-containing oligosaccharides.

== See also ==
- List of Streptomyces species
