= Nikkomycin =

Group of antifungal medications

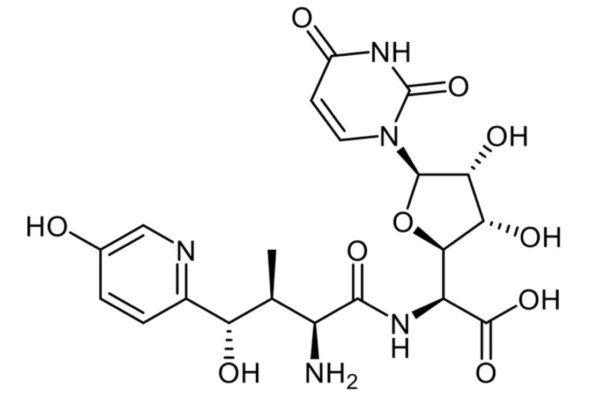
Structure of nikkomycin Z

Nikkomycins are a group of antifungal medications. They work by interfering with the building of the fungal cell wall which results in the fungal cell breaking open. They were discovered in 1976. The nikkomycins were discovered to be highly active against the dimorphic fungi Coccidioides immitis, Blastomyces dermatitidis, and Histoplasma capsulatum, with nikkomycin Z more active than nikkomycin X both in vitro and in vivo in mouse models. Nikkomycin Z was also found to interact synergistically with multiple azole antifungals against Candida albicans, both in vitro and in vivo in mouse models. The specific agent nikkomycin Z has weak activity against Aspergillus fumigatus which may be of benefit when used with other medications, such as caspofungin, ranconazole and amphotericin B, fluconazole or itraconazole. Nikkomycin Z also inhibits growth of Batrachochytrium dendrobatidis, a serious fungal pathogen linked to global amphibian declines, while lower concentrations of Nikkomycin Z enhanced natural amphibian antimicrobial skin peptide effectiveness in vitro. The safety and pharmacokinetics of single doses of nikkomycin Z was evaluated in a Phase I study in humans.

Originally identified from Streptomyces tendae, the nikkomycins are chitin synthase inhibitors.
