= Mannosyl-oligosaccharide glucosidase =

Class of enzymes

Identifiers
- EC no.: 3.2.1.106
- CAS no.: 78413-07-7

Databases
- BRENDA: enzyme data
- ExPASy: NiceZyme view
- KEGG: enzyme entry
- MetaCyc: metabolic pathway
- Rhea: reactions
- PDB structures: RCSB PDB PDBe PDBsum
Search
- PMC: articles
- PubMed: articles
- NCBI: proteins

MOGS

Identifiers
- Aliases: MOGS, CDG2B, CWH41, DER7, GCS1, mannosyl-oligosaccharide glucosidase
- External IDs: OMIM: 601336; MGI: 1929872; GeneCards: MOGS
Enzyme activity
| EC # | BRENDA | ExPASy | KEGG | MetaCyc |
|---|---|---|---|---|
| 3.2.1.106 | ↗ | ↗ | ↗ | ↗ |

Gene location (Mouse)
| Chr. | Chromosome 6 (mouse) |
| Band | 6|6 C3 | Start | 83,092,477 bp |
| Band | 6|6 C3 | End | 83,095,879 bp |
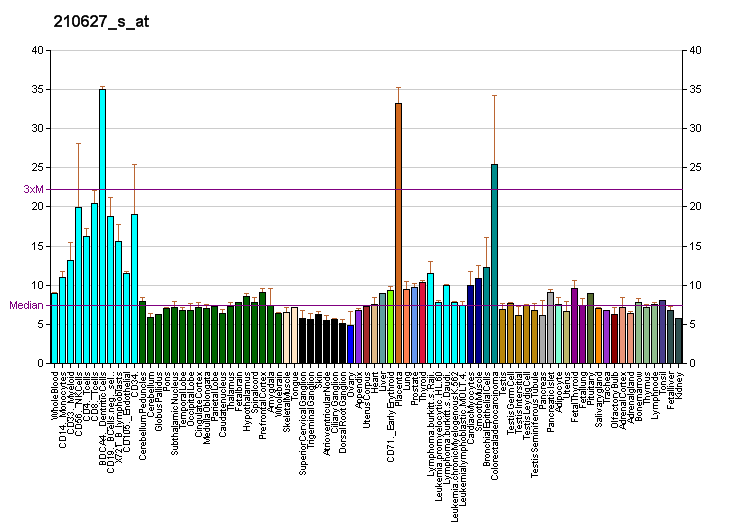
RNA expression pattern
| Bgee | Human / Mouse (ortholog); Top expressed in: body of pancreas; body of stomach; stromal cell of endometrium; right uterine tube; right lobe of thyroid gland; minor salivary glands; right lobe of liver; left lobe of thyroid gland; anterior pituitary; upper lobe of left lung / Top expressed in: primitive streak; Paneth cell; condyle; cumulus cell; somite; fossa; fetal liver hematopoietic progenitor cell; lacrimal gland; epiblast; abdominal wall; More reference expression data |
| BioGPS | More reference expression data |
Gene ontology
| Molecular function | glucosidase activity; catalytic activity; hydrolase activity; hydrolase activity, acting on glycosyl bonds; Glc3Man9GlcNAc2 oligosaccharide glucosidase activity |
| Cellular component | integral component of membrane; extracellular exosome; membrane; endoplasmic reticulum; endoplasmic reticulum membrane |
| Biological process | metabolism; protein N-linked glycosylation; protein folding; oligosaccharide metabolic process |
Sources:Amigo / QuickGO
Orthologs
| Databases | NCBI: entry |
| Species | Human | Mouse |
| Entrez | 7841 | 57377 |
| Ensembl | n/a | ENSMUSG00000030036 |
| UniProt | Q13724 | Q80UM7 |
| RefSeq (mRNA) | NM_006302; NM_001146158 | NM_020619 |
| RefSeq (protein) | NP_001139630; NP_006293 | NP_065644 |
| Location (UCSC) | n/a | Chr 6: 83.09 – 83.1 Mb |
| PubMed search |
- Wikidata
| View/Edit Human | View/Edit Mouse |

Mannosyl-oligosaccharide glucosidase (MOGS) (EC 3.2.1.106) is an enzyme that in humans is encoded by the MOGS gene. The systematic name is mannosyl-oligosaccharide glucohydrolase. MOGS is a transmembrane protein found in the membrane of the endoplasmic reticulum of eukaryotic cells. Biologically, it functions within the N-glycosylation pathway.

== Enzyme mechanism ==
MOGS is a glycoside hydrolase enzyme, belonging to Family 63 as classified within the Carbohydrate-Active Enzyme database.

It catalyses exohydrolysis of the non-reducing terminal glucose residue in the mannosyl-oligosaccharide glycan Glc_{3}Man_{9}GlcNAc_{2}.

This reaction is the first trimming step in the N-glycosylation pathway. Prior to this, the glycan was co-translationally attached to a nascent protein by the oligosaccharyltransferase complex. MOGS removes the terminal glucose residue, leaving the glycoprotein linked to Glc_{2}Man_{9}GlcNAc_{2}, which can then serve as a substrate for glucosidase II.

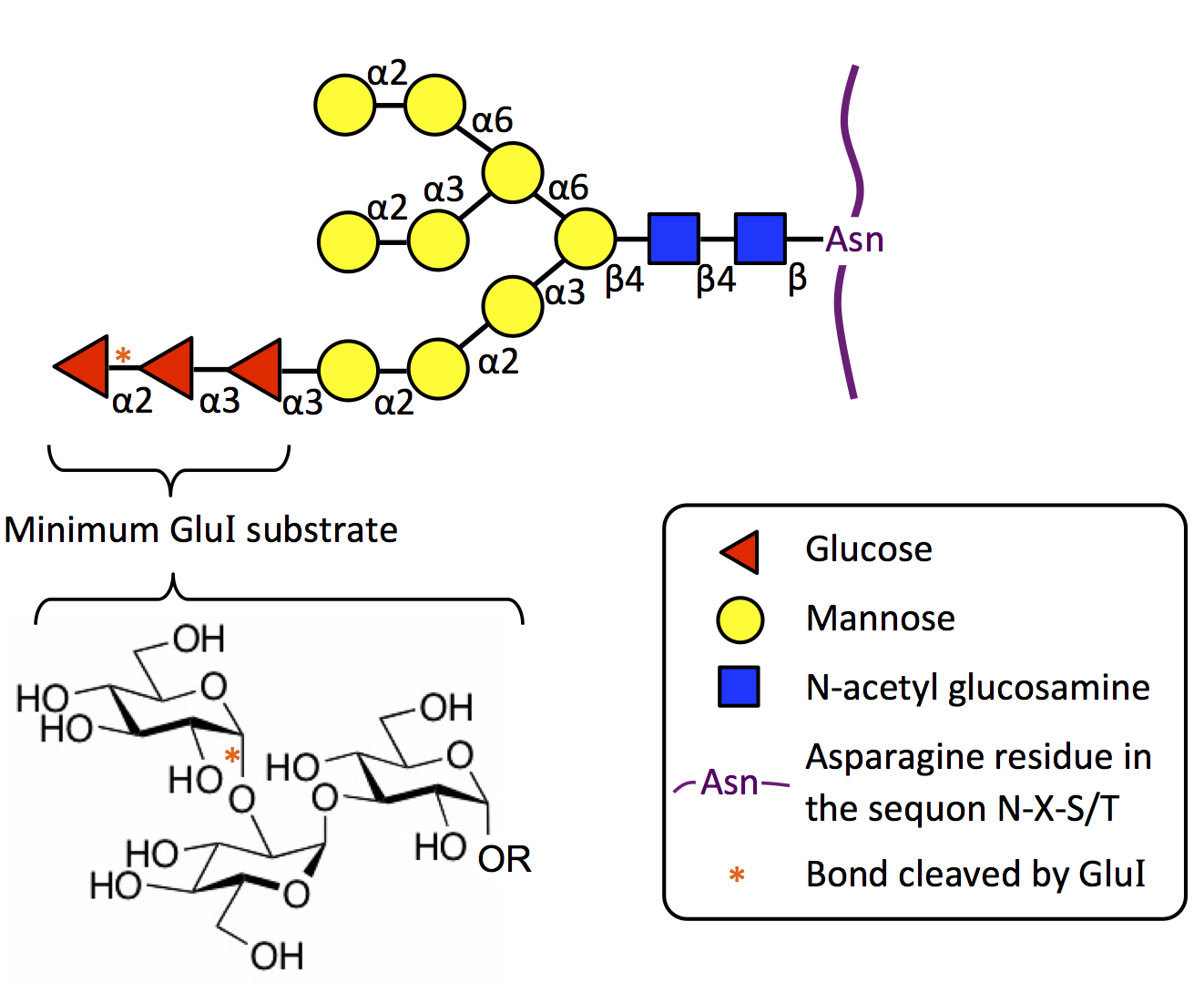
The oligosaccharide substrate for MOGS

== Substrate specificity ==
MOGS is highly specific to the oligosaccharide in its biological substrate in the N-glycosylation pathway. Eukaryotic MOGS does not cleave simple substrates such as p-nitrophenyl glucose, and it also shows no activity to the α(1→3) linkage present at the terminus of Glc_{1-2}Man_{9}GlcNAc_{2}. Furthermore, the minimum substrate is the glucotriose molecule (Glc-α(1→2)-Glc-α(1→3)-Glc), linked as in its native Glc_{3}Man_{9}GlcNAc_{2} substrate. Kojibiose, the disaccharide Glc-α(1→2)-Glc, acts as a weak inhibitor on plant, animal, and yeast MOGS.

MOGS also acts to lesser extent on the corresponding glycolipids and glycopeptides.

== Other names ==
This enzyme has also been called processing α-glucosidase I, Glc_{3}Man_{9}NAc_{2} oligosaccharide glucosidase, and trimming glucosidase I, GCS1.
