= Streptomyces luteogriseus =

Scientific classification
- Domain: Bacteria
- Kingdom: Bacillati
- Phylum: Actinomycetota
- Class: Actinomycetes
- Order: Streptomycetales
- Family: Streptomycetaceae
- Genus: Streptomyces
- Species: S. luteogriseus

Binomial name
- Streptomyces luteogriseus Schmitz et al. 1964 (Approved Lists 1980)

Type strain
- ATCC 15072, BCC 5870, BCRC 16210, C-4657, CBS 703.72, CCRC 16210, CGMCC 4.2001, DSM 40483, IFM 1203, IFO 13402, ISP 5483, JCM 4786, NBRC 13402, NRRL B-12422, NRRL-ISP 5483, RIA 1363, VKM Ac-1913

Species of bacterium

Streptomyces luteogriseus is a bacterium species from the genus of Streptomyces. Streptomyces luteogriseus produces peliomycin and (+)-(S)-streptonol A.

== See also ==
- List of Streptomyces species
