= Glucan 1,4-alpha-maltohydrolase =

Identifiers
- EC no.: 3.2.1.133
- CAS no.: 160611-47-2

Databases
- IntEnz: IntEnz view
- BRENDA: BRENDA entry
- ExPASy: NiceZyme view
- KEGG: KEGG entry
- MetaCyc: metabolic pathway
- PRIAM: profile
- PDB structures: RCSB PDB PDBe PDBsum
Search
- PMC: articles
- PubMed: articles
- NCBI: proteins

Glucan 1,4-alpha-maltohydrolase (EC 3.2.1.133, maltogenic alpha-amylase, 1,4-alpha-D-glucan alpha-maltohydrolase) is an enzyme with systematic name 4-alpha-D-glucan alpha-maltohydrolase. This enzyme catalyses the following chemical reaction

hydrolysis of (1->4)-alpha-D-glucosidic linkages in polysaccharides so as to remove successive alpha-maltose residues from the non-reducing ends of the chains

This enzyme acts on starch and related polysaccharides and oligosaccharides. Maltogenic amylases from Bacillus stearothermophilus, Thermus sp. and Geobacillus thermoleovorans are able to degrade acarbose to glucose and acarviosine-glucose.

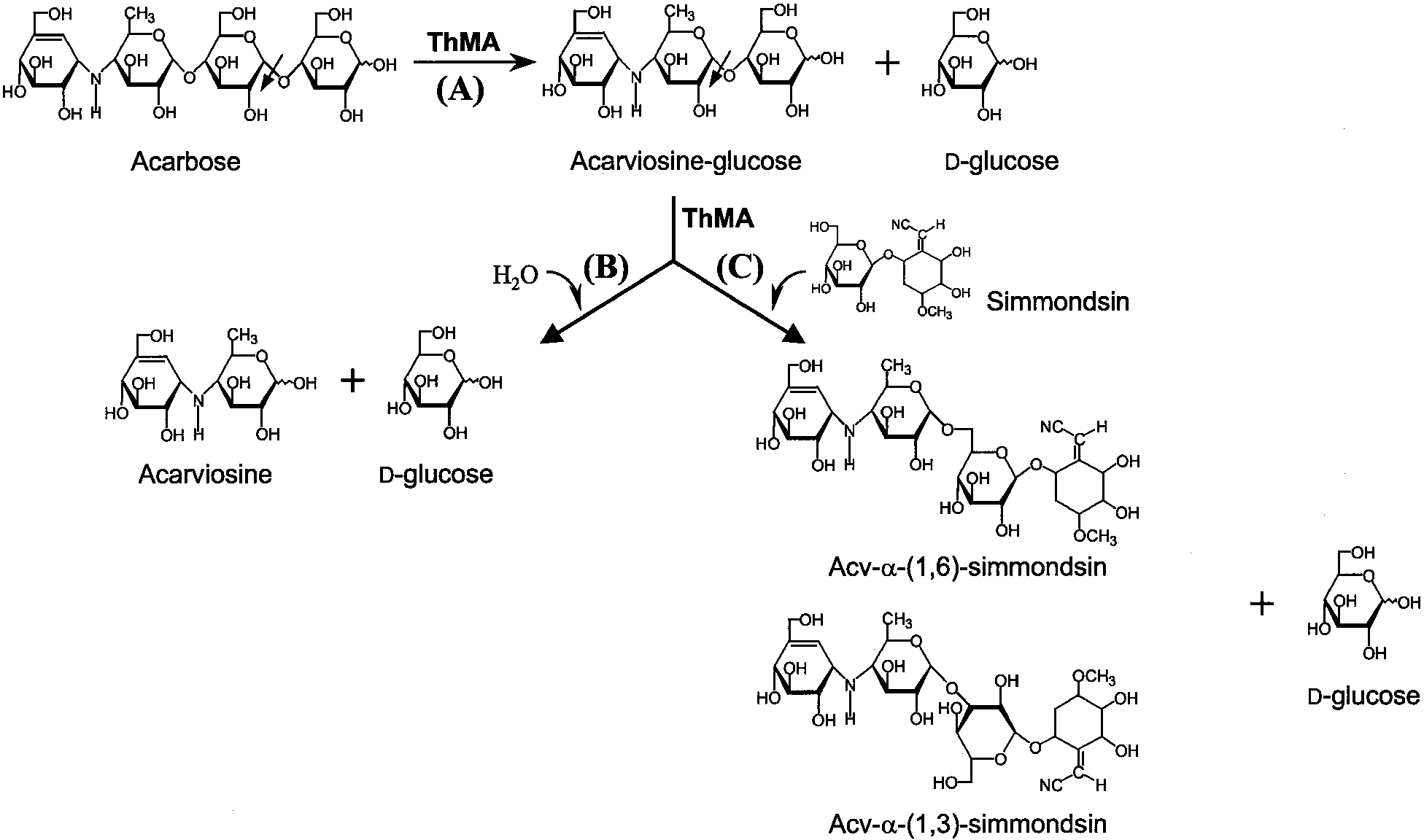
Acarbose is degraded by different enzymes in the gut microbiome. secretion of gut bacterial enzymes inhibit acarbose.
