= Cyclomaltodextrinase =

Identifiers
- EC no.: 3.2.1.54
- CAS no.: 37288-41-8

Databases
- IntEnz: IntEnz view
- BRENDA: BRENDA entry
- ExPASy: NiceZyme view
- KEGG: KEGG entry
- MetaCyc: metabolic pathway
- PRIAM: profile
- PDB structures: RCSB PDB PDBe PDBsum
- Gene Ontology: AmiGO / QuickGO
Search
- PMC: articles
- PubMed: articles
- NCBI: proteins

The enzyme cyclomaltodextrinase (EC 3.2.1.54) catalyzes the chemical reaction

cyclomaltodextrin + H_{2}O $\rightleftharpoons$ linear maltodextrin

It belongs to the family of hydrolases, specifically those glycosidases that hydrolyse O- and S-glycosyl compounds. The systematic name of this enzyme class is cyclomaltodextrin dextrin-hydrolase (decyclizing). Other names in common use include cycloheptaglucanase, cyclohexaglucanase, and cyclodextrinase. The enzyme participates in starch and sucrose metabolism and acarbose degradation. The cyclomaltodextrinase is capable of degradation of acarbose to glucose and acarviosine-glucose.

== Structural studies ==
As of late 2007, two structures have been solved for this class of enzymes, with PDB accession codes 1EA9 and 1H3G.
