= GANC =

Protein-coding gene in the species Homo sapiens

Identifiers
- Aliases: GANC, glucosidase alpha, neutral C
- External IDs: OMIM: 104180; MGI: 1923301; GeneCards: GANC
Enzyme activity
EC #	BRENDA	ExPASy	KEGG	MetaCyc
3.2.1.20	↗	↗	↗	↗

Gene location (Human)
Chr.	Chromosome 15 (human)
Band	15q15.1	Start	42,273,233 bp
Band	15q15.1	End	42,356,935 bp

Gene location (Mouse)
Chr.	Chromosome 2 (mouse)
Band	2|2 E5	Start	120,234,377 bp
Band	2|2 E5	End	120,292,181 bp
RNA expression pattern
Bgee	Human / Mouse (ortholog); Top expressed in: sural nerve; monocyte; right lung; bone marrow cell; Achilles tendon; rectum; upper lobe of left lung; right coronary artery; Descending thoracic aorta; muscle of thigh / Top expressed in: zygote; muscle of thigh; spermatocyte; secondary oocyte; right kidney; neural layer of retina; granulocyte; genital tubercle; spermatid; brown adipose tissue; More reference expression data
BioGPS	n/a
Orthologs
Databases	NCBI: entry; OMA: entry
Species	Human	Mouse
Entrez	2595	76051
Ensembl	ENSG00000214013	ENSMUSG00000062646
UniProt	Q8TET4	Q8BVW0
RefSeq (mRNA)	NM_198141; NM_001301409; NM_001301410	NM_172672
RefSeq (protein)	NP_001288338; NP_001288339; NP_937784	NP_766260
Location (UCSC)	Chr 15: 42.27 – 42.36 Mb	Chr 2: 120.23 – 120.29 Mb
PubMed search
- Wikidata
View/Edit Human	View/Edit Mouse

Neutral alpha-glucosidase C is an enzyme that in humans is encoded by the GANC gene.

== Function ==
Glycoside hydrolase enzymes hydrolyse the glycosidic bond between two or more carbohydrates, or between a carbohydrate and a non-carbohydrate moiety. This gene encodes a member of glycosyl hydrolases family 31. This enzyme hydrolyses terminal, non-reducing 1,4-linked alpha-D-glucose residues and releases alpha-D-glucose. This is a key enzyme in glycogen metabolism and its gene localizes to a chromosomal region (15q15) that is associated with susceptibility to diabetes.
