= Glucan 1,3-α-glucosidase =

Identifiers
- EC no.: 3.2.1.84
- CAS no.: 9073-99-8

Databases
- IntEnz: IntEnz view
- BRENDA: BRENDA entry
- ExPASy: NiceZyme view
- KEGG: KEGG entry
- MetaCyc: metabolic pathway
- PRIAM: profile
- PDB structures: RCSB PDB PDBe PDBsum
Search
- PMC: articles
- PubMed: articles
- NCBI: proteins

Glucan 1,3-α-glucosidase (EC 3.2.1.84, exo-1,3-α-glucanase, glucosidase II, 1,3-α-D-glucan 3-glucohydrolase) is an enzyme with systematic name 3-α-D-glucan 3-glucohydrolase. It catalyses the hydrolysis of terminal (1→3)-α-D-glucosidic links in (1→3)-α-D-glucans.

It does not act on nigeran although it has some activity against nigerose.
