= Acarbose =

Chemical compound

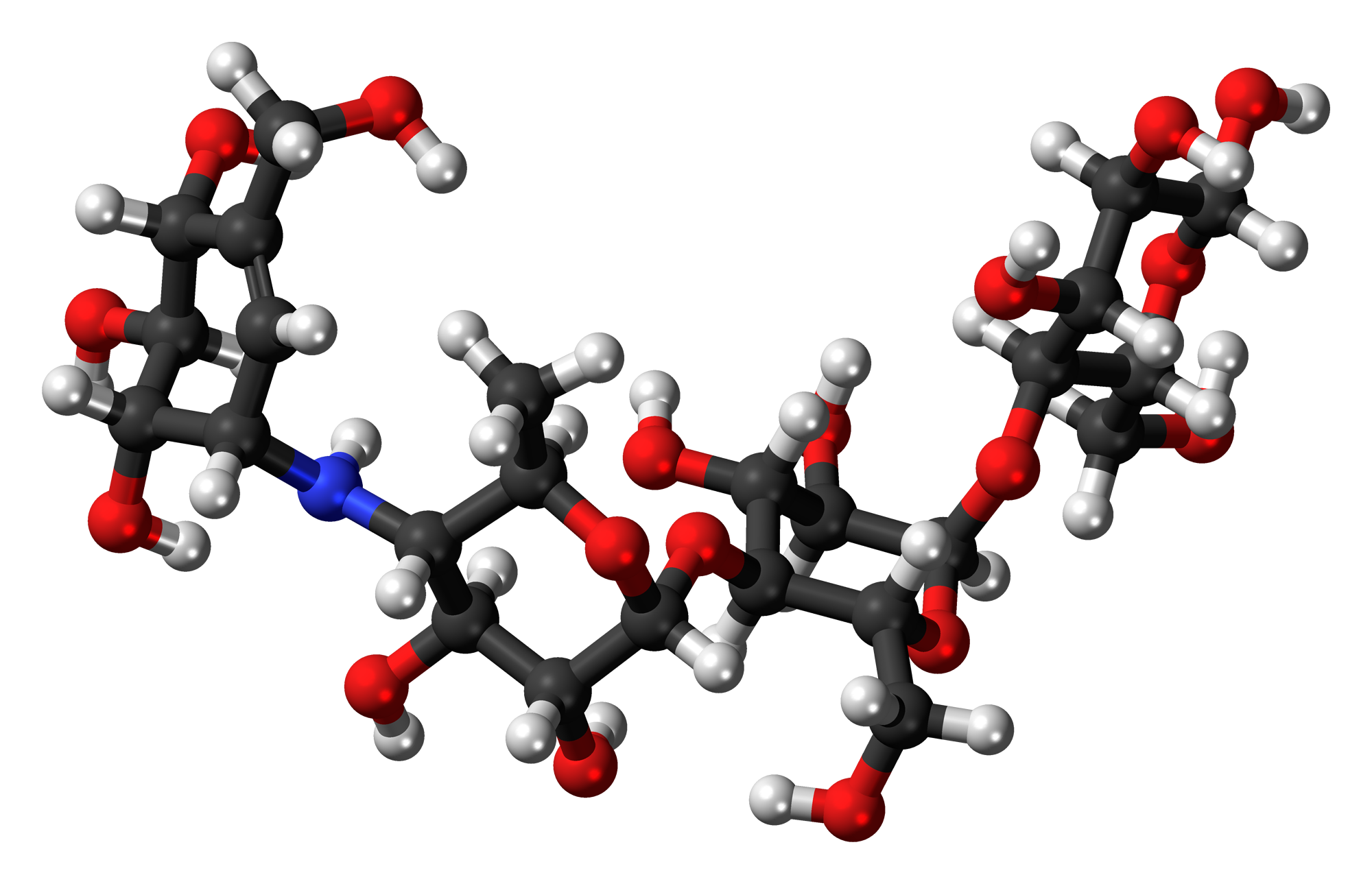

Clinical data
- Trade names: Glucobay, Precose, Prandase
- Other names: (2R,3R,4R,5S,6R)-5-{[(2R,3R,4R,5S,6R)-5- {[(2R,3R,4S,5S,6R)-3,4-dihydroxy-6-methyl- 5-{[(1S,4R,5S,6S)-4,5,6-trihydroxy-3- (hydroxymethyl)cyclohex-2-en-1-yl]amino} tetrahydro-2H-pyran-2-yl]oxy}-3,4-dihydroxy- 6-(hydroxymethyl)tetrahydro-2H-pyran-2-yl]oxy}- 6-(hydroxymethyl)tetrahydro-2H-pyran-2,3,4-triol
- AHFS/Drugs.com: Monograph
- MedlinePlus: a696015
- License data: US DailyMed: Acarbose
- Pregnancy category: AU: B3
- Routes of administration: By mouth
- ATC code: A10BF01 (WHO)

Legal status
- Legal status: UK: POM (Prescription only); US: ℞-only

Pharmacokinetic data
- Bioavailability: Extremely low
- Metabolism: Gastrointestinal tract
- Elimination half-life: 2 hours
- Excretion: Kidney (less than 2%)

Identifiers
- IUPAC name: O-4,6-Dideoxy-4-[[(1S,4R,5S,6S)-4,5,6-trihydroxy-3-(hydroxymethyl)-2-cyclohexen-1-yl]amino]-α-D-glucopyranosyl-(1→4)-O-α-D-glucopyranosyl-(1→4)-D-glucopyranose
- CAS Number: 56180-94-0
- PubChem CID: 444254
- IUPHAR/BPS: 6791
- DrugBank: DB00284
- ChemSpider: 392239
- UNII: T58MSI464G
- KEGG: D00216
- ChEMBL: ChEMBL1566
- CompTox Dashboard (EPA): DTXSID8046034
- ECHA InfoCard: 100.054.555

Chemical and physical data
- Formula: C_{25}H_{43}NO_{18}
- Molar mass: 645.608 g·mol^{−1}
- 3D model (JSmol): Interactive image
- SMILES: O([C@H]1[C@H](O)[C@@H](O)[C@H](O)O[C@@H]1CO)[C@H]4O[C@@H]([C@@H](O[C@H]3O[C@H](C)[C@@H](N[C@H]2/C=C(/CO)[C@@H](O)[C@H](O)[C@H]2O)[C@H](O)[C@H]3O)[C@H](O)[C@H]4O)CO
- InChI: InChI=1S/C25H43NO18/c1-6-11(26-8-2-7(3-27)12(30)15(33)13(8)31)14(32)19(37)24(40-6)43-22-10(5-29)42-25(20(38)17(22)35)44-21-9(4-28)41-23(39)18(36)16(21)34/h2,6,8-39H,3-5H2,1H3/t6-,8+,9-,10-,11-,12-,13+,14+,15+,16-,17-,18-,19-,20-,21-,22-,23-,24-,25-/m1/s1; Key:XUFXOAAUWZOOIT-SXARVLRPSA-N

Acarbose (INN) is an anti-diabetic drug used to treat diabetes mellitus type 2 and (in some countries), prediabetes. It is sold in Europe and China as Glucobay (Bayer AG), in North America as Precose (Bayer Pharmaceuticals), and in Canada as Prandase (Bayer AG).

Acarbose is a starch blocker that works by inhibiting alpha glucosidase, an intestinal enzyme that releases glucose from larger carbohydrates such as starch and sucrose. It is composed of an acarviosin moiety with a maltose at the reducing terminus. It can be degraded by gut bacteria.

Acarbose is inexpensive and popular in China, but not in the U.S. One physician explains that U.S. use is limited, because it is not potent enough to offset side effects of diarrhea and flatulence. However, a large 2013 study reported that "acarbose is effective, safe and well tolerated in a large cohort of Asian patients with type 2 diabetes." One possible explanation for the differing claims is that acarbose is significantly more effective in patients eating a relatively high-starch, Eastern diet.

== Medical uses ==
=== Efficacy ===
In type II diabetic patients, acarbose averages an absolute decrease of 0.8 percentage points in HbA_{1c}, which is a decrease of about 10% in typical HbA_{1c} values in diabetes studies. Individuals with higher baseline levels show higher reductions, about an 0.12% additional decrease for each point of baseline HbA_{1c}. Its effect on postprandial glucose, but not on HbA_{1c}, scales with dose. Among diabetic patients, acarbose may help reduce the damage done to blood vessels and kidneys by reducing glucose levels.

A Cochrane systematic review assessed the effect of alpha-glucosidase inhibitors in people with prediabetes, defined as impaired glucose tolerance, impaired fasting blood glucose, elevated glycated hemoglobin A1c (HbA_{1c}). It was found that acarbose reduced the incidence of diabetes mellitus type 2 when compared to placebo, however there was no conclusive evidence that acarbose, when compared to diet and exercise, metformin, placebo, or no intervention, improved all-cause mortality, reduced or increased risk of cardiovascular mortality, serious or non-serious adverse events, non-fatal stroke, congestive heart failure, or non-fatal myocardial infarction.

Several studies showed that glucosidase inhibitors and alpha-amylase inhibitors promote loss of visceral fat and waist by acting as calorie restriction mimetics (linked to their acarbose-like action).

=== Combination therapy ===
The combination of acarbose with metformin results in greater reductions of HbA1c, fasting blood glucose and post-prandial glucose than either agent alone.

== Adverse effects ==
Since acarbose prevents the degradation of complex carbohydrates into glucose, some carbohydrate will remain in the intestine and be delivered to the colon. In the colon, bacteria digest (ferment) the complex carbohydrates, causing gastrointestinal side-effects such as flatulence (78% of patients) and diarrhea (14% of patients). Since these effects are dose-related, in general it is advised to start with a low dose and gradually increase the dose to the desired amount. One study found that gastrointestinal side effects decreased significantly (from 50% to 15%) over 24 weeks, even on constant dosing. Sucrose is more likely to trigger GI side effects compared to starch.

Acarbose is associated with very rare elevated transaminases (19 out of 500,000). Even rarer cases of hepatitis has been reported with acarbose use. It usually goes away when the medicine is stopped. Liver enzymes should be checked before and during use of this medicine as a precaution. A 2016 meta-analysis confirms that alpha-glucosidase inhibitors, including acarbose, have a statistically significant link to elevated transaminase levels.

== Pharmacology ==
=== Mechanism of action ===
Acarbose inhibits enzymes (glycoside hydrolases) needed to digest carbohydrates, specifically, alpha-glucosidase enzymes in the brush border of the small intestines, and pancreatic alpha-amylase. It locks up the enzymes by mimicking the transition state of the substrate with its amine linkage. However, bacterial alpha-amylases from gut microbiome are able to degrade acarbose.

Pancreatic alpha-amylase hydrolyzes complex starches to oligosaccharides in the lumen of the small intestine, whereas the membrane-bound intestinal alpha-glucosidases hydrolyze oligosaccharides, trisaccharides, and disaccharides to glucose and other monosaccharides in the small intestine. Inhibition of these enzyme systems reduces the rate of digestion of complex carbohydrates. Less glucose is absorbed because the carbohydrates are not broken down into glucose molecules. In diabetic patients, the short-term effect of these drug therapies is to decrease current blood glucose levels; the long-term effect is a reduction in HbA_{1c} level.

=== Metabolism ===
Acarbose degradation is the unique feature of glycoside hydrolases in gut microbiota, acarbose degrading glucosidase, which hydrolyze acarbose into an acarviosine-glucose and glucose. Human enzymes do transform acarbose: the pancreatic alpha-amylase is able to perform a rearrangement reaction, moving the glucose unit in the "tail" maltose to the "head" of the molecule. Analog drugs with the "tail" glucose removed or flipped to an α(1-6) linkage resist this transformation.

It has been reported that the maltogenic alpha-amylase from Thermus sp. IM6501 (ThMA) and a cyclodextrinase (CDase) from Streptococcus pyogenes could hydrolyse acarbose to glucose and acarviosine-glucose, ThMA can further hydrolyze acarviosine-glucose into acarviosin and glucose. A cyclomaltodextrinase (CDase) from gut bacteria Lactobacillus plantarum degraded acarbose via two different modes of action to produce maltose and acarviosin, as well as glucose and acarviosine-glucose, suggest that acarbose resistance is caused by the human microbiome. The microbiome-derived acarbose kinases are also specific to phosphorylate and inactivate acarbose. The molecular modeling showed the interaction between gut bacterial acarbose degrading glucosidase and human α-amylase.

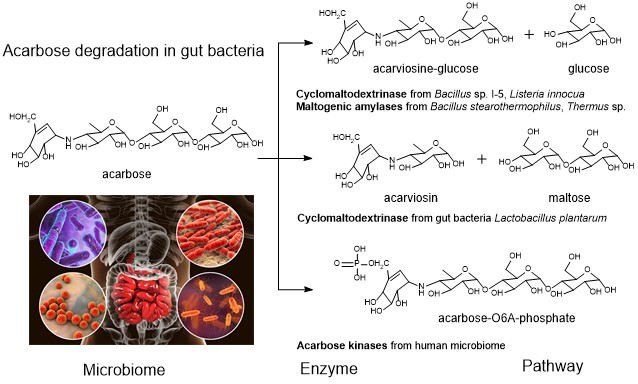
Acarbose is degraded by different enzymes in the gut microbiome

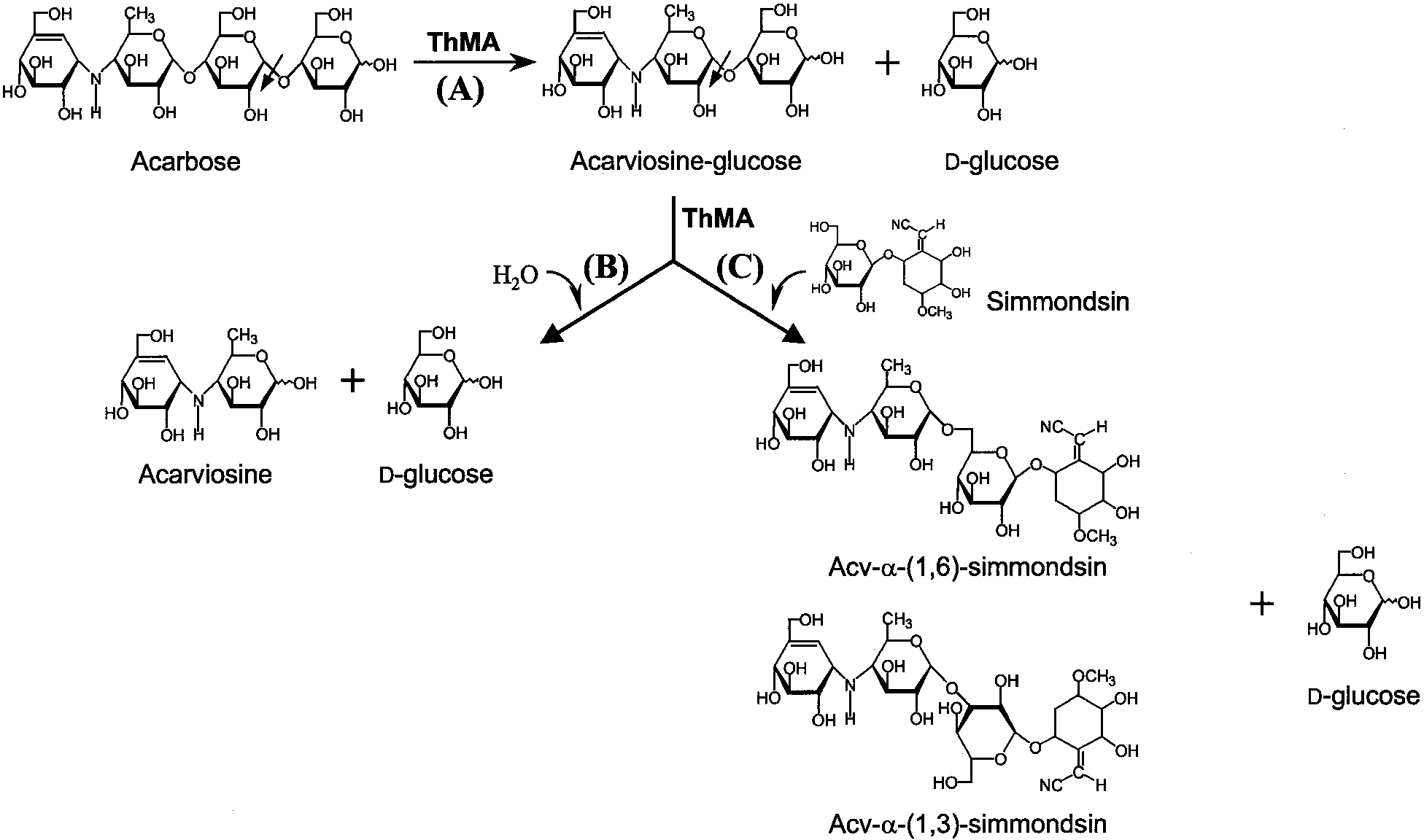
Acarbose degradation by gut bacterial maltogenic amylase

== Natural distribution ==
In nature, acarbose is synthesized by soil bacteria Actinoplanes sp through its precursor valienamine.

== In molecular biology ==
Acarbose is described chemically as a pseudotetrasaccharide, specifically a maltotetraose mimic inhibitor. As an inhibitor that mimics some natural substrates, it is useful for elucidating the structure of sugar-digesting enzymes, by binding into the same pocket.

== Research ==
Most studies investigating alpha-glucosidase and alpha-amylase inhibitory activity use acarbose as reference.

In human T2DM patients, acarbose reduces total triglyceride levels. Acarbose has a similar effect in non-T2DM patients with isolated familial hypertriglyceridemia.

In smaller samples of healthy human volunteers, acarbose increases postprandial GLP-1 levels.

In studies conducted by three independent laboratories by the US National Institute on Aging's intervention testing programme, acarbose was shown to extend the lifespan of female mice by 5% and of male mice by 22%.

A pooled analysis of data from 10 observational studies show that acarbose appears to reduce body weight irrespective of glycemic control in diabetic patients. The effect is more pronounced in patients of the female sex, South East Asian and East Asian ethnicity, younger age, higher body mass index, short duration of diabetes, or no previous treatment.
