= DCTP deaminase (dUMP-forming) =

Class of enzymes

Identifiers
- EC no.: 3.5.4.30

Databases
- BRENDA: enzyme data
- ExPASy: NiceZyme view
- KEGG: enzyme entry
- MetaCyc: metabolic pathway
- Rhea: reactions
- PDB structures: RCSB PDB PDBe PDBsum
Search
- PMC: articles
- PubMed: articles
- NCBI: proteins

dCTP deaminase (dUMP-forming) (EC 3.5.4.30) is an enzyme that catalyzes the hydrolysis of deoxycytidine triphosphate (cCTP) to deoxyuridine monophosphate (dUMP), with ammonia and pyrophosphate (PP_{i}) as byproducts:

deoxycytidine triphosphate

2 H_{2}O
NH_{3}

deoxyuridine monophosphate

+ PP_{i}

Most bacteria require two enzymes to form dUMP from dCTP, namely dCTP deaminase and dUTP diphosphatase. However, the archaeon, Methanococcus jannaschii, and the bacterium, Bacillus halodurans, use this single enzyme, which requires magnesium as Mg^{2+}, to carry out both functions.

This enzyme is a hydrolase, one acting on carbon-nitrogen bonds other than peptide bonds, specifically in cyclic amidines. The systematic name of this enzyme class is dCTP aminohydrolase (dUMP-forming).

== Structural studies ==
As of late 2007, 3 structures have been solved for this class of enzymes, with PDB accession codes PDB: 2HXB, PDB: 2HXD, and PDB: 2HXE.
