= DnaS =

Deoxyuridine 5'-triphosphate nucleotidohydrolase

Identifiers
- Symbol: dut
- Alt. symbols: dnaS; ECK3630; JW3615; sof
- NCBI gene: 948607
- UniProt: P06968

Other data
- EC number: 3.6.1.23
Search for
- Structures: Swiss-model
- Domains: InterPro

dnaS or dut is a gene involved in DNA replication in Escherichia coli. It encodes dUTP nucleotidohydrolase, an enzyme responsible for catalyzing the conversion of dUTP to dUMP, thereby ensuring that the organism's DNA contains the nucleobase thymine instead of uracil.

== See also ==
- DUT, the human version of this gene
- dnaA
- dnaB
- dnaC
- dnaE
- dnaG
- dnaH
- dnaI
- dnaN
- dnaP
- dnaQ
- dnaX
- dnaZ
