= Arginine finger =

Catalytic amino acid residue

In molecular biology, an arginine finger is an amino acid residue of some enzymes. Arginine fingers are often found in the protein superfamily of AAA+ ATPases, GTPases, and dUTPases, where they assist in the catalysis of the gamma phosphate or gamma and beta phosphates from ATP or GTP, which creates a release of energy which can be used to perform cellular work. They are also found in GTPase-activating proteins (GAP). Thus, they are essential for many forms of life, and are highly conserved. Arginine fingers function through non-covalent interactions. They may also assist in dimerization, and while they are found in a wide variety of enzymes, they are not ubiquitous.

== Role in catalytic mechanisms ==
Generally, the role of the arginine finger in catalysis is to function in transition state stabilization to allow water to perform a nucleophilic attack to cleave off a number of phosphate groups. However, there are exceptions, and arginine fingers can assist in other roles. Additionally, arginine fingers may be attached to different subunits or other proteins in a multiprotein complex. Arginine fingers sometimes interact with guanidinium during their role in catalysis.

=== dUTPases ===
Arginine fingers often work with other features in their assistance of catalysis. For example, in some trimeric dUTPases, such as those of M. tuberculosis, arginine fingers at the 64th and 140th residue can work with magnesium to cleave dUTP into dUMP and a pyrophosphate. The underlying mechanism of action for this is a nucleophilic attack; the positively charged magnesium ion (Mg^{2+}) pulls on an oxygen of the beta and gamma phosphates to allow water to hydrolyze the bond between the beta and alpha phosphates. The arginine fingers help stabilize the transition state. Arginine fingers often interact with other motifs such as the Walker motifs and to perform catalysis more efficiently.

=== Ras GTPases ===
Arginine fingers are also present in Ras GTPases, where they help cleave GTP to turn Ras off. Ras is a GTPase which functions in signal transduction to regulate cell growth and division. In addition to being positively charged, which helps arginine fingers function as a catalyst, the arginine finger in Ras displaces solvent molecules and creates an optional charge distribution. Like those of dUPTases, the arginine fingers of Ras GTPases are assisted by a magnesium ion. Furthermore, multiple arginine finger residues can all point towards the same point, thus focusing their effect. Mutations affecting the arginine fingers of Ras lead to trouble catalyzing GTP by factors of around two to five orders of magnitude. Thus, as Ras is an oncogene and is activated and deactivated by the hydrolysis of GTP, mutations in Ras's arginine finger residues can lead to cancer. Glutamate also plays a role near arginine fingers and is stabilized by the arginines' backbone chain carboxyl groups, which are known as knuckles.

=== Heterotrimeric G proteins ===
In heterotrimeric G proteins, catalysis of GTP can be assisted by aluminum tetrafluoride (AlF_{4}) and RGS4. Heterotrimeric G proteins are larger three-part proteins serve in signal transduction of many pathways. The catalytic mechanism for GTP hydrolysis in heterotrimeric G proteins consists of an active state where catalysis is likely to occur and an inactive state where catalysis is unlikely. In the active state, AlF_{4} stabilizes the transition state and points the arginine finger residue towards GTP. This causes increased charge density on the beta phosphate of GTP and planarization of the gamma phosphate, which creates an opening and reduces steric hindrance for water to hydrolyze the phosphoanhydride beta-gamma bond. This is because the gamma phosphate's bond to the beta phosphate bends, exposing its connection and allowing the subsequent nucleophilic substitution reaction initiated by water. The complex formed with RGS4 assists in this process by creating strain on the bond between the gamma and beta phosphates and assisting in distributing more charge onto the beta phosphate.

=== ATP synthase ===
ATP synthase consists of a F_{1} and F_{0} subunit. The F_{1} subunit contains alpha and beta subunits of its own which can assist in the formation of ATP, or hydrolyze it to serve as a proton pump. Though most catalytic actions happen on the beta subunits, the alpha subunits each contain an arginine finger. The role of the arginine finger in ATP synthase is akin to the function of the arginine finger residues of G proteins; to help split ATP. For example, if the arginine of the arginine finger is substituted by lysine, possibly due to a missense mutation, the αR364K mutant results. In the αR364K mutant, the ability of ATP synthase to hydrolyze ATP is decreased around a thousandfold compared to the wild type.

=== RecQ helicase ===
A RecQ helicase is one of a family of helicases that helps reduce sister chromatid exchange during meiosis to lower mutation rates. RecQ helicases are found in many organisms, ranging from E. coli to humans. One of these helicases, the Bloom syndrome protein, contains an arginine finger which assists in its hydrolysis of ATP. In humans, the arginine finger of the Bloom syndrome protein is Arg982. The RecQ helicase, along with most proteins containing arginine fingers, is inhibited by sodium orthovanadate, which interferes with the arginine finger residue.
