= Thymidine-triphosphatase =

Class of enzymes

Identifiers
- EC no.: 3.6.1.39
- CAS no.: 37367-74-1

Databases
- BRENDA: enzyme data
- ExPASy: NiceZyme view
- KEGG: enzyme entry
- MetaCyc: metabolic pathway
- Rhea: reactions
- PDB structures: RCSB PDB PDBe PDBsum
- Gene Ontology: AmiGO / QuickGO
Search
- PMC: articles
- PubMed: articles
- NCBI: proteins

Thymidine-triphosphatase (EC 3.6.1.39) is a human enzyme that catalyzes the hydrolysis of the nucleoside triphosphate, thymidine triphosphate, to thymidine diphosphate and orthophosphate (P_{i}):

thymidine triphosphate
H_{2}O
P_{i}
thymidine diphosphate

This enzyme is a hydrolase, specifically one acting on acid anhydrides in phosphorus-containing anhydrides. The systematic name of this enzyme class is dTTP nucleotidohydrolase. Other names in use include thymidine triphosphate nucleotidohydrolase, dTTPase, and deoxythymidine-5'-triphosphatase.
