= Thymidine diphosphate glucose =

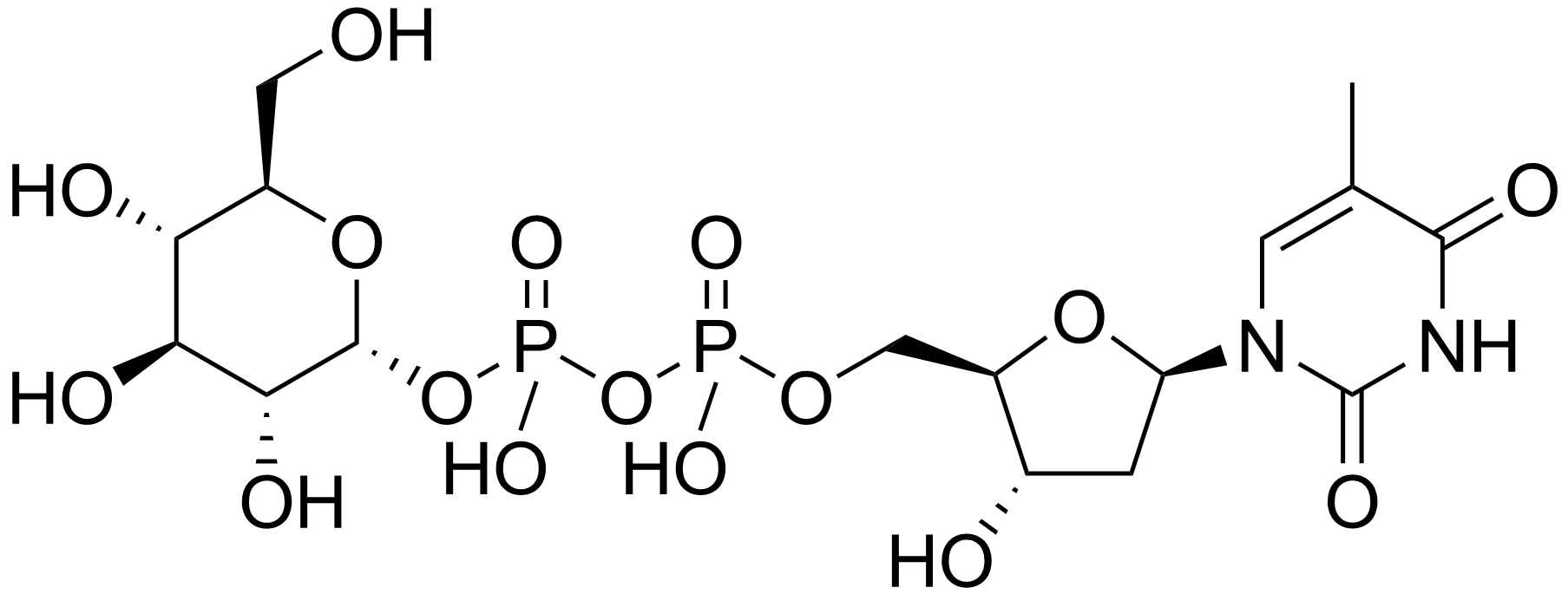

Names
- IUPAC name Thymidine 5′-(α-D-glucopyranosyl trihydrogen diphosphate)
- Systematic IUPAC name O^{1}-{[(2R,3S,5R)-3-Hydroxy-5-(5-methyl-2,4-dioxo-3,4-dihydropyrimidin-1(3H)-yl)oxolan-2-yl]methyl} O^{3}-[(2R,3R,4S,5S,6R)-3,4,5-trihydroxy-6-(hydroxymethyl)oxan-2-yl] dihydrogen diphosphate
- Other names TDP-glucose; dTDP-glucose

Identifiers
CAS Number	2196-62-5
3D model (JSmol)	Interactive image; Interactive image
ChEBI	CHEBI:15700
ChEMBL	ChEMBL412989
ChemSpider	391476
PubChem CID	25202390; 443210
UNII	Q9XRK94HEF
CompTox Dashboard (EPA)	DTXSID70332067
- InChI: InChI=1S/C16H26N2O16P2/c1-6-3-18(16(25)17-14(6)24)10-2-7(20)9(31-10)5-30-35(26,27)34-36(28,29)33-15-13(23)12(22)11(21)8(4-19)32-15/h3,7-13,15,19-23H,2,4-5H2,1H3,(H,26,27)(H,28,29)(H,17,24,25)/t7-,8+,9+,10+,11+,12-,13+,15+/m0/s1 Key: YSYKRGRSMLTJNL-URARBOGNSA-N
- SMILES: CC1=CN(C(=O)NC1=O)[C@H]2C[C@@H]([C@H](O2)COP(=O)(O)OP(=O)(O)O[C@@H]3[C@@H]([C@H]([C@@H]([C@H](O3)CO)O)O)O)O; O=C1\C(=C/N(C(=O)N1)[C@@H]2O[C@@H]([C@@H](O)C2)COP(=O)(O)OP(=O)(O)O[C@H]3O[C@@H]([C@@H](O)[C@H](O)[C@H]3O)CO)C

Properties
Chemical formula	C_{16}H_{26}N_{2}O_{16}P_{2}
Molar mass	564.330 g·mol^{−1}
- Except where otherwise noted, data are given for materials in their standard state (at 25 °C [77 °F], 100 kPa). verify (what is ?) Infobox references

Thymidine diphosphate glucose (often abbreviated dTDP-glucose or TDP-glucose) is a nucleotide-linked sugar consisting of deoxythymidine diphosphate linked to glucose. It is the starting compound for the syntheses of many deoxysugars.

== Biosynthesis ==
DTDP-glucose is produced by the enzyme glucose-1-phosphate thymidylyltransferase and is synthesized from dTTP and glucose-1-phosphate. Pyrophosphate is a byproduct of the reaction.

== Uses within the cell ==
DTDP-glucose goes on to form a variety of compounds in nucleotide sugars metabolism. Many bacteria utilize dTDP-glucose to form exotic sugars that are incorporated into their lipopolysaccharides or into secondary metabolites such as antibiotics. During the syntheses of many of these exotic sugars, dTDP-glucose undergoes a combined oxidation/reduction reaction via the enzyme dTDP-glucose 4,6-dehydratase, producing dTDP-4-keto-6-deoxy-glucose.
