= DCTP diphosphatase =

Class of enzymes

dCTP diphosphatase

Identifiers
- EC no.: 3.6.1.12
- CAS no.: 9024-87-7

Databases
- BRENDA: enzyme data
- ExPASy: NiceZyme view
- KEGG: enzyme entry
- MetaCyc: metabolic pathway
- Rhea: reactions
- PDB structures: RCSB PDB PDBe PDBsum
- Gene Ontology: AmiGO / QuickGO
Search
- PMC: articles
- PubMed: articles
- NCBI: proteins

dCTP diphosphatase (EC 3.6.1.12) is an enzyme characterised from a bacteriophage-infected Escherichia coli that catalyzes the hydrolysis of deoxycytidine triphosphate (dCTP) to deoxycytidine monophosphate and pyrophosphate (PP_{i}):

deoxycytidine triphosphate
H_{2}O
PP_{i}
deoxycytidine monophosphate

The enzyme has been linked to other members of a group of diphosphatases and their common structural features have been described.

A related mammalian enzyme is most active on dCTP derivatives including 5-iodocytosine.

This enzyme is a hydrolase, specifically one acting on acid anhydrides in phosphorus-containing anhydrides. The systematic name of this enzyme class is dCTP nucleotidohydrolase. Other names in common use include deoxycytidine-triphosphatase, dCTPase, dCTP pyrophosphatase, deoxycytidine triphosphatase, deoxy-CTPase, and dCTPase.
