= DUT =

DUT may refer to:

== Education ==
- Da Nang University of Technology, in Vietnam
- Dalian University of Technology, in China
- Delft University of Technology, in the Netherlands
- Durban University of Technology in South Africa
- Diplôme universitaire de technologie, a French undergraduate university degree in technology

== Other uses ==
- Device under test, an item of equipment being tested
- DUT (gene)
- Drinking-up time, a former feature of United Kingdom alcohol licensing law
- DUT1 or DUT, a value used for time correction
- Unalaska Airport (IATA airport code "DUT"), in Alaska, U.S.
- D. Ut., an abbreviation for the United States District Court for the District of Utah
- Darjah Utama Temasek, Singapore's highest civilian honour
