= LVW =

LVW may refer to:

- Longview station (station code LVW), Longview, Texas, USA; an Amtrak train station
- League of Victorian Wheelmen (LVW), a professional-cyclist bicycle federation in the Australian state of Victoria, predecessor of Cycling Victoria
- LiveWire (company) (NYSE stock ticker LVW), a U.S. electric motorcycle company
- "Landing Vehicle, Wheeled" (LVW), U.S. Navy designation for the DUKW ("Duck", Duplex Universal Carrier, Wheeled) amphibious truck
- Loaded vehicle weight (LVW): see automotive acronyms and abbreviations
- Left ventricle weight (LVW), in anatomy and medicine
- Lint voor Verwonding (LvW), South African campaign medal, for the First and Second Boer Wars

== See also ==
- Glucose-1-phosphate thymidylyltransferase (PDB code: 1LVW)
