= Galactose-1-phosphate thymidylyltransferase =

Class of enzymes

Identifiers
- EC no.: 2.7.7.32
- CAS no.: 9023-25-0

Databases
- IntEnz: IntEnz view
- BRENDA: BRENDA entry
- ExPASy: NiceZyme view
- KEGG: KEGG entry
- MetaCyc: metabolic pathway
- PRIAM: profile
- PDB structures: RCSB PDB PDBe PDBsum
- Gene Ontology: AmiGO / QuickGO
Search
- PMC: articles
- PubMed: articles
- NCBI: proteins

Galactose-1-phosphate thymidylyltransferase (EC 2.7.7.32) is an enzyme that catalyzes the chemical reaction

thymidine triphosphate
+
α-D-galactose 1-phosphate
PP_{i}
dTDP-D-galactose

The enzyme characterised from Streptococcus faecalis combines thymidine triphosphate and α-D-galactose 1-phosphate to give dTDP-D-galactose, with pyrophosphate (PP_{i}) as a byproduct.

This enzyme is a transferase, specifically one transferring phosphorus-containing nucleotide groups (nucleotidyltransferases). The systematic name of this enzyme class is dTTP:alpha-D-galactose-1-phosphate thymidylyltransferase. Other names in common use include dTDP galactose pyrophosphorylase, galactose 1-phosphate thymidylyl transferase, thymidine diphosphogalactose pyrophosphorylase, thymidine triphosphate:alpha-D-galactose 1-phosphate, and thymidylyltransferase.
