= DCMP deaminase =

Protein-coding gene in the species Homo sapiens

DCTD

Identifiers
- Aliases: DCTD, dCMP deaminase
- External IDs: OMIM: 607638; MGI: 2444529; GeneCards: DCTD
Available structures
PDB	Ortholog search: PDBe RCSB
PDB	List of PDB id codes 2W4L
Enzyme activity
EC #	BRENDA	ExPASy	KEGG	MetaCyc
3.5.4.12	↗	↗	↗	↗

Gene location (Human)
Chr.	Chromosome 4 (human)
Band	4q35.1	Start	182,890,060 bp
Band	4q35.1	End	182,917,936 bp

Gene location (Mouse)
Chr.	Chromosome 8 (mouse)
Band	8|8 B1.1- B1.2	Start	48,552,127 bp
Band	8|8 B1.1- B1.2	End	48,606,268 bp
RNA expression pattern
Bgee	Human / Mouse (ortholog); Top expressed in: stromal cell of endometrium; right adrenal gland; left adrenal gland; gallbladder; right adrenal cortex; islet of Langerhans; left adrenal cortex; left lobe of thyroid gland; right lobe of thyroid gland; canal of the cervix / Top expressed in: genital tubercle; tail of embryo; zygote; hand; secondary oocyte; epiblast; morula; embryo; embryo; primitive streak; More reference expression data
BioGPS	n/a
Gene ontology
Molecular function	zinc ion binding; catalytic activity; hydrolase activity; protein binding; metal ion binding; identical protein binding; dCMP deaminase activity
Cellular component	cytosol; cytoplasm
Biological process	pyrimidine nucleotide metabolic process; metabolism; nucleotide biosynthetic process; nucleobase-containing small molecule interconversion; dUMP biosynthetic process; dTMP biosynthetic process
Sources:Amigo / QuickGO
Orthologs
Databases	NCBI: entry; OMA: entry
Species	Human	Mouse
Entrez	1635	320685
Ensembl	ENSG00000129187	ENSMUSG00000031562
UniProt	P32321	Q8K2D6
RefSeq (mRNA)	NM_001012732; NM_001921; NM_001351743; NM_001351744; NM_001351745 NM_001351747; NM_001351748; NM_001351750; NM_001351753	NM_001161515; NM_001161516; NM_178788
RefSeq (protein)	NP_001012750; NP_001912; NP_001338672; NP_001338673; NP_001338674 NP_001338676; NP_001338677; NP_001338679; NP_001338682	NP_001154987; NP_001154988; NP_848903
Location (UCSC)	Chr 4: 182.89 – 182.92 Mb	Chr 8: 48.55 – 48.61 Mb
PubMed search
- Wikidata
View/Edit Human	View/Edit Mouse

dCMP deaminase
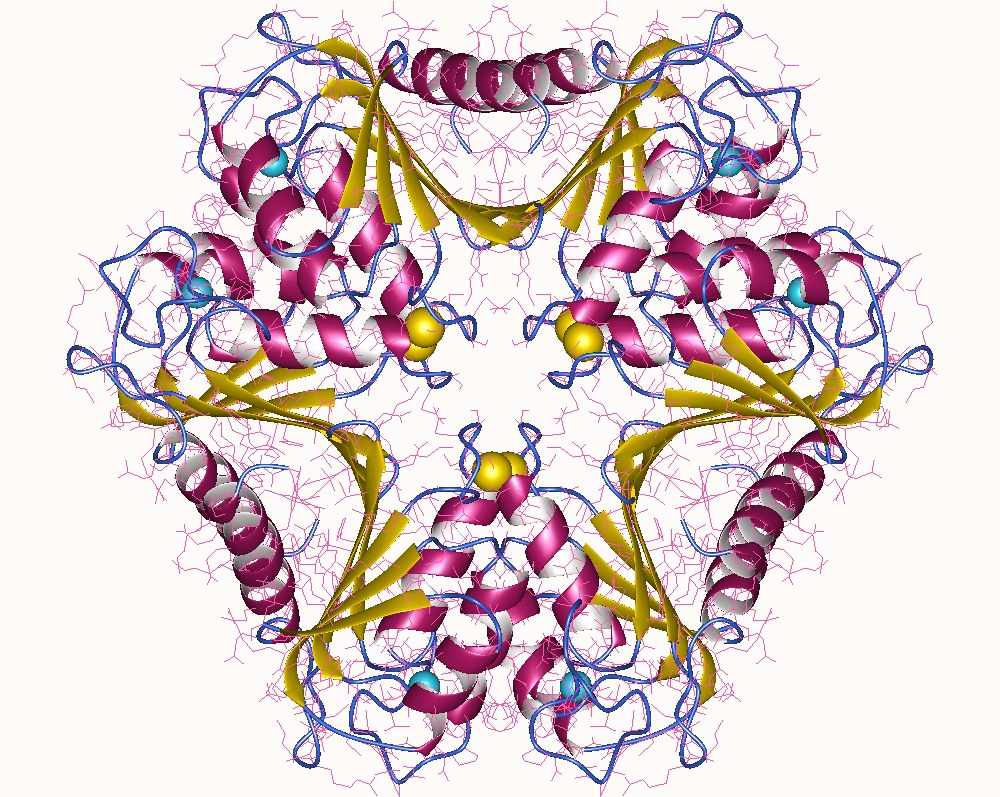
- Deoxycytidylate deaminase hexamer, Cyanophage s-tim5

Identifiers
- EC no.: 3.5.4.12
- CAS no.: 9026-92-0

Databases
- BRENDA: enzyme data
- ExPASy: NiceZyme view
- KEGG: enzyme entry
- MetaCyc: metabolic pathway
- Rhea: reactions
- PDB structures: RCSB PDB PDBe PDBsum
- Gene Ontology: AmiGO / QuickGO
Search
- PMC: articles
- PubMed: articles
- NCBI: proteins

dCMP deaminase (EC 3.5.4.12) is an enzyme which in humans is encoded by the gene DCTD. The name refers to its enzymatic activity which converts deoxycytidine monophosphate to deoxyuridine monophosphate and ammonia. Alternate names for the enzyme include deoxycytidylate deaminase, deoxy-CMP-deaminase, deoxycytidylate aminohydrolase, deoxycytidine monophosphate deaminase, and deoxycytidine-5'-phosphate deaminase, deoxycytidine-5'-monophosphate aminohydrolase.

deoxycytidine monophosphate
H_{2}O
NH_{3}
deoxyuridine monophosphate

The enzyme is part of the metabolic pathway for pyrimidines. A modified version has been used in a production system for uridine monophosphate.
