= DCTP deaminase =

Class of enzymes

dCTP deaminase

Identifiers
- EC no.: 3.5.4.13
- CAS no.: 37289-18-2

Databases
- BRENDA: enzyme data
- ExPASy: NiceZyme view
- KEGG: enzyme entry
- MetaCyc: metabolic pathway
- Rhea: reactions
- PDB structures: RCSB PDB PDBe PDBsum
- Gene Ontology: AmiGO / QuickGO
Search
- PMC: articles
- PubMed: articles
- NCBI: proteins

dCTP deaminase (EC 3.5.4.13) is an enzyme characterised from a phage-infected Bacillus subtilis that catalyzes the hydrolysis of deoxycytidine triphosphate (dCTP) to deoxyuridine triphosphate:

deoxycytidine triphosphate
H_{2}O
NH_{3}
deoxyuridine triphosphate

Although mainly a bacterial enzyme, it has also been found in vertebrates.

This enzyme is a hydrolase, one acting on carbon-nitrogen bonds other than peptide bonds, specifically in cyclic amidines. The systematic name of this enzyme class is dCTP aminohydrolase. Other names in use include deoxycytidine triphosphate deaminase, and 5-methyl-dCTP deaminase.

== Structural studies ==
As of late 2007, 9 structures have been solved for this class of enzymes, with PDB accession codes PDB: 1OGH, PDB: 1PKH, PDB: 1PKJ, PDB: 1PKK, PDB: 1XS1, PDB: 1XS4, PDB: 1XS6, PDB: 2J4H, and PDB: 2J4Q.
