= DUTP diphosphatase =

Class of enzymes

dUTP diphosphatase

Identifiers
- EC no.: 3.6.1.23
- CAS no.: 37289-34-2

Databases
- BRENDA: enzyme data
- ExPASy: NiceZyme view
- KEGG: enzyme entry
- MetaCyc: metabolic pathway
- Rhea: reactions
- PDB structures: RCSB PDB PDBe PDBsum
- Gene Ontology: AmiGO / QuickGO
Search
- PMC: articles
- PubMed: articles
- NCBI: proteins

dUTPase
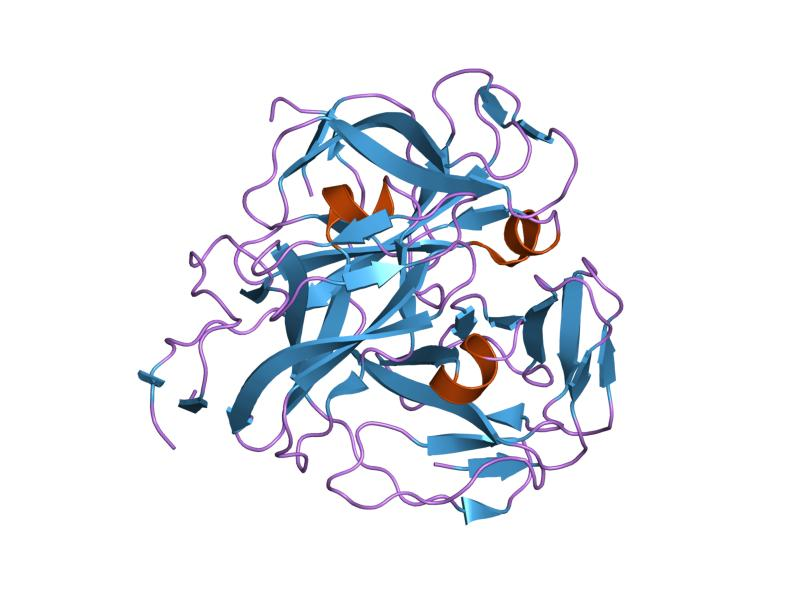
- crystal structures of feline immunodeficiency virus dutp pyrophosphatase and its nucleotide complexes in three crystal forms.

Identifiers
- Symbol: dUTPase
- Pfam: PF00692
- Pfam clan: CL0153
- InterPro: IPR008180
- SCOP2: 1dup / SCOPe / SUPFAM
Available protein structures:
- PDB: IPR008180 PF00692 (ECOD; PDBsum)
- AlphaFold: IPR008180; PF00692

dUTPase_2
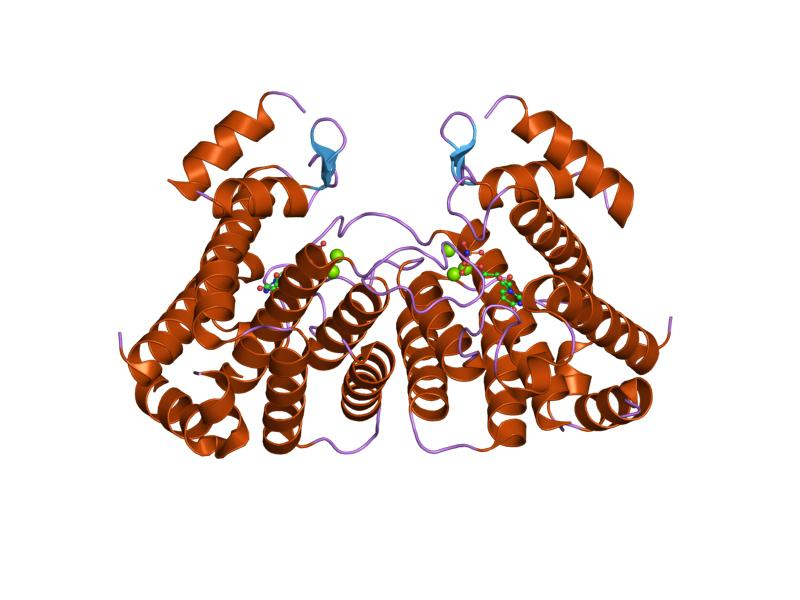
- the crystal structure of a complex of campylobacter jejuni dutpase with substrate analogue dupnhp

Identifiers
- Symbol: dUTPase_2
- Pfam: PF08761
- Pfam clan: CL0231
- InterPro: IPR014871
- SCOP2: 1w2y / SCOPe / SUPFAM
Available protein structures:
- PDB: IPR014871 PF08761 (ECOD; PDBsum)
- AlphaFold: IPR014871; PF08761

dUTP diphosphatase (EC 3.6.1.23) is an enzyme that catalyzes the hydrolysis of deoxyuridine triphosphate (dUTP) to deoxyuridine monophosphate (dUMP) and pyrophosphate (PP_{i}):

dUTP
H_{2}O
PP_{i}
dUMP

This enzyme has a dual function: on one hand, it removes dUTP from the deoxynucleotide pool, which reduces the probability of this base being incorporated into DNA by DNA polymerases, while on the other hand, it produces the thymidine triphosphate precursor dUMP. Lack or inhibition of dUTPase action leads to harmful perturbations in the nucleotide pool resulting in increased uracil content of DNA that activates a hyperactive futile cycle of DNA repair. In human cancer cells, the enzyme allows tumours to resist drugs which target thymidylate metabolism.

== Structural studies ==
As of late 2007, 48 structures have been solved for this class of enzymes, with PDB accession codes PDB: 1DUC, PDB: 1DUD, PDB: 1DUN, PDB: 1DUP, PDB: 1DUT, PDB: 1EU5, PDB: 1EUW, PDB: 1F7D, PDB: 1F7K, PDB: 1F7N, PDB: 1F7O, PDB: 1F7P, PDB: 1F7Q, PDB: 1F7R, PDB: 1MQ7, PDB: 1OGH, PDB: 1OGK, PDB: 1OGL, PDB: 1PKH, PDB: 1PKJ, PDB: 1PKK, PDB: 1RN8, PDB: 1RNJ, PDB: 1SEH, PDB: 1SIX, PDB: 1SJN, PDB: 1SLH, PDB: 1SM8, PDB: 1SMC, PDB: 1SNF, PDB: 1SYL, PDB: 1VYQ, PDB: 1W2Y, PDB: 2BSY, PDB: 2BT1, PDB: 2CJE, PDB: 2D4L, PDB: 2D4M, PDB: 2D4N, PDB: 2HQU, PDB: 2HR6, PDB: 2HRM, PDB: 2OKB, PDB: 2OKD, PDB: 2OKE, PDB: 2OL0, PDB: 2OL1, and PDB: 2PY4.

There are at least two structurally distinct families of dUTPases. The crystal structure of human dUTPase reveals that each subunit of the dUTPase trimer folds into an eight-stranded jelly-roll beta barrel, with the C-terminal beta strands interchanged among the subunits. The structure is similar to that of the Escherichia coli enzyme, despite low sequence homology between the two enzymes.

The second family has a novel all-alpha fold, members of this family are unrelated to the all-beta fold found in dUTPases of the majority of organisms.

== Nomenclature ==
This enzyme is a hydrolase, specifically one acting on acid anhydrides in phosphorus-containing anhydrides. The systematic name of this enzyme class is dUTP nucleotidohydrolase. Other names in use include deoxyuridine-triphosphatase, dUTPase, dUTP pyrophosphatase, desoxyuridine 5'-triphosphate nucleotidohydrolase, and desoxyuridine 5'-triphosphatase.

== See also ==
- DUT, the gene that codes for this enzyme in humans
- DnaS or dut, the gene that codes for this enzyme in E. coli
