= DTDP-glucose 4,6-dehydratase =

dTDP-glucose 4,6-dehydratase

Identifiers
- EC no.: 4.2.1.46
- CAS no.: 37259-54-4
- Alt. names: RmlB

Databases
- BRENDA: enzyme data
- ExPASy: NiceZyme view
- KEGG: enzyme entry
- MetaCyc: metabolic pathway
- Rhea: reactions
- PDB structures: RCSB PDB PDBe PDBsum
- Gene Ontology: AmiGO / QuickGO
Search
- PMC: articles
- PubMed: articles
- NCBI: proteins

The enzyme dTDP-glucose 4,6-dehydratase (EC 4.2.1.46) catalyzes the chemical reaction

dTDP-glucose $\rightleftharpoons$ dTDP-4-dehydro-6-deoxy-D-glucose + H_{2}O

== Structure and mechanism of action ==
The first protein structures of a dTDP-glucose 4,6-dehydratase (RmlB) were completed by Jim Thoden in the Hazel Holden lab (University of Wisconsin–Madison) and Simon Allard in the Jim Naismith lab (University of St Andrews). Further structural, mutagenic, and enzymatic studies by both groups, along with important mechanistic work by the W. Wallace Cleland and Perry Frey groups have led to a good understanding of this enzyme. In brief summary, the enzyme is a dimeric protein with a Rossmann fold; it uses the tightly bound coenzyme NAD^{+} for transiently oxidizing the substrate, activating it for the dehydration step.

== Nomenclature ==
This enzyme belongs to the family of lyases, specifically the hydro-lyases, which cleave carbon-oxygen bonds. The systematic name of this enzyme class is dTDP-glucose 4,6-hydro-lyase (dTDP-4-dehydro-6-deoxy-D-glucose-forming). Other names in common use include thymidine diphosphoglucose oxidoreductase, TDP-glucose oxidoreductase, RmlB, DESIV, and dTDP-glucose 4,6-hydro-lyase. This enzyme participates in 4 metabolic pathways: nucleotide sugars metabolism, streptomycin biosynthesis, polyketide sugar unit biosynthesis, and biosynthesis of vancomycin group antibiotics.
