= DUT (gene) =

Protein-coding gene in the species Homo sapiens

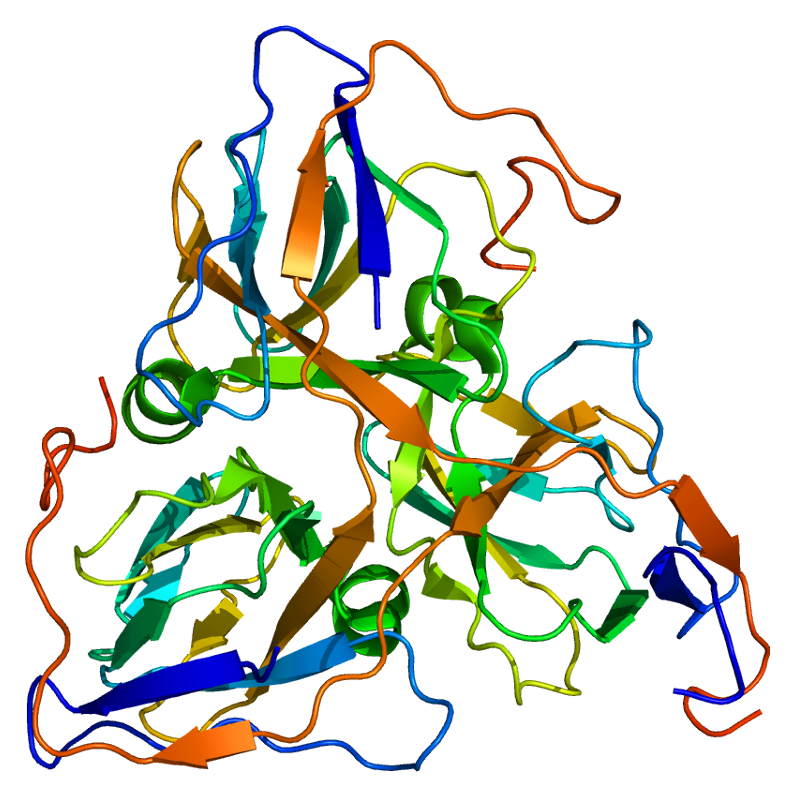
Available structures
PDB	Ortholog search: PDBe RCSB
PDB	List of PDB id codes 1Q5H, 1Q5U, 2HQU, 3ARA, 3ARN, 3EHW, 4MZ5, 4MZ6

Identifiers
- Aliases: DUT, dUTPase, deoxyuridine triphosphatase
- External IDs: OMIM: 601266; MGI: 1346051; HomoloGene: 31475; GeneCards: DUT; OMA:DUT - orthologs

Gene location (Human)
Chr.	Chromosome 15 (human)
Band	15q21.1	Start	48,331,011 bp
Band	15q21.1	End	48,343,373 bp

Gene location (Mouse)
Chr.	Chromosome 2 (mouse)
Band	2 F1|2 61.33 cM	Start	125,089,110 bp
Band	2 F1|2 61.33 cM	End	125,100,528 bp
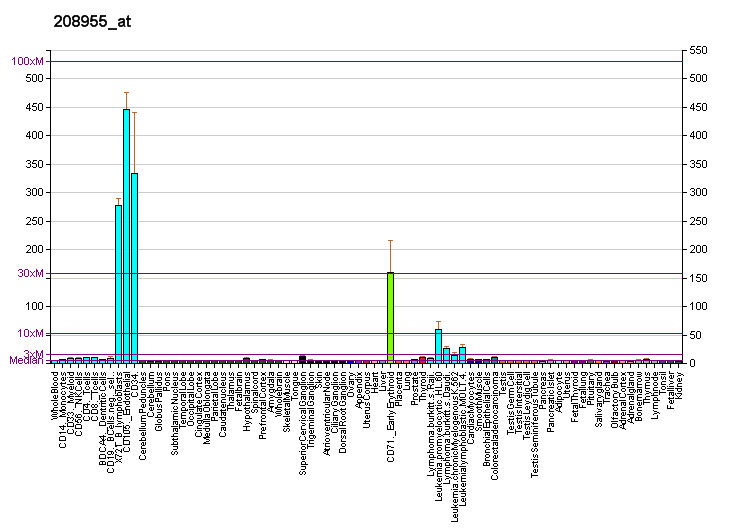

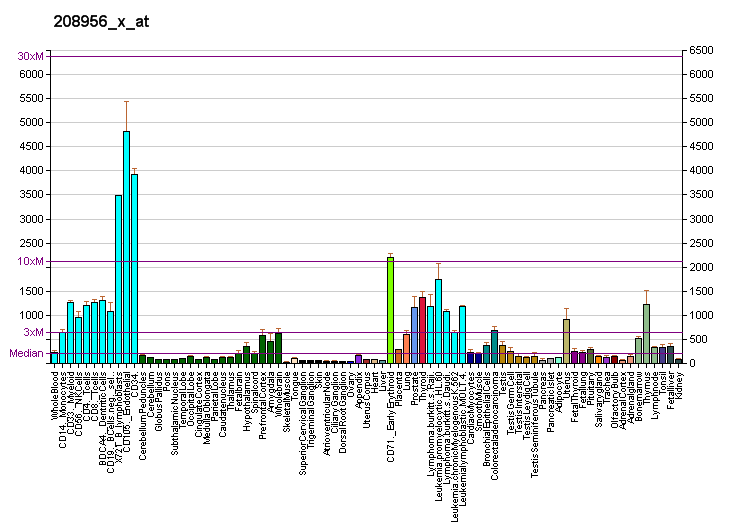
RNA expression pattern
Bgee	Human / Mouse (ortholog); Top expressed in: pylorus; trabecular bone; trigeminal ganglion; caput epididymis; superior surface of tongue; urethra; lactiferous duct; renal medulla; corpus epididymis; mucosa of paranasal sinus / Top expressed in: primitive streak; embryo; embryo; ventricular zone; endocardial cushion; medial ganglionic eminence; otic placode; fetal liver hematopoietic progenitor cell; somite; abdominal wall; More reference expression data
BioGPS	More reference expression data
Gene ontology
Molecular function	protein binding; hydrolase activity; RNA binding; magnesium ion binding; dUTP diphosphatase activity
Cellular component	extracellular exosome; nucleus; mitochondrion; nucleoplasm
Biological process	nucleotide metabolic process; DNA replication; dUTP metabolic process; nucleobase-containing compound metabolic process; nucleobase-containing small molecule interconversion; dUMP biosynthetic process; dUTP catabolic process
Sources:Amigo / QuickGO
Orthologs
Species	Human	Mouse
Entrez	1854	110074
Ensembl	ENSG00000128951	ENSMUSG00000027203
UniProt	P33316	Q9CQ43
RefSeq (mRNA)	NM_001025248; NM_001025249; NM_001948; NM_001330286	NM_001159646; NM_023595
RefSeq (protein)	NP_001020419; NP_001020420; NP_001317215; NP_001939	NP_001153118; NP_076084
Location (UCSC)	Chr 15: 48.33 – 48.34 Mb	Chr 2: 125.09 – 125.1 Mb
PubMed search
- Wikidata
View/Edit Human	View/Edit Mouse

DUTP pyrophosphatase, also known as DUT, is an enzyme which in humans is encoded by the DUT gene on chromosome 15.

This gene encodes an essential enzyme of nucleotide metabolism. The encoded protein forms a ubiquitous, homotrimeric enzyme that hydrolyzes dUTP to dUMP and pyrophosphate. This reaction serves two cellular purposes: providing a precursor (dUMP) for the synthesis of thymine nucleotides needed for DNA replication, and limiting intracellular pools of dUTP. Elevated levels of dUTP lead to increased incorporation of uracil into DNA, which induces extensive excision repair mediated by uracil glycosylase. This repair process, resulting in the removal and reincorporation of dUTP, is self-defeating and leads to DNA fragmentation and cell death. Alternative splicing of this gene leads to different isoforms that localize to either the mitochondrion or nucleus. A related pseudogene is located on chromosome 19.

== Structure ==
In humans, this gene encodes a homotrimeric enzyme with two isoforms characterized by their distinct subcellular localizations: the nuclear isoform (DUT-N) and mitochondrial isoform (DUT-M).

=== Gene ===
Northern blot analysis reveals distinct mRNA transcripts for DUT-N (1.1 kb) and DUT-M (1.4 kb). The isoforms are produced from alternative splicing at different 5' exons, with the first exon of DUT-N occurring 767 base pairs downstream of the first exon in DUT-M. Regulation at different promoters has been proposed to account for the differential expression of these isoforms.

=== Protein ===
The mature forms of DUT-N (22 kDa) and DUT-M (23 kDa) are nearly identical except for a short N-terminal region present in DUT-M. The DUT-M precursor (31 kDa) contains an arginine-rich, 69-residue mitochondrial targeting sequence which undergoes post-translational cleavage to effect mitochondrial import. Meanwhile, the monopartite NLS sequence is critical for the function and nuclear localization of DUT-N, which would otherwise accumulate in the cytoplasm. Though both isoforms contain the NLS, the sequence in DUT-M is sequestered away from cognate karyopherins. The isoelectric points of DUT-N (6.0) and DUT-M (8.1) correspond to the pH of their respective subcellular compartments.

DUT is a homotrimer with three active sites formed by each of its three subunits. Typically, each subunit forms an eight-stranded barrel that swaps C-terminal β-strands with the other subunits to assemble into the trimer structure. In addition to the β-strand swapping, these subunits interact via extended bimolecular interfaces and three-fold central channel. As a member of the dUTPase family, DUT requires the presence of a divalent metal ion such as Mg2+ for their enzymatic function. DUT-N also contains a consensus cyclin-dependent kinase phosphorylation site that is phosphorylated at the serine as part of its cell cycle regulation.

== Function ==
DUT is a member of the dUTPase family, which is known for catalyzing the pyrophosphoralysis of dUTP into dUMP and inorganic pyrophosphate. This function contributes to DNA replication and repair via de novo thymidylate biosynthesis, as the dUMP product is methylated by thymidylate synthase (TS) to form dTMP, which is then phosphorylated to dTTP. DUT is also crucial for maintaining genome integrity by reducing cellular dUTP levels, thereby preventing the repeated cycles of uracil misincorporation into DNA and DNA repair-mediated strand breaks that would lead to cell death.

In addition to their different localizations, the two DUT isoforms display different expression patterns: while DUT-M is constitutively expressed, DUT-N is under cell cycle control and notably upregulated during S phase. These expression patterns correspond with their roles in the DNA replication cycle of their respective genomes, and thus indicate different regulatory mechanisms affecting each isoform.

=== Mechanism ===
The dUTP hydrolysis cycle can be outlined in the following four enzymatic steps: (i) fast substrate binding, (ii) isomerization of the enzyme-substrate complex into the catalytically competent conformation, (iii) hydrolysis of the substrate, and (iv) rapid, non-ordered release of the products.

== Clinical significance ==
Since many chemotherapeutic agents such as 5-fluorouracil treat neoplastic diseases, including head and neck cancer, breast cancer, and gastrointestinal cancer, by targeting TS in thymidylate metabolism, DUT may protect against the cytotoxic side effects by countering dUTP accumulation. At the same time, high levels of DUT-N have been associated with chemoresistance and faster tumor progression, and thus, could also serve as a prognostic marker for overall survival and response to chemotherapy. Similarly, DUT is significantly overexpressed in hepatocellular carcinoma and may serve as a prognostic marker for the cancer. Notably, DUT expression is regulated by the tumor suppressor gene p53 in order to promote apoptosis of tumor cells.<pmid19015155/> Abnormal DUT expression and localization has been speculated to promote cancer transformation.

== Interactions ==
DUT interacts with dUTP to catalyze its hydrolysis into dUMP and pyrophosphate. E2F and Sp1 enhance DUT expression by binding its promoter, while p53 inhibits DUT transcription by binding its promoter. A putative NF-κB binding site was also identified in the DUT promoter.
