= Glucose-1-phosphate thymidylyltransferase =

Class of enzymes

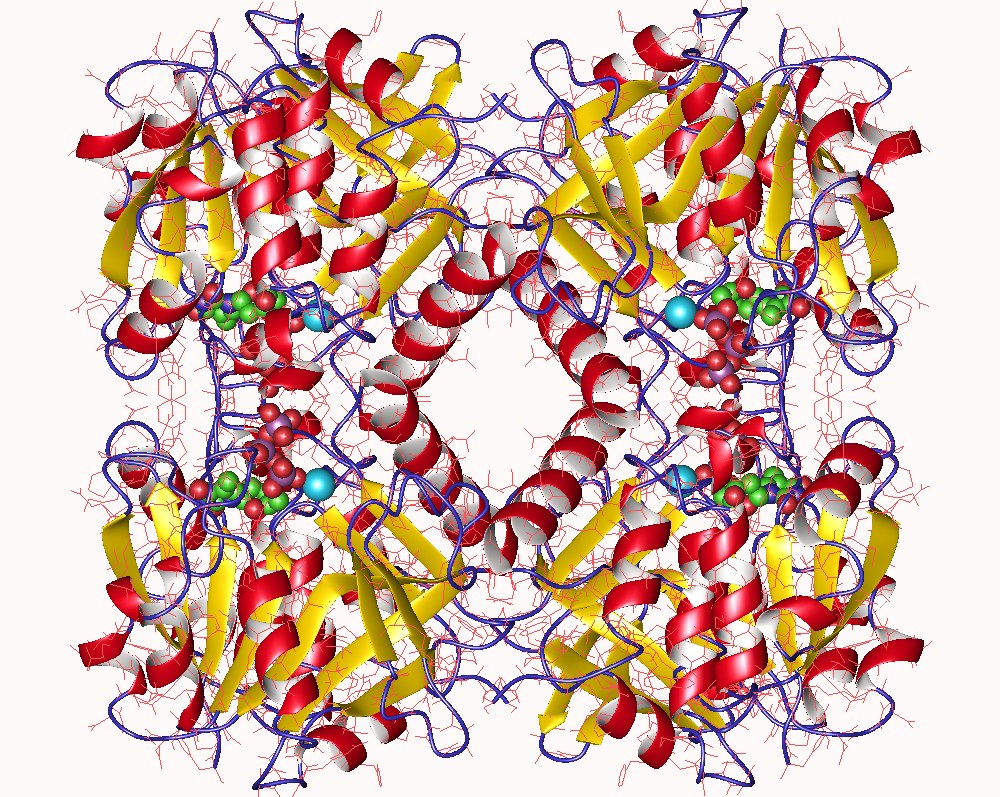
- glucose-1-phosphate thymidylyltransferase tetramer, E.Coli

Identifiers
- EC no.: 2.7.7.24
- CAS no.: 9026-03-3

Databases
- IntEnz: IntEnz view
- BRENDA: BRENDA entry
- ExPASy: NiceZyme view
- KEGG: KEGG entry
- MetaCyc: metabolic pathway
- PRIAM: profile
- PDB structures: RCSB PDB PDBe PDBsum
- Gene Ontology: AmiGO / QuickGO
Search
- PMC: articles
- PubMed: articles
- NCBI: proteins

Glucose-1-phosphate thymidylyltransferase (EC 2.7.7.24) is an enzyme that catalyzes the chemical reaction

thymidine triphosphate
+
glucose 1-phosphate
PP_{i}
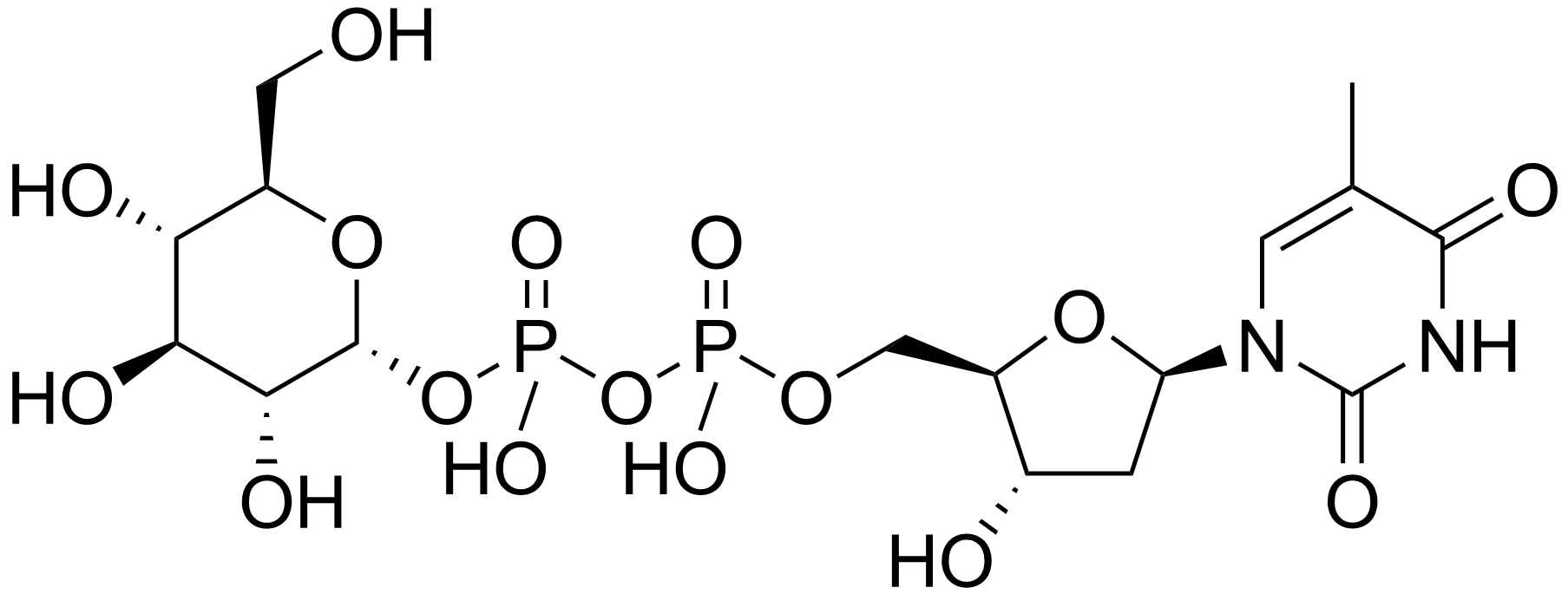
thymidine diphosphate glucose

The enzyme characterised from Pseudomonas aeruginosa and Streptococcus faecalis combines thymidine triphosphate and glucose 1-phosphate to give thymidine diphosphate glucose, with pyrophosphate (PP_{i}) as a byproduct. The mechanism of the reaction has been studied in Escherichia coli, where it is part of the biosynthetic pathway to L-rhamnose.

== Nomenclature ==
This enzyme is a transferase, specifically one transferring phosphorus-containing nucleotide groups (nucleotidyltransferases). The systematic name of this enzyme class is dTTP:alpha-D-glucose-1-phosphate thymidylyltransferase. Other names in common use include:

- glucose 1-phosphate thymidylyltransferase,
- dTDP-glucose synthase, dTDP-glucose pyrophosphorylase,
- thymidine diphosphoglucose pyrophosphorylase,
- thymidine diphosphate glucose pyrophosphorylase, and
- TDP-glucose pyrophosphorylase.

== Structural studies ==
As of late 2007, 19 structures have been solved for this class of enzymes, with PDB accession codes PDB: 1FXO, PDB: 1FZW, PDB: 1G0R, PDB: 1G1L, PDB: 1G23, PDB: 1G2V, PDB: 1G3L, PDB: 1H5R, PDB: 1H5S, PDB: 1H5T, PDB: 1IIM, PDB: 1IIN, PDB: 1LVW, PDB: 1MC3, PDB: 1MP3, PDB: 1MP4, PDB: 1MP5, PDB: 2GGO, and PDB: 2GGQ.
