= DnaH =

DNA polymerase III, subunits beta and tau

Identifiers
- Symbol: dnaH
- NCBI gene: 1115872
- UniProt: Q9CDM5

Other data
- EC number: 2.7.7.7
Search for
- Structures: Swiss-model
- Domains: InterPro

dnaH is a gene involved in DNA replication.
