= Thymidine diphosphate =

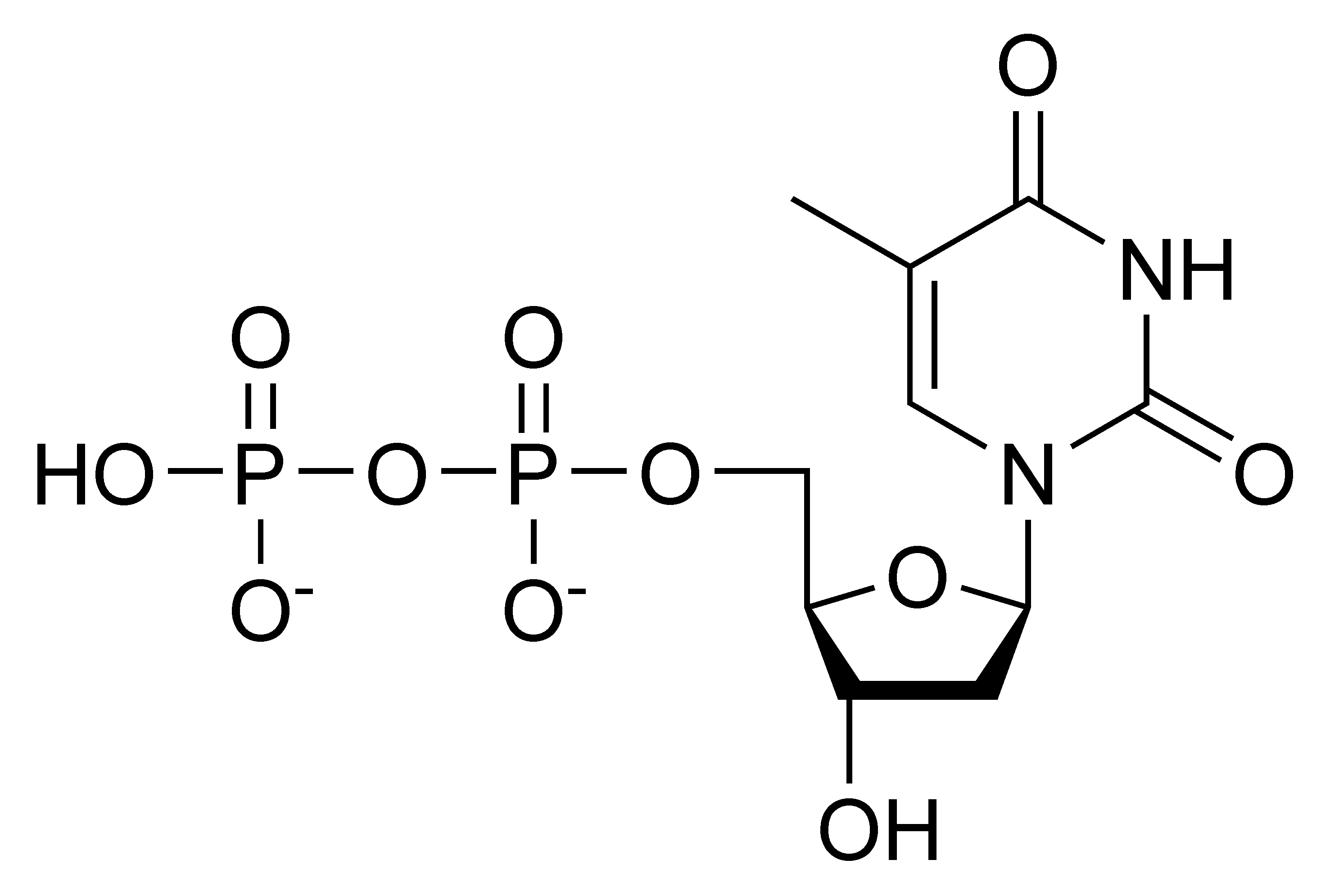

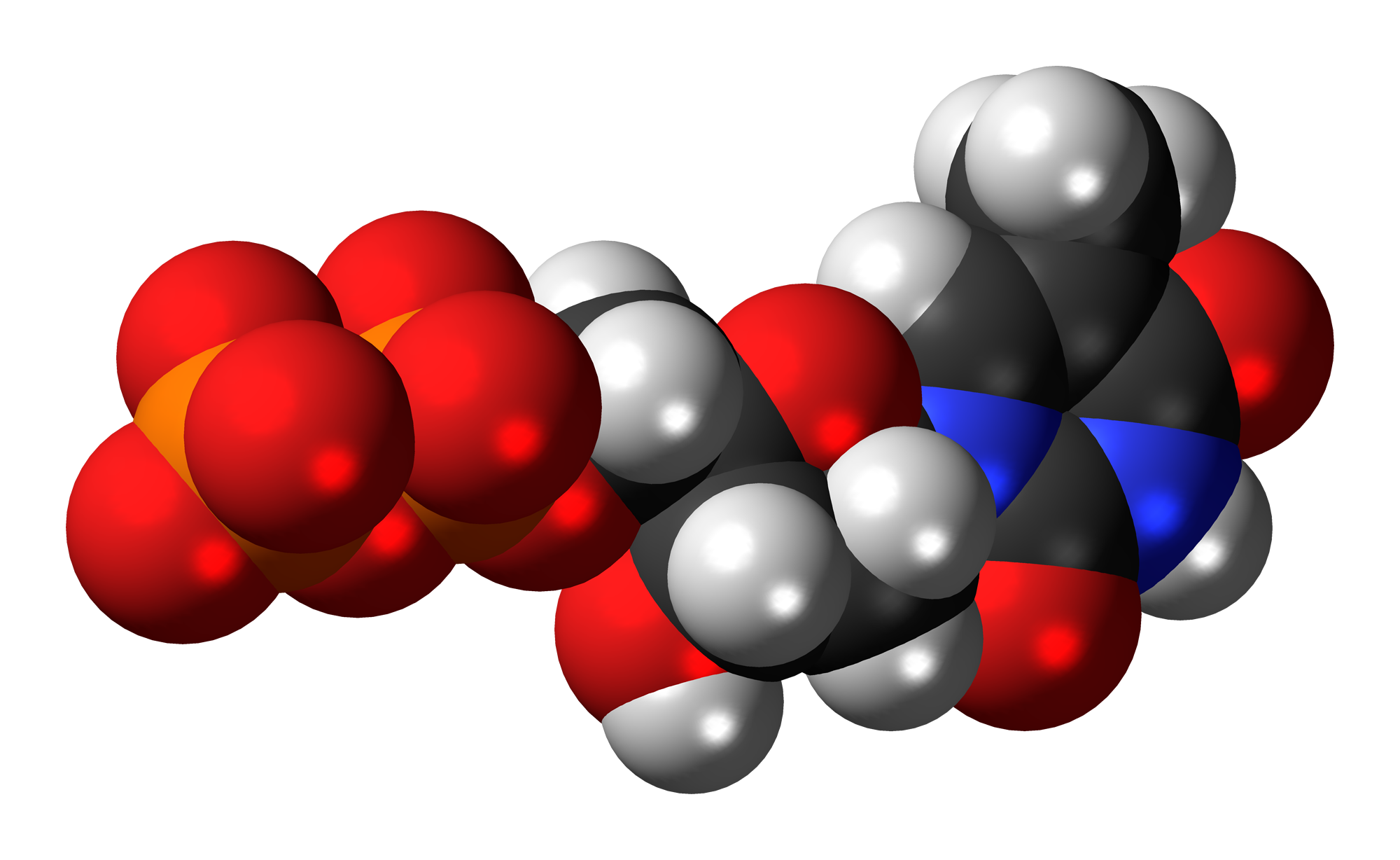

Names
- IUPAC name Thymidine 5′-(trihydrogen diphosphate)
- Systematic IUPAC name [(2R,3S,5R)-3-Hydroxy-5-(5-methyl-2,4-dioxo-3,4-dihydropyrimidin-1(2H)-yl)oxolan-2-yl]methyl trihydrogen diphosphate

Identifiers
CAS Number	491-97-4
3D model (JSmol)	Interactive image
ChEBI	CHEBI:18075
ChemSpider	144320
PubChem CID	164628
UNII	QQ3K1P45DF
CompTox Dashboard (EPA)	DTXSID801027011
- InChI: InChI=1S/C10H16N2O11P2/c1-5-3-12(10(15)11-9(5)14)8-2-6(13)7(22-8)4-21-25(19,20)23-24(16,17)18/h3,6-8,13H,2,4H2,1H3,(H,19,20)(H,11,14,15)(H2,16,17,18)/t6-,7+,8+/m0/s1 Key: UJLXYODCHAELLY-XLPZGREQSA-N
- SMILES: CC1=CN(C(=O)NC1=O)[C@H]2C[C@@H]([C@H](O2)COP(=O)(O)OP(=O)(O)O)O

Properties
Chemical formula	C_{10}H_{16}N_{2}O_{11}P_{2}
Molar mass	402.19
- Except where otherwise noted, data are given for materials in their standard state (at 25 °C [77 °F], 100 kPa). verify (what is ?) Infobox references

Thymidine diphosphate (TDP) or deoxythymidine diphosphate (dTDP) (also thymidine pyrophosphate, dTPP) is a nucleotide diphosphate. It is an ester of pyrophosphoric acid with the nucleoside thymidine. dTDP consists of the pyrophosphate group, the pentose sugar ribose, and the nucleobase thymine. Unlike the other deoxyribonucleotides, thymidine diphosphate does not always contain the "deoxy" prefix in its name.

== Structure and properties ==
Thymidine diphosphate contains a β-D-2′-deoxyribofuranose ring linked to a thymine pyrimidine base via a β-N1-glycosidic bond, including a diphosphate chain attached to the 5’-position of the sugar. In aqueous solution, the pyrophosphate group is extensively ionized at physiological pH and is capable of coordinating with divalent metal ions such as Mg^2+, which is necessary for many nucleotide-processing enzymes. Through analysis of crystal structures of enzymes bound to TDP or to the antiviral analogue azido-thymidine phosphate show that a conserved set of lysine, histidine, and arginine residues allows for the nucleotide to be correctly positioned in the active site.

== Biosynthesis and metabolism ==
=== Intermediate in dTTP synthesis ===
In most organisms, thymidine diphosphate is a following intermediate in forming thymidine triphosphate (dTTP), a substrate precursor for DNA synthesis. Early research conducted on tumor extracts concluded that ATP dependent kinases were responsible for the phosphorylation of thymidine monophosphate (dTMP); first to thymidine diphosphate then to dTTP. dTDP was observed to have low accumulation due to its rapid conversion to dTTP, establishing the diphosphate variant to be an immediate precursor to dTTP in mammalian cells.

Thymidine diphosphate is also found within the salvage pathway, where thymidine is phosphorylated by thymidine kinase to dTMP, which is then further phosphorylated by nucleotide diphosphate kinases. Analysis of thymidine kinases have used bisubstrate analogues containing TDP to induce conformational changes associated with phosphate transfer.

== Role in thymidine nucleotide homeostasis and telomere biology ==
A balanced pool of thymidine mono-, di-, and triphosphates are crucial for accurate DNA replication and repair. Thymidine nucleotide is found to be involved in various metabolic pathways through use of genome-wide functional screening of human cells. Enzymes such as thymidine kinase 1 (TK1), thymidylate synthase (TYMS), and triphosphohydrolase SAMHD1, help to regulate telomere length and are regulated by TDP. Disturbances that reduce dTDP and dTTP production results in telomere shortening, whereas the loss of SAMHD1 leads to telomere elongation. Thymidine supplementation or manipulating enzymes that regulate dTDP/dTTP levels can restore telomere length in cases of telomere biology disorders, highlighting the importance of thymidine nucleotide metabolism in human telomere regulation.

== Role in bacterial sugar-nucleotide biosynthesis ==
In widespread species of bacteria, thymidine diphosphate is a component of a larger activated sugar donor such as dTDP-rhammose. dTDP-rhammose in particular is generated via glucose-1-phosphate utilizing dTTP throughout a conserved four enzyme pathway. These four enzymes include RmlA-D; RmlA (glucose-1-phosphate thymidyltransferase) forms dTDP-D-glucose, which then gets converted into a dTDP-6-deoxy-D-xylo-4-hexulose intermediate via RmlB (4-6-dehydratase). This intermediate then gets converted to dTDP-L-Rhammose via RmlC (3,5- epimerase) and RmlD (4-reductase) enzymes.

dTDP-L-rhammose is a crucial precursor to polysaccharide structures containing rhammose seen in cell walls and surface structures in various Gram-positive and Gram-negative pathogens such as streptococci and Mycobacterium tuberculosis. Disruption in Rml enzyme regulation impacts cell wall integrity and virulence, highlighting the importance of dTDP-linked sugars in bacterial physiology.

== Structural biology and enzyme interactions ==
Thymidine diphosphate is a commonly used substrate in experiments studying nucleotide processing enzymes. Obtained crystal structures of nucleoside diphosphate kinase (NDPK) with TDP or azido-thymine diphosphate reveal how the nucleotide binds to the active site, and how the diphosphate group is transferred to other nucleoside diphosphates. Utilizing azido-thymidine diphosphate revealed the 3’-azido substituent displaces a catalytically crucial lysine and disrupts hydrogen bonding between the B- and y-phosphate group’s oxygen, explaining how the proviral drug AZT is a poor substrate to convert into its triphosphate form via NDPK. These studies have provided understanding how kinases recognize thymidine versus thymidylate variants and how mono, di, and triphosphate forms are all distinguished from one another.

== Pharmacological and biomedical relevance ==
Due to thymidine phosphates' relevance in the salvage pathway, nucleotide synthesis, and metabolic sugar-nucleotide pathways, enzymes that produce or consume TDP are considered potential drug targets. In human cells, alteration of thymidine nucleotide metabolism can influence telomere elongation, suggesting that the possibility of exploiting pathways involving dTDP and dTTP could be useful in treating telomere biology disorders and cancer, where telomere length is unregulated.

In bacteria, the dTDP-L-rhammose pathway is essential for viability in several pathogens. Assays conducted that monitor the conversion from dTDP-glucose to dTDP-L-rhammose via NADPH consumption have been used to identify possible inhibitors to Rml enzymes. Some of these compounds have been shown to inhibit M. tuberculosis from widespread growth in culture, showcasing the feasibility of targeting TDP-sugar biosynthesis for antibiotic development. Azido-thymidine diphosphate's weak ability to convert into its triphosphate form have also provided input in designing nucleoside analogues with improved activation profiles.

== See also ==
- Nucleoside
- Nucleotide
- DNA
- RNA
- Oligonucleotide
- dTDP-glucose
