= Deoxycytidine triphosphate =

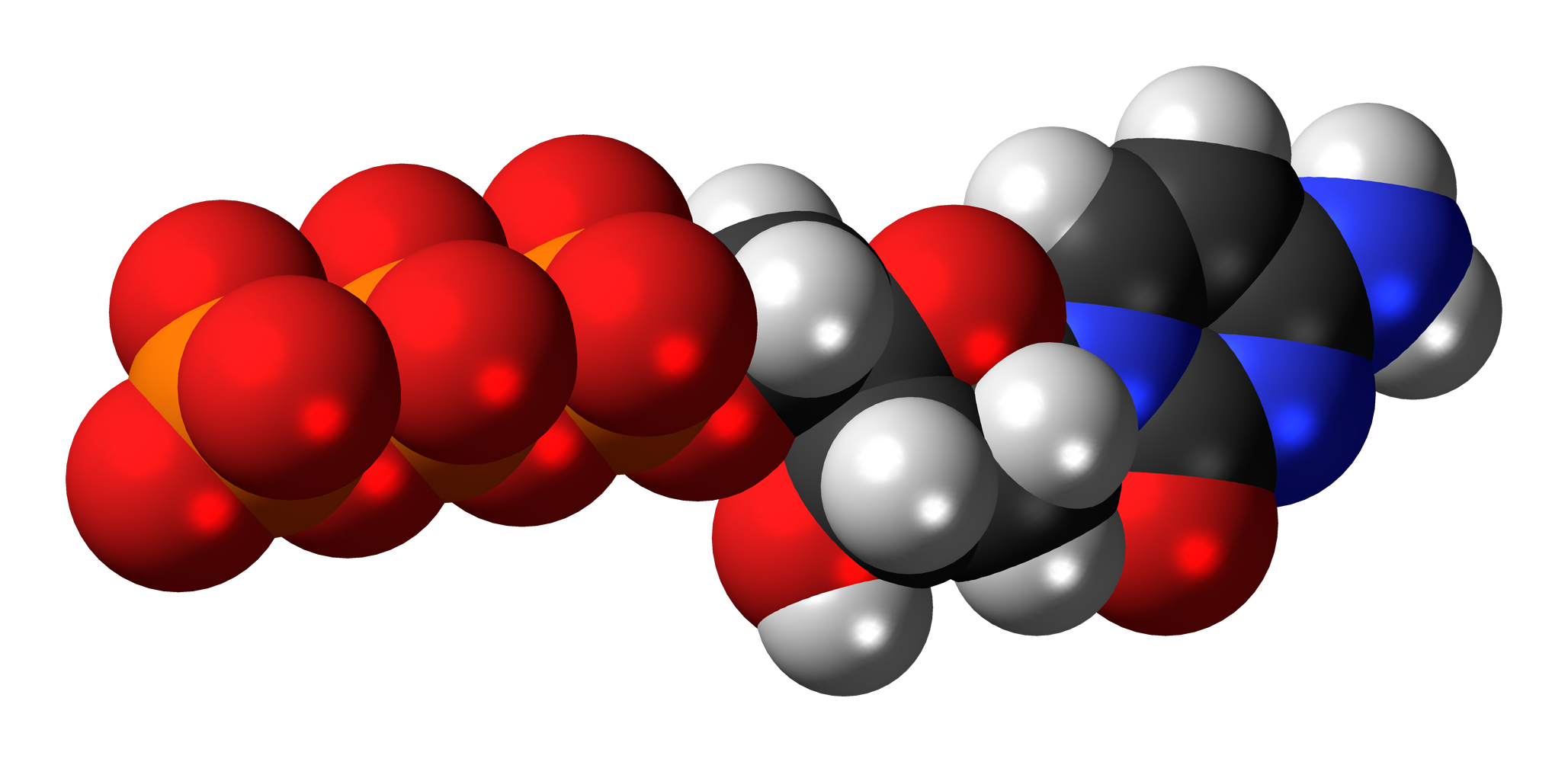

Names
- IUPAC name 2′-Deoxycytidine 5′-(tetrahydrogen triphosphate)
- Systematic IUPAC name O^{1}-{[(2R,3S,5R)-5-(4-Amino-2-oxopyrimidin-1(2H)-yl)-3-hydroxyoxolan-2-yl]methyl} tetrahydrogen triphosphate

Identifiers
CAS Number	2056-98-6
3D model (JSmol)	Interactive image
ChEBI	CHEBI:16311
ChemSpider	58601
ECHA InfoCard	100.016.504
PubChem CID	65091
CompTox Dashboard (EPA)	DTXSID60942755 DTXSID50908042, DTXSID60942755
- InChI: InChI=1S/C9H16N3O13P3/c10-7-1-2-12(9(14)11-7)8-3-5(13)6(23-8)4-22-27(18,19)25-28(20,21)24-26(15,16)17/h1-2,5-6,8,13H,3-4H2,(H,18,19)(H,20,21)(H2,10,11,14)(H2,15,16,17)/t5-,6+,8+/m0/s1 Key: RGWHQCVHVJXOKC-SHYZEUOFSA-N; InChI=1/C9H16N3O13P3/c10-7-1-2-12(9(14)11-7)8-3-5(13)6(23-8)4-22-27(18,19)25-28(20,21)24-26(15,16)17/h1-2,5-6,8,13H,3-4H2,(H,18,19)(H,20,21)(H2,10,11,14)(H2,15,16,17)/t5-,6+,8+/m0/s1 Key: RGWHQCVHVJXOKC-SHYZEUOFBW
- SMILES: C1[C@@H]([C@H](O[C@H]1N2C=CC(=NC2=O)N)CO[P@@](=O)(O)O[P@@](=O)(O)OP(=O)(O)O)O

Properties
Chemical formula	C_{9}H_{16}N_{3}O_{13}P_{3}
Molar mass	467.156 g·mol^{−1}
- Except where otherwise noted, data are given for materials in their standard state (at 25 °C [77 °F], 100 kPa). verify (what is ?) Infobox references

Deoxycytidine triphosphate (dCTP) is a nucleoside triphosphate that contains the pyrimidine base cytosine. The triphosphate group contains high-energy phosphoanhydride bonds, which liberate energy when hydrolized.

DNA polymerase enzymes use this energy to incorporate deoxycytidine into a newly synthesized strand of DNA. A chemical equation can be written that represents the process:

(DNA)_{n} + dCTP ↔ (DNA)_{n}-C + PP_{i}

That is, dCTP has the PP_{i} (pyrophosphate) cleaved off and the dCMP is incorporated into the DNA strand at the 3' end. Subsequent hydrolysis of the PP_{i} drives the equilibrium of the reaction toward the right side, i.e. incorporation of the nucleotide in the growing DNA chain.

Like other nucleoside triphosphates, manufacturers recommend that dCTP be stored in aqueous solution at −20 °C.

== See also ==
- DNA replication
