= Thymidine triphosphate =

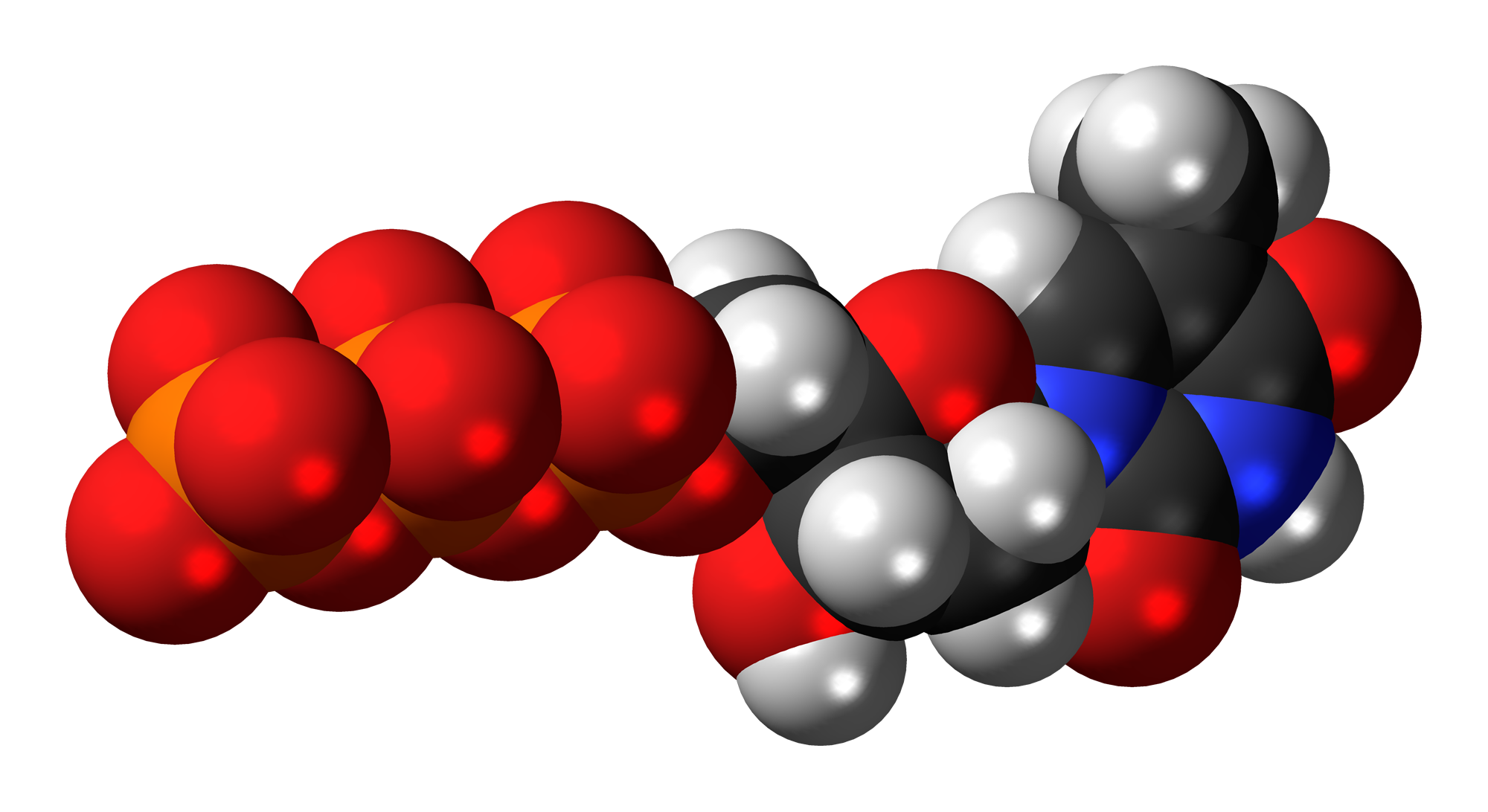

Names
- IUPAC name Thymidine 5′-(tetrahydrogen triphosphate)
- Systematic IUPAC name O^{1}-{[(2R,3S,5R)-5-(2,4-Dioxo-5-methyl-3,4-dihydropyrimidin-1(2H)-yl)-3-hydroxyoxolan-2-yl]methyl} tetrahydrogen triphosphate
- Other names dTTP, 2′-Deoxythymidine triphosphate

Identifiers
CAS Number	365-08-2
3D model (JSmol)	Interactive image
ChEBI	CHEBI:18077
ChEMBL	ChEMBL363559
ChemSpider	58493 =
DrugBank	DB02452
ECHA InfoCard	100.006.064
EC Number	206-669-7
IUPHAR/BPS	5505
KEGG	C00459
MeSH	thymidine+5'-triphosphate
PubChem CID	64968
UNII	QOP4K539MU
CompTox Dashboard (EPA)	DTXSID30189998
- InChI: InChI=1S/C10H17N2O14P3/c1-5-3-12(10(15)11-9(5)14)8-2-6(13)7(24-8)4-23-28(19,20)26-29(21,22)25-27(16,17)18/h3,6-8,13H,2,4H2,1H3,(H,19,20)(H,21,22)(H,11,14,15)(H2,16,17,18)/t6-,7+,8+/m0/s1 Key: NHVNXKFIZYSCEB-XLPZGREQSA-N
- SMILES: CC1=CN(C(=O)NC1=O)C2CC(C(O2)COP(=O)(O)OP(=O)(O)OP(=O)(O)O)O

Properties
Chemical formula	C_{10}H_{17}N_{2}O_{14}P_{3}
Molar mass	482.168
- Except where otherwise noted, data are given for materials in their standard state (at 25 °C [77 °F], 100 kPa). (what is ?) Infobox references

Thymidine triphosphate (TTP), also called deoxythymidine triphosphate (dTTP), is one of the four nucleoside triphosphates that are used in the in vivo synthesis of DNA. Unlike the other deoxyribonucleoside triphosphates, thymidine triphosphate does not always contain the "deoxy" prefix in its name. This is because dTTP does not have a corresponding ribonucleoside triphosphate, as the uridine triphosphate, which lacks thymidine's 5-methylation, is used instead.

dTTP is synthesized via the methylation of dUMP via thymidylate synthase.

It can be used by DNA ligase to create overlapping "sticky ends" so that protruding ends of opened microbial plasmids may be closed up.
