= Deoxyuridine monophosphate =

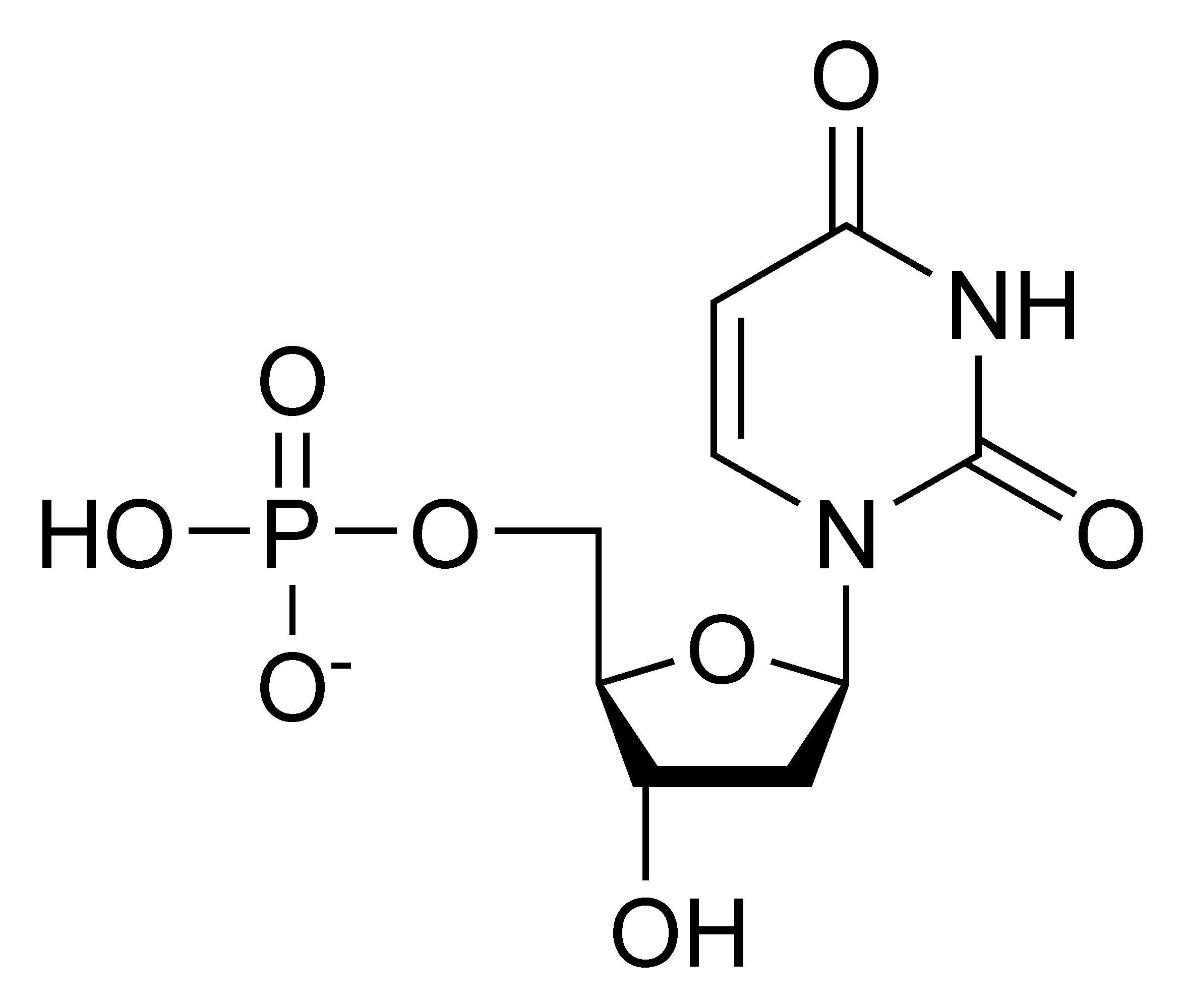

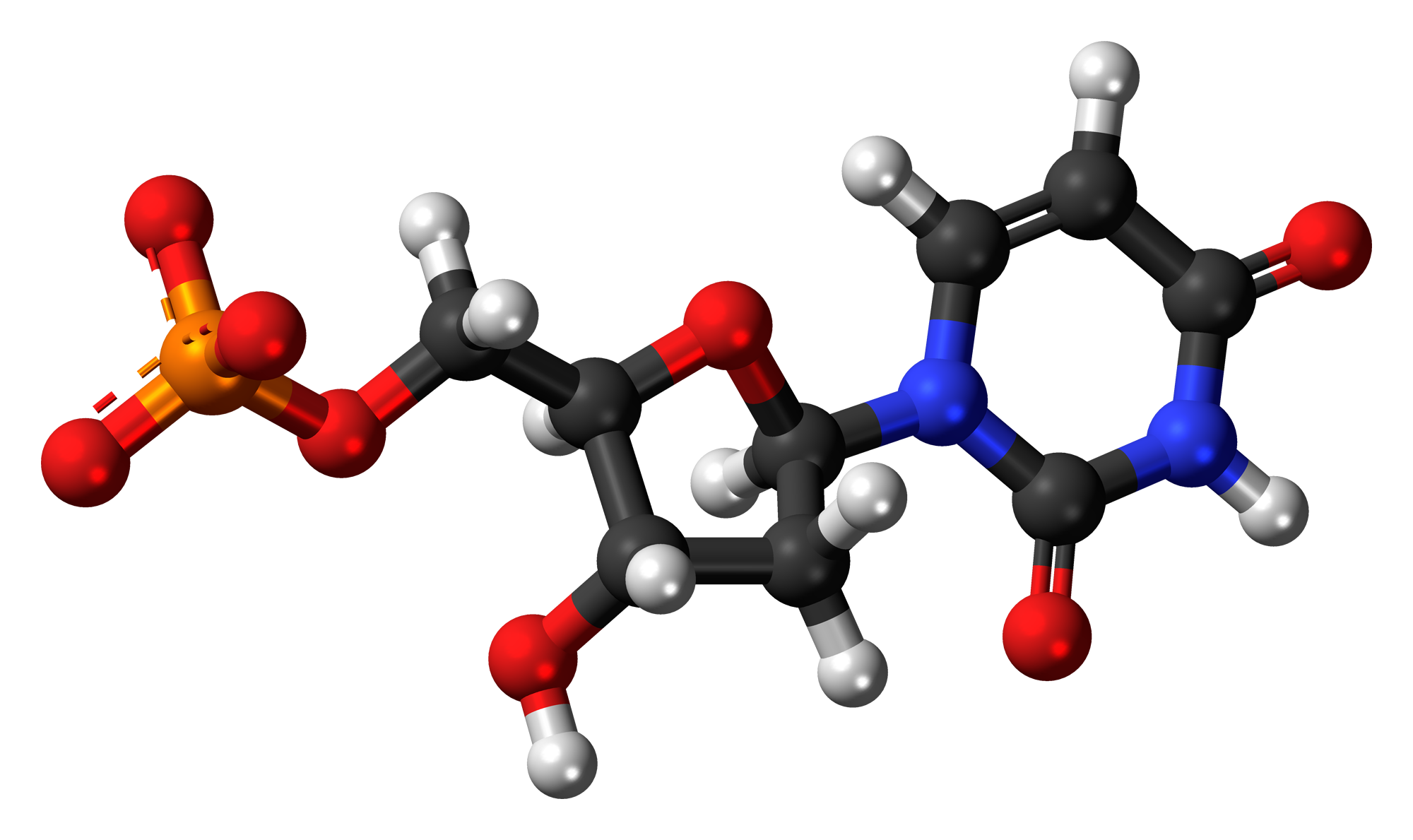

Names
- IUPAC name 2′-Deoxyuridylic acid
- Systematic IUPAC name [(2R,3S,5R)-5-(2,4-Dioxo-3,4-dihydropyrimidin-1(2H)-yl)-3-hydroxyoxolan-2-yl]methyl dihydrogen phosphate
- Other names dUMP

Identifiers
CAS Number	964-26-1
3D model (JSmol)	Interactive image
ChEMBL	ChEMBL211312
ChemSpider	58574
ECHA InfoCard	100.012.290
MeSH	uridine-4'-monophosphate
PubChem CID	688
UNII	N9J10KFG94
CompTox Dashboard (EPA)	DTXSID20242223
- InChI: InChI=1S/C9H13N2O8P/c12-5-3-8(11-2-1-7(13)10-9(11)14)19-6(5)4-18-20(15,16)17/h1-2,5-6,8,12H,3-4H2,(H,10,13,14)(H2,15,16,17)/t5-,6+,8+/m0/s1 Key: JSRLJPSBLDHEIO-SHYZEUOFSA-N; InChI=1/C9H13N2O8P/c12-5-3-8(11-2-1-7(13)10-9(11)14)19-6(5)4-18-20(15,16)17/h1-2,5-6,8,12H,3-4H2,(H,10,13,14)(H2,15,16,17)/t5-,6+,8+/m0/s1 Key: JSRLJPSBLDHEIO-SHYZEUOFBW
- SMILES: O=P(O)(O)OC[C@H]2O[C@@H](N\1C(=O)NC(=O)/C=C/1)C[C@@H]2O

Properties
Chemical formula	C_{9}H_{13}N_{2}O_{8}P
Molar mass	308.182
- Except where otherwise noted, data are given for materials in their standard state (at 25 °C [77 °F], 100 kPa). verify (what is ?) Infobox references

Deoxyuridine monophosphate (dUMP), also known as deoxyuridylic acid or deoxyuridylate in its conjugate acid and conjugate base forms, respectively, is a deoxynucleotide.

It is an intermediate in the metabolism of deoxyribonucleotides.

== Biosynthesis ==
Deoxyuridine monophosphate (dUMP) is the deoxygenated form of uridine monophosphate (UMP), and is the precursor to deoxythymidine monophosphate (dTMP), a component of DNA nucleotide biosynthesis. By replacing the hydroxyl group at the 2' carbon of ribose with a hydrogen, UMP becomes deoxygenated to dUMP.

The synthesis of deoxyuridine monophosphate (dUMP) is a multi-step process that begins with uridine monophosphate (UMP), the product of pyrimidine biosynthesis. The enzyme nucleoside monophosphate kinase converts UMP and ATP to uridine diphosphate (UDP) and ADP.

In the presence of excess ATP, the enzyme ribonucleotide reductase initiates a chain reaction with UDP, which catalyzes the formation of deoxyuridine diphosphate (dUDP), which is then converted to deoxyuridine triphosphate (dUTP), then deoxyuridine monophosphate (dUMP) via the addition or removal of phosphate groups.

== Interactive pathway map ==
Click on genes, proteins and metabolites below to link to respective articles. (Note: The interactive pathway map can be edited at WikiPathways: "FluoropyrimidineActivity_WP1601".)

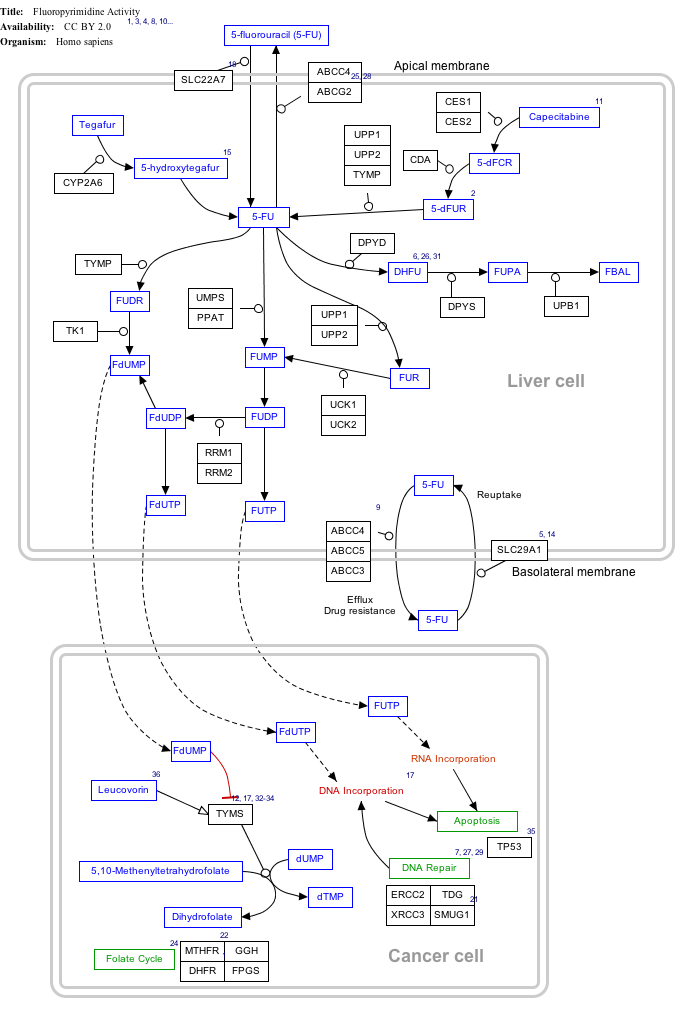

Fluorouracil (5-FU) Activity edit

== See also ==
- DCMP deaminase
- Uridine monophosphate
