= Quorum-quenching N-acyl-homoserine lactonase =

Class of enzymes

quorum-quenching N-acyl-homoserine lactonase

Identifiers
- EC no.: 3.1.1.81
- CAS no.: 389867-43-0
- Alt. names: acyl homoserine degrading enzyme, acyl-homoserine lactone acylase, AHL lactonase, AHL-degrading enzyme, AHL-inactivating enzyme, AHLase, AhlD, AhlK, AiiA, AiiA lactonase, AiiA-like protein, AiiB, AiiC, AttM, delactonase, lactonase-like enzyme, N-acyl homoserine lactonase, N-acyl homoserine lactone hydrolase, N-acyl-homoserine lactone lactonase, N-acyl-L-homoserine lactone hydrolase, quorum-quenching lactonase, quorum-quenching N-acyl homoserine lactone hydrolase

Databases
- BRENDA: enzyme data
- ExPASy: NiceZyme view
- KEGG: enzyme entry
- MetaCyc: metabolic pathway
- Rhea: reactions
- PDB structures: RCSB PDB PDBe PDBsum
Search
- PMC: articles
- PubMed: articles
- NCBI: proteins

General chemical structure of an N-acyl homoserine lactone

The quorum-quenching N-acyl-homoserine lactonase (EC 3.1.1.81, acyl-homoserine lactonase; systematic name N-acyl-L-homoserine-lactone lactonohydrolase), sometimes vaguely called lactonase, is an enzyme which targets and inactivates acylated homoserine lactones (AHLs). It catalyzes the reaction

an N-acyl-L-homoserine lactone + H_{2}O $\rightleftharpoons$ an N-acyl-L-homoserine

Many species of α-, β-, and γ-proteobacteria produce acylated homoserine lactones, small hormone-like molecules commonly used as communication signals between bacterial cells in a population to regulate certain gene expression and phenotypic behaviours. This type of gene regulation is known as quorum sensing.

As with other Enzyme Commission numbers, this entry applies to any enzyme with this chemical function, regardless of their evolutionary origin. There are a few different approaches to achiving this catalytic activity:

- In certain species of bacteria, an metalloenzyme performs this function. An example would be aiiA of Bacillus thuringiensis (entry), an enzyme similar to the metallo-beta-lactamase. A bacterium may use this enzyme to control its own quorum-sensing system.
- In animals, the paraoxonases perform this function. A host organism expressing such an enzyme would have better control ofd bacterial infections than otherwise.

== Enzyme structure ==
=== Metallo-type ===
A dinuclear zinc binding site is conserved in all known metallo-lactonases and essential for enzyme activity and protein folding.

Zn1 is tetracoordinated by His104, His106, His169, and the bridging hydroxide ion. Zn2 has five ligands, including Asp191, His235, His109, Asp108, and the bridging hydroxide ion. The metal ions assist in polarizing the lactone bond, increasing the electrophilicity of the lactone ring’s carbonyl carbon. Isotopic labeling studies indicated that the ring opening occurs via an addition elimination reaction with water addition shown below.

=== Paraoxonase-type ===
The paraoxonases are six-bladed beta-propeller proteins.

== Biological Function ==
Lactonase hydrolyzes the ester bond of the homoserine lactone ring of acylated homoserine lactones. In hydrolysing the lactone bond, lactonase prevents these signaling molecules from binding to their target transcriptional regulators, thus inhibiting quorum sensing.

Lactonases are able to interfere with AHL-mediated quorum sensing. Some examples of these lactonases are AiiA produced by Bacillus species, AttM and AiiB produced by Agrobacterium tumefaciens, and QIcA produced by Hyphomicrobiales species.

=== Bacterial ===
Lactonases have been reported for Bacillus, Agrobacterium, Rhodococcus, Streptomyces, Arthrobacter, Pseudomonas, and Klebsiella. The Bacillus cereus group (consisting of B. cereus, B. thuringiensis, B. mycoides, and B. anthracis) was found to contain nine genes homologous to the AiiA gene that encode AHL-inactivating enzymes, with the catalytic zinc-binding motif conserved in all cases.

In the phytopathogen A. tumefaciens, AiiB lactonase acts as a fine modulator that essentially delays the release of lactone OC8-HSL and the resultant number of tumors produced by the pathogen. AttM lactonase mediates the degradation of the lactone OC8-HSL in wounded plant tissues.

=== Animal ===
The primary activity of the anti-atherosclerotic paraoxonase (PON) enzymes is as lactonase. Oxidized polyunsaturated fatty acids (notably in oxidized low-density lipoprotein) form lactone-like structures that are PON substrates.

== Ecology ==
It is still unclear the ecological effects of lactonase but it has been proposed that since bacteria mostly coexist with other microorganisms in the environment, some bacteria strains could have evolved its feeding strategies and utilize AHLs as their main resource for energy and nitrogen.

== Applications ==
Understanding the mechanisms and purposes of lactonase activity could lead to potential applied roles for these lactonases to control bacterial infections by inhibiting quorum-sensing activity and bring about profound effects on human health and the environment. However, in both the chemical and enzymatic lactonolysis, the reaction is reversible, complicating direct therapeutic application of lactonases.

Pseudomonas aeruginosa, is an AHL-producing bacteria an opportunistic pathogen that infects immuno-compromised patients, and is found in lung infections of cystic fibrosis patients. P. aeruginosa relies on quorum sensing via production of lactones N-butanoyl-L-homoserine (C4-HSL) and N-(3-oxododecanoyl)-l-HSL (3-oxo-C12-HSL) to regulate swarming, toxin and protease production, and proper biofilm formation. The absence of one or more components of the quorum-sensing system results in a significant reduction in virulence of the pathogen.

Erwinia carotovora is a plant pathogen that causes soft rot in a number of crops such as potatoes and carrots by using N-hexanoyl-l-HSL (C6-HSL) quorum sensing to evade the plant's defense systems and coordinate its production of pectate lyase during the infection process.

Plants expressing AHL-Lactonase were shown to demonstrate enhanced resistance to infection from the pathogen Erwinia carotovora. Expression of virulence genes in E. Carotovora is regulated by N-(3-oxohexanoyl)-L-homoserine lactone (OHHL). Presumably, OHHL-hydrolysis via lactonase reduced OHHL levels, inhibiting the quorum-sensing systems driving virulence gene expression.

== See also ==
- 1,4-lactonase
- 2-pyrone-4,6-dicarboxylate lactonase
- 3-oxoadipate enol-lactonase
- Actinomycin lactonase
- Deoxylimonate A-ring-lactonase
- Gluconolactonase
- L-rhamnono-1,4-lactonase
- Limonin-D-ring-lactonase
- Steroid-lactonase
- Triacetate-lactonase
- Xylono-1,4-lactonase
