= Paraoxonase =

Gene family

paraoxonase 1
- A 360 degree view of Serum Paraoxonase-1 (1v04)

Identifiers
- Symbol: PON1
- Alt. symbols: PON
- NCBI gene: 5444
- HGNC: 9204
- OMIM: 168820
- RefSeq: NM_000446
- UniProt: P27169

Other data
- Locus: Chr. 7 q21.3
Search for
- Structures: Swiss-model
- Domains: InterPro

paraoxonase 2

Identifiers
- Symbol: PON2
- NCBI gene: 5445
- HGNC: 9205
- OMIM: 602447
- RefSeq: NM_000305
- UniProt: Q15165

Other data
- Locus: Chr. 7 q21.3
Search for
- Structures: Swiss-model
- Domains: InterPro

paraoxonase 3

Identifiers
- Symbol: PON3
- NCBI gene: 5446
- HGNC: 9206
- OMIM: 602720
- RefSeq: NM_000940
- UniProt: Q15166

Other data
- Locus: Chr. 7 q21.3
Search for
- Structures: Swiss-model
- Domains: InterPro

Paraoxonases (PON) are a family of mammalian enzymes sharing a six-bladed beta-propeller structure. There were originally discovered for their aryldialkylphosphatase (EC 3.1.8.1) activity in the hydrolysis of organophosphates such as paraoxon. There are three paraoxonase isozymes in humans. Two of these are capable of the paraoxon-hydrolysis activity; three are capable of a arylesterase (EC 3.1.1.2) activity and at least one is capable of a similar DFPase (EC 3.8.2.2) activity.

Research has indicated the enzymatic activity of paraoxonases is more diversified than its activity as an organophosphatase. Esterase and lactonase activity has also been observed from these enzymes and although the physiologically relevant substrates for these enzymes are unknown, it is likely that lactones are the main substrate (although there is a relatively high level of variation in substrate specificity among these enzymes). Most of the studies on the paraoxonase family have specifically looked at the PON1 type, leaving much to be learned about the remaining two.

The study of this enzyme family has many potential consequences in preventative medicine and toxicology as well as in certain societal contexts. The genes that encode for these enzymes have a number of different polymorphisms, which created additional interest in the study of this enzyme group and its potential ethnic variations. Additional research on the inhibition and selective inhibition, specifically of PON1, has been done to shed some light on the connections between decreases in enzymatic activity of individuals with cardiovascular diseases. Evidence also suggests that this family of enzymes has some role in our innate immune system.

== Types ==
There are three known paraoxonases, which are encoded by the genes PON1, PON2 and PON3, located on the long arm of chromosome 7 in humans. The differences between them lie in their locations and activities.

- PON1 has gene expression primarily in the liver but has also been expressed in tissue from the kidney and parts of the colon. PON1 that is synthesized in the liver is then transported into the bloodstream, where it will associate with high-density lipoprotein (HDL). It has been shown to have broad substrate specificity and has proved to protect against exposure to some organophosphates (such as those from insecticides) by hydrolyzing potentially toxic metabolites. PON1 also plays an important role as an antioxidant in preventing the oxidation of low-density lipoproteins (LDL), a process that is directly involved in the development of atherosclerosis. Its serum concentration is influenced by inflammatory changes and the levels of serum oxidised-LDL.
- PON2 is a ubiquitously expressed intracellular protein that can protect cells against oxidative damage. While PON2 shares similar antioxidant properties with its two enzyme counterparts, it lacks the ability to hydrolyze some of the organophosphate metabolites.
- PON3 is similar to type 1 in activity but differs from it in substrate specificity. Serum PON3 activity is one hundredth that of PON1. Additionally, it is not regulated by inflammation and levels of oxidised lipids. Both PON1 and PON3 are bound to HDL and because of their similar properties as antioxidants, it is possible PON3 also plays a role in the prevention of LDL and HDL oxidation.

== Biological function ==
PONs have been found to perform a number of biological functions, although the primary role of this group of enzymes is still a topic of speculation. Some of the observed roles have revealed activities of anti-inflammatory, anti-oxidative, anti-atherogenic, anti-diabetic, anti-microbial and organophosphate-hydrolyzing properties. Two of the most important known roles that PONs play are in functioning as a lactonase and an esterase. These properties provide a promising potential for development of new therapeutic interventions to combat a number of health conditions.

The three PON1 are found in different parts of the cell. PON1 is mainly found on secreted HDL. PON2 is mainly found in the mitochondria and the endoplasmic reticulum. PON3 is found in the endoplasmic reticulum, mitochondria and on HDL. The different functions of the PONs come from their individual catalytic abilities, cellular localization, and upstream regulatory pathways. PON1 is the most promiscuous: it can hydrolyze the broadest range of compounds.

=== Endogenous compounds ===
All three of the PONs work as lactonases. They all play a role in modulating oxidative stress and inflammation. Some genetic variations are associated with risks of stroke and/or neurodegenerative disorders.

All three PONs also break down N-Acyl homoserine lactones, which are quorum sensing molecules used by Pseudomonas aeruginosa. Doing so disrupts the bacterium's pathogenesis. (Quorum-quenching N-acyl-homoserine lactonase, EC 3.1.1.81.)

PON1 degrades homocysteine thiolactone, though because there are two enzymes much more efficient at this task than PON1, it is likely not the physiologically relevant HCTLase.

=== Synthetic compounds ===
==== Organophosphates ====
PON1, the first member of the class, was originally discovered for its role in the breakdown of organophosphates. Two Enzyme Commission numbers are assigned to this group of functions: aryldialkylphosphatase (EC 3.1.8.1; "ADPase") for the digestion of paraxon; and a DFPase (EC 3.8.2.2) activity in the digestion of fluorinated nerve agents.

PON1 is the major enzyme invovled in defense against organophosphate insecticides and nerve gases.

==== Drugs ====
PON1 is responsible for activating the prodrugs prulifloxacin abd olmesartan medoxomil. It also inactivates many drugs, especially ones with a lactone structure (for some drugs this helps confine their site of action to target tissues). It can also lactonize the hydroxyl group of some drugs. PON2 and PON3 are simimilar in their lactonase/lactonizing activity, though with different specificities.

== Mechanism ==
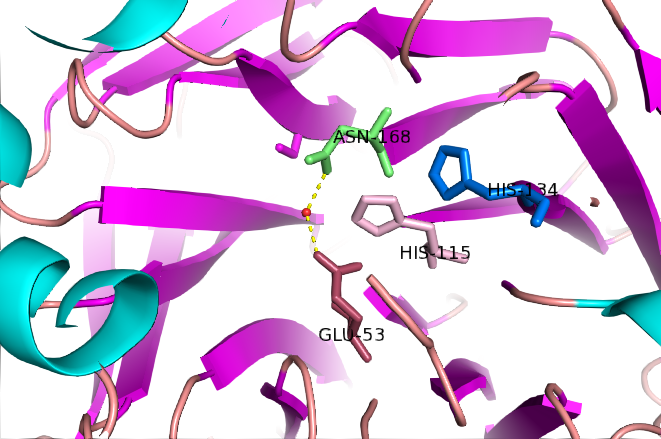
One of the proposed lactonase active sites for serum paraoxonase-1 identifying relevant residues as well as the catalytic calcium ion. No substrate was used in this crystallized structure.

The study of this family of enzymes has been something of interest for a number of years now; however, the lack of identifying specific natural substrates and numerous physiological roles has made it difficult in determining mechanisms of action for the diverse number of reactions catalyzed by this enzyme family. One of the more studied mechanisms is the lactonase mechanism of Serum Paraoxonase-1. One of the proposed mechanism outlines the hydrolysis of 5-membered ring lactone substrates by serum Paraoxonase-1. PON1, as with PON2 and PON3, utilizes a catalytic calcium ion, which functions as an oxy-anion to stabilize substrate and reaction states. Additionally, this enzyme active site employs two histidine residues (His115 and 134) involved in proton transfers, a glutamic acid (Glu53) to stabilize reactive hydrogens, and an asparagine (Asn168) to stabilize transition states and intermediates in the active site. The exact mechanism is still a subject of further research and it is suggested that the His115 residue is not necessary for the lactonase and arylesterase activity of the enzyme.

== Regulation ==
One of the common inhibitors of enzymatic activity (for PON 1 and PON 3) is lipid peroxides found in the plasma. Lipid peroxides can inhibit Paraoxonase activity as an arylesterase and antioxidant, although the specific inhibition is dependent on the type of lipid head group. An important implication of this fact is that, in decreasing the activity of PON1 and PON3, the productivity of preventing oxidation of LDL. Enzyme activity is also regulated by a substrate-dependent polymorphism that occurs at position 192. There are two known isoforms, one having an arginine residue at the 192 position and the other a glutamine, which are associated with high and low enzymatic activity respectively.

== Clinical significance ==
The development of atherosclerosis is a complex process, although the main underlying feature is simply an increase in low-density lipoprotein (LDL) oxidation. PON1 and PON3 prevent the formation of atherogenic oxidised-LDL, the form of LDL present in foam cells of an atheromatous plaque. Because of their know association with high-density lipoprotein (HDL) and their effect on oxidized-LDL, PON1 and PON3 are implicated in lowering the risk of developing coronary artery disease and atherosclerosis.

== History ==
PON was identified as an enzyme having organophosphates as its substrates. Reports of the geographic differences in population frequencies of paraoxonase activity and genetic analysis led to uncovering the genetic polymorphism. The name paraoxonase was given because of its ability to hydrolyze paraoxon, a toxic metabolite that comes from pesticide parathion. Subsequent environmental health risks have been reported in areas near high pesticide usage, paraoxonase enzyme mutations being associated with neurological disease development, e.g. amyotrophic lateral sclerosis (ALS).

The 3D crystal structure of PON1 was determined in 2004.

== Evolution ==
In mammals, the three PON genes are located in a gene cluster in the same direction, probably from tandem duplication of an ancestral enzyme. Within each species the three paralogs share share ∼70% identity at the nucleotide level and 60% identity at the amino acid level, and across species the orthologous groups each share 81%–90% identity at the nucleotide level and 79%–90% identity at the amino acid. In non-mammalian vertebrate species (birds and fish), generally only one copy of PON is present.

A complete trace of the history of PON genes among animals was published in 2023, showing numerous instances of gene gain and a few instances of loss. The mammalian triplication was found to have occurred at the base of all mammals (placentals, marsupials, monotremes), with monotremes secondarily losing two of the copies afterwards. The bushtail possum Trichosurus vulpecula has had its own gene expansion, producing two more copies of PON3 followed by positively selected diversification. Marine mammals, on the other hand, have undergone a convergent loss of functional PON1.

A recognizably similar lactone hydrolase (O93793) is known from the wilt fungus Fusarium oxysporum. This suggests that a similar enzyme is present in the common ancestor of fungi and animals.
