= A-esterase =

A-esterase may refer to one of two enzymes:

- Arylesterase (3.1.1.2)
- Aryldialkylphosphatase (3.1.8.1)

Some enzymes (such as PON1) demonstrate both activities. In fact, the two activities used to be thought as one and the same.
