= PTE =

PTE or Pte may refer to:

== Organizations ==
- Workers' Party of Ecuador, the Partido de los Trabajadores de Ecuador
- Party of Labour of Spain, the Partido del Trabajo de España
- Passenger transport executive, a type of local government body responsible for public transport in the United Kingdom
- Prairie Theatre Exchange, a theatre in Winnipeg, Manitoba, Canada
- Private Training Establishment, a category of tertiary education organisations in New Zealand
- University of Pécs (Pécsi Tudományegyetem), Hungary

== Science and technology ==
- Periodic table of elements
- Phosphotriesterase, an enzyme
- PicturesToExe, slideshow software
- Post-traumatic epilepsy, recurrent seizures that result from head trauma
- Power Tab Editor, guitar tablature software
- Pressure-tolerant electronics, components that operate satisfactorily under high pressure, such as in submarines
- Page table entry, the operating system's mapping of virtual address to physical address in a page table
- Phantom Transfer Engine, software used with the Spirit DataCine
- CVH-PTE engine, a Ford CVH engine
- Performance testing environment, in a performance test

== Other uses ==
- Pearson Test of English, several of the Pearson Language Tests
- Portuguese escudo, the former official currency of Portugal
- Private (rank), a military rank
- Permission to enter
- Proprietary company in Singapore
