= OPA anhydrase =

OPA anhydrase may refer to:

- Diisopropyl-fluorophosphatase, an enzyme
- Aryldialkylphosphatase, an enzyme
