= Dayananda Siddavattam =

Indian molecular biologist

Prof. Dayananda Siddavattam
- Citizenship: Indian
- Education: PhD from Sri Venkateswara University, Tirupati
- Occupations: Academic, Professor
- Title: Ex Vice Chancellor, GITAM (Deemed to be University)

Dayananda Siddavattam (born 1957) is an Indian molecular biologist and academic administrator who served as the Vice-Chancellor of GITAM (Deemed to be University). An elected fellow of the National Academy of Sciences, India, the Indian Academy of Sciences, and the Indian National Science Academy, Siddavattam's research work is focused on molecular biology, environmental microbiology, and the regulation of gene expression.

== Life and career ==
Siddavattam was born in a village near Piler in present-day Madanapalli district, Andhra Pradesh, India. He completed his undergraduate studies with a major in biology and earned a PhD from Sri Venkateswara University, Tirupati, in 1985.

During his tenure at SKU, he received international fellowships, including the DAAD fellowship from the Government of Germany and the Commonwealth Academic Staff Fellowship from the British Council, United Kingdom. He undertook postdoctoral research at the Institute of Genetics, University of Bayreuth, Germany, under Walter Kling Müller, and at the John Innes Centre, England, under M. J. Merrick. His work during this period focused on microbial genetics and molecular microbiology.

In 2004, Siddavattam joined the University of Hyderabad as a professor and served there until his retirement in 2022. He held several administrative positions at the university, including Senior Professor, Dean of the School of Life Sciences, and Chief Proctor. He then served as the Vice-Chancellor of GITAM University, Visakhapatnam.

Siddavattam's research has primarily focused on bacterial phosphotriesterases (PTEs), enzymes capable of hydrolyzing organophosphate compounds including insecticide residues and nerve agents. His work demonstrated the occurrence of opd genes encoding PTEs on mobile genetic elements and their lateral transfer among soil bacteria. His research group also reported the presence of twin-arginine transport (TAT) motifs in PTE signal peptides and showed that these enzymes are inserted into bacterial membranes in a prefolded state as part of a multiprotein complex associated with the TonB transport system, which is involved in nutrient transport in Gram-negative bacteria. In addition to fundamental research, Siddavattam collaborated with defense and scientific organizations in India to develop PTE-based biosensors for detecting organophosphate insecticides and nerve agents. He has also served as a consultant to pharmaceutical and biotechnology organizations.

== Honours and recognition ==
Siddavattam has received several national and international recognitions, including the International Research Development Award from the Wellcome Trust, United Kingdom. He is an elected Fellow of the Indian National Science Academy, the Indian Academy of Sciences, and the National Academy of Sciences, India. He has also received the J. C. Bose National Fellowship from the Science and Engineering Research Board, Government of India, and the Prime Minister Professorship from the Anusandhan National Research Foundation.
