= C6H15O4P =

The molecular formula C_{6}H_{15}O_{4}P (molar mass: 182.15 g/mol, exact mass: 182.0708 u) may refer to:

- Diisopropylphosphate
- Triethyl phosphate
