= AIIB (disambiguation) =

AIIB may refer to:

- Asian Infrastructure Investment Bank, a development bank for the Asia-Pacific region
- Japanese Red Army, also known as the Anti-Imperialist International Brigade
- Quorum-quenching N-acyl-homoserine lactonase, an enzyme also known as AiiB
