= APMAP =

Protein-coding gene in humans

Identifiers
- Aliases: APMAP, BSCv, C20orf3, adipocyte plasma membrane associated protein
- External IDs: OMIM: 615884; MGI: 1919131; GeneCards: APMAP

Gene location (Human)
Chr.	Chromosome 20 (human)
Band	20p11.21	Start	24,962,925 bp
Band	20p11.21	End	24,992,751 bp

Gene location (Mouse)
Chr.	Chromosome 2 (mouse)
Band	2|2 G3	Start	150,425,000 bp
Band	2|2 G3	End	150,450,487 bp
RNA expression pattern
Bgee	Human / Mouse (ortholog); Top expressed in: cerebellar vermis; right lobe of liver; cerebellar hemisphere; granulocyte; middle temporal gyrus; right hemisphere of cerebellum; right lobe of thyroid gland; left lobe of thyroid gland; blood; Brodmann area 23 / Top expressed in: decidua; brown adipose tissue; Epithelium of choroid plexus; white adipose tissue; right kidney; supraoptic nucleus; yolk sac; motor neuron; subcutaneous adipose tissue; ascending aorta; More reference expression data
BioGPS	More reference expression data
Gene ontology
Molecular function	strictosidine synthase activity; arylesterase activity
Cellular component	membrane; cell surface; integral component of membrane; endoplasmic reticulum; extracellular exosome
Biological process	biosynthesis; biological process
Sources:Amigo / QuickGO
Orthologs
Databases	NCBI: entry; OMA: entry
Species	Human	Mouse
Entrez	57136	71881
Ensembl	ENSG00000101474	ENSMUSG00000033096
UniProt	Q9HDC9	Q9D7N9
RefSeq (mRNA)	NM_020531	NM_027977; NM_001356491; NM_001356492
RefSeq (protein)	NP_065392	NP_082253; NP_001343420; NP_001343421
Location (UCSC)	Chr 20: 24.96 – 24.99 Mb	Chr 2: 150.43 – 150.45 Mb
PubMed search
- Wikidata
View/Edit Human	View/Edit Mouse

Adipocyte plasma membrane-associated protein is an enzyme that in humans is encoded by the APMAP gene. This protein shows activity as an arylesterase, and may be involved in adipocyte differentiation.
