= AIIC =

AIIC may refer to:

- International Association of Conference Interpreters
- Quorum-quenching N-acyl-homoserine lactonase, an enzyme
