= 2-pyrone-4,6-dicarboxylate lactonase =

Class of enzymes

2-pyrone-4,6-dicarboxylate lactonase (LigI)

Identifiers
- EC no.: 3.1.1.57
- CAS no.: 84177-55-9

Databases
- BRENDA: enzyme data
- ExPASy: NiceZyme view
- KEGG: enzyme entry
- MetaCyc: metabolic pathway
- Rhea: reactions
- PDB structures: RCSB PDB PDBe PDBsum
- Gene Ontology: AmiGO / QuickGO
Search
- PMC: articles
- PubMed: articles
- NCBI: proteins

2-pyrone-4,6-dicarboxylate lactonase (EC 3.1.1.57, LigI) is an enzyme that catalyzes the reversible hydrolytic reaction

2-oxo-2H-pyran-4,6-dicarboxylic acid
H_{2}O
H_{2}O
4-oxalmesaconic acid

The enzyme characterised from Pseudomonas species hydrolyses 2-oxo-2H-pyran-4,6-dicarboxylic acid to 4-oxalmesaconic acid. The reaction is part of the degradation pathwy for gallic acid. It plays an important role in the metabolism of lignin-derived aromatic compounds in both the syringate degradation pathway and the protocatechuate 4,5-cleavage pathway.

The enzyme belongs to the amidohydrolase superfamily and is a member of Cluster of Orthologous Groups (COG) 3618. LigI from Sphingomonas is of particular interest as it has been shown to be the first amidohydrolase not to require a divalent metal cation for catalytic activity. The systematic name of this enzyme is 2-oxo-2H-pyran-4,6-dicarboxylate lactonohydrolase.

== Mechanism ==
The mechanism of catalysis of LigI has been determined by crystallography and NMR analysis. The hydrolytic water molecule is activated by the transfer of a proton to Asp-248 whereas the carbonyl group of the 2-pyrone-4,6-dicarboxylate (PDC) lactone substrate is activated by hydrogen bonding interactions with His-180, His-31, and His-33.
