= Steroid-lactonase =

steroid-lactonase

Identifiers
- EC no.: 3.1.1.37
- CAS no.: 37288-08-7

Databases
- BRENDA: enzyme data
- ExPASy: NiceZyme view
- KEGG: enzyme entry
- MetaCyc: metabolic pathway
- Rhea: reactions
- PDB structures: RCSB PDB PDBe PDBsum
- Gene Ontology: AmiGO / QuickGO
Search
- PMC: articles
- PubMed: articles
- NCBI: proteins

Steroid-lactonase (EC 3.1.1.37) is an enzyme that catalyzes the reaction

testololactone
H_{2}O
testolic acid

The enzyme characterised from Cephalosporium acremonium hydrolyses the steroid, testololactone, to testolic acid.

This enzyme belongs to the family of hydrolases, specifically those acting on carboxylic ester bonds. The systematic name testololactone lactonohydrolase.
