= Triacetate-lactonase =

Class of enzymes

triacetate-lactonase

Identifiers
- EC no.: 3.1.1.38
- CAS no.: 9023-02-3

Databases
- BRENDA: enzyme data
- ExPASy: NiceZyme view
- KEGG: enzyme entry
- MetaCyc: metabolic pathway
- Rhea: reactions
- PDB structures: RCSB PDB PDBe PDBsum
- Gene Ontology: AmiGO / QuickGO
Search
- PMC: articles
- PubMed: articles
- NCBI: proteins

Triacetate-lactonase (EC 3.1.1.38) is an enzyme that catalyzes the reaction

triacetic acid lactone
H_{2}O
triacetic acid

The enzyme hydrolyses triacetic acid lactone to triacetic acid.

This enzyme is a hydrolase, specifically one acting on carboxylic ester bonds. The systematic name is triacetolactone lactonohydrolase. Other names in use include triacetic lactone hydrolase, triacetic acid lactone hydrolase, TAL hydrolase, and triacetate lactone hydrolase.
