= Gluconolactonase =

Class of enzymes

gluconolactonase
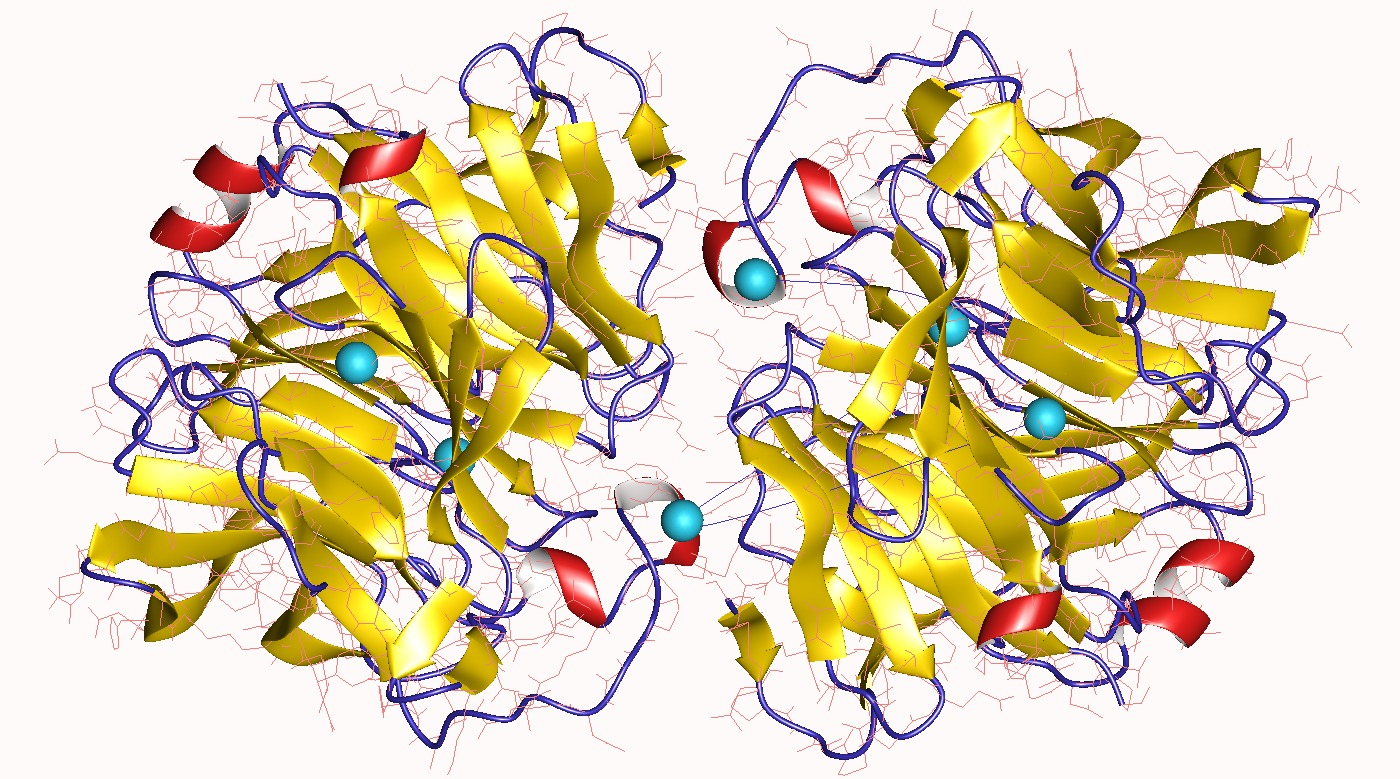
- Gluconolactonase homodimer, Xanthomonas campestris

Identifiers
- EC no.: 3.1.1.17
- CAS no.: 9012-73-1

Databases
- BRENDA: enzyme data
- ExPASy: NiceZyme view
- KEGG: enzyme entry
- MetaCyc: metabolic pathway
- Rhea: reactions
- PDB structures: RCSB PDB PDBe PDBsum
- Gene Ontology: AmiGO / QuickGO
Search
- PMC: articles
- PubMed: articles
- NCBI: proteins

Gluconolactonase (EC 3.1.1.17) is an enzyme that catalyzes the reaction

glucono-δ-lactone
H_{2}O
gluconic acid

The enzyme characterised from baker's yeast hydrolyses glucono-δ-lactone to give gluconic acid. Its structure has been determined by X-ray crystallography.

This enzyme is a hydrolase, specifically one acting on carboxylic ester bonds. The systematic name is D-glucono-1,5-lactone lactonohydrolase. Other names in common use include lactonase, aldonolactonase, glucono-δ-lactonase, and gulonolactonase.
