= PON1 =

Protein-coding gene in the species Homo sapiens

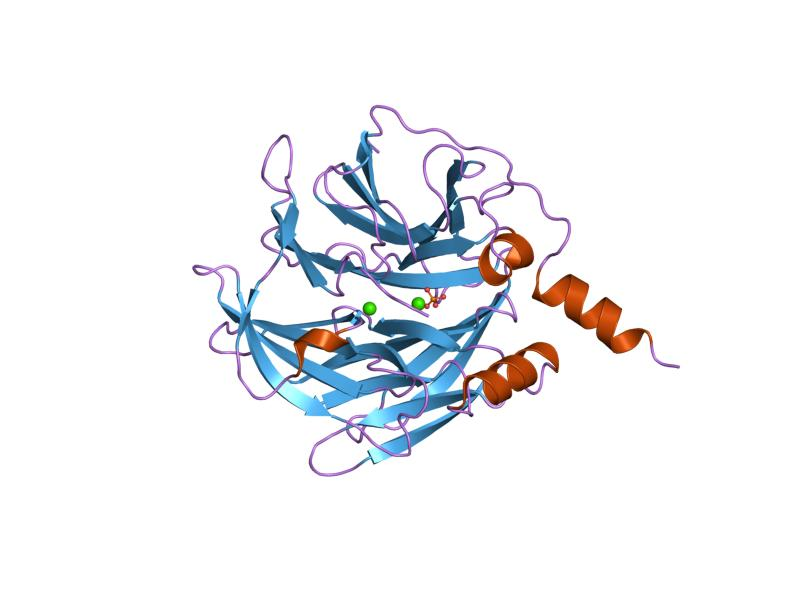

Identifiers
- Aliases: PON1, ESA, MVCD5, PON, paraoxonase 1
- External IDs: OMIM: 168820; MGI: 103295; GeneCards: PON1
Available structures
PDB	Ortholog search: PDBe RCSB
PDB	List of PDB id codes 1V04
Enzyme activity
EC #	BRENDA	ExPASy	KEGG	MetaCyc
3.1.1.2	↗	↗	↗	↗
3.1.1.81	↗	↗	↗	↗
3.1.8.1	↗	↗	↗	↗

Gene location (Human)
Chr.	Chromosome 7 (human)
Band	7q21.3	Start	95,297,676 bp
Band	7q21.3	End	95,324,532 bp

Gene location (Mouse)
Chr.	Chromosome 6 (mouse)
Band	6 A1|6 1.99 cM	Start	5,168,090 bp
Band	6 A1|6 1.99 cM	End	5,193,946 bp
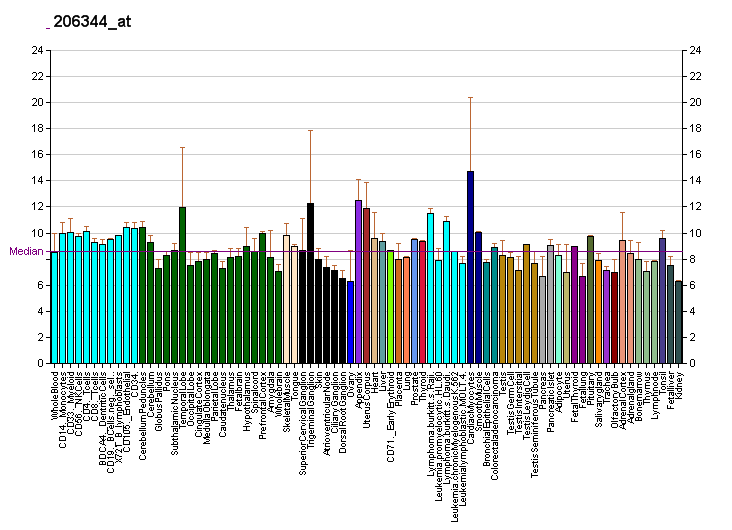

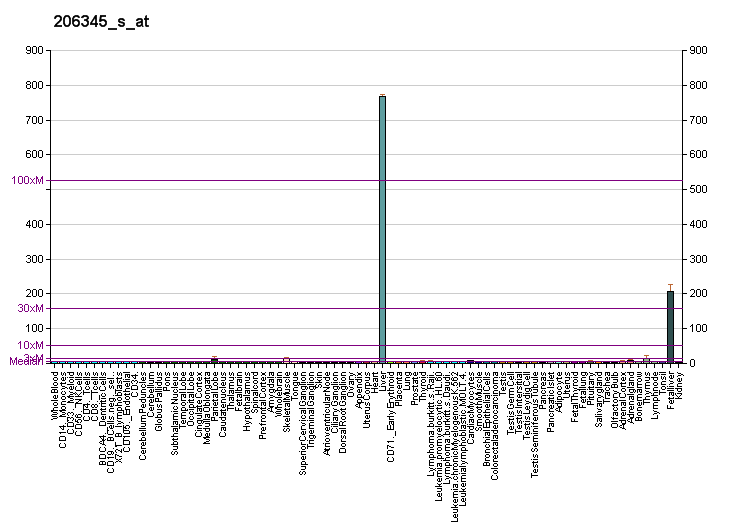
RNA expression pattern
Bgee	Human / Mouse (ortholog); Top expressed in: right lobe of liver; testicle; left adrenal gland; secondary oocyte; right adrenal gland; right adrenal cortex; left adrenal cortex; gonad; gallbladder; thymus / Top expressed in: retinal pigment epithelium; olfactory epithelium; left lobe of liver; right lung lobe; left lung; left lung lobe; tunica adventitia of aorta; carotid body; gallbladder; trachea; More reference expression data
BioGPS	More reference expression data
Gene ontology
Molecular function	calcium ion binding; protein homodimerization activity; metal ion binding; aryldialkylphosphatase activity; arylesterase activity; hydrolase activity; phospholipid binding; quorum-quenching acyl-L-homoserine-lactone lactonohydrolase activity
Cellular component	blood microparticle; intracellular membrane-bounded organelle; spherical high-density lipoprotein particle; high-density lipoprotein particle; extracellular exosome; extracellular region; extracellular space
Biological process	response to fatty acid; positive regulation of transporter activity; negative regulation of plasma lipoprotein oxidation; lipid metabolism; carboxylic acid catabolic process; cholesterol metabolic process; positive regulation of binding; response to nutrient levels; response to fluoride; positive regulation of cholesterol efflux; response to external stimulus; organophosphate catabolic process; aromatic compound catabolic process; phosphatidylcholine metabolic process; response to toxic substance; dephosphorylation; lipoxygenase pathway
Sources:Amigo / QuickGO
Orthologs
Databases	NCBI: entry; OMA: entry
Species	Human	Mouse
Entrez	5444	18979
Ensembl	ENSG00000005421	ENSMUSG00000002588
UniProt	P27169	P52430
RefSeq (mRNA)	NM_000446	NM_011134
RefSeq (protein)	NP_000437	NP_035264
Location (UCSC)	Chr 7: 95.3 – 95.32 Mb	Chr 6: 5.17 – 5.19 Mb
PubMed search
- Wikidata
View/Edit Human	View/Edit Mouse

Paraoxonase 1 (PON1) also known as Serum paraoxonase and arylesterase 1, A esterase, homocysteine thiolactonase or serum aryldialkylphosphatase 1, is an enzyme that in humans is encoded by the PON1 gene. It is the founding member of the paraoxonase (PON) multigene family, the genes for which are located adjacent to each other on chromosome 7.

PON1 is originally noted for its "paraoxonase" (aryldialkylphosphatase) activity, the ability to break down the organophosphate pesticide paraoxon. It is also long known to be an arylesterase, though neither class of compound are common in vivo. Its native (evolutionarily speaking) activity appears to be that of a promiscuous lactonase and esterase. PON1 on HDL (different from soluble PON1) is responsible for significant atheroprotection rendered by the HDL.

== Structure ==
Human PON1 is a glycoprotein composed of 354 amino acids and has a molecular weight of 43,000 daltons which associates with high-density lipoprotein (HDL) in the circulation. Serum PON1 is secreted mainly by the liver, although local synthesis occurs in several tissues and PON1 protein is found in almost all tissues. X-ray crystallography has revealed the structure of PON1 to be a 6 bladed propeller with a unique lid structure covering the active site passage which allows association with HDL.

== Function ==
PON1 is responsible for hydrolysing organophosphate pesticides and nerve gases. Polymorphisms in the PON1 gene significantly affect the catalytic ability of the enzyme.

PON1 (paraoxonase 1) is also a major anti-atherosclerotic component of high-density lipoprotein (HDL). The PON1 gene is activated by PPAR-γ, which increases synthesis and release of paraoxonase 1 enzyme from the liver, reducing atherosclerosis.

PON1 is a highly promiscuous enzyme capable of hydrolysing a wide variety of substrates, such as lactones, including thiolactones and pharmaceutical agents such as statins. PON1 substrates also include glucuronide drugs, arylesters, cyclic carbonates, organophosphorus pesticides and nerve gases such as sarin, soman and VX, oestrogen esters and lipid peroxides (oxidized lipids). Oxidized polyunsaturated fatty acids (notably in oxidized low-density lipoprotein) form lactone-like structures that are PON substrates.

== Genetics ==
PON1 in humans is encoded by the PON1 gene, which is located on the long arm of chromosome 7. PON1 activity can vary by over 40 fold between individuals. The biggest effect on PON1 activity levels is through PON1 genetic polymorphisms. Many nutritional, life-style and pharmaceutical modulators of PON1 are also known.

The coding region PON1-Q192R polymorphism determines a substrate dependent effect on activity. Many organophosphates used in pesticides, such as paraoxon, are hydrolysed faster by the PON1-R allozyme. Other substrates such as diazoxon, lipid-peroxides and sarin are hydrolysed more rapidly by the PON1-Q allozyme.

Both the coding region PON1-L55M and the promoter region PON1-T-108C polymorphisms are associated with different serum concentrations and therefore activities. The 55L allele results in significantly higher PON1 mRNA and serum protein levels and therefore activity compared to the 55M allele. The -108C allele has greater promoter activity than the -108T allele which results in different serum activities.

The distribution of the PON1 polymorphisms varies with ethnicity. The frequency of the PON1-192R allele increases the further from Europe a population originates, the frequency in Caucasians of 15-30% increases to 70-90% in Far Eastern Oriental and Sub-Saharan African populations. In the southern US, African-Americans are five times more likely to be RR than Caucasians. In contrast, the PON1-55M allele is much less frequent in Oriental and black African populations compared to Caucasians and are extremely rare or absent in some populations e.g. Thais. These ethnic differences in SNP distribution can lead to large activity differences between populations.

== Clinical significance ==
PON1 was first discovered through its ability to hydrolyse and therefore detoxify organophosphorus compounds which are widely used as pesticides and nerve gases. PON1 protects humans from the acute and chronic harmful effects of these compounds. Low PON1 activity found in children may increase their susceptibility to organophosphates. Because PON1-Q is more protective against sarin than PON1-R, the PON1-R allele and low PON1-Q activity levels are associated with Gulf War Illness.

The greatest research interest has been the role of PON1 in atherosclerosis, where, because of its ability to remove harmful oxidised-lipids, PON1 protects against the development of atherosclerosis.

PON1 also protects against bacterial infection by destroying the bacterial signalling molecules that cause gram negative bacteria to invade human tissue and form colonies, thus PON1 contributes to the bodies innate immunity.

Recently it has been suggested that PON1 has a role in healthy aging, however, the mechanism is currently unknown.

PON1 activity is low in infants compared to adults. A study of Mexican-American children showed that PON1 activity increased 3.5 times between birth and age seven.

An association between PON1 gene polymorphism and susceptibility to Parkinson's disease was not found in a Chinese population.
