= Diisopropyl-fluorophosphatase =

Class of enzymes

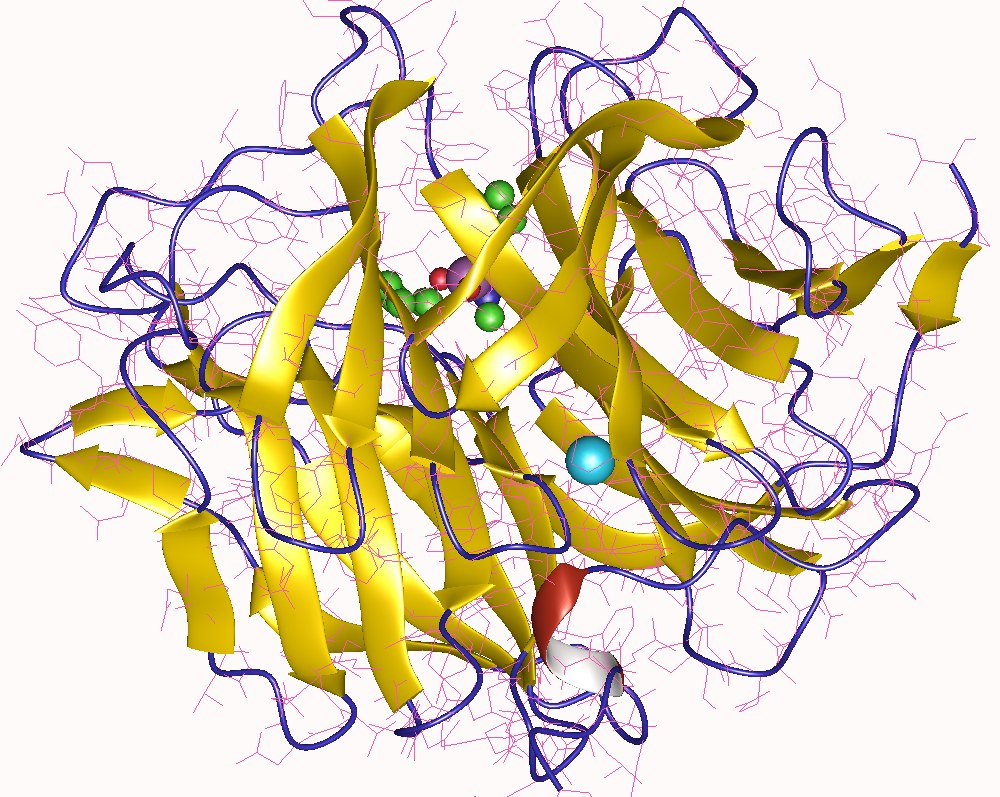
- Diisopropyl fluorophosphatase monomer, Loligo vulgaris

Identifiers
- EC no.: 3.8.2.2
- CAS no.: 9032-18-2

Databases
- BRENDA: enzyme data
- ExPASy: NiceZyme view
- KEGG: enzyme entry
- MetaCyc: metabolic pathway
- Rhea: reactions
- PDB structures: RCSB PDB PDBe PDBsum
- Gene Ontology: AmiGO / QuickGO
Search
- PMC: articles
- PubMed: articles
- NCBI: proteins

Diisopropyl-fluorophosphatase (EC 3.8.2.2, DFPase) refers to any enzyme able to catalyzes the reaction

diisopropyl fluorophosphate
H_{2}O
F^{-}
diisopropylphosphate

This hydrolyses the nerve agent, diisopropyl fluorophosphate (DFP), to diisopropylphosphate and fluoride ion. Many examples are able to defeat a range of similar nerve agents used in chemical warfare.

This enzyme is a hydrolase, specifically one acting on ester bonds phosphoric-triester hydrolases. The systematic name is diisopropyl-fluorophosphate fluorohydrolase. It requires a divalent cation such as calcium as a cofactor and is inhibited by chelating agents. Other names in use include:

- Phrasing variants: diisopropylphosphofluoridase, dialkyllfluorolphosphatase, diisopropyl phosphorofluoridate hydrolase, isopropyllphosphorolfluoridase, and diisopropyllfluorolphosphonate dehalogenase.
- Referring to other specific agents: tabunase, somanase.
- More general terminology: organophosphorus acid anhydrolase (OPAA), organophosphate acid anhydrase, OPA anhydrase (see also EC 3.8.2.-, "Hydrolases; Acting on halide bonds; In P-halide compounds").

The kind of activity is found in a diverse range of organisms, including protozoa, squid and clams, mammals, and soil bacteria. Most examples of the enzyme also double as an aryldialkylphosphatase (EC 3.1.8.1), an enzyme that degrades arylated organophosphate compounds. DFPase was formally assigned EC 3.1.8.2 and aryldialkylphosphatase formally EC 3.8.2.1 – demonstrative of the close relationships of these enzymes.

Because DFP (and other nerve agents) is not a natural compound, the ability to break it down is most likely an accident of evolution and not the native biological role of these enzymes. Some examples are apparently involved in cellular dipeptide metabolism.

== Examples ==
The enzyme from Loligo vulgaris (European squid; Q7SIG4) head ganglion has been shown to detoxify a wide variety of similar nerve agents. Similar enzymes are found in other squid species. Todarodes pacificus (Japanese squid) DFPase has nearly no aryldialkylphosphatase (ADPase) activity towards paraoxon while the European squid DFPase is more capable.

A highly active form of the enzyme (pepQ; Q44238) is typically isolated from the marine bacteria Alteromonas undina for laboratory study. This form is both halophilic and thermophilic, making it particularly useful for detoxification applications. Its main in vivo function seems to be that of a C-terminal Xaa-Pro dipeptidase (EC 3.4.13.9). It is also efficient at degrading non-halogenated organophosphates (ADPase activity).

Less active variants of OPAA have also been isolated in slime mold, duckweed, and mung beans. Human PON1 is a very weak DFPase.

== Structure ==
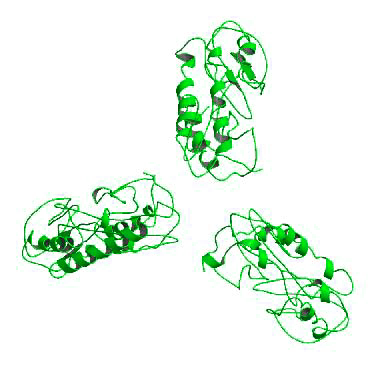
Figure 2: pepQ trimer

The Alteromonas version, pepQ (also known as opaA), is a single polypeptide composed of 517 amino acids, with a molecular weight of 58 kDa. The three-dimensional crystal structure of pepQ is a trimer, as seen in Figure 2. The enzyme has a 22% amino acid homology with human prolidase (PEPD) and a 30% homology to E. coli aminopeptidase P (P15034). pepQ is unstable under harsh conditions, losing its activity in the presence of organic solvents, at elevated temperature, and over long-term storage. Unprotected pepQ is also vulnerable to inhibition from other enzymes. InterPro classifies it as a member of the Xaa-Pro dipeptidase family, IPR022846.

The squid version has also been crystallized. Unlike pepQ it is a monomeric protein, a beta-propeller that comprises six blades: these two proteins have arrived at the same catalytic activity from very different origins. InterPro classifies this enzyme as a member of the "SMP-30/Gluconolactonase/LRE-like region" family, which includes human regucalcin and PON1, two other animal enzymes known to break down nerve agents. Its endogenous function is unclear.

=== Structural studies ===
As of late 2007, 16 structures have been solved for this class of enzymes, with PDB accession codes PDB: 1E1A, PDB: 1PJX, PDB: 2GVU, PDB: 2GVV, PDB: 2GVW, PDB: 2GVX, PDB: 2IAO, PDB: 2IAP, PDB: 2IAQ, PDB: 2IAR, PDB: 2IAS, PDB: 2IAT, PDB: 2IAU, PDB: 2IAV, PDB: 2IAW, and PDB: 2IAX.

== Mechanism ==
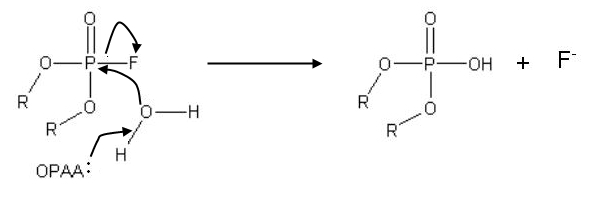
Figure 1: pepQ reaction mechanism

Although the exact mechanism of pepQ's nerve-agent detoxification is unclear, researchers have deduced that the basic reaction follows a general base mechanism with a simple in-line displacement of fluoride at the phosphorus center using an activated water molecule, as seen in Figure 1.

pepQ activity is enhanced by reducing agents such as dithiothreitol (DTT) and beta-mercaptoethanol. pepQ is also catalytically active over a wide pH range between 6.5 and 9.5 and temperature range between 10 and 65 °C, and is stimulated by manganese.

== Industrial relevance ==
OPAA’s susbstrate-specificity to organophosphorus-containing compounds, especially fluoride-containing G-type nerve agents such as sarin, cyclosarin, tabun, and soman, have drawn the interest of the U.S. Army. That attention has resulted in the establishment of a biodegradation program in search of safe and effective means of disposal for chemical weapons in the 1980s; the program is currently called the Advanced Catalytic Enzyme System (ACES).
