= Limonin-D-ring-lactonase =

Class of enzymes

Identifiers
- EC no.: 3.1.1.36
- CAS no.: 9031-17-8

Databases
- BRENDA: enzyme data
- ExPASy: NiceZyme view
- KEGG: enzyme entry
- MetaCyc: metabolic pathway
- Rhea: reactions
- PDB structures: RCSB PDB PDBe PDBsum
- Gene Ontology: AmiGO / QuickGO
Search
- PMC: articles
- PubMed: articles
- NCBI: proteins

Limonin-D-ring-lactonase (EC 3.1.1.36) is an enzyme that catalyzes the reaction

limonin
H_{2}O
limonoate A-ring-lactone

The enzyme characterised from Citrus seeds hydrolyses the triterpenoid, limonin, specifically at the lactone forming the D-ring. The product, limonoate A-ring-lactone, retains its A-ring lactone. Limonin is a bitter-tasting component of the seeds but limonoate A-ring-lactone is less bitter.

This enzyme is a hydrolase, specifically one acting on carboxylic ester bonds. The systematic name of this enzyme class is limonoate-D-ring-lactone lactonohydrolase. Other names in common use include limonin-D-ring-lactone hydrolase, and limonin lactone hydrolase.
