= Actinomycin lactonase =

Class of enzymes

actinomycin lactonase

Identifiers
- EC no.: 3.1.1.39
- CAS no.: 37288-09-8

Databases
- IntEnz: IntEnz view
- BRENDA: BRENDA entry
- ExPASy: NiceZyme view
- KEGG: KEGG entry
- MetaCyc: metabolic pathway
- PRIAM: profile
- PDB structures: RCSB PDB PDBe PDBsum
- Gene Ontology: AmiGO / QuickGO
Search
- PMC: articles
- PubMed: articles
- NCBI: proteins

The enzyme actinomycin lactonase (EC 3.1.1.39) catalyzes the reaction

actinomycin + H_{2}O $\rightleftharpoons$ actinomycinic monolactone

This enzyme belongs to the family of hydrolases, specifically those acting on carboxylic ester bonds. The systematic name is actinomycin lactonohydrolase.
