= Pressure-tolerant electronics =

Pressure-tolerant electronics (PTE) are electronic components or assemblies that can operate satisfactorily under high pressure (hyperbaric or hydrostatic, such as oil baths), without the need of a high pressure enclosure.

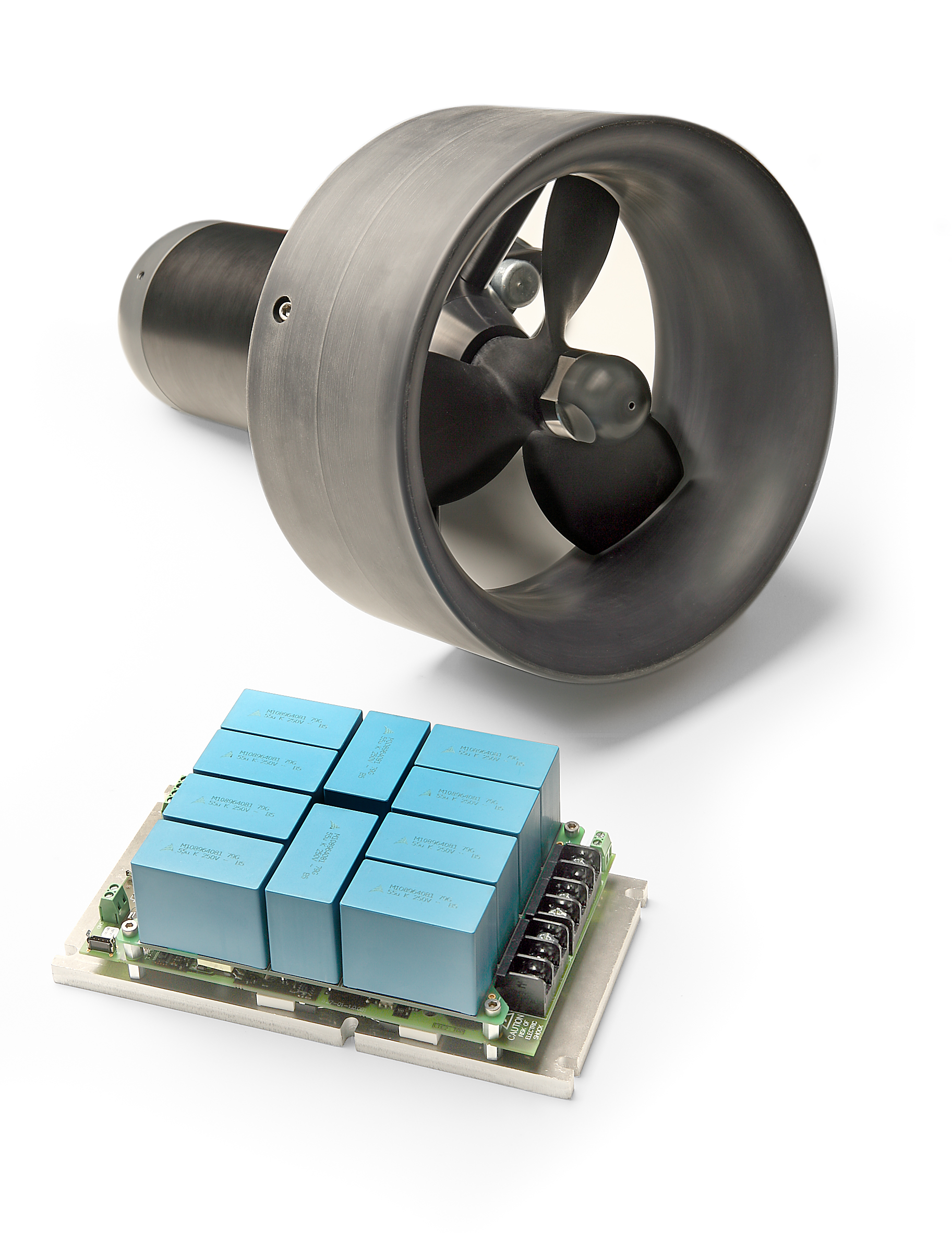
OEM pressure tolerant servo amplifier from Ingenia Motion Control for subsea thrusters installed on remotely operated vehicles (ROVs) and crewed submersibles.

Typical uses include in submarines and oil wells.

== Components ==
| Component | PTE | non-PTE |
|---|---|---|
| Connectors | All | None |
| Resistors | Carbon film, metal film, wire wound, tin oxide | Carbon comp. |
| Capacitors | Ceramic, film, solid tantalum | Aluminum electrolytic, wet-slug tantalum, paper |
| Relays and contactors | Open (operation is significantly slower) | Sealed |
| Semiconductors | Epoxy enclosed | Metal can |
| Crystals | - | Surface mount or metal can |
| Resonators | Surface mount or epoxy coated | - |
