= PON2 =

Protein-coding gene in the species Homo sapiens

Identifiers
- Aliases: PON2, paraoxonase 2
- External IDs: OMIM: 602447; MGI: 106687; GeneCards: PON2
Enzyme activity
EC #	BRENDA	ExPASy	KEGG	MetaCyc
3.1.1.2	↗	↗	↗	↗
3.1.1.81	↗	↗	↗	↗

Gene location (Human)
Chr.	Chromosome 7 (human)
Band	7q21.3	Start	95,404,862 bp
Band	7q21.3	End	95,435,329 bp

Gene location (Mouse)
Chr.	Chromosome 6 (mouse)
Band	6 A1|6 1.99 cM	Start	5,264,147 bp
Band	6 A1|6 1.99 cM	End	5,298,455 bp
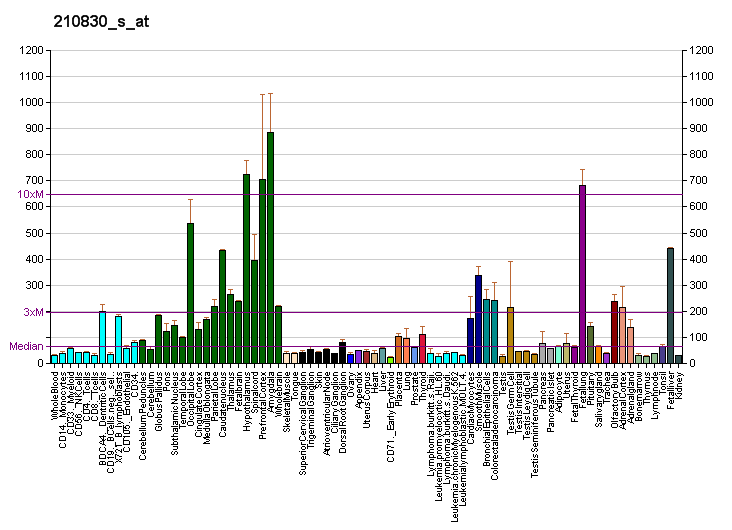

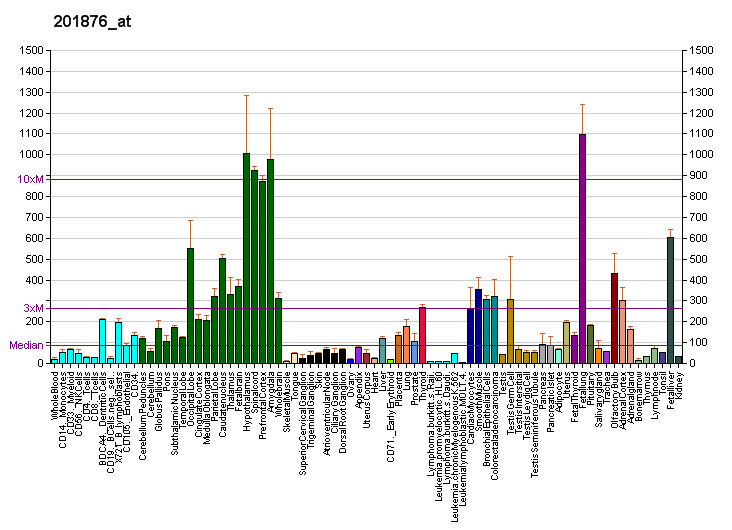
RNA expression pattern
Bgee	Human / Mouse (ortholog); Top expressed in: right lung; nucleus accumbens; right adrenal cortex; amygdala; putamen; external globus pallidus; jejunal mucosa; ventricular zone; left adrenal gland; caudate nucleus / Top expressed in: epithelium of stomach; epithelium of lens; ciliary body; stroma of bone marrow; mucous cell of stomach; retinal pigment epithelium; skin of external ear; corneal stroma; ileum; right lung lobe; More reference expression data
BioGPS	More reference expression data
Gene ontology
Molecular function	hydrolase activity; metal ion binding; identical protein binding; arylesterase activity; quorum-quenching acyl-L-homoserine-lactone lactonohydrolase activity
Cellular component	plasma membrane; lysosome; mitochondrion; nucleus; membrane; intracellular membrane-bounded organelle; extracellular region
Biological process	aromatic compound catabolic process; response to oxidative stress; response to toxic substance; lipoxygenase pathway
Sources:Amigo / QuickGO
Orthologs
Databases	NCBI: entry; OMA: entry
Species	Human	Mouse
Entrez	5445	330260
Ensembl	ENSG00000105854	ENSMUSG00000032667
UniProt	Q15165	Q62086
RefSeq (mRNA)	NM_000305; NM_001018161	NM_183308
RefSeq (protein)	NP_000296; NP_001018171	NP_899131
Location (UCSC)	Chr 7: 95.4 – 95.44 Mb	Chr 6: 5.26 – 5.3 Mb
PubMed search
- Wikidata
View/Edit Human	View/Edit Mouse

Serum paraoxonase/arylesterase 2 is an enzyme that in humans is encoded by the PON2 gene.

This gene encodes a member of the paraoxonase gene family, which includes three known members located adjacent to each other on the long arm of chromosome 7. The encoded protein is ubiquitously expressed in human tissues, membrane-bound, and may act as a cellular antioxidant, protecting cells from oxidative stress. Hydrolytic activity against acylhomoserine lactones, important bacterial quorum-sensing mediators, suggests the encoded protein may also play a role in defense responses to pathogenic bacteria. Mutations in this gene may be associated with vascular disease and a number of quantitative phenotypes related to diabetes. Alternatively spliced transcript variants encoding different isoforms have been described.
