= Xylono-1,4-lactonase =

Class of enzymes

xylono-1,4-lactonase

Identifiers
- EC no.: 3.1.1.68

Databases
- BRENDA: enzyme data
- ExPASy: NiceZyme view
- KEGG: enzyme entry
- MetaCyc: metabolic pathway
- Rhea: reactions
- PDB structures: RCSB PDB PDBe PDBsum
- Gene Ontology: AmiGO / QuickGO
Search
- PMC: articles
- PubMed: articles
- NCBI: proteins

The enzyme xylono-1,4-lactonase (EC 3.1.1.68) catalyzes the reaction

D-xylono-1,4-lactone
H_{2}O
H_{2}O
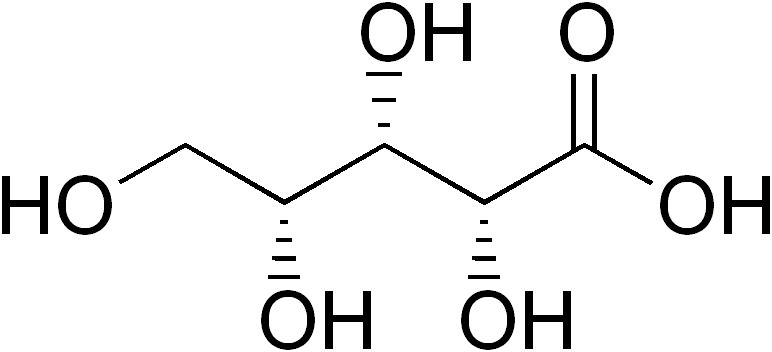
D-xylonic acid

The enzyme characterised from Pseudomonas fragi and Gluconobacter oxydans hydrolyses D-xylono-1,4-lactone to D-xylonic acid. The enzyme is of interest as a target for metabolic engineering.

This enzyme is a hydrolase, specifically one acting on carboxylic ester bonds. The systematic name of this enzyme class is D-xylono-1,4-lactone lactonohydrolase. Other names in common use include xylono-γ-lactonase, and xylonolactonase.
