= Deoxylimonate A-ring-lactonase =

deoxylimonate A-ring-lactonase

Identifiers
- EC no.: 3.1.1.46
- CAS no.: 75788-82-8

Databases
- IntEnz: IntEnz view
- BRENDA: BRENDA entry
- ExPASy: NiceZyme view
- KEGG: KEGG entry
- MetaCyc: metabolic pathway
- PRIAM: profile
- PDB structures: RCSB PDB PDBe PDBsum
- Gene Ontology: AmiGO / QuickGO
Search
- PMC: articles
- PubMed: articles
- NCBI: proteins

The enzyme deoxylimonate A-ring-lactonase (EC 3.1.1.46) catalyzes the reaction

deoxylimonate + H_{2}O $\rightleftharpoons$ deoxylimononic acid D-ring-lactone

The reaction opens the A-ring-lactone of the triterpenoid deoxylimonic acid, leaving the D-ring-lactone intact.

This enzyme belongs to the family of hydrolases, specifically those acting on carboxylic ester bonds. The systematic name is deoxylimonate A-ring-lactonohydrolase.
