= Arylesterase =

Class of enzymes

arylesterase

Identifiers
- EC no.: 3.1.1.2
- CAS no.: 9032-73-9

Databases
- BRENDA: enzyme data
- ExPASy: NiceZyme view
- KEGG: enzyme entry
- MetaCyc: metabolic pathway
- Rhea: reactions
- PDB structures: RCSB PDB PDBe PDBsum
- Gene Ontology: AmiGO / QuickGO
Search
- PMC: articles
- PubMed: articles
- NCBI: proteins

The enzyme arylesterase (EC 3.1.1.2) catalyzes the reaction

a phenyl acetate + H_{2}O $\rightleftharpoons$ a phenol + acetate

This enzyme belongs to the family of hydrolases, specifically those acting on carboxylic ester bonds. The systematic name of this enzyme class is aryl-ester hydrolase. Other names in common use include A-esterase and aromatic esterase. This enzyme participates in bisphenol a degradation.

The activity of arylesterase was, for a time, thought to be the same as aryldialkylphosphatase (EC 3.1.8.1) or merely a special case of it. Indeed, the animal PON enzymes (of the six-blade beta-propeller class) and the archaeal Are enzyme (of the alpha/beta hydrolase class) are documented as exhibiting both activities. The two enzyme Commission numbers share the trivial name of "A-esterase" due to this shared history.

Three human genes code for proteins with this activity: PON1, PON2, PON3.

== Structural studies ==
As of late 2007, two structures have been solved for this class of enzymes, with PDB accession codes PDB: 1V04 and PDB: 1VA4.
