= Diisopropylphosphate =

Names
- Preferred IUPAC name Di(propan-2-yl) hydrogen phosphate

Identifiers
CAS Number	1611-31-0
3D model (JSmol)	Interactive image; Interactive image
ChEBI	CHEBI:16785
ChemSpider	66772
ECHA InfoCard	100.015.048
KEGG	C03113
MeSH	Diisopropylphosphate
PubChem CID	74162
UNII	UDP2G9LN2X
CompTox Dashboard (EPA)	DTXSID40167060
- InChI: InChI=1S/C6H15O4P/c1-5(2)9-11(7,8)10-6(3)4/h5-6H,1-4H3,(H,7,8) Key: WZPMZMCZAGFKOC-UHFFFAOYSA-N
- SMILES: CC(C)OP(=O)(O)OC(C)C; O=P(OC(C)C)(OC(C)C)O

Properties
Chemical formula	C_{6}H_{15}O_{4}P
Molar mass	182.156 g·mol^{−1}
- Except where otherwise noted, data are given for materials in their standard state (at 25 °C [77 °F], 100 kPa). verify (what is ?) Infobox references

Diisopropylphosphate (DIPP) is an organophosphate compound with the chemical formula C6H15O4P. It is a phosphate monoester and acts as an acetylcholinesterase inhibitor through covalent interaction with the enzyme.

== Chemistry ==
Diisopropylphosphate consists of two isopropoxy groups attached to a phosphate group. It is the conjugate base of diisopropyl hydrogen phosphate and is structurally related to a number of organophosphorus compounds, including diisopropyl fluorophosphate.

== Biological significance ==
Diisopropylphosphate is formed during the hydrolysis of diisopropyl fluorophosphate (DFP), a potent organophosphorus acetylcholinesterase inhibitor. The enzyme diisopropyl-fluorophosphatase catalyzes the conversion of DFP to diisopropylphosphate and fluoride ions.

== See also ==
- Diisopropyl-fluorophosphatase
