= 1,4-lactonase =

Class of enzymes

Identifiers
- EC no.: 3.1.1.25
- CAS no.: 37278-38-9

Databases
- BRENDA: enzyme data
- ExPASy: NiceZyme view
- KEGG: enzyme entry
- MetaCyc: metabolic pathway
- Rhea: reactions
- PDB structures: RCSB PDB PDBe PDBsum
- Gene Ontology: AmiGO / QuickGO
Search
- PMC: articles
- PubMed: articles
- NCBI: proteins

1,4-lactonase (EC 3.1.1.25) is an enzyme that catalyzes the generic reaction

a 1,4-lactone + H_{2}O $\rightleftharpoons$ a 4-hydroxyacid

For example, the enzyme characterised from human blood and rat liver microsomes gives the sugar acid, D-galactonic acid by hydrolyis of D-galactono-1,4-lactone:

D-galactono-1,4-lactone
H_{2}O
D-galactonic acid

This enzyme is a hydrolase, specifically one acting on carboxylic ester bonds. The systematic name is 1,4-lactone hydroxyacylhydrolase. It is also called γ-lactonase. It requires calcium as Ca^{2+}.

== Structural studies ==
As of late 2007, three structures have been solved for this class of enzymes, with PDB accession codes PDB: 2DG0, PDB: 2DG1, and PDB: 2DSO.

== Applications ==
A 1,4-lactonase was expressed in Escherichia coli and used as a highly efficient biocatalyst for asymmetric synthesis of chiral compounds.
