= PON3 =

Protein-coding gene in the species Homo sapiens

Identifiers
- Aliases: PON3, paraoxonase 3
- External IDs: OMIM: 602720; MGI: 106686; GeneCards: PON3
Enzyme activity
EC #	BRENDA	ExPASy	KEGG	MetaCyc
3.1.1.2	↗	↗	↗	↗
3.1.1.81	↗	↗	↗	↗
3.1.8.1	↗	↗	↗	↗

Gene location (Human)
Chr.	Chromosome 7 (human)
Band	7q21.3	Start	95,359,872 bp
Band	7q21.3	End	95,396,375 bp
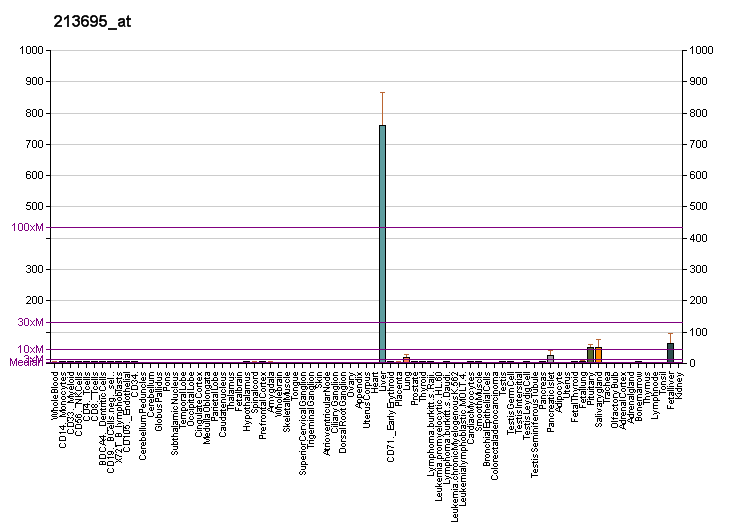
RNA expression pattern
Bgee	Human / Mouse (ortholog); Top expressed in: right lobe of liver; parotid gland; pituitary gland; left ovary; anterior pituitary; testicle; gonad; palpebral conjunctiva; right ovary; islet of Langerhans / n/a; More reference expression data
BioGPS	More reference expression data
Gene ontology
Molecular function	arylesterase activity; dihydrocoumarin hydrolase activity; 3,4-dihydrocoumarin hydrolase activity; aryldialkylphosphatase activity; hydrolase activity; protein homodimerization activity; metal ion binding; quorum-quenching acyl-L-homoserine-lactone lactonohydrolase activity
Cellular component	extracellular exosome; intracellular membrane-bounded organelle; extracellular region; extracellular space
Biological process	carboxylic acid catabolic process; negative regulation of superoxide anion generation; phenylacetate catabolic process; coumarin catabolic process; aromatic compound catabolic process; response to toxic substance; response to external stimulus; dephosphorylation; lipoxygenase pathway
Sources:Amigo / QuickGO
Orthologs
Databases	NCBI: entry; OMA: entry
Species	Human	Mouse
Entrez	5446	269823
Ensembl	ENSG00000105852	n/a
UniProt	Q15166	Q62087
RefSeq (mRNA)	NM_000940	NM_173006; NM_001363812
RefSeq (protein)	NP_000931	NP_766594; NP_001350741
Location (UCSC)	Chr 7: 95.36 – 95.4 Mb	n/a
PubMed search
- Wikidata
View/Edit Human	View/Edit Mouse

Paraoxonase 3, also known as PON3, is a protein which in humans is encoded by the PON3 gene.

== Function ==
This gene is a member of the paraoxonase family and lies in a cluster on chromosome 7 with the other two family members. The encoded protein is secreted into the bloodstream and associates with high-density lipoprotein (HDL). The protein also rapidly hydrolyzes lactones and can inhibit the oxidation of low-density lipoprotein (LDL), a function that is believed to slow the initiation and progression of atherosclerosis. Alternatively spliced variants which encode different protein isoforms have been described; however, only one has been fully characterized.
