= Aryldialkylphosphatase =

Class of enzymes

Identifiers
- EC no.: 3.1.8.1
- CAS no.: 117698-12-1

Databases
- BRENDA: enzyme data
- ExPASy: NiceZyme view
- KEGG: enzyme entry
- MetaCyc: metabolic pathway
- Rhea: reactions
- PDB structures: RCSB PDB PDBe PDBsum
- Gene Ontology: AmiGO / QuickGO
Search
- PMC: articles
- PubMed: articles
- NCBI: proteins

Aryldialkylphosphatase (EC 3.1.8.1 ADPase; also known as phosphotriesterase [PTEase], organophosphate hydrolase, parathion hydrolase, paraoxonase, and parathion aryl esterase; systematic name aryltriphosphate dialkylphosphohydrolase) is a metalloenzyme that hydrolyzes the triester linkage found in organophosphate insecticides:

an aryl dialkyl phosphate + H_{2}O $\rightleftharpoons$ dialkyl phosphate + an aryl alcohol

A concrete example is:

paraoxon
H_{2}O
diethyl phosphite
+
4-Nitrophenol

Organophosphate is the general name for esters of phosphoric acid and is one of the organophosphorus compounds. They can be found as part of insecticides, herbicides, and nerve gases, amongst others. Some less-toxic organophosphates can be used as solvents, plasticizers, and EP additives. The use of organophosphates accounts for approximately 38% of all pesticide use globally.

== Classification ==
The EC entry as well as the name applies to any enzyme capable of the specified catalytic activity, regardless of how they achieve this goal. There are many structural classes under this heading, each with a different evolutionary approach to reach this goal. Furthermore, just because an enzyme can perform this activity, does not mean this has always been its natural purpose: organophosphate pesticides only started being used in the 1930s.

The activity of aryldialkylphosphatase was, for a time, thought to be the same as arylesterase (EC 3.1.1.2) or merely a special case of it. Indeed, the animal PON enzymes (of the six-blade beta-propeller class) and the archaeal Are enzyme (of the alpha/beta hydrolase class) are documented as exhibiting both activities. The two enzyme Commission numbers share the trivial name of "A-esterase" due to this shared history.

Another oft-confused class of enzymes is diisopropyl-fluorophosphatase (EC 3.8.2.2, DFPase), the enzyme that catalyzes the analogous reaction of removing a fluorine atom from a nerve agent molecule. Many DFPases double as ADPases, and many of the structural classes are the same. DFPase was formally assigned EC 3.1.8.2 and PTEase formally EC 3.8.2.1 – demonstrative of the close relationships of these enzymes.

== The PTE family ==
Phosphotriesterase family
- Structure of organophosphorus hydrolase (PDB: 1DPM)

Identifiers
- Symbol: PTE
- Pfam: PF02126
- InterPro: IPR001559
- PROSITE: PDOC01026
- SCOP2: 1dpm / SCOPe / SUPFAM
Available protein structures:
- PDB: 1bf6B:2-292 1i0dB:44-359 1i0bB:44-359 1jgmA:44-359 1ez2A:44-359 1dpmA:44-359 1pscA:44-359 1eywA:44-359 1hzyB:44-359 1qw7A:44-359 1pta :44-359 1p6cA:44-359 1p6bA:44-359 2d2hA:43-358 2d2jA:43-358 2d2gA:43-358 IPR001559 PF02126 (ECOD; PDBsum)
- AlphaFold: IPR001559; PF02126

The Pfam/InterPro entry for "PTE" is chracteristic of the enzyme coded for by the gene opd (for organophosphate-degrading) in Brevundimonas diminut. This gene is found in a large plasmid (pSC1, 51Kb). Very similar genes have also been found in many other bacterial species such as Flavobacterium sp. (ATCC27551), where a 100%-identical version is encoded in an extrachromosomal element (pSM55, 43Kb).

=== Structure ===
opd belongs to a family metalloenzymes that has two catalytic Zn^{2+} metal atoms, bridged via a common ligand and coordinated by imidazole side chains of histidine residues that are clustered around the metal atoms. The protein forms a homodimer. The overall structure consists of an α/β-barrel motif, also present in other 20 catalytic proteins. The active sites of these proteins is located at the C-terminal portion of the β-barrel, which is where the active site of PTE is also located.

=== Catalysis ===
Catalysis of organophosphates occurs via a nucleophilic substitution with inversion of configuration (S_{N}2 mechanism) about the phosphorus centre of the substrate. In the active site, the metal cations aid in catalysis by further polarizing the P–O bond of the substrate, which makes it more susceptible to a nucleophilic attack. Furthermore, a basic residue abstracts a proton from a water molecule, and the hydroxide ion produced bridges the two divalent cations and acts as the nucleophile. The OH^{−} then attacks the phosphorus centre of the substrate, followed by a proton transfer event. The P–O bond is broken, and the products are released from the active site. The turnover rate (k_{cat}) of phosphotriesterase is nearly 10^{4} s^{−1} for the hydrolysis of paraoxon, and the products are p-nitrophenol and diethyl phosphoric acid.

=== Subcellular localization ===
Schematic diagram of cell wall of Gram-negative bacteria (Pseudomonas) showing the inner membrane where PTE is anchored and the periplasmic space.

opd is a membrane-associated protein that is translated with a 29 amino acid-long target peptide (Tat motif), which is then cleaved from the mature protein after insertion in the plasma membrane. The protein is anchored to the inner membrane of the cell, facing the periplasm.

=== Occurrence ===
The exact match for opd is present in two species, Pseudomonas diminuta and Flavobacterium sp. ATCC27551. Similar PTE-family genes are found in the radioresistant Deinococcus radiodurans, pathogens Mycobacterium tuberculosis and Mycobacterium bovis, the anaerobic bacterium Desulfatibacillum alkenivorans, the thermophilic bacteria Geobacillus sp. and Thermoanaerobacter sp. X514, Escherichia coli (yhfV) and many other groups of bacteria.

Not all PTE-family genes are ADPases, however. The E. coli PTE quite narrowly targets phosphorylated glyceryl acetates and has no appetite for the aryl compounds.

==== Genomic context ====
Bacterial isolates capable of degrading organophosphate (OP) pesticides have been identified from soil samples from different parts of the world. The first organophosphate-degrading bacterial species was isolated from a soil sample from the Philippines in 1973, which identified as Flavobacterium sp. ATCC27551. Since then, other species have demonstrated to have OP-degrading abilities, such as Pseudomonas diminuta (isolated from US soil sample), Agrobacterium radiobacter (isolated from Australian soil sample), Alteromonas haloplanktis (isolated from US soil sample), and Pseudomonas sp. WBC-3 (isolated from Chinese soil sample).

The capacity to hydrolyze organophosphates is not unique to bacteria. A few fungi and cyanobacteria species have been found to also hydrolyze them. Moreover, through sequence homology searches of whole genomes, several other bacterial species were identified that also contain sequences from the same gene family as opd, including pathogenic bacteria such as Escherichia coli (yhfV) and Mycobacterium tuberculosis.

The gene sequence encoding the enzyme (opd) in Flavobacterium sp. ATCC27551 and Pseudomonas diminuta is highly conserved (100% sequence homology), although the plasmids where the genes are found have very different sequences apart from a 5.1Kb conserved region where the gene is found.

A closer look on the organization of the opd gene from Flavobacterium suggests a potential transposon-like architecture, which accounts for the widespread distribution of the gene among other microbial species that might have occurred through lateral DNA transfer. The opd gene is flanked by transposition insertion sequences, characteristic of Tn3 family of transposons. Moreover, a transposase-like sequence (homologous to TnpA) and a resolvase-like sequence (homologous to TnpR) were also identified in regions upstream of the opd gene, which are characteristics of class II transposons such as Tn3.

Furthermore, another open reading frame was identified downstream of opd and encodes a protein that further degrades p-nitrophenol, one of the byproducts of OP degradation. This protein is believed to work as a complex with PTE, since a dramatic increase in activity is observed when PTE is present.

Therefore, the characteristic architectural organization of the opd gene region suggests that different species acquired the gene through horizontal transfer through transposition and plasmid transfer.

== Other structural classes ==
The archaeal example , Are from Sulfolobus acidocaldarius (B5BLW5), is a member of the alpha/beta hydrolase superfamily.

The type found in animals, PON (human PON1, PON3), has a six-bladed beta-propeller structure.

== Function ==
PTE hydrolyzes organophosphate compounds by cleaving the triester linkage in the substrate. The exact substrate specificity and performance depend on the specific enzyme studied.

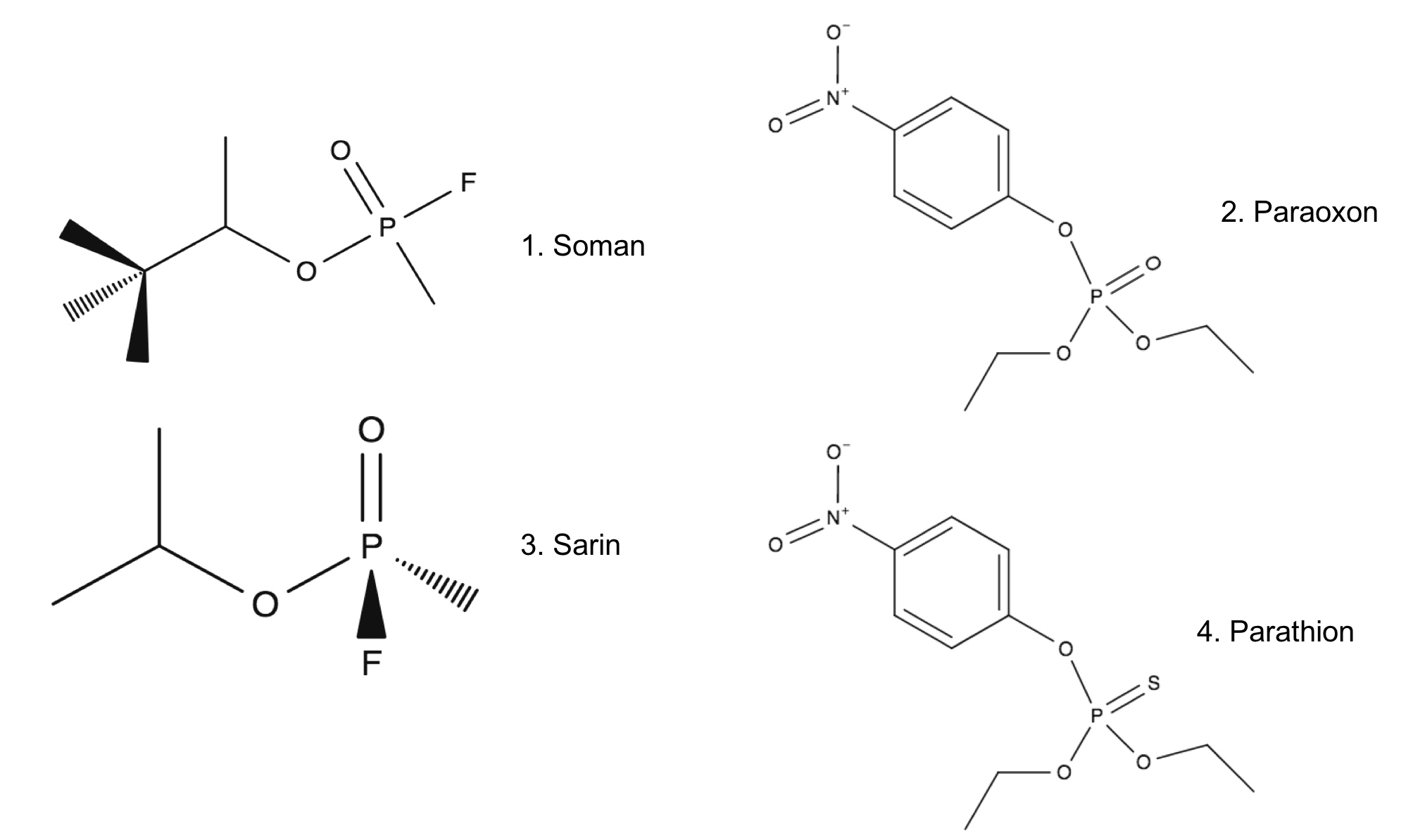
Organophosphate compounds that serve as substrates for enzyme-catalyzed hydrolysis by opd. Soman and sarin correspond to the DFPase activity.

=== opd ===
The enzyme has a very broad substrate specificity, and is very efficient in catalyzing the reaction: PTE hydrolyzes paraoxon at a rate approaching the diffusion limit, which indicates that the enzyme is optimally evolved for using this substrate. It acts specifically on synthetic organophosphate triesters and phosphorofluoridates. It does not seem to have a natural occurring substrate and may thus have optimally evolved for utilizing paraoxon and other common agricultural pesticides.

The products of the reaction are diethyl phosphoric acid and p-nitrophenol. The latter product is further degraded by an enzyme encoded 750bp downstream of the opd gene, and encodes a 29kDa putative hydrolase that may be involved in degrading aromatic compounds, and works in concert with PTE. This enzyme is homologous to hydrolases in Pseudomonas putida, Pseudomonas azelaica, Rhodococcus sp., and P. fluorescens.

Organophosphates are not toxic to bacteria, so this activity is likely not its main biological action. Some species of bacteria are also able to utilize organophosphates as a nutrient and carbon source, however: being able to break down these compounds may provide the bacteria with a source of nutrients in these very artificial situations.

=== Animals ===
The organophosphates do act as cholinesterase inhibitor poisons in animals. Although (again) addressing a problem of recent human creation, certain genetic variants of PON1 produce a more active enzyme, providing their carriers with more resistance to poisoning. PON1 also has many other functions not related to this catalytic reaction.

== Environmental significance ==
Phosphotriesterases are considered a strong candidate biocatalyst for bioremediation purposes. Its wide substrate specificity and catalytic efficiency makes it an attractive target for the potential use of microbes containing the opd gene in detoxifying soils that are toxic due to pesticide overuse. Moreover, organophosphates act as cholinesterase inhibitors. The AChE neurotransmitter is a vital component of the central nervous system (CNS) in insects in animals, and the inhibition of the proper turnover of this neurochemical results in overstimulation of the CNS, which ultimately results in death of insects and mammals. As a result, the use of organophosphate-degrading microorganisms is a potentially effective, low-cost, and environmentally friendly method of removing these toxic compounds from the environment.

== History ==
Bacterial species that had the ability to degrade organophosphate pesticides have been isolated from soil samples from different parts of the world. The first bacterial strain identified to be able to hydrolyze organophosphates was Flavobacterium sp. ATCC 27551, found by Sethunathan and Yoshida in 1973 from a soil sample originally from the Philippines. Since then, other species were found to also have organophosphate-degrading enzymes similar to that found in Flavobacterium.
