= Imidazolonepropionase =

Class of enzymes

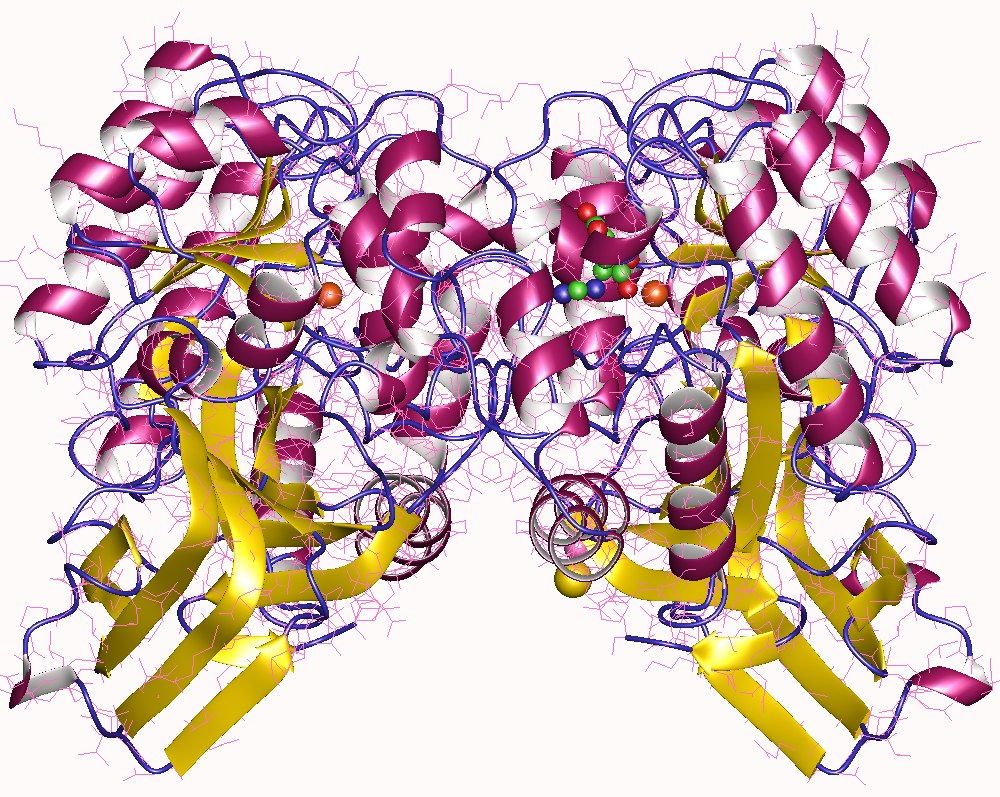
- imidazolonepropionase dimer, Agrobacterium fabrum

Identifiers
- EC no.: 3.5.2.7
- CAS no.: 9024-91-3

Databases
- BRENDA: enzyme data
- ExPASy: NiceZyme view
- KEGG: enzyme entry
- MetaCyc: metabolic pathway
- Rhea: reactions
- PDB structures: RCSB PDB PDBe PDBsum
- Gene Ontology: AmiGO / QuickGO
Search
- PMC: articles
- PubMed: articles
- NCBI: proteins

Imidazolonepropionase (EC 3.5.2.7) is an enzyme isolated from mammals that catalyzes the hydrolysis of imidazol-4-one-5-propionic acid to formiminoglutamic acid:

imidazol-4-one-5-propionic acid
H_{2}O
formiminoglutamic acid

The reaction is part of the breakdown pathway of the amino acid, histidine and the starting imidazolone is produced by the enzyme urocanase. Details of the catalytic mechanism, which uses zinc cations to activate water for the hydrolysis have been determined by X-ray crystallography. Quantum mechanical calculations have been used to explain why the racemic mixture of the starting material gives only a single enantiomer of the product.

This enzyme is a hydrolase, one acting on carbon-nitrogen bonds other than peptide bonds, specifically in cyclic amides. The systematic name of this enzyme class is 3-(5-oxo-4,5-dihydro-3H-imidazol-4-yl)propanoate amidohydrolase. Other names in common use include 4(5)-imidazolone-5(4)-propionic acid hydrolase, and imidazolone propionic acid hydrolase.

== Structural studies ==
As of late 2007, 6 structures have been solved for this class of enzymes, with PDB accession codes PDB: 2BB0, PDB: 2G3F, PDB: 2GOK, PDB: 2OOF, PDB: 2PUZ, and PDB: 2Q09.
