= Formimidoylglutamate deiminase =

Class of enzymes

Identifiers
- EC no.: 3.5.3.13
- CAS no.: 9054-85-7

Databases
- BRENDA: enzyme data
- ExPASy: NiceZyme view
- KEGG: enzyme entry
- MetaCyc: metabolic pathway
- Rhea: reactions
- PDB structures: RCSB PDB PDBe PDBsum
- Gene Ontology: AmiGO / QuickGO
Search
- PMC: articles
- PubMed: articles
- NCBI: proteins

Formimidoylglutamate deiminase (EC 3.5.3.13) is an enzyme characterised from Pseudomonas species that catalyzes the hydrolysis of formiminoglutamic acid to N-formyl-L-glutamic acid and ammonia:

formiminoglutamic acid
H_{2}O
NH_{3}
N-formyl-L-glutamic acid

The reaction is part of the catabolism of the amino acid, histidine, and this has a role in gut homeostasis.

This enzyme is a hydrolase, one acting on carbon-nitrogen bonds other than peptide bonds, specifically in linear amidines. The systematic name of this enzyme class is N-formimidoyl-L-glutamate iminohydrolase. Other names in common use include formiminoglutamate deiminase, and formiminoglutamic iminohydrolase.
