= Cis-Urocanic acid =

Chemical compound

cis-Urocanic acid

Clinical data
- Other names: (Z)-Imidazole-4-acrylic acid
- Drug class: Serotonin 5-HT_{2A} receptor agonist; Carcinogen

Identifiers
- IUPAC name: (Z)-3-(1H-imidazol-5-yl)prop-2-enoic acid
- CAS Number: 7699-35-6
- PubChem CID: 1549103
- ChemSpider: 1266070
- UNII: 5LM7WD7VIC
- ChEBI: CHEBI:30818
- ChEMBL: ChEMBL1316726
- CompTox Dashboard (EPA): DTXSID901316398

Chemical and physical data
- Formula: C_{6}H_{6}N_{2}O_{2}
- Molar mass: 138.126 g·mol^{−1}
- 3D model (JSmol): Interactive image
- SMILES: C1=C(NC=N1)/C=C\C(=O)O
- InChI: InChI=1S/C6H6N2O2/c9-6(10)2-1-5-3-7-4-8-5/h1-4H,(H,7,8)(H,9,10)/b2-1-; Key:LOIYMIARKYCTBW-UPHRSURJSA-N

cis-Urocanic acid (cis-UCA), also known as (Z)-imidazole-4-acrylic acid, is a chemical compound produced by ultraviolet (UV) irradiation of trans-urocanic acid, a metabolite naturally formed in the body from the amino acid histidine.

cis-Urocanic acid is suspected of involvement in the development of skin cancer. It acts as an immunosuppressant through action as an agonist of the serotonin 5-HT_{2A} receptor, which it binds to with relatively high affinity (K_{d} = 4.6 nM), and blocking this receptor has been shown to reduce cis-UCA mediated photocarcinogenesis. However the immunomodulatory effects of cis-UCA are complex and also involve other pathways, and at low levels it shows anti-inflammatory actions and may be protective against UV damage in the cornea and retina.

Measuring cis-UCA has been proposed as a sensitive method to detect sub-erythemal response to UVB, and thus a means to assess the UVR protection of suncreams.

== See also ==
- Serotonin 5-HT_{2A} receptor agonist
- List of miscellaneous 5-HT_{2A} receptor agonists
