= Imidazol-4-one-5-propionic acid =

Names
- IUPAC name 3-(5-Oxo-1,4-dihydroimidazol-4-yl)propanoic acid

Identifiers
| CAS Number | 17340-16-8 |
| 3D model (JSmol) | Interactive image |
| ChemSpider | 125 |
| KEGG | C03680 |
| MeSH | Imidazol-4-one-5-propionic+acid |
| PubChem CID | 128 |
| CompTox Dashboard (EPA) | DTXSID10864771 DTXSID40938378, DTXSID10864771 |
- InChI: InChI=1S/C6H8N2O3/c9-5(10)2-1-4-6(11)8-3-7-4/h3-4H,1-2H2,(H,9,10)(H,7,8,11) Key: HEXMLHKQVUFYME-UHFFFAOYSA-N
- SMILES: O=C1N\C=N/C1CCC(=O)O

Properties
| Chemical formula | C_{6}H_{8}N_{2}O_{3} |
| Molar mass | 156.139 |
- Except where otherwise noted, data are given for materials in their standard state (at 25 °C [77 °F], 100 kPa). Infobox references

Imidazol-4-one-5-propionic acid is an intermediate in the metabolism of histidine. It is a colorless compound that is sensitive to light and air. The compound features an imidazolone ring.

== Biosynthesis and metabolism ==
Imidazol-4-one-5-propionic acid is produced by the breakdown of the amino acid, histidine. Its immediate precursor is urocanic acid via the action of urocanase:

urocanic acid
H_{2}O
imidazol-4-one-5-propionic acid

The sequence continues when imidazolonepropionase converts this by hydrolysis to give formiminoglutamic acid:

imidazol-4-one-5-propionic acid
H_{2}O
formiminoglutamic acid

This reaction gives selectively a single enantiomer of the product, which is a derivative of L-glutamic acid.

== Clinical significance ==
Microbial production of imidazol-4-one-5-propionic acid in the human gut has been shown to affect insulin signaling, which is relevant to type II diabetes.

Imidazole propionate has been causally implicated in atherosclerosis and Parkinson’s disease, primarily by triggering inflammation. Streptococcus mutans, known for its role in dental caries, has been identified as a contributor to elevated ImP levels through the urdA gene, which is involved in the conversion of urocanate to ImP.
