= Urocanic aciduria =

- Other names: Urocanate hydratase deficiency or Urocanase deficiency
- Urocanic acid

Urocanic aciduria is an autosomal recessive metabolic disorder caused by a deficiency of the enzyme urocanase. It is a secondary disorder of histidine metabolism.

== Symptoms and signs ==
Urocanic aciduria is thought to be relatively benign. Although aggressive behavior and intellectual disability have been reported with the disorder, no definitive neurometabolic connection has yet been established.

== Genetics ==
Urocanic aciduria has an autosomal recessive pattern of inheritance.

Urocanic aciduria has an autosomal recessive inheritance pattern, which means the defective gene is located on an autosome, and two copies of the gene – one copy inherited from each parent – are required in order to be born with the disorder. The parents of an individual with an autosomal recessive disorder both carry one copy of the defective gene, but are usually not affected by the disorder.

== Pathophysiology ==
The amino acid histidine, when catalyzed by the enzyme histidase, forms urocanic acid. Disruptions in this pathway, caused by a deficiency of histidase, is the underlying cause of histidinemia. This results in reduced levels of skin and serum urocanic acid, the primary indicator of insufficient histidase activity.

In urocanic aciduria, increased urocanic acid in the urine indicates a deficiency of the enzyme urocanase.

With normal to only slightly elevated levels of histidine present in the liver during urocanic aciduria, the only true metabolic indicator of the disorder can be found in the urine.

== See also ==
- Inborn errors of metabolism
- Imidazole
- Aromatic amino acids
- Recessive disorders
