= Histidinol dehydrogenase =

Identifiers
- EC no.: 1.1.1.23
- CAS no.: 9028-27-7

Databases
- BRENDA: enzyme data
- ExPASy: NiceZyme view
- KEGG: enzyme entry
- MetaCyc: metabolic pathway
- Rhea: reactions
- PDB structures: RCSB PDB PDBe PDBsum
- Gene Ontology: AmiGO / QuickGO
Search
- PMC: articles
- PubMed: articles
- NCBI: proteins

Histidinol dehydrogenase
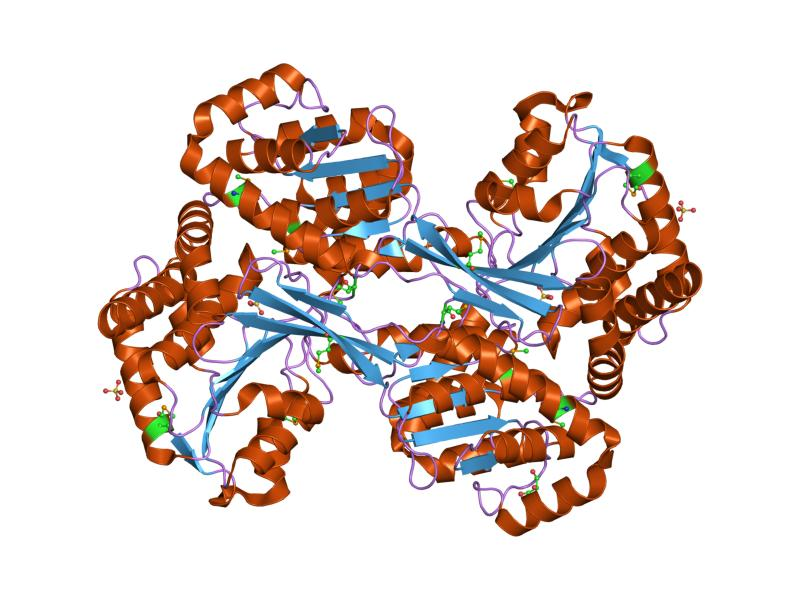
- the l-histidinol dehydrogenase (hisd) structure implicates domain swapping and gene duplication.

Identifiers
- Symbol: Histidinol_dh
- Pfam: PF00815
- Pfam clan: CL0099
- InterPro: IPR012131
- PROSITE: PDOC00534
- SCOP2: 1k75 / SCOPe / SUPFAM
Available protein structures:
- PDB: IPR012131 PF00815 (ECOD; PDBsum)
- AlphaFold: IPR012131; PF00815

Histidinol dehydrogenases (HIS4) (HDH) (EC 1.1.1.23) are a type of enzyme found in bacteria, fungi, and plants that catalyze the chemical reaction

L-histidinol
+ 2 NAD^{+}
2 H^{+}
2 H^{+}
L-histidine
+ 2 NADH

The two substrates of this enzyme are L-histidinol and oxidised nicotinamide adenine dinucleotide (NAD^{+}). Its products are L-histidine, reduced NADH, and two protons.

This enzyme belongs to the family of oxidoreductases, specifically those acting on the CH-OH group of donor with NAD^{+} or NADP^{+} as acceptor. The systematic name of this enzyme class is L-histidinol:NAD^{+} oxidoreductase. This enzyme is also called L-histidinol dehydrogenase.

== Structure ==
In bacteria, HDH is a single chain polypeptide; in fungi it is the C-terminal domain of a multifunctional enzyme which catalyses three different steps of histidine biosynthesis; and in plants it is expressed as a nuclear encoded protein precursor which is exported to the chloroplast.

=== Active site ===
Histidinol is held inside the active site thanks to a zinc ion, but the zinc ion does not participate in the catalysis otherwise. The zinc ion is held in place by His262, Gln259, Asp360 and His419 (which, in homodimeric histidinol dehydrogenases, comes from the other monomer). Histidinol itself is held in place by His327 and His367 from one moment unit and Glu414 from the other monomer unit.

A Cys residue has been implicated in the catalytic mechanism of the second oxidative step. However, according to newer studies with histidinol dehydrogenase from E. coli, the mechanism is catalyzed by four bases, B1-B4. His327 acts as the first base, deprotonating histidinol's hydroxyl group. Concomitantly, hydride is abstracted from histidinol by NAD^{+}, which is then exchanged for a second NAD^{+} molecule. Glu325 acts as the second base, deprotonating a molecule of water, which then attacks histidinol. At the same time, His327 (now protonated) donates a proton to the aldehydic oxygen, which results in a gem-diol. After then, His327 again deprotonates one of the hydroxyl groups and NAD^{+} abstracts a proton from the reactive carbon atom. This series of steps oxidizes the hydroxyl group to a carboxylic acid.

== Function ==
Histidinol dehydrogenase catalyzes the terminal step in the biosynthesis of histidine in bacteria, fungi, and plants, the four-electron oxidation of L-histidinol to histidine.

In 4-electron dehydrogenases, a single active site catalyses 2 separate oxidation steps: oxidation of the substrate alcohol to an intermediate aldehyde; and oxidation of the aldehyde to the product acid, in this case His. The reaction proceeds via a tightly- or covalently-bound intermediate, and requires the presence of 2 NAD molecules. By contrast with most dehydrogenases, the substrate is bound before the NAD coenzyme.

== Co-regulation of the gene ==
Histodinol dehydrogenase gene (HIS4) has been shown co-regulating the adjacent gene while it is under amino acids selective pressure.

== Structural studies ==
As of late 2007, 4 structures have been solved for this class of enzymes, with PDB accession codes PDB: 1K75, PDB: 1KAE, PDB: 1KAH, and PDB: 1KAR.
