= Imidazole propionate =

Clinical data
- Other names: ImP; 5-Imidazolepropionic acid; Imidazolylpropionic acid
- Drug class: Imidazoline I_{1} receptor activator
- ATC code: None

Identifiers
- IUPAC name: 3-(1H-imidazol-5-yl)propanoic acid
- CAS Number: 1074-59-5
- PubChem CID: 70630
- ChemSpider: 63798
- UNII: 8B1241598D
- KEGG: C20522
- ChEBI: CHEBI:73087
- ChEMBL: ChEMBL84253
- CompTox Dashboard (EPA): DTXSID30148040
- ECHA InfoCard: 100.012.769

Chemical and physical data
- Formula: C_{6}H_{8}N_{2}O_{2}
- Molar mass: 140.142 g·mol^{−1}
- 3D model (JSmol): Interactive image
- SMILES: C1=C(NC=N1)CCC(=O)O
- InChI: InChI=1S/C6H8N2O2/c9-6(10)2-1-5-3-7-4-8-5/h3-4H,1-2H2,(H,7,8)(H,9,10); Key:ZCKYOWGFRHAZIQ-UHFFFAOYSA-N

Imidazole propionate (ImP), also known as 5-imidazolepropionic acid, is a bacterial metabolite of histidine and a neurotoxin. It is produced by Streptococcus mutans and its enzyme urocanate reductase (UrdA) in the gut. S. mutans, as well as ImP production and circulating levels, have been found to be elevated in people with Parkinson's disease. In addition, administration of ImP, or colonization with ImP-producing bacteria, causes dopaminergic neurotoxicity and Parkinson's disease-like symptoms in rodents. Based on these findings, UrdA-expressing and ImP-producing bacteria may be involved in the etiology of Parkinson's disease in humans. ImP has also been implicated in the pathophysiology of other diseases such as atherosclerosis, diabetes, and Alzheimer's disease, among others. ImP activates the imidazoline I_{1} receptor and this appears to be involved in some of its toxic effects. Relatedly, imidazoline I_{1} receptor antagonists have been proposed for possible therapeutic purposes.

== See also ==
- Imidazol-4-one-5-propionic acid
