= Urocanic acid =

Names
- Preferred IUPAC name (2E)-3-(1H-imidazol-4-yl)prop-2-enoic acid
- Other names (E)-3-(1H-imidazol-4-yl)acrylic acid

Identifiers
CAS Number	104-98-3
3D model (JSmol)	Interactive image
ChEBI	CHEBI:30817
ChemSpider	643824
ECHA InfoCard	100.002.963
MeSH	Urocanic+acid
PubChem CID	1178
UNII	G8D26XJJ3B
CompTox Dashboard (EPA)	DTXSID50859181 DTXSID5041148, DTXSID50859181
- InChI: InChI=1S/C6H6N2O2/c9-6(10)2-1-5-3-7-4-8-5/h1-4H,(H,7,8)(H,9,10)/b2-1+ Key: LOIYMIARKYCTBW-OWOJBTEDSA-N; InChI=1/C6H6N2O2/c9-6(10)2-1-5-3-7-4-8-5/h1-4H,(H,7,8)(H,9,10)/b2-1+ Key: LOIYMIARKYCTBW-OWOJBTEDBA
- SMILES: c1c(nc[nH]1)/C=C/C(=O)O

Properties
Chemical formula	C_{6}H_{6}N_{2}O_{2}
Molar mass	138.124 g/mol
Melting point	225 °C (437 °F; 498 K)
- Except where otherwise noted, data are given for materials in their standard state (at 25 °C [77 °F], 100 kPa). verify (what is ?) Infobox references

Urocanic acid (formally trans-Urocanic acid) is an intermediate in the catabolism of L-histidine. The cis-urocanic acid isomer is rare.

== Ultraviolet radiation absorption ==
Urocanic acid is a chromophore with a strong, broad, and largely structureless absorption band that spans the UV-C and UV-B regions of the electromagnetic spectrum. Experimental measurements consistently find the absorption maximum, λmax, in the range of 267 nm to 280 nm, with the precise value being sensitive to its solvent's pH and polarity.

== Metabolism ==
It is formed from L-histidine through the action of histidine ammonialyase (also known as histidase or histidinase) by elimination of ammonium.

In the liver, urocanic acid is transformed by urocanate hydratase (or urocanase) to 4-imidazolone-5-propionic acid and subsequently to glutamic acid.

== Clinical significance ==
Inherited deficiency of urocanase leads to elevated levels of urocanic acid in the urine, a condition known as urocanic aciduria.

An important role for the onset of atopic dermatitis and asthma has been attributed to filaggrin, a skin precursor of urocanic acid.

Urocanic acid is thought to be a significant attractant of the nematode parasite Strongyloides stercoralis, in part because of relatively high levels in the plantar surfaces of the feet, the site through which this parasite often enters the body.

== Function ==
Urocanic acid is found in animal sweat and skin. its concentration varies greatly between people, from 4 nM per cm^{2} to 34 nM per cm^{2} with only small differences between areas other than at the sole of the foot and between sun-exposed and unexposed areas. Concentration does not link with age, sex, skin tone, photosensitivity, and stratum corneum thickness.

Among other functions, urocanic acid acts as an endogenous sunscreen or photoprotectant against UVB-induced DNA damage. However, some studies have questioned this.

Urocanic acid is found predominantly in the stratum corneum of the skin and it is likely that most of it is derived from filaggrin catabolism (a histidine-rich protein). When exposed to UVB irradiation, trans-urocanic acid is converted in vitro and in vivo to cis-urocanic acid (cis-UCA). The cis form is known to activate regulatory T cells. Measuring cis-UCA provides a sensitive means at sub-erythemal doses to detect UVB, and so offers a potential method to assess the UVR protection provided by suncreams.

Some studies attribute filaggrin an important role in keeping the skin surface slightly acidic, through a breaking down mechanism to form histidine and subsequently trans-urocanic acid, however others have shown that the filaggrin–histidine–urocanic acid cascade is not essential for skin acidification.

== History ==
Urocanic acid was first isolated in 1874 by the chemist Max Jaffé from the urine of a dog, hence the name (Latin: urina = urine, and canis = dog).

== See also ==
- Histidinemia
- Inborn error of metabolism
