= Histidine (data page) =

Chemical data page

The complete data for Histidine
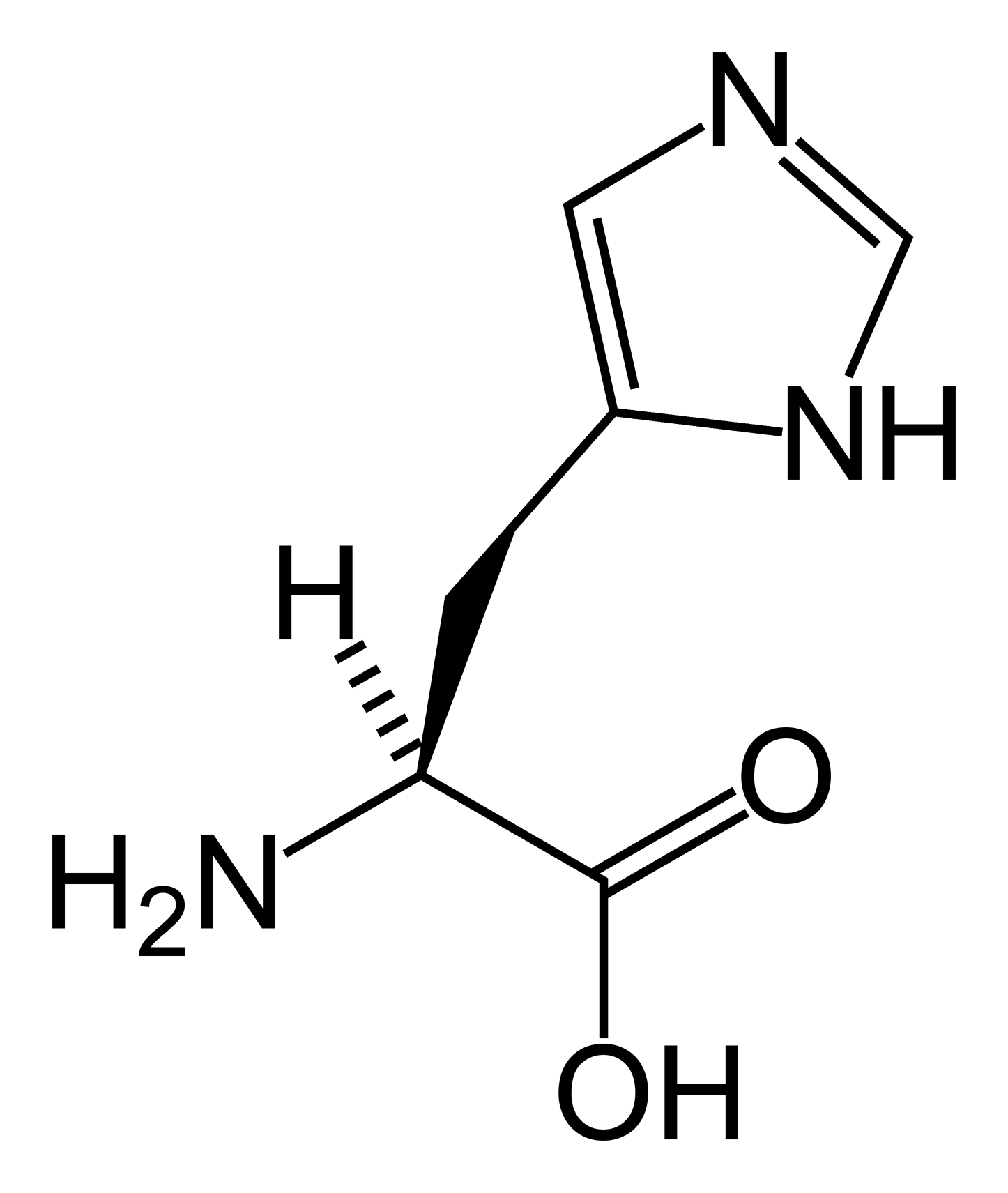
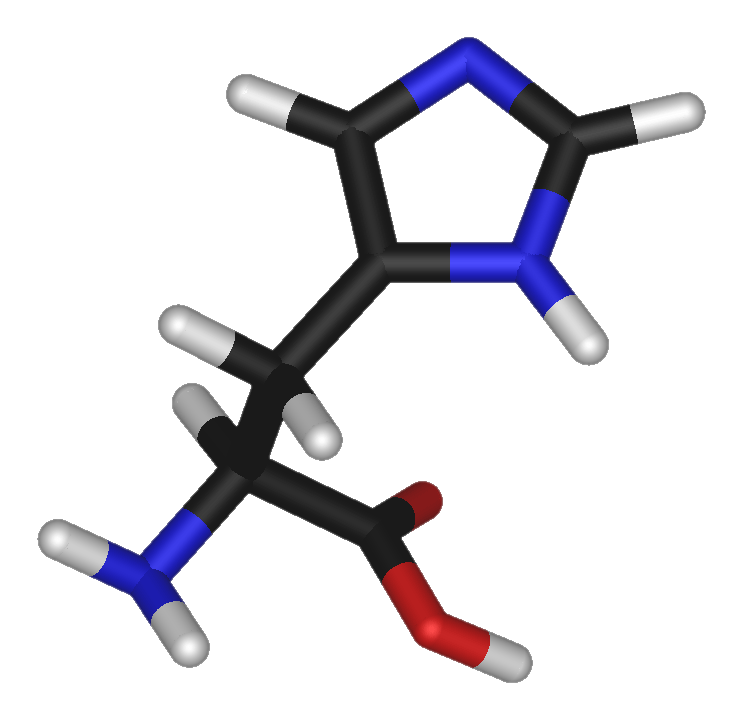
General information
Chemical formula: C_{6}H_{9}N_{3}O_{2}
Molar mass: 155.16 g·mol^{−1}
Systematic name:
2-amino-3-(3H-imidazol-4-yl)propanoic acid
Abbreviations: H, His
Synonyms:
Imidazole alanine
({S/D})-α-amino-1H-imidazole-4-propanoic acid
4-(2-amino-2-carboxyethyl)imidazole
α-amino-1H-imidazole-4-propionic acid
α-amino-4-imidazolepropionic acid
Anti-rheuma
C00768
Glyoxaline-5-alanine
Database data
SMILES: C1=C(NC=N1)CC(C(=O)O)N
InChI=1/C6H9N3O2/c7-5(6(10)11)1-4-2-8-3-9-4/h2-3,5H,1,7H2,(H,8,9)(H,10,11)/t5-/m{0/1}/s1/f/h9-10H

ATC: N/A	CAS: 351-50-8 (D), 71-00-1 (L)	DrugBank: N/A	EINECS: 206-513-8 (D) ^{a}, 200-745-3 (L) ^{a}	PubChem: 71083 (D) ^{a}, 6274 (L) ^{a}

Physical properties

Structure	Crystal data	Spectral data: UV-Vis / IR / NMR / MS: Masses of main fragments: GMD MS Spectrum

Phase behavior	Solid properties T_{m}: 287 °C	Liquid properties	Gas properties

Hazard properties

MSDS N/A	Main hazards: N/A	NFPA 704	Flash point: N/A	RTECS number: N/A

Chemical properties

XLogP: -3.461	pI: 7.59	pK_{a}: 1.70; 6.04; 9.09	Tautomers: 2	Hydrogen bond: donor - 3; acceptor - 5

Pharmacological properties

This box:
- Except where noted otherwise, data relate to Standard temperature and pressure.
- Reliability of data general note.
