= Histidine ammonia-lyase =

Enzyme

HAL

Identifiers
- Aliases: HAL, HIS, HSTD, histidine ammonia-lyase, Histidine ammonia-lyase
- External IDs: OMIM: 609457; MGI: 96010; GeneCards: HAL
Enzyme activity
EC #	BRENDA	ExPASy	KEGG	MetaCyc
4.3.1.3	↗	↗	↗	↗

Gene location (Human)
Chr.	Chromosome 12 (human)
Band	12q23.1	Start	95,972,662 bp
Band	12q23.1	End	95,996,365 bp

Gene location (Mouse)
Chr.	Chromosome 10 (mouse)
Band	10 C2|10 48.49 cM	Start	93,324,630 bp
Band	10 C2|10 48.49 cM	End	93,355,166 bp
RNA expression pattern
Bgee	Human / Mouse (ortholog); Top expressed in: right lobe of liver; human penis; skin of thigh; vulva; blood; oocyte; skin of arm; monocyte; secondary oocyte; skin of abdomen / Top expressed in: morula; skin of external ear; left lobe of liver; lip; skin of back; lumbar spinal ganglion; calvaria; umbilical cord; spermatid; granulocyte; More reference expression data
BioGPS	n/a
Gene ontology
Molecular function	catalytic activity; lyase activity; ammonia-lyase activity; histidine ammonia-lyase activity
Cellular component	cytosol; cytoplasm
Biological process	histidine metabolic process; histidine catabolic process to glutamate and formate; histidine catabolic process to glutamate and formamide; histidine catabolic process
Sources:Amigo / QuickGO
Orthologs
Databases	NCBI: entry; OMA: entry
Species	Human	Mouse
Entrez	3034	15109
Ensembl	ENSG00000084110	ENSMUSG00000020017
UniProt	P42357	P35492
RefSeq (mRNA)	NM_001258333; NM_001258334; NM_002108	NM_010401
RefSeq (protein)	NP_001245262; NP_001245263; NP_002099	NP_034531
Location (UCSC)	Chr 12: 95.97 – 96 Mb	Chr 10: 93.32 – 93.36 Mb
PubMed search
- Wikidata
View/Edit Human	View/Edit Mouse

histidine ammonia-lyase
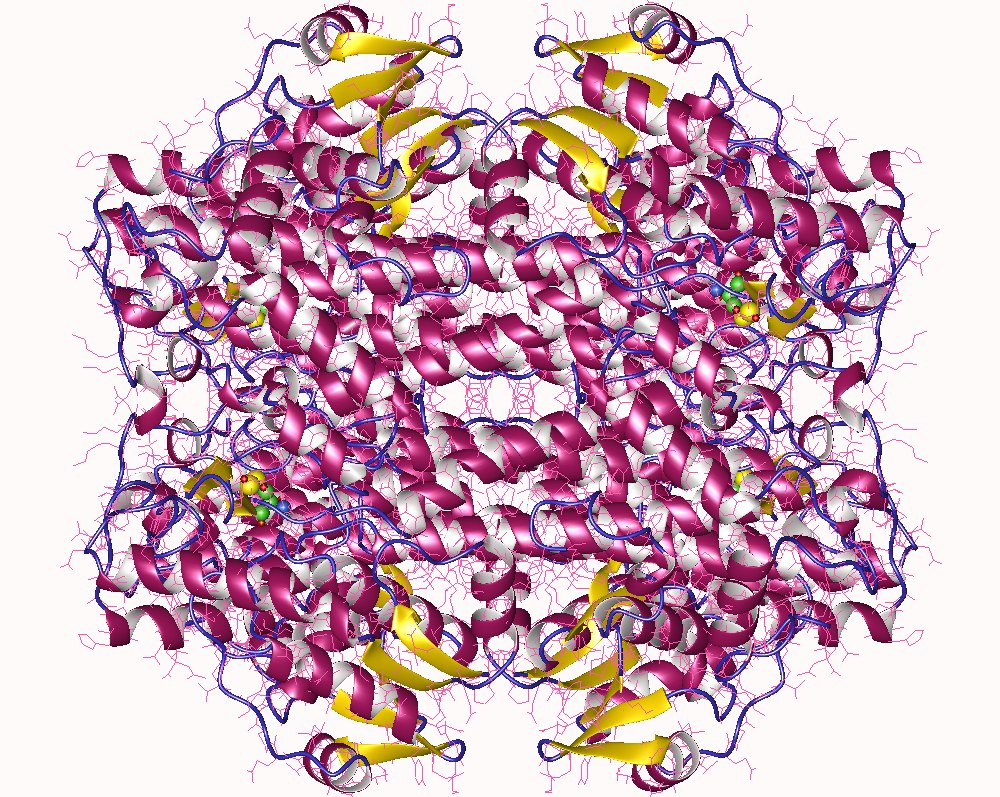
- Histidine ammonia-lyase homotetramer, Pseudomonas putida

Identifiers
- EC no.: 4.3.1.3
- CAS no.: 9013-75-6

Databases
- BRENDA: enzyme data
- ExPASy: NiceZyme view
- KEGG: enzyme entry
- MetaCyc: metabolic pathway
- Rhea: reactions
- PDB structures: RCSB PDB PDBe PDBsum
- Gene Ontology: AmiGO / QuickGO
Search
- PMC: articles
- PubMed: articles
- NCBI: proteins

Histidine ammonia-lyase (EC 4.3.1.3, histidase, histidinase) is an enzyme that in humans is encoded by the HAL gene. It converts histidine into ammonia and urocanic acid. Its systematic name is L-histidine ammonia-lyase (urocanate-forming).

== Function ==
Histidine ammonia-lyase is a cytosolic enzyme catalyzing the first reaction in histidine catabolism, the nonoxidative deamination of L-histidine to trans-urocanic acid. The reaction is catalyzed by 3,5-dihydro-5-methyldiene-4H-imidazol-4-one (MIO), an electrophilic cofactor which is formed autocatalytically by cyclization of the protein backbone of the enzyme.

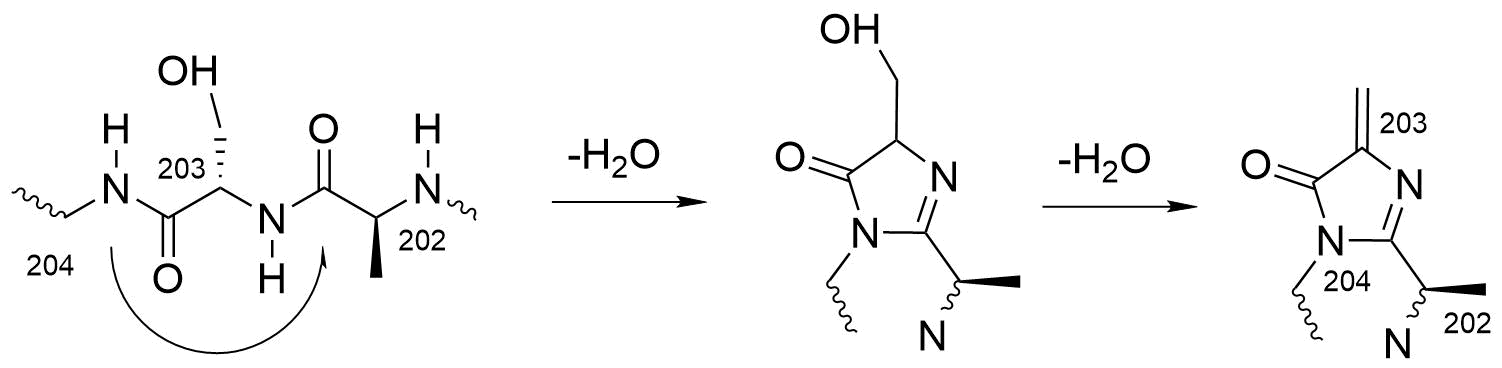
Proposed autocatalytic formation of MIO cofactor in another enzyme, phenylalanine ammonia-lyase, from the tripeptide Ala-Ser-Gly by two water elimination steps.

== Pathology ==
Mutations in the gene for histidase are associated with histidinemia and urocanic aciduria.

== See also ==
- Phenylalanine ammonia-lyase, another enzyme that contains the MIO cofactor
