= Formiminoglutamic acid =

Names
- IUPAC name N-(aminomethylidene)-L-glutamic acid
- Other names FIGLU

Identifiers
CAS Number	816-90-0
3D model (JSmol)	Interactive image
ChemSpider	388370
ECHA InfoCard	100.011.308
MeSH	Formiminoglutamic+acid
PubChem CID	909
UNII	YV703N7VOG
- InChI: InChI=1S/C6H10N2O4/c7-3-8-4(6(11)12)1-2-5(9)10/h3-4H,1-2H2,(H2,7,8)(H,9,10)(H,11,12) Key: NRXIKWMTVXPVEF-UHFFFAOYSA-N
- SMILES: C(CC(=O)O)C(C(=O)O)N=CN

Properties
Chemical formula	C_{6}H_{10}N_{2}O_{4}
Molar mass	174.156 g·mol^{−1}
- Except where otherwise noted, data are given for materials in their standard state (at 25 °C [77 °F], 100 kPa). verify (what is ?) Infobox references

Formiminoglutamic acid (FIGLU; conjugate base, formiminoglutamate) is an intermediate in the catabolism of L-histidine to L-glutamic acid. It thus is also a biomarker for intracellular levels of folate. The FIGLU test is used to identify vitamin B_{12} deficiency, folate deficiency, and liver failure or liver disease. It is elevated with folate trapping, where it is accompanied by decreased methylmalonic acid, increased folate and a decrease in homocysteine.

== See also ==
- Formiminotransferase cyclodeaminase
- Glutamate-1-semialdehyde
- Glutamic acid
- Imidazol-4-one-5-propionic acid
