= Urocanase =

UROC1

Identifiers
- Aliases: UROC1, HMFN0320, UROCD, urocanate hydratase 1
- External IDs: OMIM: 613012; MGI: 2385332; GeneCards: UROC1
Enzyme activity
| EC # | BRENDA | ExPASy | KEGG | MetaCyc |
|---|---|---|---|---|
| 4.2.1.49 | ↗ | ↗ | ↗ | ↗ |

Gene location (Human)
| Chr. | Chromosome 3 (human) |
| Band | 3q21.3 | Start | 126,481,166 bp |
| Band | 3q21.3 | End | 126,517,773 bp |

Gene location (Mouse)
| Chr. | Chromosome 6 (mouse) |
| Band | 6|6 D1 | Start | 90,310,266 bp |
| Band | 6|6 D1 | End | 90,341,533 bp |
RNA expression pattern
| Bgee | Human / Mouse (ortholog); Top expressed in: right lobe of liver; testicle; right uterine tube; olfactory zone of nasal mucosa; prefrontal cortex; gonad; lower limb muscles; muscle of leg; gastrocnemius muscle; Brodmann area 9 / Top expressed in: left lobe of liver; pyloric antrum; ankle; vastus lateralis muscle; human kidney; vestibular membrane of cochlear duct; right kidney; lacrimal gland; proximal tubule; septal nuclei; More reference expression data |
| BioGPS | n/a |
Gene ontology
| Molecular function | lyase activity; urocanate hydratase activity |
| Cellular component | cytosol |
| Biological process | histidine catabolic process; histidine metabolic process; histidine catabolic process to glutamate and formamide; histidine catabolic process to glutamate and formate |
Sources:Amigo / QuickGO
Orthologs
| Databases | NCBI: entry; OMA: entry |
| Species | Human | Mouse |
| Entrez | 131669 | 243537 |
| Ensembl | ENSG00000159650 | ENSMUSG00000034456 |
| UniProt | Q96N76 | Q8VC12 |
| RefSeq (mRNA) | NM_144639; NM_001165974 | NM_144940; NM_001347329 |
| RefSeq (protein) | NP_001159446; NP_653240 | NP_001334258; NP_659189 |
| Location (UCSC) | Chr 3: 126.48 – 126.52 Mb | Chr 6: 90.31 – 90.34 Mb |
| PubMed search |
- Wikidata
| View/Edit Human | View/Edit Mouse |

Urocanase
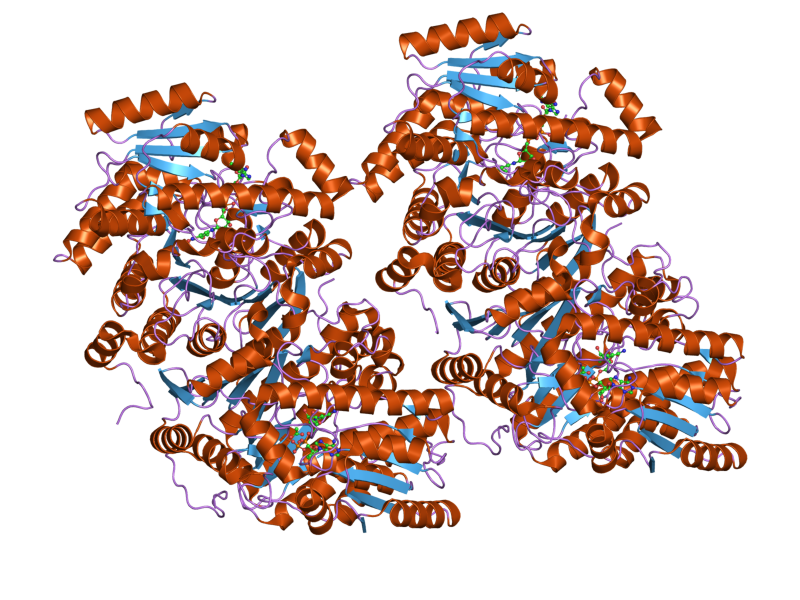
- Crystal structure of Urocanase from B. subtilis.

Identifiers
- Symbol: Urocanase
- Pfam: PF01175
- InterPro: IPR000193
- PROSITE: PDOC00947
Available protein structures:
- PDB: 1uwkB:2-556 1w1uA:2-556 1uwlB:2-556 IPR000193 PF01175 (ECOD; PDBsum)
- AlphaFold: IPR000193; PF01175

Urocanase (also known as imidazolonepropionate hydrolase or urocanate hydratase) is an enzyme (EC 4.2.1.49) that in humans is encoded by the gene UROC1. This enzyme catalyzes the second step in the degradation of histidine, the hydration of urocanic acid to imidazol-4-one-5-propionic acid.

The protein itself is composed of 676 amino acids which then fold, producing the final product which has two identical subunits, making the enzyme a homodimer.

To catalyze the hydrolysis of urocanate in the catabolic pathway of L-histidine the enzyme utilizes its two nicotinamide adenine dinucleotide (NAD+) groups. These act as electrophiles, attaching to the top carbon of the urocanate which leads to sigmatropic rearrangement of the urocanate molecule. This rearrangement allows for the addition of a water molecule, converting the urocanic acid into imidazol-4-one-5-propionic acid.

urocanic acid
H_{2}O
imidazol-4-one-5-propionic acid

Inherited deficiency of urocanase leads to elevated levels of urocanic acid in the urine, a condition known as urocanic aciduria.

Urocanase is found in some bacteria (gene hutU), in the liver of many vertebrates and has also been found in the plant Trifolium repens (white clover). Urocanase is a protein of about 60 Kd, it binds tightly to NAD^{+} and uses it as an electrophil cofactor. A conserved cysteine has been found to be important for the catalytic mechanism and could be involved in the binding of the NAD^{+}.
