= Histidine =

Chemical compound

- Structure of histidine

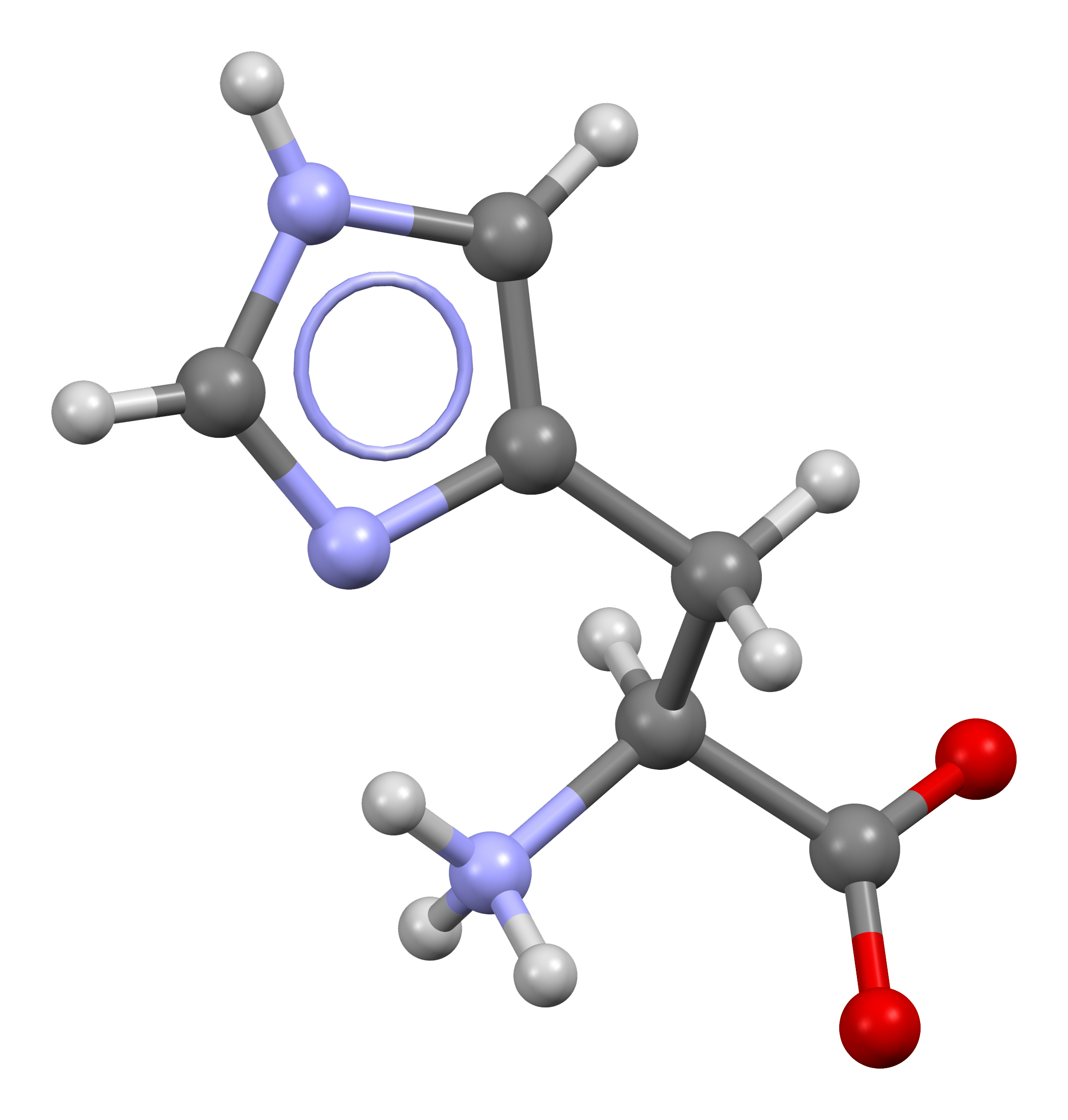
Ball-and-stick model (Zwitterion)
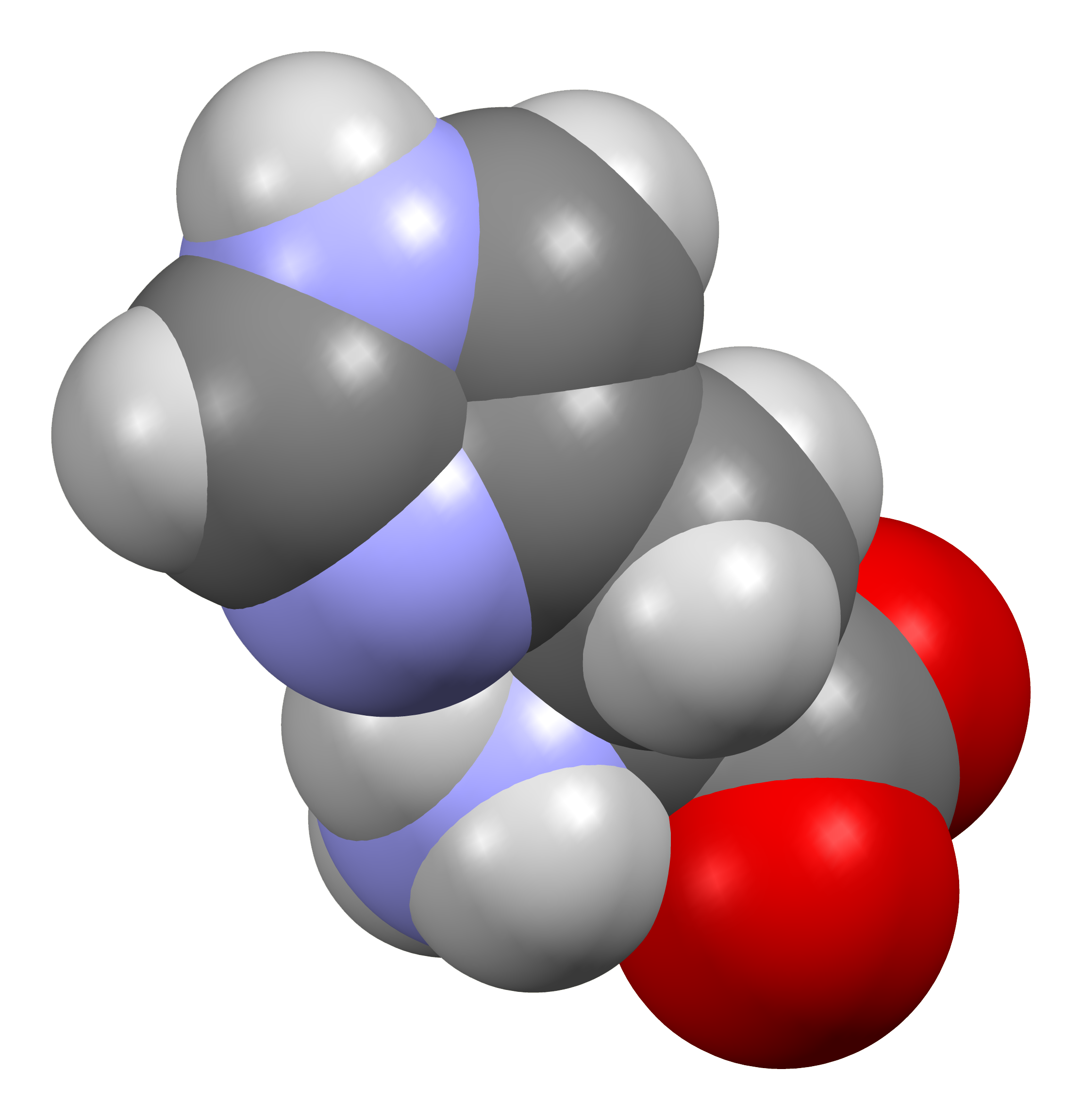
Space-filling model (Zwitterion)

Names
- IUPAC name Histidine
- Systematic IUPAC name 2-Amino-3-(1H-imidazol-4-yl)propanoic acid

Identifiers
CAS Number	71-00-1
3D model (JSmol)	Interactive image; Zwitterion: Interactive image; Protonated zwitterion: Interactive image
Beilstein Reference	84088
ChEBI	CHEBI:15971
ChEMBL	ChEMBL17962
ChemSpider	6038
DrugBank	DB00117
ECHA InfoCard	100.000.678
EC Number	200-745-3
Gmelin Reference	83042
IUPHAR/BPS	3310
KEGG	D00032
PubChem CID	6274
UNII	4QD397987E
CompTox Dashboard (EPA)	DTXSID9023126
- InChI: InChI=1S/C6H9N3O2/c7-5(6(10)11)1-4-2-8-3-9-4/h2-3,5H,1,7H2,(H,8,9)(H,10,11)/t5-/m0/s1 Key: HNDVDQJCIGZPNO-YFKPBYRVSA-N
- SMILES: O=C([C@H](CC1=CNC=N1)N)O; Zwitterion: O=C([C@H](CC1=CNC=N1)[NH3+])[O-]; Protonated zwitterion: O=C([C@H](CC1=CNC=[NH1+]1)[NH3+])[O-]

Properties
Chemical formula	C_{6}H_{9}N_{3}O_{2}
Molar mass	155.157 g·mol^{−1}
Solubility in water	45.6mg/mL

Hazards
NFPA 704 (fire diamond)	1 1 0

Supplementary data page
- Histidine (data page)
- Except where otherwise noted, data are given for materials in their standard state (at 25 °C [77 °F], 100 kPa). Infobox references

Histidine ball and stick model spinning

Histidine or histidin (symbol His or H) is an essential amino acid that is used in the biosynthesis of proteins. It contains an α-amino group (which is in the protonated –NH_{3}^{+} form under biological conditions), a carboxylic acid group (which is in the deprotonated –COO^{−} form under biological conditions), and an imidazole side chain (which is partially protonated), classifying it as a positively charged amino acid at physiological pH. Initially thought essential only for infants, it has now been shown in longer-term studies to be essential for adults also. It is encoded by the codons CAU and CAC.

Histidine was first isolated by Albrecht Kossel and Sven Gustaf Hedin in 1896. The name stems from its discovery in tissue, from ἱστός histós "tissue". It is also a precursor to histamine, a vital inflammatory agent in immune responses. The acyl radical is histidyl.

== Properties of the imidazole side chain ==
At neutral or physiological pH, the imidazole side chain is neutral. The imidazole side chain in histidine has a pK_{a} of approximately 6.0. Thus, below a pH of 6, the imidazole ring is mostly protonated and carries a positive +1 charge (as described by the Henderson–Hasselbalch equation). The resulting imidazolium ring bears two NH bonds and has a positive charge. The positive charge is equally distributed between both nitrogen atoms and can be represented with two equally important resonance structures. Sometimes, the symbol Hip is used for this protonated form instead of the usual His. Above pH 6, one of the two protons is lost. The remaining proton of the imidazole ring can reside on either nitrogen atom, giving rise to what are known as the N3-H or N1-H tautomers. In the N1-H tautomer, the NH group is nearer the backbone. These neutral tautomers, also referred to as N_{ε} (or N_{τ}, tau meaning tele — far) and N_{δ} (or N_{π}, pi meaning pros — near), are sometimes referred to with symbols Hie and Hid, respectively. The imidazole/imidazolium ring of histidine is aromatic at all pH values.

The acid-base properties of the imidazole side chain are relevant to the catalytic mechanism of many enzymes. In catalytic triads, the basic nitrogen of histidine abstracts a proton from serine, threonine, or cysteine to activate it as a nucleophile. In a histidine proton shuttle, histidine is used to quickly shuttle protons. It can do this by abstracting a proton with its basic nitrogen to make a positively charged intermediate and then use another molecule, a buffer, to extract the proton from its acidic nitrogen. In carbonic anhydrases, a histidine proton shuttle is utilized to rapidly shuttle protons away from a zinc-bound water molecule to quickly regenerate the active form of the enzyme. In helices E and F of hemoglobin, histidine influences binding of dioxygen as well as carbon monoxide. This interaction enhances the affinity of Fe(II) for O_{2} but destabilizes the binding of CO, which binds only 200 times stronger in hemoglobin, compared to 20,000 times stronger in free heme.

The tautomerism and acid-base properties of the imidazole side chain has been characterized by ^{15}N NMR spectroscopy. The two ^{15}N chemical shifts are similar (about 200 ppm, relative to nitric acid on the sigma scale, on which increased shielding corresponds to increased chemical shift). NMR spectral measurements shows that the chemical shift of N1-H drops slightly, whereas the chemical shift of N3-H drops considerably (about 190 vs. 145 ppm). This change indicates that the N1-H tautomer is preferred, possibly due to hydrogen bonding to the neighboring ammonium. The shielding at N3 is substantially reduced due to the second-order paramagnetic effect, which involves a symmetry-allowed interaction between the nitrogen lone pair and the excited π* states of the aromatic ring. At pH > 9, the chemical shifts of N1 and N3 are approximately 185 and 170 ppm.

=== Ligand ===
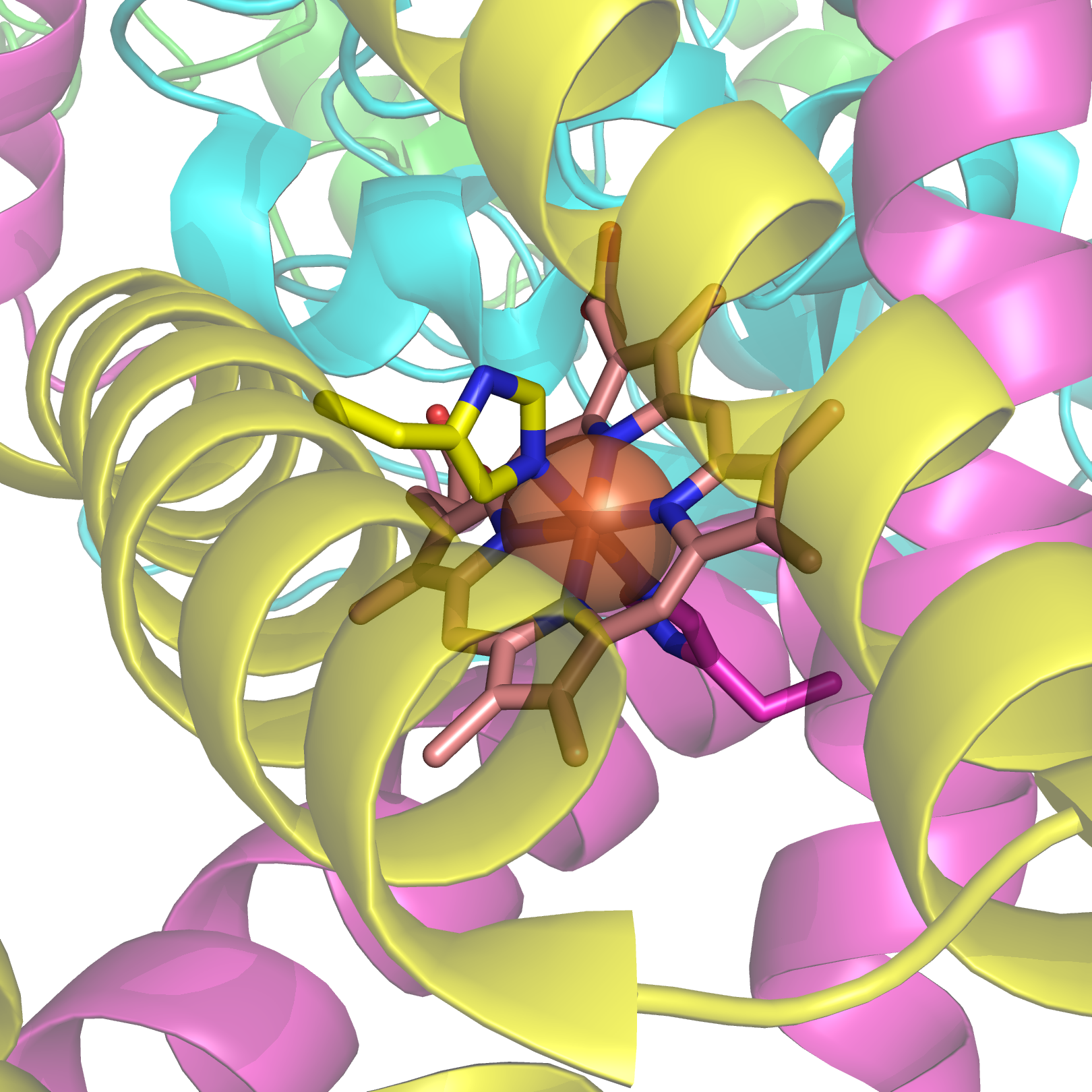
The histidine-bound heme group of succinate dehydrogenase, an electron carrier in the mitochondrial electron transfer chain. The large semi-transparent sphere indicates the location of the iron ion. From PDB: 1YQ3.

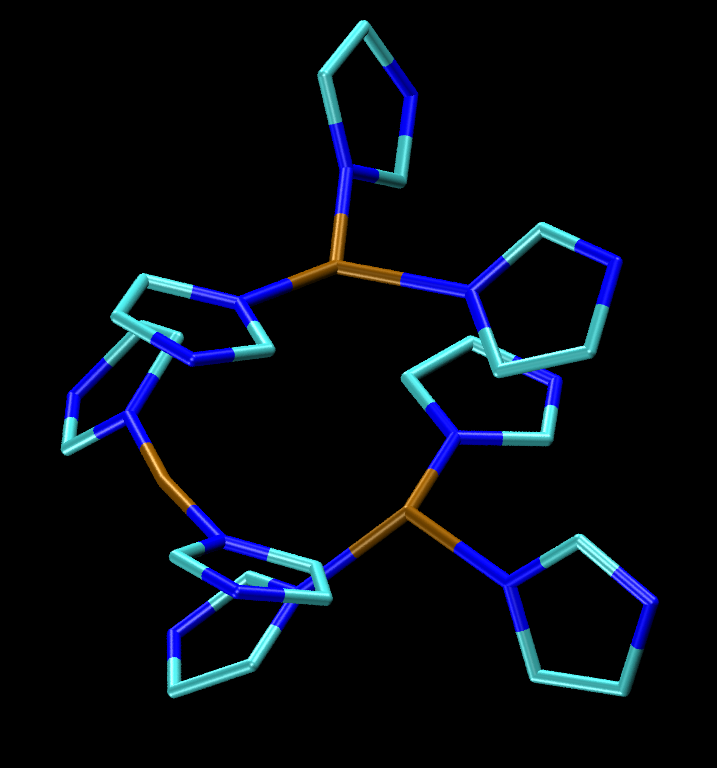
The tricopper site found in many laccases. Notice that each copper center is bound to the imidazole sidechains of histidine (color code: copper is brown, nitrogen is blue).

Histidine forms complexes with many metal ions. The imidazole sidechain of the histidine residue commonly serves as a ligand in metalloproteins. One example is the axial base attached to Fe in myoglobin and hemoglobin. Poly-histidine tags (of six or more consecutive H residues) are utilized for protein purification by binding to columns with nickel or cobalt, with micromolar affinity. Natural poly-histidine peptides, found in the venom of the viper Atheris squamigera have been shown to bind Zn(II), Ni(II) and Cu(II) and affect the function of venom metalloproteases.

N-terminal histidines are known to function as bidentate ligands, with a metal (generally copper) bound to both the amine of the N-terminus and the N_{δ} of the histidine; the N_{ε} is often methylated. Although recently discovered, this "histidine brace" motif is critical in biogeochemical cycles: it functions as the active site of lytic polysaccharide monooxygenases (LPMOs), which break down unreactive polysaccharides such as cellulose. It is proposed that the evolution of these enzymes in fungi corresponds to the first widespread ability to decompose woody plant mass, leading to the end of the Carboniferous era and its mass accumulation of coal deposits.

== Metabolism ==
=== Biosynthesis ===
Histidine Biosynthesis Pathway Eight different enzymes can catalyze ten reactions. In this image, His4 catalyzes four different reactions in the pathway.

l-Histidine is an essential amino acid that is not synthesized de novo in humans. Humans and other animals must ingest histidine or histidine-containing proteins. The biosynthesis of histidine has been widely studied in prokaryotes such as E. coli. Histidine synthesis in E. coli involves eight gene products (His1, 2, 3, 4, 5, 6, 7, and 8) and it occurs in ten steps. This is possible because a single gene product has the ability to catalyze more than one reaction. For example, as shown in the pathway, His4 catalyzes four different steps in the pathway.

Histidine is synthesized from phosphoribosyl pyrophosphate (PRPP), which is made from ribose-5-phosphate by ribose-phosphate diphosphokinase in the pentose phosphate pathway. The first reaction of histidine biosynthesis is the condensation of PRPP and adenosine triphosphate (ATP) by the enzyme ATP-phosphoribosyl transferase. ATP-phosphoribosyl transferase is indicated by His1 in the image. His4 gene product then hydrolyzes the product of the condensation, phosphoribosyl-ATP, producing phosphoribosyl-AMP (PRAMP), which is an irreversible step. His4 then catalyzes the formation of phosphoribosylformiminoAICAR-phosphate, which is then converted to phosphoribulosylformimino-AICAR-P by the His6 gene product. His7 splits phosphoribulosylformimino-AICAR-P to form d-erythro-imidazole-glycerol-phosphate. After, His3 forms imidazole acetol-phosphate releasing water. His5 then makes l-histidinol-phosphate, which is then hydrolyzed by His2 making histidinol. His4 catalyzes the oxidation of l-histidinol to form l-histidinal, an amino aldehyde. In the last step, l-histidinal is converted to l-histidine.

The histidine biosynthesis pathway has been studied in the fungus Neurospora crassa, and a gene (His-3) encoding a multienzyme complex was found that was similar to the His4 gene of the bacterium E. coli. A genetic study of N. crassa histidine mutants indicated that the individual activities of the multienzyme complex occur in discrete, contiguous sections of the His-3 genetic map, suggesting that the different activities of the multienzyme complex are encoded separately from each other. However, mutants were also found that lacked all three activities simultaneously, suggesting that some mutations cause loss of function of the complex as a whole.

Like animals and microorganisms, plants need histidine for their growth and development. But unlike animals, microorganisms and plants can synthesize histidine. Both synthesize histidine from the biochemical intermediate phosphoribosyl pyrophosphate. In general, the histidine biosynthesis is very similar in plants and microorganisms.

==== Regulation of biosynthesis ====
This pathway requires energy in order to occur; therefore, the presence of ATP activates the first enzyme of the pathway, ATP-phosphoribosyl transferase (shown as His1 in the image on the right). ATP-phosphoribosyl transferase is the rate determining enzyme, which is regulated through feedback inhibition, meaning that it is inhibited in the presence of the product, histidine.

=== Degradation ===
Histidine can be metabolized into glutamate, which is readily metabolized into AKG (alpha-ketoglutarate), making histidine one of the amino acids whose metabolites can become citric acid cycle intermediates. The process requires several steps. In prokaryotes, histidine first undergoes deamination, the removal of its amino group by the emzyme histidase. This step produces ammonia and urocanic acid (urocanate). The enzyme urocanase then converts urocanic acid into imidazolonepropionate (4-imidazolone-5-propionate). The enzyme imidazolonepropionase then converts imidazolonepropionate into formiminoglutamate (FIGLU). The enzyme formimidoyltransferase cyclodeaminase removes the formimino group (which is transferred to tetrahydrofolate), leaving behind a glutamate molecule. Glutamate can then be deaminated by glutamate dehydrogenase or transaminated to form α-ketoglutarate.

=== Conversion to other biologically active amines ===
- The histidine amino acid is a precursor for histamine, an amine produced in the body necessary for inflammation.
- The enzyme histidine ammonia-lyase converts histidine into ammonia and urocanic acid. A deficiency in this enzyme is present in the rare metabolic disorder histidinemia, producing urocanic aciduria as a key diagnostic finding.
- Histidine can be converted to 3-methylhistidine, which serves as a biomarker for skeletal muscle damage, by certain methyltransferase enzymes.
- Histidine is also a precursor for carnosine biosynthesis, which is a dipeptide found in skeletal muscle.
- In Actinomycetota and filamentous fungi, such as Neurospora crassa, histidine can be converted into the antioxidant ergothioneine.

Conversion of histidine to histamine by histidine decarboxylase

== Requirements ==
The Food and Nutrition Board (FNB) of the U.S. Institute of Medicine set Recommended Dietary Allowances (RDAs) for essential amino acids in 2002. For histidine, for adults 19 years and older, 14 mg/kg body weight/day. Supplemental histidine is being investigated for use in a variety of different conditions, including neurological disorders, atopic dermatitis, metabolic syndrome, diabetes, uraemic anaemia, ulcers, inflammatory bowel diseases, malignancies, and muscle performance during strenuous exercise.

== Medical uses ==
Histidine’s role in skin health has attracted research interest because the amino acid is a precursor to filaggrin, a structural protein that helps maintain the integrity of the skin’s outer barrier. Filaggrin is rich in histidine and, when broken down, contributes to the natural moisturizing factor that helps retain moisture and supports barrier function. Clinical studies suggest that oral L-histidine supplementation can increase filaggrin processing and improve skin barrier function, with corresponding reductions in the severity of atopic dermatitis (eczema) compared with placebo, potentially offering a safe, nonsteroidal adjunct to traditional therapies.

In the skincare industry, biotechnology companies such as Codex Labs— a dermatology and firm developing skin-gut-brain-biome solutions for conditions including eczema — have incorporated histidine-containing formulations into products and supplements aimed at strengthening the skin barrier and supporting sensitive skin, reflecting growing interest in histidine’s functional importance beyond its canonical metabolic roles.

== See also ==
- Carnosinemia
- Beta-Alanine
- Diphthamide
- Imidazole propionate
- Pauly reaction
