= Aminopeptidase Y =

Class of enzymes

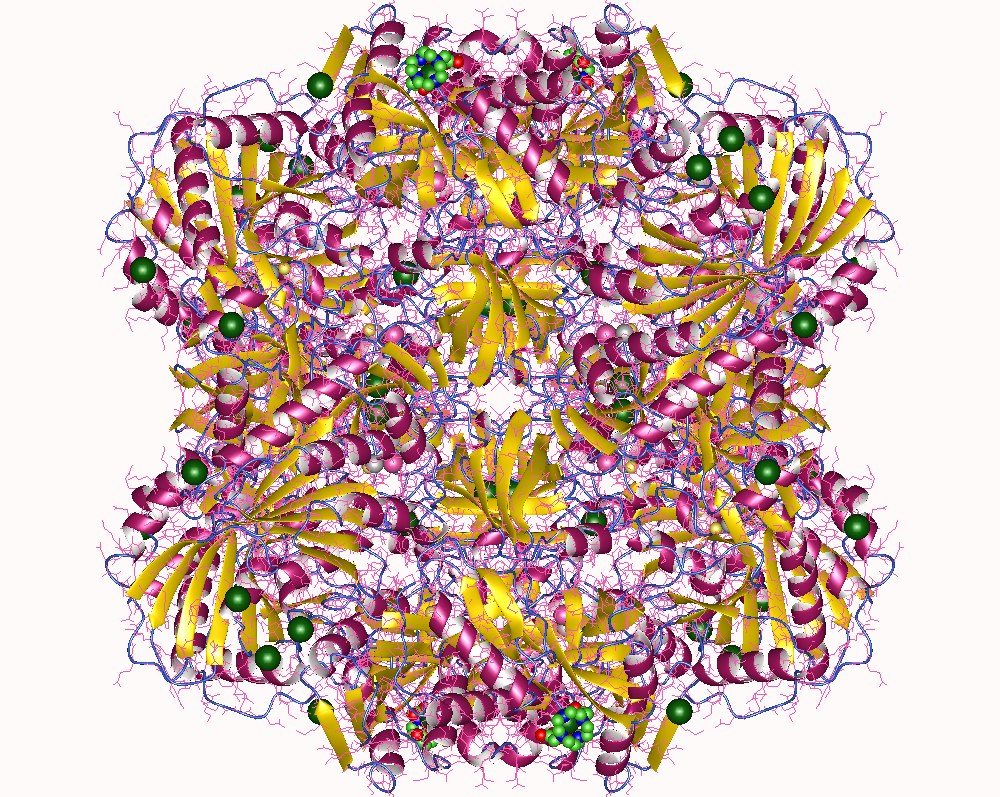
- Lysyl aminopeptidase dodekamer, Pyrococcus furiosus

Identifiers
- EC no.: 3.4.11.15
- CAS no.: 114796-97-3

Databases
- IntEnz: IntEnz view
- BRENDA: BRENDA entry
- ExPASy: NiceZyme view
- KEGG: KEGG entry
- MetaCyc: metabolic pathway
- PRIAM: profile
- PDB structures: RCSB PDB PDBe PDBsum
Search
- PMC: articles
- PubMed: articles
- NCBI: proteins

Aminopeptidase Y (EC 3.4.11.15, aminopeptidase Co, aminopeptidase (cobalt-activated), lysyl aminopeptidase) is an enzyme. This enzyme catalyses the following chemical reaction

Preferentially, release of N-terminal lysine

This enzyme requires Co^{2+}. It is inhibited by Zn^{2+} and Mn^{2+}.
