= Bis(2-ethylhexyl)phthalate esterase =

bis(2-ethylhexyl)phthalate esterase

Identifiers
- EC no.: 3.1.1.60
- CAS no.: 92480-02-9

Databases
- IntEnz: IntEnz view
- BRENDA: BRENDA entry
- ExPASy: NiceZyme view
- KEGG: KEGG entry
- MetaCyc: metabolic pathway
- PRIAM: profile
- PDB structures: RCSB PDB PDBe PDBsum
- Gene Ontology: AmiGO / QuickGO
Search
- PMC: articles
- PubMed: articles
- NCBI: proteins

The enzyme bis(2-ethylhexyl)phthalate esterase (EC 3.1.1.60) catalyzes the reaction

bis(2-ethylhexyl)phthalate + H_{2}O $\rightleftharpoons$ 2-ethylhexyl phthalate + 2-ethylhexan-1-ol

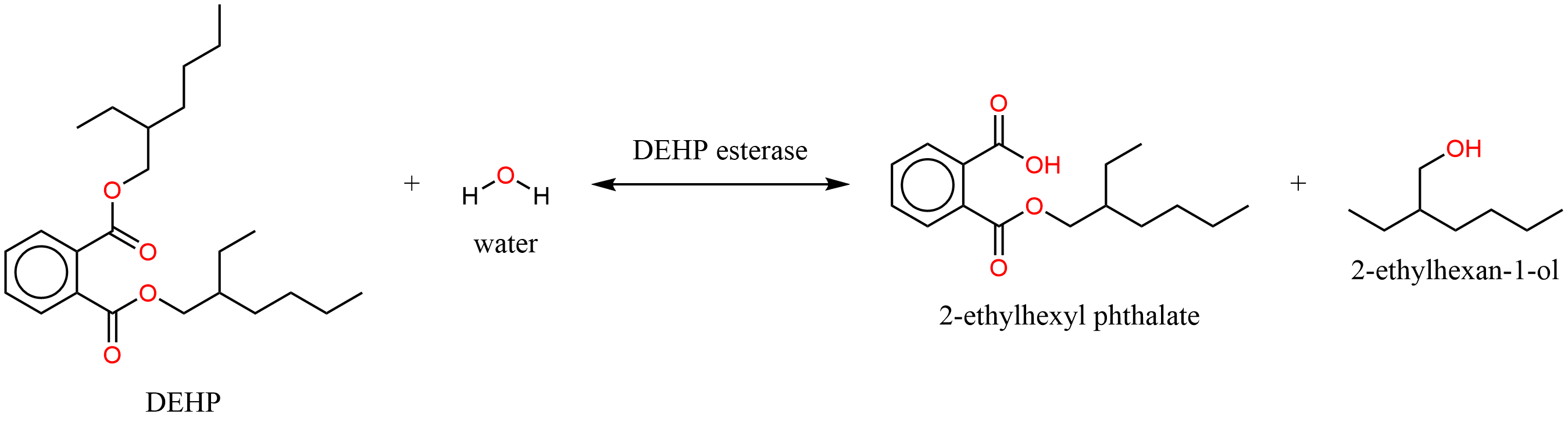
Action of the enzyme.

This enzyme belongs to the family of hydrolases, specifically those acting on carboxylic ester bonds. The systematic name is bis(2-ethylhexyl)phthalate acylhydrolase. This enzyme is also called DEHP esterase.
