= 2-haloalkanoic acid dehalogenase =

2-haloalkanoic acid dehalogenase may refer to:

- 2-haloacid dehalogenase (configuration-inverting), an enzyme
- 2-haloacid dehalogenase (configuration-retaining), an enzyme
