= 2-haloacid dehalogenase (configuration-inverting) =

Class of enzymes

Identifiers
- EC no.: 3.8.1.10

Databases
- IntEnz: IntEnz view
- BRENDA: BRENDA entry
- ExPASy: NiceZyme view
- KEGG: KEGG entry
- MetaCyc: metabolic pathway
- PRIAM: profile
- PDB structures: RCSB PDB PDBe PDBsum
Search
- PMC: articles
- PubMed: articles
- NCBI: proteins

2-haloacid dehalogenase (configuration-inverting) (EC 3.8.1.10, 2-haloalkanoic acid dehalogenase, 2-haloalkanoid acid halidohydrolase, DL-2-haloacid dehalogenase, DL-2-haloacid dehalogenase (inversion of configuration), DL-2-haloacid halidohydrolase (inversion of configuration), DL-DEXi, (R,S)-2-haloacid dehalogenase (configuration-inverting)) is an enzyme with systematic name (S)-2-haloacid dehalogenase (configuration-inverting). This enzyme catalyses the following chemical reaction

(1) (S)-2-haloacid + H_{2}O $\rightleftharpoons$ (R)-2-hydroxyacid + halide
(2) (R)-2-haloacid + H_{2}O $\rightleftharpoons$ (S)-2-hydroxyacid + halide

This enzyme dehalogenates both (S)- and (R)-2-haloalkanoic acids.
