= 2-haloacid dehalogenase (configuration-retaining) =

Class of enzymes

Identifiers
- EC no.: 3.8.1.11

Databases
- IntEnz: IntEnz view
- BRENDA: BRENDA entry
- ExPASy: NiceZyme view
- KEGG: KEGG entry
- MetaCyc: metabolic pathway
- PRIAM: profile
- PDB structures: RCSB PDB PDBe PDBsum
Search
- PMC: articles
- PubMed: articles
- NCBI: proteins

2-haloacid dehalogenase (configuration-retaining) (EC 3.8.1.11, 2-haloalkanoic acid dehalogenase, 2-haloalkanoid acid halidohydrolase, DL-2-haloacid dehalogenase, DL-DEXr) is an enzyme with systematic name (S)-2-haloacid dehalogenase (configuration-retaining). This enzyme catalyses the following chemical reaction

(1) (S)-2-haloacid + H_{2}O $\rightleftharpoons$ (S)-2-hydroxyacid + halide
(2) (R)-2-haloacid + H_{2}O $\rightleftharpoons$ (R)-2-hydroxyacid + halide

Dehalogenates both (S)- and (R)-2-haloalkanoic acids to the corresponding (S)- and (R)-hydroxyalkanoic acids.
