= Glutaryl-7-aminocephalosporanic-acid acylase =

Class of enzymes

Identifiers
- EC no.: 3.5.1.93

Databases
- BRENDA: enzyme data
- ExPASy: NiceZyme view
- KEGG: enzyme entry
- MetaCyc: metabolic pathway
- Rhea: reactions
- PDB structures: RCSB PDB PDBe PDBsum
Search
- PMC: articles
- PubMed: articles
- NCBI: proteins

Glutaryl-7-aminocephalosporanic-acid acylase (EC 3.5.1.93) is an enzyme characterised from a Pseudomonas species that catalyzes the hydrolysis of the cephalosporin antibiotic, glutaryl-7-aminocephalosporanic acid, to the parent 7-ACA and glutaric acid:

glutaryl-7-aminocephalosporanic acid
H_{2}O
7-ACA
+
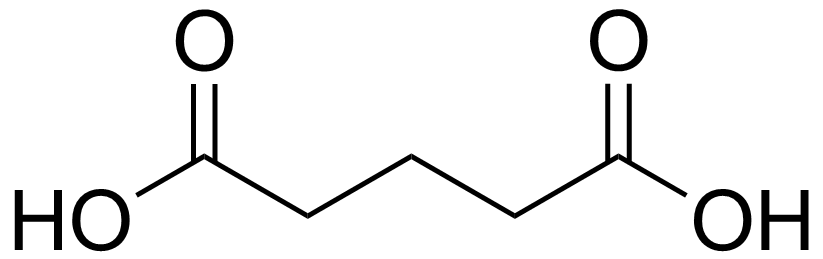
glutaric acid

The structure of several of these enzymes have been determined. An immobilised version of the enzyme has been produced as a means of making 7-ACA for the manufacture of other derivatives.

This enzyme is a hydrolase, one acting on carbon-nitrogen bonds other than peptide bonds, specifically in linear amides. The systematic name of this enzyme class is (7R)-7-(4-carboxybutanamido)cephalosporanate amidohydrolase. Other names in use include 7beta-(4-carboxybutanamido)cephalosporanic acid acylase, cephalosporin C acylase, glutaryl-7-ACA acylase, CA, GCA, GA, cephalosporin acylase, glutaryl-7-aminocephalosporanic acid acylase, and GL-7-ACA acylase.
