= N-acetylglucosaminylphosphatidylinositol deacetylase =

Identifiers
- EC no.: 3.5.1.89

Databases
- IntEnz: IntEnz view
- BRENDA: BRENDA entry
- ExPASy: NiceZyme view
- KEGG: KEGG entry
- MetaCyc: metabolic pathway
- PRIAM: profile
- PDB structures: RCSB PDB PDBe PDBsum
- Gene Ontology: AmiGO / QuickGO
Search
- PMC: articles
- PubMed: articles
- NCBI: proteins

In enzymology, a N-acetylglucosaminylphosphatidylinositol deacetylase (EC 3.5.1.89) is an enzyme that catalyzes the chemical reaction

6-(N-acetyl-alpha-D-glucosaminyl)-1-phosphatidyl-1D-myo-inositol + H_{2}O $\rightleftharpoons$ 6-(alpha-D-glucosaminyl)-1-phosphatidyl-1D-myo-inositol + acetate

Thus, the two substrates of this enzyme are 6-(N-acetyl-alpha-D-glucosaminyl)-1-phosphatidyl-1D-myo-inositol and H_{2}O, whereas its two products are 6-(alpha-D-glucosaminyl)-1-phosphatidyl-1D-myo-inositol and acetate.

This enzyme belongs to the family of hydrolases, those acting on carbon-nitrogen bonds other than peptide bonds, specifically in linear amides. The systematic name of this enzyme class is 6-(N-acetyl-alpha-D-glucosaminyl)-1-phosphatidyl-1D-myo-inositol acetylhydrolase. Other names in common use include N-acetyl-D-glucosaminylphosphatidylinositol acetylhydrolase, N-acetylglucosaminylphosphatidylinositol de-N-acetylase, GlcNAc-PI de-N-acetylase, GlcNAc-PI deacetylase, and acetylglucosaminylphosphatidylinositol deacetylase. This enzyme participates in 3 metabolic pathways: glycosylphosphatidylinositol(gpi)-anchor, and glycan structures - biosynthesis 2.
