= Beta-apiosyl-beta-glucosidase =

Identifiers
- EC no.: 3.2.1.161

Databases
- IntEnz: IntEnz view
- BRENDA: BRENDA entry
- ExPASy: NiceZyme view
- KEGG: KEGG entry
- MetaCyc: metabolic pathway
- PRIAM: profile
- PDB structures: RCSB PDB PDBe PDBsum
Search
- PMC: articles
- PubMed: articles
- NCBI: proteins

In enzymology, a beta-apiosyl-beta-glucosidase (EC 3.2.1.161) is an enzyme that catalyzes the chemical reaction

7-[beta-D-apiofuranosyl-(1->6)-beta-D-glucopyranosyloxy]isoflavonoid + H_{2}O $\rightleftharpoons$ a 7-hydroxyisoflavonoid + beta-D-apiofuranosyl-(1->6)-D-glucose

The 3 substrates of this enzyme are [[7-[beta-D-apiofuranosyl-(1->6)-beta-D-]], [[glucopyranosyloxy]isoflavonoid]], and H_{2}O, whereas its two products are 7-hydroxyisoflavonoid and [[beta-D-apiofuranosyl-(1->6)-D-glucose]].

This enzyme belongs to the family of hydrolases, specifically those glycosidases that hydrolyse O- and S-glycosyl compounds. The systematic name of this enzyme class is 7-[beta-D-apiofuranosyl-(1->6)-beta-D-glucopyranosyloxy]isoflavonoid beta-D-apiofuranosyl-(1->6)-D-glucohydrolase. Other names in common use include isoflavonoid-7-O-beta[D-apiosyl-(1->6)-beta-D-glucoside], disaccharidase, isoflavonoid 7-O-beta-apiosyl-glucoside beta-glucosidase, and furcatin hydrolase.
