= 2-(hydroxymethyl)-3-(acetamidomethylene)succinate hydrolase =

Class of enzymes

Identifiers
- EC no.: 3.5.1.66
- CAS no.: 95829-26-8

Databases
- IntEnz: IntEnz view
- BRENDA: BRENDA entry
- ExPASy: NiceZyme view
- KEGG: KEGG entry
- MetaCyc: metabolic pathway
- PRIAM: profile
- PDB structures: RCSB PDB PDBe PDBsum
- Gene Ontology: AmiGO / QuickGO
Search
- PMC: articles
- PubMed: articles
- NCBI: proteins

In enzymology, a 2-(hydroxymethyl)-3-(acetamidomethylene)succinate hydrolase (EC 3.5.1.66) is an enzyme that catalyzes the chemical reaction

2-(hydroxymethyl)-3-(acetamidomethylene)succinate + 2 H_{2}O $\rightleftharpoons$ acetate + 2-(hydroxymethyl)-4-oxobutanoate + NH_{3} + CO_{2}

Thus, the two substrates of this enzyme are 2-(hydroxymethyl)-3-(acetamidomethylene)succinate and H_{2}O, whereas its 4 products are acetate, 2-(hydroxymethyl)-4-oxobutanoate, NH_{3}, and CO_{2}.

This enzyme belongs to the family of hydrolases, those acting on carbon-nitrogen bonds other than peptide bonds, specifically in linear amides. The systematic name of this enzyme class is 2-(hydroxymethyl)-3-(acetamidomethylene)succinate amidohydrolase (deaminating, decarboxylating). Other names in common use include compound B hydrolase, alpha-hydroxymethyl-alpha'-(N-acetylaminomethylene)succinic acid, and hydrolase. This enzyme participates in vitamin B_{6} metabolism.
