= Phosphatidylinositol-4,5-bisphosphate 4-phosphatase =

Identifiers
- EC no.: 3.1.3.78

Databases
- IntEnz: IntEnz view
- BRENDA: BRENDA entry
- ExPASy: NiceZyme view
- KEGG: KEGG entry
- MetaCyc: metabolic pathway
- PRIAM: profile
- PDB structures: RCSB PDB PDBe PDBsum
Search
- PMC: articles
- PubMed: articles
- NCBI: proteins

Phosphatidylinositol-4,5-bisphosphate 4-phosphatase (EC 3.1.3.78, phosphatidylinositol-4,5-bisphosphate 4-phosphatase I, phosphatidylinositol-4,5-bisphosphate 4-phosphatase II, type I PtdIns-4,5-P_{2} 4-Ptase, type II PtdIns-4,5-P_{2} 4-Ptase, IpgD, PtdIns-4,5-P_{2} 4-phosphatase type I, PtdIns-4,5-P_{2} 4-phosphatase type II, type I phosphatidylinositol-4,5-bisphosphate 4-phosphatase, type 1 4-phosphatase) is an enzyme with systematic name 1-phosphatidyl-1D-myo-inositol-4,5-bisphosphate 4-phosphohydrolase. This enzyme catalyses the following chemical reaction

1-phosphatidyl-1D-myo-inositol 4,5-bisphosphate + H_{2}O $\rightleftharpoons$ 1-phosphatidyl-1D-myo-inositol 5-phosphate + phosphate

This enzyme participates in one of the mammalian pathways for degradation of 1-phosphatidyl-1D-myo-inositol 4,5-bisphosphate [PtdIns(4,5)P_{2}].
