= N-acetylglucosamine-1-phosphodiester alpha-N-acetylglucosaminidase =

N-acetylglucosamine-1-phosphodiester α-N-acetylglucosaminidase

Identifiers
- EC no.: 3.1.4.45
- CAS no.: 75788-84-0

Databases
- IntEnz: IntEnz view
- BRENDA: BRENDA entry
- ExPASy: NiceZyme view
- KEGG: KEGG entry
- MetaCyc: metabolic pathway
- PRIAM: profile
- PDB structures: RCSB PDB PDBe PDBsum
- Gene Ontology: AmiGO / QuickGO
Search
- PMC: articles
- PubMed: articles
- NCBI: proteins

The enzyme N-acetylglucosamine-1-phosphodiester α-N-acetylglucosaminidase (EC 3.1.4.45) catalyzes the reaction

glycoprotein N-acetyl-D-glucosaminyl-phospho-D-mannose + H_{2}O $\rightleftharpoons$ N-acetyl-D-glucosamine + glycoprotein phospho-D-mannose

This enzyme belongs to the family of hydrolases, specifically those acting on phosphoric diester bonds. The systematic name is glycoprotein-N-acetyl-D-glucosaminyl-phospho-D-mannose N-acetyl-D-glucosaminylphosphohydrolase. Other names in common use include α-N-acetylglucosaminyl phosphodiesterase, lysosomal α-N-acetylglucosaminidase, phosphodiester glycosidase, α-N-acetyl-D-glucosamine-1-phosphodiester, N-acetylglucosaminidase, 2-acetamido-2-deoxy-α-D-glucose 1-phosphodiester, and acetamidodeoxyglucohydrolase.
