= Long-chain-fatty-acyl-glutamate deacylase =

long-chain-fatty-acyl-glutamate deacylase

Identifiers
- EC no.: 3.5.1.55
- CAS no.: 82249-69-2

Databases
- IntEnz: IntEnz view
- BRENDA: BRENDA entry
- ExPASy: NiceZyme view
- KEGG: KEGG entry
- MetaCyc: metabolic pathway
- PRIAM: profile
- PDB structures: RCSB PDB PDBe PDBsum
- Gene Ontology: AmiGO / QuickGO
Search
- PMC: articles
- PubMed: articles
- NCBI: proteins

In enzymology, a long-chain-fatty-acyl-glutamate deacylase (EC 3.5.1.55) is an enzyme that catalyzes the chemical reaction

N-long-chain-fatty-acyl-L-glutamate + H_{2}O $\rightleftharpoons$ a long-chain carboxylate + L-glutamate

Thus, the two substrates of this enzyme are N-long-chain-fatty-acyl-L-glutamate and H_{2}O, whereas its two products are long-chain carboxylate and L-glutamate.

This enzyme belongs to the family of hydrolases, those acting on carbon-nitrogen bonds other than peptide bonds, specifically in linear amides. The systematic name of this enzyme class is N-long-chain-fatty-acyl-L-glutamate amidohydrolase. Other names in common use include long-chain aminoacylase, long-chain-fatty-acyl-glutamate deacylase, long-chain acylglutamate amidase, and N-acyl-D-glutamate deacylase.
