= Protein-glucosylgalactosylhydroxylysine glucosidase =

protein-glucosylgalactosylhydroxylysine glucosidase

Identifiers
- EC no.: 3.2.1.107
- CAS no.: 72829-45-9

Databases
- IntEnz: IntEnz view
- BRENDA: BRENDA entry
- ExPASy: NiceZyme view
- KEGG: KEGG entry
- MetaCyc: metabolic pathway
- PRIAM: profile
- PDB structures: RCSB PDB PDBe PDBsum
- Gene Ontology: AmiGO / QuickGO
Search
- PMC: articles
- PubMed: articles
- NCBI: proteins

The enzyme protein-glucosylgalactosylhydroxylysine glucosidase (EC 3.2.1.107) catalyzes the following chemical reaction:

[collagen]-(5R)-5-O-[α-D-glucosyl-(1→2)-β-D-galactosyl]-5-hydroxy-L-lysine + H_{2}O = D-glucose + [collagen]-(5R)-5-O-(β-D-galactosyl)-5-hydroxy-L-lysine

It belongs to the family of hydrolases, specifically those glycosidases that hydrolyse O- and S-glycosyl compounds. The systematic name is protein-α-D-glucosyl-1,2-β-D-galactosyl-L-hydroxylysine glucohydrolase. Other names in common use include 2-O-α-D-glucopyranosyl-5-O-α-D-galactopyranosylhydroxy-L-lysine glucohydrolase, and lysine glucohydrolase.
