= 5-(3,4-diacetoxybut-1-ynyl)-2,2'-bithiophene deacetylase =

Class of enzymes

5-(3,4-diacetoxybut-1-ynyl)-2,2′-bithiophene deacetylase

Identifiers
- EC no.: 3.1.1.66

Databases
- IntEnz: IntEnz view
- BRENDA: BRENDA entry
- ExPASy: NiceZyme view
- KEGG: KEGG entry
- MetaCyc: metabolic pathway
- PRIAM: profile
- PDB structures: RCSB PDB PDBe PDBsum
- Gene Ontology: AmiGO / QuickGO
Search
- PMC: articles
- PubMed: articles
- NCBI: proteins

The enzyme 5-(3,4-diacetoxybut-1-ynyl)-2,2′-bithiophene deacetylase (EC 3.1.1.66) catalyzes the reaction

5-(3,4-diacetoxybut-1-ynyl)-2,2′-bithiophene + H_{2}O $\rightleftharpoons$ 5-(3-hydroxy-4-acetoxybut-1-ynyl)-2,2′-bithiophene + acetate

This enzyme belongs to the family of hydrolases, specifically those acting on carboxylic ester bonds. The systematic name is 5-(3,4-diacetoxybut-1-ynyl)-2,2′-bithiophene acetylhydrolase. Other names in common use include diacetoxybutynylbithiophene acetate esterase, and 3,4-diacetoxybutinylbithiophene:4-acetate esterase.
