= MTNX =

MTNX may refer to:

- 2-hydroxy-3-keto-5-methylthiopentenyl-1-phosphate phosphatase, an enzyme
- Four-cross, a style of mountain bike racing where four bikers race downhill on a prepared BMX-like track
