= 2-hydroxy-3-keto-5-methylthiopentenyl-1-phosphate phosphatase =

Class of enzymes

Identifiers
- EC no.: 3.1.3.87

Databases
- IntEnz: IntEnz view
- BRENDA: BRENDA entry
- ExPASy: NiceZyme view
- KEGG: KEGG entry
- MetaCyc: metabolic pathway
- PRIAM: profile
- PDB structures: RCSB PDB PDBe PDBsum
Search
- PMC: articles
- PubMed: articles
- NCBI: proteins

2-hydroxy-3-keto-5-methylthiopentenyl-1-phosphate phosphatase (EC 3.1.3.87, HK-MTPenyl-1-P phosphatase, MtnX, YkrX) is an enzyme with systematic name 2-hydroxy-5-(methylthio)-3-oxopent-1-enyl phosphate phosphohydrolase. This enzyme catalyses the following chemical reaction

2-hydroxy-5-(methylthio)-3-oxopent-1-enyl phosphate + H_{2}O $\rightleftharpoons$
1,2-dihydroxy-5-(methylthio)pent-1-en-3-one + phosphate

The enzyme participates in the methionine salvage pathway in Bacillus subtilis.
