= Sucrose-phosphatase =

sucrose-phosphatase

Identifiers
- EC no.: 3.1.3.24
- CAS no.: 9059-33-0

Databases
- IntEnz: IntEnz view
- BRENDA: BRENDA entry
- ExPASy: NiceZyme view
- KEGG: KEGG entry
- MetaCyc: metabolic pathway
- PRIAM: profile
- PDB structures: RCSB PDB PDBe PDBsum
- Gene Ontology: AmiGO / QuickGO
Search
- PMC: articles
- PubMed: articles
- NCBI: proteins

The enzyme sucrose-phosphatase (EC 3.1.3.24) catalyzes the reaction

sucrose 6^{F}-phosphate + H_{2}O $\rightleftharpoons$ sucrose + phosphate

This enzyme belongs to the family of hydrolases, specifically those acting on phosphoric monoester bonds. The systematic name of this enzyme class is sucrose-6^{F}-phosphate phosphohydrolase. Other names in common use include sucrose 6-phosphate hydrolase, sucrose-phosphate hydrolase, sucrose-phosphate phosphohydrolase, and sucrose-6-phosphatase. This enzyme participates in starch and sucrose metabolism.

== Structural studies ==
As of late 2007, 9 structures have been solved for this class of enzymes, with PDB accession codes 1S2O, 1TJ3, 1TJ4, 1TJ5, 1U2S, 1U2T, 2B1Q, 2B1R, and 2D2V.
