= Aminoacyl-tRNA hydrolase =

aminoacyl-tRNA hydrolase

Identifiers
- EC no.: 3.1.1.29
- CAS no.: 9054-98-2

Databases
- IntEnz: IntEnz view
- BRENDA: BRENDA entry
- ExPASy: NiceZyme view
- KEGG: KEGG entry
- MetaCyc: metabolic pathway
- PRIAM: profile
- PDB structures: RCSB PDB PDBe PDBsum
- Gene Ontology: AmiGO / QuickGO
Search
- PMC: articles
- PubMed: articles
- NCBI: proteins

The enzyme aminoacyl-tRNA hydrolase (EC 3.1.1.29) catalyzes the reaction

N-substituted aminoacyl-tRNA + H_{2}O $\rightleftharpoons$ N-substituted amino acid + tRNA

This enzyme belongs to the family of hydrolases, specifically those acting on carboxylic ester bonds. The systematic name is aminoacyl-tRNA aminoacylhydrolase. Other names in common use include aminoacyl-transfer ribonucleate hydrolase, N-substituted aminoacyl transfer RNA hydrolase, and peptidyl-tRNA hydrolase.

== Structural studies ==
As of late 2007, 9 structures have been solved for this class of enzymes, with PDB accession codes 1RYB, 1WN2, 1XTY, 2D3K, 2E1B, 2PTH, 2Z2I, 2Z2J, and 2Z2K.
