= Adenosylcobinamide hydrolase =

adenosylcobinamide hydrolase

Identifiers
- EC no.: 3.5.1.90
- CAS no.: 905988-16-1

Databases
- IntEnz: IntEnz view
- BRENDA: BRENDA entry
- ExPASy: NiceZyme view
- KEGG: KEGG entry
- MetaCyc: metabolic pathway
- PRIAM: profile
- PDB structures: RCSB PDB PDBe PDBsum
- Gene Ontology: AmiGO / QuickGO
Search
- PMC: articles
- PubMed: articles
- NCBI: proteins

In enzymology, an adenosylcobinamide hydrolase (EC 3.5.1.90) is an enzyme that catalyzes the chemical reaction

adenosylcobinamide + H_{2}O $\rightleftharpoons$ adenosylcobyric acid + (R)-1-aminopropan-2-ol

Thus, the two substrates of this enzyme are adenosylcobinamide and H_{2}O, whereas its two products are adenosylcobyric acid and (R)-1-aminopropan-2-ol.

This enzyme belongs to the family of hydrolases, those acting on carbon-nitrogen bonds other than peptide bonds, specifically in linear amides. The systematic name of this enzyme class is adenosylcobinamide amidohydrolase. Other names in common use include CbiZ, and AdoCbi amidohydrolase. This enzyme participates in porphyrin and chlorophyll metabolism.
