= UDP-2,3-diacylglucosamine diphosphatase =

Identifiers
- EC no.: 3.6.1.54

Databases
- IntEnz: IntEnz view
- BRENDA: BRENDA entry
- ExPASy: NiceZyme view
- KEGG: KEGG entry
- MetaCyc: metabolic pathway
- PRIAM: profile
- PDB structures: RCSB PDB PDBe PDBsum
Search
- PMC: articles
- PubMed: articles
- NCBI: proteins

UDP-2,3-diacylglucosamine diphosphatase (EC 3.6.1.54, UDP-2,3-diacylglucosamine hydrolase, UDP-2,3-diacylglucosamine pyrophosphatase, ybbF (gene), lpxH (gene)) is an enzyme with systematic name UDP-2,3-bis((3R)-3-hydroxymyristoyl)-alpha-D-glucosamine 2,3-bis((3R)-3-hydroxymyristoyl)-beta-D-glucosaminyl 1-phosphate phosphohydrolase. This enzyme catalyses the following chemical reaction

UDP-2,3-bis[(3R)-3-hydroxymyristoyl]-alpha-D-glucosamine + H_{2}O $\rightleftharpoons$ 2,3-bis[(3R)-3-hydroxymyristoyl]-beta-D-glucosaminyl 1-phosphate + UMP

The enzyme catalyses a step in the biosynthesis of lipid A.
