= 4-methyleneglutaminase =

Class of enzymes

Identifiers
- EC no.: 3.5.1.67
- CAS no.: 86855-36-9

Databases
- IntEnz: IntEnz view
- BRENDA: BRENDA entry
- ExPASy: NiceZyme view
- KEGG: KEGG entry
- MetaCyc: metabolic pathway
- PRIAM: profile
- PDB structures: RCSB PDB PDBe PDBsum
- Gene Ontology: AmiGO / QuickGO
Search
- PMC: articles
- PubMed: articles
- NCBI: proteins

In enzymology, a 4-methyleneglutaminase (EC 3.5.1.67) is an enzyme that catalyzes the chemical reaction

4-methylene-L-glutamine + H_{2}O $\rightleftharpoons$ 4-methylene-L-glutamate + NH_{3}

Thus, the two substrates of this enzyme are 4-methylene-L-glutamine and H_{2}O, whereas its two products are 4-methylene-L-glutamate and NH_{3}.

This enzyme belongs to the family of hydrolases, those acting on carbon-nitrogen bonds other than peptide bonds, specifically in linear amides. The systematic name of this enzyme class is 4-methylene-L-glutamine amidohydrolase. Other names in common use include 4-methyleneglutamine deamidase, and 4-methyleneglutamine amidohydrolase. This enzyme participates in c5-branched dibasic acid metabolism.
