= CMP-N-acylneuraminate phosphodiesterase =

Enzyme

Identifiers
- EC no.: 3.1.4.40
- CAS no.: 55326-41-5

Databases
- IntEnz: IntEnz view
- BRENDA: BRENDA entry
- ExPASy: NiceZyme view
- KEGG: KEGG entry
- MetaCyc: metabolic pathway
- PRIAM: profile
- PDB structures: RCSB PDB PDBe PDBsum
- Gene Ontology: AmiGO / QuickGO
Search
- PMC: articles
- PubMed: articles
- NCBI: proteins

The enzyme CMP-N-acylneuraminate phosphodiesterase (EC 3.1.4.40) catalyzes the reaction

CMP-N-acylneuraminate + H_{2}O $\rightleftharpoons$ CMP + N-acylneuraminate

This enzyme belongs to the family of hydrolases, specifically those acting on phosphoric diester bonds. The systematic name of this enzyme class is CMP-N-acylneuraminate N-acylneuraminohydrolase. Other names in common use include CMP-sialate hydrolase, CMP-sialic acid hydrolase, CMP-N-acylneuraminic acid hydrolase, cytidine monophosphosialic hydrolase, cytidine monophosphosialate hydrolase, cytidine monophosphate-N-acetylneuraminic acid hydrolase, and CMP-N-acetylneuraminate hydrolase.
