= Endoglycosylceramidase =

endoglycosylceramidase

Identifiers
- EC no.: 3.2.1.123
- CAS no.: 105503-61-5

Databases
- IntEnz: IntEnz view
- BRENDA: BRENDA entry
- ExPASy: NiceZyme view
- KEGG: KEGG entry
- MetaCyc: metabolic pathway
- PRIAM: profile
- PDB structures: RCSB PDB PDBe PDBsum
- Gene Ontology: AmiGO / QuickGO
Search
- PMC: articles
- PubMed: articles
- NCBI: proteins

The enzyme endoglycosylceramidase (EC 3.2.1.123) catalyzes the following chemical reaction:

oligoglycosylglucosylceramide + H_{2}O $\rightleftharpoons$ ceramide + oligoglycosylglucose

This enzyme belongs to the family of hydrolases, specifically those glycosidases that hydrolyse O- and S-glycosyl compounds. The systematic name is oligoglycosylglucosylceramide glycohydrolase. Other names in common use include endoglycoceramidase, EGCase, and glycosyl-N-acetyl-sphingosine 1,1-β-D-glucanohydrolase.

== Structural studies ==
As of late 2007, 6 structures have been solved for this class of enzymes, with PDB accession codes 2OSW, 2OSX, 2OSY, 2OYK, 2OYL, and 2OYM.
