= 4-acetamidobutyryl-CoA deacetylase =

Class of enzymes

Identifiers
- EC no.: 3.5.1.51

Databases
- IntEnz: IntEnz view
- BRENDA: BRENDA entry
- ExPASy: NiceZyme view
- KEGG: KEGG entry
- MetaCyc: metabolic pathway
- PRIAM: profile
- PDB structures: RCSB PDB PDBe PDBsum
- Gene Ontology: AmiGO / QuickGO
Search
- PMC: articles
- PubMed: articles
- NCBI: proteins

In enzymology, a 4-acetamidobutyryl-CoA deacetylase (EC 3.5.1.51) is an enzyme that catalyzes the chemical reaction

4-acetamidobutanoyl-CoA + H_{2}O $\rightleftharpoons$ acetate + 4-aminobutanoyl-CoA

Thus, the two substrates of this enzyme are 4-acetamidobutanoyl-CoA and H_{2}O, whereas its two products are acetate and 4-aminobutanoyl-CoA.

This enzyme belongs to the family of hydrolases, those acting on carbon-nitrogen bonds other than peptide bonds, specifically in linear amides. The systematic name of this enzyme class is 4-acetamidobutanoyl-CoA amidohydrolase. Other names in common use include aminobutyryl-CoA thiolesterase, and deacetylase-thiolesterase.
