= Alpha-D-ribose 1-methylphosphonate 5-triphosphate diphosphatase =

Class of enzymes

Identifiers
- EC no.: 3.6.1.63

Databases
- IntEnz: IntEnz view
- BRENDA: BRENDA entry
- ExPASy: NiceZyme view
- KEGG: KEGG entry
- MetaCyc: metabolic pathway
- PRIAM: profile
- PDB structures: RCSB PDB PDBe PDBsum
Search
- PMC: articles
- PubMed: articles
- NCBI: proteins

Alpha-D-ribose 1-methylphosphonate 5-triphosphate diphosphatase (EC 3.6.1.63, phnM (gene)) is an enzyme with systematic name alpha-D-ribose-1-methylphosphonate-5-triphosphate diphosphohydrolase. It catalyses the following chemical reaction:

α-D-ribose 1-methylphosphonate 5-triphosphate
H_{2}O
PP_{i}
α-D-ribose 1-methylphosphonate 5-phosphate

This enzyme characterised from the bacterium Escherichia coli hydrolyses α-D-ribose 1-methylphosphonate 5-triphosphate to remove a pyrophosphate (PP_{i}) group and give α-D-ribose 1-methylphosphonate 5-phosphate. This is part of a pathway that allows microorganisms to metabolise carbon-phosphorus bonds.
