= 3-deoxyoctulosonase =

Class of enzymes

Identifiers
- EC no.: 3.2.1.144

Databases
- IntEnz: IntEnz view
- BRENDA: BRENDA entry
- ExPASy: NiceZyme view
- KEGG: KEGG entry
- MetaCyc: metabolic pathway
- PRIAM: profile
- PDB structures: RCSB PDB PDBe PDBsum
- Gene Ontology: AmiGO / QuickGO
Search
- PMC: articles
- PubMed: articles
- NCBI: proteins

In enzymology, a 3-deoxyoctulosonase (EC 3.2.1.144) is an enzyme that catalyzes the chemical reaction

3-deoxyoctulosonyl-lipopolysaccharide + H_{2}O $\rightleftharpoons$ 3-deoxyoctulosonic acid + lipopolysaccharide

Thus, the two substrates of this enzyme are 3-deoxyoctulosonyl-lipopolysaccharide and H_{2}O, whereas its two products are 3-deoxyoctulosonic acid and lipopolysaccharide.

This enzyme belongs to the family of hydrolases, specifically those glycosidases that hydrolyse O- and S-glycosyl compounds. The systematic name of this enzyme class is 3-deoxyoctulosonyl-lipopolysaccharide hydrolase. This enzyme is also called alpha-Kdo-ase.
