= (hydroxymethylglutaryl-CoA reductase (NADPH))-phosphatase =

Class of enzymes

[hydroxymethylglutaryl-CoA reductase (NADPH)]-phosphatase

Identifiers
- EC no.: 3.1.3.47
- CAS no.: 73507-97-8

Databases
- IntEnz: IntEnz view
- BRENDA: BRENDA entry
- ExPASy: NiceZyme view
- KEGG: KEGG entry
- MetaCyc: metabolic pathway
- PRIAM: profile
- PDB structures: RCSB PDB PDBe PDBsum
- Gene Ontology: AmiGO / QuickGO
Search
- PMC: articles
- PubMed: articles
- NCBI: proteins

The enzyme [hydroxymethylglutaryl-CoA reductase (NADPH)]-phosphatase (EC 3.1.3.47) catalyzes the reaction

[hydroxymethylglutaryl-CoA reductase (NADPH)] phosphate + H_{2}O $\rightleftharpoons$ [hydroxymethylglutaryl-CoA reductase (NADPH)] + phosphate

This enzyme belongs to the family of hydrolases, specifically those acting on phosphoric monoester bonds. The systematic name is [hydroxymethylglutaryl-CoA reductase (NADPH)]-phosphate phosphohydrolase. This enzyme is also called reductase phosphatase.
