= Glucose-1-phospho-D-mannosylglycoprotein phosphodiesterase =

glucose-1-phospho-D-mannosylglycoprotein phosphodiesterase

Identifiers
- EC no.: 3.1.4.51
- CAS no.: 123940-44-3

Databases
- IntEnz: IntEnz view
- BRENDA: BRENDA entry
- ExPASy: NiceZyme view
- KEGG: KEGG entry
- MetaCyc: metabolic pathway
- PRIAM: profile
- PDB structures: RCSB PDB PDBe PDBsum
- Gene Ontology: AmiGO / QuickGO
Search
- PMC: articles
- PubMed: articles
- NCBI: proteins

The enzyme glucose-1-phospho-D-mannosylglycoprotein phosphodiesterase (EC 3.1.4.51) catalyzes the reaction

6-(D-glucose-1-phospho)-D-mannosylglycoprotein + H_{2}O $\rightleftharpoons$ α-D-glucose 1-phosphate + D-mannosylglycoprotein

This enzyme belongs to the family of hydrolases, specifically those acting on phosphoric diester bonds. The systematic name of this enzyme class is 6-(D-glucose-1-phospho)-D-mannosylglycoprotein glucose-1-phosphohydrolase. This enzyme is also called α-glucose-1-phosphate phosphodiesterase.
