= Xylan endo-1,3-β-xylosidase =

endo-1,3-β-Xylanase

Identifiers
- EC no.: 3.2.1.32
- CAS no.: 9025-55-2

Databases
- IntEnz: IntEnz view
- BRENDA: BRENDA entry
- ExPASy: NiceZyme view
- KEGG: KEGG entry
- MetaCyc: metabolic pathway
- PRIAM: profile
- PDB structures: RCSB PDB PDBe PDBsum
Search
- PMC: articles
- PubMed: articles
- NCBI: proteins

endo-1,3-β-Xylanase, EC 3.2.1.32 [xylanase (ambiguous), endo-1,3-β-xylosidase, 1,3-β-xylanase, 1,3-xylanase, β-1,3-xylanase, endo-β-1,3-xylanase, 1,3-β-D-xylan xylanohydrolase, xylan endo-1,3-β-xylosidase (misleading)] is an enzyme with systematic name 3-β-D-xylan xylanohydrolase. It catalyses the following chemical reaction:

Random endohydrolysis of (1→3)-β-D-glycosidic linkages in (1→3)-β-D-xylans

The enzyme is found mostly in marine bacteria, which break down the β(1,3)-xylan found in the cell wall of some green and red algae. It produces mainly xylobiose, xylotriose and xylotetraose.
