= Polynucleotide 3'-phosphatase =

polynucleotide 3′-phosphatase

Identifiers
- EC no.: 3.1.3.32
- CAS no.: 37288-16-7

Databases
- IntEnz: IntEnz view
- BRENDA: BRENDA entry
- ExPASy: NiceZyme view
- KEGG: KEGG entry
- MetaCyc: metabolic pathway
- PRIAM: profile
- PDB structures: RCSB PDB PDBe PDBsum
- Gene Ontology: AmiGO / QuickGO
Search
- PMC: articles
- PubMed: articles
- NCBI: proteins

The enzyme polynucleotide 3′-phosphatase (EC 3.1.3.32) catalyzes the reaction

a 3′-phosphopolynucleotide + H_{2}O $\rightleftharpoons$ a polynucleotide + phosphate

This enzyme belongs to the family of hydrolases, specifically those acting on phosphoric monoester bonds. The systematic name is polynucleotide 3'-phosphohydrolase. Other names in common use include 2′(3′)-polynucleotidase, DNA 3′-phosphatase, deoxyribonucleate 3′-phosphatase, and 5′-polynucleotidekinase 3′-phosphatase.

== Structural studies ==
As of late 2007, two structures have been solved for this class of enzymes, with PDB accession codes 1UJX and 2BRF.
