= Acetoxybutynylbithiophene deacetylase =

Class of enzymes

acetoxybutynylbithiophene deacetylase

Identifiers
- EC no.: 3.1.1.54
- CAS no.: 82346-63-2

Databases
- BRENDA: enzyme data
- ExPASy: NiceZyme view
- KEGG: enzyme entry
- MetaCyc: metabolic pathway
- Rhea: reactions
- PDB structures: RCSB PDB PDBe PDBsum
- Gene Ontology: AmiGO / QuickGO
Search
- PMC: articles
- PubMed: articles
- NCBI: proteins

The enzyme acetoxybutynylbithiophene deacetylase (EC 3.1.1.54) catalyzes the reaction:

5-(4-acetoxybut-1-ynyl)-2,2′-bithiophene + H_{2}O $\rightleftharpoons$ 5-(4-hydroxybut-1-ynyl)-2,2′-bithiophene + acetate

This enzyme belongs to the family of hydrolases, specifically those acting on carboxylic ester bonds. The systematic name is 5-(4-acetoxybut-1-ynyl)-2,2′-bithiophene O-acetylhydrolase. Other names in common use include acetoxybutynylbithiophene esterase, and 5-(4-acetoxy-1-butynyl)-2,2′-bithiophene:acetate esterase.
