= Esterase D =

Esterase D may refer to:

- Methylumbelliferyl-acetate deacetylase, an enzyme
- Carboxylesterase, an enzyme
