= Methylumbelliferyl-acetate deacetylase =

Class of enzymes

Identifiers
- EC no.: 3.1.1.56
- CAS no.: 83380-83-0

Databases
- BRENDA: enzyme data
- ExPASy: NiceZyme view
- KEGG: enzyme entry
- MetaCyc: metabolic pathway
- Rhea: reactions
- PDB structures: RCSB PDB PDBe PDBsum
- Gene Ontology: AmiGO / QuickGO
Search
- PMC: articles
- PubMed: articles
- NCBI: proteins

Methylumbelliferyl-acetate deacetylase (EC 3.1.1.56, esterase D) is an enzyme that catalyzes the reaction

4-methylumbelliferyl acetate
H_{2}O
H_{2}O
hymecromone
+
acetic acid

The enzyme characterised from humans hydrolyses 4-methylumbelliferyl acetate to hymecromone and acetic acid.

This enzyme is hydrolase, specifically one acting on carboxylic ester bonds. The systematic name is 4-methylumbelliferyl-acetate acylhydrolase. This enzyme is a member of the esterase D family.
