= Mannosylglycoprotein endo-beta-mannosidase =

Identifiers
- EC no.: 3.2.1.152
- CAS no.: 141176-95-6

Databases
- IntEnz: IntEnz view
- BRENDA: BRENDA entry
- ExPASy: NiceZyme view
- KEGG: KEGG entry
- MetaCyc: metabolic pathway
- PRIAM: profile
- PDB structures: RCSB PDB PDBe PDBsum
Search
- PMC: articles
- PubMed: articles
- NCBI: proteins

Mannosylglycoprotein endo-beta-mannosidase (EC 3.2.1.152, endo-beta-mannosidase) is an enzyme. This enzyme catalyses the following chemical reaction:

Hydrolysis of the alpha-D-mannosyl-(1->6)-beta-D-mannosyl-(1->4)-N-acetyl-beta-D-glucosaminyl-(1->4)-N-acetyl-beta-D-glucosaminyl sequence of glycoprotein to alpha-D-mannosyl-(1->6)-D-mannose and N-acetyl-beta-D-glucosaminyl-(1->4)-N-acetyl-beta-D-glucosaminyl sequences

The substrate group is a substituent on N-4 of an asparagine residue in the glycoprotein.
