= Formimidoylaspartate deiminase =

Class of enzymes

Identifiers
- EC no.: 3.5.3.5
- CAS no.: 9025-07-4

Databases
- BRENDA: enzyme data
- ExPASy: NiceZyme view
- KEGG: enzyme entry
- MetaCyc: metabolic pathway
- Rhea: reactions
- PDB structures: RCSB PDB PDBe PDBsum
- Gene Ontology: AmiGO / QuickGO
Search
- PMC: articles
- PubMed: articles
- NCBI: proteins

Formimidoylaspartate deiminase (EC 3.5.3.5) is an enzyme characterised from Pseudomonas species that catalyzes the hydrolysis of N-formimidoyl-L-aspartic acid to N-formyl-L-aspartic acid:

N-formimidoyl-L-aspartic acid
H_{2}O
NH_{3}
N-formyl-L-aspartic acid

The reaction is part of the breakdown pathway of the amino acid histidine.

This enzyme is a hydrolase, one acting on carbon-nitrogen bonds other than peptide bonds, specifically in linear amidines. The systematic name of this enzyme class is N-formimidoyl-L-aspartate iminohydrolase. This enzyme is also called formiminoaspartate deiminase.
