= 2-deoxyglucosidase =

Class of enzymes

2-Deoxyglucosidase

Identifiers
- EC no.: 3.2.1.112
- CAS no.: 92480-05-2

Databases
- IntEnz: IntEnz view
- BRENDA: BRENDA entry
- ExPASy: NiceZyme view
- KEGG: KEGG entry
- MetaCyc: metabolic pathway
- PRIAM: profile
- PDB structures: RCSB PDB PDBe PDBsum
- Gene Ontology: AmiGO / QuickGO
Search
- PMC: articles
- PubMed: articles
- NCBI: proteins

The enzyme 2-deoxyglucosidase (EC 3.2.1.112) catalyzes the following chemical reaction

a 2-deoxy-α-D-glucoside + H_{2}O $\rightleftharpoons$ 2-deoxy-D-glucose + an alcohol

It belongs to the family of hydrolases, specifically those glycosidases that hydrolyse O- and S-glycosyl compounds. The systematic name is 2-deoxy-α-D-glucoside deoxyglucohydrolase. Other names in common use include 2-deoxy-α-glucosidase, and 2-deoxy-α-D-glucosidase.
