= Exodeoxyribonuclease (phage SP3-induced) =

Class of enzymes

Exodeoxyribonuclease (phage SP_{3}-induced)

Identifiers
- EC no.: 3.1.11.4
- CAS no.: 37288-30-5

Databases
- IntEnz: IntEnz view
- BRENDA: BRENDA entry
- ExPASy: NiceZyme view
- KEGG: KEGG entry
- MetaCyc: metabolic pathway
- PRIAM: profile
- PDB structures: RCSB PDB PDBe PDBsum
Search
- PMC: articles
- PubMed: articles
- NCBI: proteins

Exodeoxyribonuclease (phage SP_{3}-induced) (EC 3.1.11.4, phage SP_{3} DNase, DNA 5′-dinucleotidohydrolase, deoxyribonucleate 5′-dinucleotidase, deoxyribonucleic 5′-dinucleotidohydrolase, bacteriophage SP_{3} deoxyribonuclease) is an enzyme. that catalyses the following chemical reaction

Exonucleolytic cleavage in the 5′- to 3′-direction to yield nucleoside 5′-phosphates

Preference for single-stranded DNA.
