= Arabinan endo-1,5-alpha-L-arabinosidase =

Class of enzymes

Arabinan endo-1,5-α-L-arabinanase

Identifiers
- EC no.: 3.2.1.99
- CAS no.: 75432-96-1

Databases
- BRENDA: enzyme data
- ExPASy: NiceZyme view
- KEGG: enzyme entry
- MetaCyc: metabolic pathway
- Rhea: reactions
- PDB structures: RCSB PDB PDBe PDBsum
Search
- PMC: articles
- PubMed: articles
- NCBI: proteins

Arabinan endo-1,5-α-L-arabinanase (EC 3.2.1.99, endo-1,5-α-L-arabinanase, endo-α-1,5-arabanase, endo-arabanase, 1,5-α-L-arabinan 1,5-α-L-arabinanohydrolase) is an enzyme with systematic name 5-α-L-arabinan 5-alpha-L-arabinanohydrolase. This enzyme catalyses the following chemical reaction

Endohydrolysis of (1->5)-α-arabinofuranosidic linkages in (1->5)-arabinans

This enzyme is most active on linear 1,5-α-L-arabinan.
