= (acetyl-CoA carboxylase)-phosphatase =

Class of enzymes

[acetyl-CoA carboxylase]-phosphatase

Identifiers
- EC no.: 3.1.3.44
- CAS no.: 77000-10-3

Databases
- IntEnz: IntEnz view
- BRENDA: BRENDA entry
- ExPASy: NiceZyme view
- KEGG: KEGG entry
- MetaCyc: metabolic pathway
- PRIAM: profile
- PDB structures: RCSB PDB PDBe PDBsum
- Gene Ontology: AmiGO / QuickGO
Search
- PMC: articles
- PubMed: articles
- NCBI: proteins

The enzyme [acetyl-CoA carboxylase]-phosphatase (EC 3.1.3.44) catalyzes the reaction

[acetyl-CoA carboxylase] phosphate + H_{2}O $\rightleftharpoons$ [acetyl-CoA carboxylase] + phosphate

This enzyme belongs to the family of hydrolases, specifically those acting on phosphoric monoester bonds. The systematic name is [acetyl-CoA:carbon-dioxide ligase (ADP-forming)]-phosphate phosphohydrolase.
