= Acetylalkylglycerol acetylhydrolase =

Class of enzymes

acetylalkylglycerol acetylhydrolase

Identifiers
- EC no.: 3.1.1.71

Databases
- IntEnz: IntEnz view
- BRENDA: BRENDA entry
- ExPASy: NiceZyme view
- KEGG: KEGG entry
- MetaCyc: metabolic pathway
- PRIAM: profile
- PDB structures: RCSB PDB PDBe PDBsum
- Gene Ontology: AmiGO / QuickGO
Search
- PMC: articles
- PubMed: articles
- NCBI: proteins

The enzyme acetylalkylglycerol acetylhydrolase (EC 3.1.1.71) catalyzes the reaction

2-acetyl-1-alkyl-sn-glycerol + H_{2}O $\rightleftharpoons$ 1-alkyl-sn-glycerol + acetate

This enzyme belongs to the family of hydrolases, specifically those acting on carboxylic ester bonds. The systematic name of this enzyme class is 2-acetyl-1-alkyl-sn-glycerol acetylhydrolase. This enzyme is also called alkylacetylglycerol acetylhydrolase.
