= (pyruvate kinase)-phosphatase =

Class of enzymes

[pyruvate kinase]-phosphatase

Identifiers
- EC no.: 3.1.3.49
- CAS no.: 79986-25-7

Databases
- IntEnz: IntEnz view
- BRENDA: BRENDA entry
- ExPASy: NiceZyme view
- KEGG: KEGG entry
- MetaCyc: metabolic pathway
- PRIAM: profile
- PDB structures: RCSB PDB PDBe PDBsum
- Gene Ontology: AmiGO / QuickGO
Search
- PMC: articles
- PubMed: articles
- NCBI: proteins

The enzyme [pyruvate kinase]-phosphatase (EC 3.1.3.49) catalyzes the reaction

[pyruvate kinase] phosphate + H_{2}O $\rightleftharpoons$ [pyruvate kinase] + phosphate

This enzyme belongs to the family of hydrolases, specifically those acting on phosphoric monoester bonds. The systematic name of this enzyme class is [ATP:pyruvate 2-O-phosphotransferase]-phosphate phosphohydrolase. This enzyme is also called pyruvate kinase phosphatase.
