= Fusarinine-C ornithinesterase =

fusarinine-C ornithinesterase

Identifiers
- EC no.: 3.1.1.48
- CAS no.: 60202-10-0

Databases
- IntEnz: IntEnz view
- BRENDA: BRENDA entry
- ExPASy: NiceZyme view
- KEGG: KEGG entry
- MetaCyc: metabolic pathway
- PRIAM: profile
- PDB structures: RCSB PDB PDBe PDBsum
- Gene Ontology: AmiGO / QuickGO
Search
- PMC: articles
- PubMed: articles
- NCBI: proteins

The enzyme fusarinine-C ornithinesterase (EC 3.1.1.48) catalyzes the reaction

N^{5}-acyl-L-ornithine ester + H_{2}O $\rightleftharpoons$ N^{5}-acyl-L-ornithine + an alcohol

This enzyme belongs to the family of hydrolases, specifically those acting on carboxylic ester bonds. The systematic name of this enzyme class is N^{5}-L-ornithine-ester hydrolase. Other names in common use include ornithine esterase, and 5-N^{5}-L-ornithine-ester hydrolase.
