= Deoxynucleotide 3'-phosphatase =

deoxynucleotide 3′-phosphatase

Identifiers
- EC no.: 3.1.3.34
- CAS no.: 37288-18-9

Databases
- IntEnz: IntEnz view
- BRENDA: BRENDA entry
- ExPASy: NiceZyme view
- KEGG: KEGG entry
- MetaCyc: metabolic pathway
- PRIAM: profile
- PDB structures: RCSB PDB PDBe PDBsum
- Gene Ontology: AmiGO / QuickGO
Search
- PMC: articles
- PubMed: articles
- NCBI: proteins

The enzyme deoxynucleotide 3′-phosphatase (EC 3.1.3.34) catalyzes the reaction

a 2′-deoxyribonucleoside 3′-phosphate + H_{2}O = a 2′-deoxyribonucleoside + phosphate

This enzyme belongs to the family of hydrolases, specifically those acting on phosphoric monoester bonds. The systematic name is 2′-deoxyribonucleotide 3′-phosphohydrolase. Other names in common use include 3′-deoxynucleotidase, and 3′-deoxyribonucleotidase.
