= Phosphatidylinositol deacylase =

phosphatidylinositol deacylase

Identifiers
- EC no.: 3.1.1.52
- CAS no.: 81604-94-6

Databases
- IntEnz: IntEnz view
- BRENDA: BRENDA entry
- ExPASy: NiceZyme view
- KEGG: KEGG entry
- MetaCyc: metabolic pathway
- PRIAM: profile
- PDB structures: RCSB PDB PDBe PDBsum
- Gene Ontology: AmiGO / QuickGO
Search
- PMC: articles
- PubMed: articles
- NCBI: proteins

The enzyme phosphatidylinositol deacylase (EC 3.1.1.52) catalyzes the reaction

1-phosphatidyl-D-myo-inositol + H_{2}O $\rightleftharpoons$ 1-acylglycerophosphoinositol + a carboxylate

This enzyme belongs to the family of hydrolases, specifically those acting on carboxylic ester bonds. The systematic name is 1-phosphatidyl-D-myo-inositol 2-acylhydrolase. Other names in common use include phosphatidylinositol phospholipase A_{2}, and phospholipase A_{2}.
