= Glucan endo-1,6-β-glucosidase =

Identifiers
- EC no.: 3.2.1.75
- CAS no.: 37278-39-0

Databases
- IntEnz: IntEnz view
- BRENDA: BRENDA entry
- ExPASy: NiceZyme view
- KEGG: KEGG entry
- MetaCyc: metabolic pathway
- PRIAM: profile
- PDB structures: RCSB PDB PDBe PDBsum
Search
- PMC: articles
- PubMed: articles
- NCBI: proteins

Glucan endo-1,6-β-glucosidase (EC 3.2.1.75, endo-1,6-β-glucanase, β-(1→6)-β-D-glucanase, β-1,6-glucanase-pustulanase, β-1,6-glucan hydrolase, β-1,6-glucan 6-glucanohydrolase, 1,6-β-D-glucan glucanohydrolase) is an enzyme with systematic name 6-β-D-glucan glucanohydrolase. It catalyses random hydrolysis of (1→6)-linkages in (1→6)-β-D-glucans

This enzyme acts on lutean, pustulan and 1,6-oligo-β-D-glucosides.
