= 2-deoxyglucose-6-phosphatase =

Class of enzymes

Identifiers
- EC no.: 3.1.3.68
- CAS no.: 65187-56-6

Databases
- IntEnz: IntEnz view
- BRENDA: BRENDA entry
- ExPASy: NiceZyme view
- KEGG: KEGG entry
- MetaCyc: metabolic pathway
- PRIAM: profile
- PDB structures: RCSB PDB PDBe PDBsum
- Gene Ontology: AmiGO / QuickGO
Search
- PMC: articles
- PubMed: articles
- NCBI: proteins

The enzyme 2-deoxyglucose-6-phosphatase (EC 3.1.3.68) catalyzes the reaction

2-deoxy-D-glucose 6-phosphate + H_{2}O $\rightleftharpoons$ 2-deoxy-D-glucose + phosphate

This enzyme belongs to the family of hydrolases, specifically those acting on phosphoric monoester bonds. The systematic name is 2-deoxy-D-glucose-6-phosphate phosphohydrolase. This enzyme is also called 2-deoxyglucose-6-phosphate phosphatase.
