= Oligoxyloglucan beta-glycosidase =

Class of enzymes

Oligoxyloglucan β-glycosidase

Identifiers
- EC no.: 3.2.1.120
- CAS no.: 97162-80-6

Databases
- IntEnz: IntEnz view
- BRENDA: BRENDA entry
- ExPASy: NiceZyme view
- KEGG: KEGG entry
- MetaCyc: metabolic pathway
- PRIAM: profile
- PDB structures: RCSB PDB PDBe PDBsum
Search
- PMC: articles
- PubMed: articles
- NCBI: proteins

Oligoxyloglucan β-glycosidase (EC 3.2.1.120, isoprimeverose-producing oligoxyloglucan hydrolase oligoxyloglucan hydrolase) is an enzyme with systematic name oligoxyloglucan xyloglucohydrolase. This enzyme catalyses the following chemical reaction

Hydrolysis of (1->4)-β-D-glucosidic links in oligoxyloglucans so as to remove successive isoprimeverose [i..e.. α-xylo-(1->6)-β-D-glucosyl-] residues from the non-reducing chain ends
