= ADP-phosphoglycerate phosphatase =

Identifiers
- EC no.: 3.1.3.28
- CAS no.: 37288-12-3

Databases
- IntEnz: IntEnz view
- BRENDA: BRENDA entry
- ExPASy: NiceZyme view
- KEGG: KEGG entry
- MetaCyc: metabolic pathway
- PRIAM: profile
- PDB structures: RCSB PDB PDBe PDBsum
- Gene Ontology: AmiGO / QuickGO
Search
- PMC: articles
- PubMed: articles
- NCBI: proteins

The enzyme ADP-phosphoglycerate phosphatase (EC 3.1.3.28) catalyzes the reaction

3-(ADP)-2-phosphoglycerate + H_{2}O $\rightleftharpoons$ 3-(ADP)-glycerate + phosphate

This enzyme belongs to the family of hydrolases, specifically those acting on phosphoric monoester bonds. The systematic name is 3-(ADP)-2-phosphoglycerate phosphohydrolase. This enzyme is also called adenosine diphosphate phosphoglycerate phosphatase.
