= Muramoyltetrapeptide carboxypeptidase =

Identifiers
- EC no.: 3.4.17.13
- CAS no.: 60063-80-1

Databases
- IntEnz: IntEnz view
- BRENDA: BRENDA entry
- ExPASy: NiceZyme view
- KEGG: KEGG entry
- MetaCyc: metabolic pathway
- PRIAM: profile
- PDB structures: RCSB PDB PDBe PDBsum
Search
- PMC: articles
- PubMed: articles
- NCBI: proteins

Muramoyltetrapeptide carboxypeptidase (EC 3.4.17.13, carboxypeptidase IIW, carboxypeptidase II, lysyl-D-alanine carboxypeptidase, L-lysyl-D-alanine carboxypeptidase, LD-carboxypeptidase) is an enzyme. This enzyme catalyses the following chemical reaction

Hydrolysis of the bond: N-acetyl-D-glucosaminyl-N-acetylmuramoyl-L-Ala-D-glutamyl-6-carboxy-L-lysyl--D-alanine

Variants are known from various microorganisms.
