= Amylo-α-1,6-glucosidase =

Identifiers
- EC no.: 3.2.1.33
- CAS no.: 9012-47-9

Databases
- IntEnz: IntEnz view
- BRENDA: BRENDA entry
- ExPASy: NiceZyme view
- KEGG: KEGG entry
- MetaCyc: metabolic pathway
- PRIAM: profile
- PDB structures: RCSB PDB PDBe PDBsum
Search
- PMC: articles
- PubMed: articles
- NCBI: proteins

Amylo-α-1,6-glucosidase (EC 3.2.1.33, amylo-1,6-glucosidase, dextrin 6-α-D-glucosidase, amylopectin 1,6-glucosidase, dextrin-1,6-glucosidase, glycogen phosphorylase-limit dextrin α-1,6-glucohydrolase) is an enzyme with systematic name glycogen phosphorylase-limit dextrin 6-α-glucohydrolase. It catalyses the hydrolysis of unsubstituted glucose units in glycogen linked by α(1→6) bonds to α(1→4)glucose chains.
