= Monoterpenyl-diphosphatase =

monoterpenyl-diphosphatase

Identifiers
- EC no.: 3.1.7.3

Databases
- IntEnz: IntEnz view
- BRENDA: BRENDA entry
- ExPASy: NiceZyme view
- KEGG: KEGG entry
- MetaCyc: metabolic pathway
- PRIAM: profile
- PDB structures: RCSB PDB PDBe PDBsum
- Gene Ontology: AmiGO / QuickGO
Search
- PMC: articles
- PubMed: articles
- NCBI: proteins

The enzyme monoterpenyl-diphosphatase (EC 3.1.7.3) catalyzes the reaction

a monoterpenyl diphosphate + H_{2}O $\rightleftharpoons$ a monoterpenol + diphosphate

This enzyme belongs to the family of hydrolases, specifically those acting on diphosphoric monoester bonds. The systematic name is monoterpenyl-diphosphate diphosphohydrolase. Other names in common use include bornyl pyrophosphate hydrolase and monoterpenyl-pyrophosphatase.
