= Fatty-acyl-ethyl-ester synthase =

fatty-acyl-ethyl-ester synthase

Identifiers
- EC no.: 3.1.1.67

Databases
- IntEnz: IntEnz view
- BRENDA: BRENDA entry
- ExPASy: NiceZyme view
- KEGG: KEGG entry
- MetaCyc: metabolic pathway
- PRIAM: profile
- PDB structures: RCSB PDB PDBe PDBsum
- Gene Ontology: AmiGO / QuickGO
Search
- PMC: articles
- PubMed: articles
- NCBI: proteins

The enzyme fatty-acyl-ethyl-ester synthase (EC 3.1.1.67) catalyzes the reaction

a long-chain-fatty-acyl ethyl ester + H_{2}O $\rightleftharpoons$ a long-chain-fatty acid + ethanol

This enzyme belongs to the family of hydrolases, specifically those acting on carboxylic ester bonds. The systematic name is long-chain-fatty-acyl-ethyl-ester acylhydrolase. This enzyme is also called FAEES.
