= Endopeptidase La =

Type of enzyme

Identifiers
- EC no.: 3.4.21.53
- CAS no.: 79818-35-2

Databases
- IntEnz: IntEnz view
- BRENDA: BRENDA entry
- ExPASy: NiceZyme view
- KEGG: KEGG entry
- MetaCyc: metabolic pathway
- PRIAM: profile
- PDB structures: RCSB PDB PDBe PDBsum
Search
- PMC: articles
- PubMed: articles
- NCBI: proteins

Endopeptidase La (EC 3.4.21.53, ATP-dependent serine proteinase, lon proteinase, protease La, proteinase La, ATP-dependent lon proteinase, ATP-dependent protease La, Escherichia coli proteinase La, Escherichia coli serine proteinase La, gene lon protease, gene lon proteins, PIM1 protease, PIM1 proteinase, serine protease La) is an enzyme. This enzyme catalyses hydrolysis of proteins in the presence of ATP.

This enzyme is a product of the lon gene in Escherichia coli.
