= Sugar-terminal-phosphatase =

sugar-terminal-phosphatase

Identifiers
- EC no.: 3.1.3.58
- CAS no.: 99283-70-2

Databases
- IntEnz: IntEnz view
- BRENDA: BRENDA entry
- ExPASy: NiceZyme view
- KEGG: KEGG entry
- MetaCyc: metabolic pathway
- PRIAM: profile
- PDB structures: RCSB PDB PDBe PDBsum
- Gene Ontology: AmiGO / QuickGO
Search
- PMC: articles
- PubMed: articles
- NCBI: proteins

The enzyme sugar-terminal-phosphatase (EC 3.1.3.58) catalyzes the chemical reaction

D-glucose 6-phosphate + H_{2}O $\rightleftharpoons$ D-glucose + phosphate

This enzyme belongs to the family of hydrolases, specifically those acting on phosphoric monoester bonds. The systematic name is sugar-ω-phosphate phosphohydrolase. This enzyme is also called xylitol-5-phosphatase.
