= Uronolactonase =

Class of enzymes

uronolactonase

Identifiers
- EC no.: 3.1.1.19
- CAS no.: 9025-93-8

Databases
- IntEnz: IntEnz view
- BRENDA: BRENDA entry
- ExPASy: NiceZyme view
- KEGG: KEGG entry
- MetaCyc: metabolic pathway
- PRIAM: profile
- PDB structures: RCSB PDB PDBe PDBsum
- Gene Ontology: AmiGO / QuickGO
Search
- PMC: articles
- PubMed: articles
- NCBI: proteins

The enzyme uronolactonase (EC 3.1.1.19) catalyzes the reaction

D-glucurono-6,2-lactone + H_{2}O $\rightleftharpoons$ D-glucuronate

This enzyme belongs to the family of hydrolases, specifically those acting on carboxylic ester bonds. The systematic name is D-glucurono-6,2-lactone lactonohydrolase. It is also called glucuronolactonase. It participates in ascorbate and aldarate metabolism.
