= Peptidoglycan β-N-acetylmuramidase =

Identifiers
- EC no.: 3.2.1.92
- CAS no.: 52219-03-1

Databases
- IntEnz: IntEnz view
- BRENDA: BRENDA entry
- ExPASy: NiceZyme view
- KEGG: KEGG entry
- MetaCyc: metabolic pathway
- PRIAM: profile
- PDB structures: RCSB PDB PDBe PDBsum
Search
- PMC: articles
- PubMed: articles
- NCBI: proteins

Peptidoglycan β-N-acetylmuramidase (EC 3.2.1.92, exo-β-N-acetylmuramidase, exo-β-acetylmuramidase, β-2-acetamido-3-O-(D-1-carboxyethyl)-2-deoxy-D-glucoside acetamidodeoxyglucohydrolase) is an enzyme with systematic name peptidoglycan β-N-acetylmuramoylexohydrolase. It catalyses the hydrolysis of terminal, non-reducing N-acetylmuramic residues.
