= Sugar-phosphatase =

sugar-phosphatase

Identifiers
- EC no.: 3.1.3.23
- CAS no.: 9023-07-8

Databases
- BRENDA: enzyme data
- ExPASy: NiceZyme view
- KEGG: enzyme entry
- MetaCyc: metabolic pathway
- Rhea: reactions
- PDB structures: RCSB PDB PDBe PDBsum
- Gene Ontology: AmiGO / QuickGO
Search
- PMC: articles
- PubMed: articles
- NCBI: proteins

The enzyme sugar-phosphatase (EC 3.1.3.23) catalyzes the reaction

sugar phosphate + H_{2}O $\rightleftharpoons$ sugar + phosphate

This enzyme belongs to the family of hydrolases, specifically those acting on phosphoric monoester bonds. The systematic name is sugar-phosphate phosphohydrolase.

== Structural studies ==
As of late 2007, only one structure has been solved for this class of enzymes, with the PDB accession code PDB: 2HF2.
