= 4-methyloxaloacetate esterase =

Class of enzymes

Identifiers
- EC no.: 3.1.1.44
- CAS no.: 74812-46-7

Databases
- IntEnz: IntEnz view
- BRENDA: BRENDA entry
- ExPASy: NiceZyme view
- KEGG: KEGG entry
- MetaCyc: metabolic pathway
- PRIAM: profile
- PDB structures: RCSB PDB PDBe PDBsum
- Gene Ontology: AmiGO / QuickGO
Search
- PMC: articles
- PubMed: articles
- NCBI: proteins

The enzyme 4-methyloxaloacetate esterase (EC 3.1.1.44) catalyzes the reaction

oxaloacetate 4-methyl ester + H_{2}O $\rightleftharpoons$ oxaloacetate + methanol

This enzyme belongs to the family of hydrolases, specifically those acting on carboxylic ester bonds. The systematic name is oxaloacetate-4-methyl-ester oxaloacetohydrolase.
