= Leucyl endopeptidase =

Identifiers
- EC no.: 3.4.21.57
- CAS no.: 136396-22-0

Databases
- IntEnz: IntEnz view
- BRENDA: BRENDA entry
- ExPASy: NiceZyme view
- KEGG: KEGG entry
- MetaCyc: metabolic pathway
- PRIAM: profile
- PDB structures: RCSB PDB PDBe PDBsum
Search
- PMC: articles
- PubMed: articles
- NCBI: proteins

Leucyl endopeptidase (EC 3.4.21.57, plant Leu-proteinase, leucine-specific serine proteinase, leucine endopeptidase, spinach serine proteinase (leucine specific), spinach leucine-specific serine proteinase, Leu-proteinase) is an enzyme. This enzyme catalyses the following chemical reaction

Hydrolysis of proteins. Preferential cleavage: Leu- in small molecule substrates

This enzyme is isolated from leaves of the spinach plant (Spinacia oleracea)
