= Gly-X carboxypeptidase =

Gly-Xaa carboxypeptidase

Identifiers
- EC no.: 3.4.17.4
- CAS no.: 9025-25-6

Databases
- IntEnz: IntEnz view
- BRENDA: BRENDA entry
- ExPASy: NiceZyme view
- KEGG: KEGG entry
- MetaCyc: metabolic pathway
- PRIAM: profile
- PDB structures: RCSB PDB PDBe PDBsum
Search
- PMC: articles
- PubMed: articles
- NCBI: proteins

Gly-Xaa carboxypeptidase (EC 3.4.17.4, glycine carboxypeptidase, carboxypeptidase a, carboxypeptidase S, peptidase alpha, yeast carboxypeptidase) is an enzyme. This enzyme catalyses the following chemical reaction

Release of a C-terminal amino acid from a peptide in which glycine is the penultimate amino acid, e.g. Z-Gly!Leu

This enzyme is isolated from yeast.
