= Deoxyribonuclease (pyrimidine dimer) =

Identifiers
- EC no.: 3.1.25.1
- CAS no.: 66143-22-4

Databases
- IntEnz: IntEnz view
- BRENDA: BRENDA entry
- ExPASy: NiceZyme view
- KEGG: KEGG entry
- MetaCyc: metabolic pathway
- PRIAM: profile
- PDB structures: RCSB PDB PDBe PDBsum
Search
- PMC: articles
- PubMed: articles
- NCBI: proteins

Deoxyribonuclease (pyrimidine dimer) (EC 3.1.25.1, endodeoxyribonuclease (pyrimidine dimer), bacteriophage T4 endodeoxyribonuclease V, T4 endonuclease V) is an enzyme. This enzyme catalyses the following chemical reaction:

Endonucleolytic cleavage near pyrimidine dimers to products with 5'-phosphate

This enzyme acts on a damaged strand, 5' from the damaged site.
