= Cerevisin =

Identifiers
- EC no.: 3.4.21.48
- CAS no.: 37288-81-6

Databases
- IntEnz: IntEnz view
- BRENDA: BRENDA entry
- ExPASy: NiceZyme view
- KEGG: KEGG entry
- MetaCyc: metabolic pathway
- PRIAM: profile
- PDB structures: RCSB PDB PDBe PDBsum
Search
- PMC: articles
- PubMed: articles
- NCBI: proteins

Cerevisin (EC 3.4.21.48, yeast proteinase B, proteinase yscB, baker's yeast proteinase B, brewer's yeast proteinase, peptidase beta) is an enzyme. This enzyme catalyses the following chemical reaction

Hydrolysis of proteins with broad specificity, and of Bz-Arg-OEt Ac-Tyr-OEt. Does not hydrolyse peptide amides

This enzyme is isolated from Saccharomyces cerevisiae (baker's yeast).
