= Glucan endo-1,2-β-glucosidase =

Identifiers
- EC no.: 3.2.1.71
- CAS no.: 37288-49-6

Databases
- IntEnz: IntEnz view
- BRENDA: BRENDA entry
- ExPASy: NiceZyme view
- KEGG: KEGG entry
- MetaCyc: metabolic pathway
- PRIAM: profile
- PDB structures: RCSB PDB PDBe PDBsum
Search
- PMC: articles
- PubMed: articles
- NCBI: proteins

Glucan endo-1,2-β-glucosidase (EC 3.2.1.71, endo-1,2-β-glucanase, β-D-1,2-glucanase, endo-(1→2)-β-D-glucanase, 1,2-β-D-glucan glucanohydrolase) is an enzyme with systematic name 2-β-D-glucan glucanohydrolase. It catalyses random hydrolysis of (1→2)-glucosidic linkages in (1→2)-β-D-glucans.
