= Galactan 1,3-beta-galactosidase =

Identifiers
- EC no.: 3.2.1.145
- CAS no.: 161515-48-6

Databases
- IntEnz: IntEnz view
- BRENDA: BRENDA entry
- ExPASy: NiceZyme view
- KEGG: KEGG entry
- MetaCyc: metabolic pathway
- PRIAM: profile
- PDB structures: RCSB PDB PDBe PDBsum
Search
- PMC: articles
- PubMed: articles
- NCBI: proteins

Galactan 1,3-beta-galactosidase (EC 3.2.1.145, galactan (1->3)-beta-D-galactosidase) is an enzyme with systematic name galactan 3-beta-D-galactosidase. This enzyme catalyses the following chemical reaction

Hydrolysis of terminal, non-reducing beta-D-galactose residues in (1->3)-beta-D-galactopyranans

This enzyme removes not only free galactose, but also 6-glycosylated residues.
