= Acylaminoacyl-peptidase =

Class of enzymes

Identifiers
- EC no.: 3.4.19.1
- CAS no.: 73562-30-8

Databases
- BRENDA: enzyme data
- ExPASy: NiceZyme view
- KEGG: enzyme entry
- MetaCyc: metabolic pathway
- Rhea: reactions
- PDB structures: RCSB PDB PDBe PDBsum
Search
- PMC: articles
- PubMed: articles
- NCBI: proteins

Acylaminoacyl-peptidase (EC 3.4.19.1, acylamino-acid-releasing enzyme, N-acylpeptide hydrolase, N-formylmethionine (fMet) aminopeptidase, alpha-N-acylpeptide hydrolase) is an enzyme. This enzyme catalyses the following chemical reaction

Cleavage of an N-acetyl or N-formyl amino acid from the N-terminus of a polypeptide

This enzyme is active at neutral pH.
