= CC-preferring endodeoxyribonuclease =

Identifiers
- EC no.: 3.1.21.6
- CAS no.: 37211-67-9

Databases
- IntEnz: IntEnz view
- BRENDA: BRENDA entry
- ExPASy: NiceZyme view
- KEGG: KEGG entry
- MetaCyc: metabolic pathway
- PRIAM: profile
- PDB structures: RCSB PDB PDBe PDBsum
Search
- PMC: articles
- PubMed: articles
- NCBI: proteins

CC-preferring endodeoxyribonuclease (EC 3.1.21.6, Streptomyces glaucescens exocytoplasmic dodeoxyribonuclease) is an enzyme. This enzyme catalyses the following chemical reaction

endonucleolytic cleavage to give 5'-phosphooligonucleotide end-products, with a preference for cleavage within the sequence CC

This enzyme has preference for CC sites in double-stranded circular and linear DNA.
