= Cetraxate benzylesterase =

cetraxate benzylesterase

Identifiers
- EC no.: 3.1.1.70

Databases
- IntEnz: IntEnz view
- BRENDA: BRENDA entry
- ExPASy: NiceZyme view
- KEGG: KEGG entry
- MetaCyc: metabolic pathway
- PRIAM: profile
- PDB structures: RCSB PDB PDBe PDBsum
- Gene Ontology: AmiGO / QuickGO
Search
- PMC: articles
- PubMed: articles
- NCBI: proteins

The enzyme cetraxate benzylesterase (EC 3.1.1.70) catalyzes the reaction

cetraxate benzyl ester + H_{2}O $\rightleftharpoons$ cetraxate + benzyl alcohol

This enzyme belongs to the family of hydrolases, specifically those acting on carboxylic ester bonds. The systematic name is cetraxate-benzyl-ester benzylhydrolase.
