= Plasmepsin I =

Enzyme present in Plasmodium

Identifiers
- EC no.: 3.4.23.38
- CAS no.: 180189-87-1

Databases
- IntEnz: IntEnz view
- BRENDA: BRENDA entry
- ExPASy: NiceZyme view
- KEGG: KEGG entry
- MetaCyc: metabolic pathway
- PRIAM: profile
- PDB structures: RCSB PDB PDBe PDBsum
Search
- PMC: articles
- PubMed: articles
- NCBI: proteins

Plasmepsin I (EC 3.4.23.38, aspartic hemoglobinase I, PFAPG, malaria aspartic hemoglobinase) is an enzyme. This enzyme catalyses the following chemical reaction

Hydrolysis of the -Phe^{33}-Leu- bond in the alpha-chain of hemoglobin, leading to denaturation of the molecule

This enzyme is present in the malaria organism, Plasmodium.
