= Flavastacin =

Identifiers
- EC no.: 3.4.24.76
- CAS no.: 167973-66-2

Databases
- BRENDA: enzyme data
- ExPASy: NiceZyme view
- KEGG: enzyme entry
- MetaCyc: metabolic pathway
- Rhea: reactions
- PDB structures: RCSB PDB PDBe PDBsum
Search
- PMC: articles
- PubMed: articles
- NCBI: proteins

Flavastacin (EC 3.4.24.76) is an enzyme. This enzyme catalyses the following chemical reaction

Hydrolyses polypeptides on the amino-side of Asp in -Xaa-Asp-. Acts very slowly on -Xaa-Glu

This zinc metalloendopeptidase belong to the peptidase family M12. It has recently been described as cleaving specifically after N-glycosylated asparagine, making it a potentially useful as a tool to analytically characterize glycoproteins.
