= N-Formylmethionyl-peptidase =

N-formylmethionyl-peptidase

Identifiers
- EC no.: 3.4.19.7
- CAS no.: 76106-80-4

Databases
- IntEnz: IntEnz view
- BRENDA: BRENDA entry
- ExPASy: NiceZyme view
- KEGG: KEGG entry
- MetaCyc: metabolic pathway
- PRIAM: profile
- PDB structures: RCSB PDB PDBe PDBsum
Search
- PMC: articles
- PubMed: articles
- NCBI: proteins

N-formylmethionyl-peptidase (EC 3.4.19.7, (fMet)-releasing enzyme, formylmethionine aminopeptidase) is an enzyme. This enzyme catalyses the following chemical reaction

Release of an N-terminal, formyl-methionyl residue from a polypeptide

This enzyme is highly specific for N-formylmethionyl peptides.
