= Fragilysin =

Identifiers
- EC no.: 3.4.24.74
- CAS no.: 188596-63-6

Databases
- IntEnz: IntEnz view
- BRENDA: BRENDA entry
- ExPASy: NiceZyme view
- KEGG: KEGG entry
- MetaCyc: metabolic pathway
- PRIAM: profile
- PDB structures: RCSB PDB PDBe PDBsum
Search
- PMC: articles
- PubMed: articles
- NCBI: proteins

Fragilysin (EC 3.4.24.74, Bacteroides fragilis (entero)toxin) is an enzyme. This enzyme catalyses the following chemical reaction

Broad proteolytic specificity, bonds hydrolysed including -Gly-Leu-, -Met-Leu-, -Phe-Leu-, -Cys-Leu-, Leu-Gly

It is thought to be a cause of diarrhoea in animals and humans.
