= PepB aminopeptidase =

Class of enzymes

Identifiers
- EC no.: 3.4.11.23
- CAS no.: 928346-44-5

Databases
- IntEnz: IntEnz view
- BRENDA: BRENDA entry
- ExPASy: NiceZyme view
- KEGG: KEGG entry
- MetaCyc: metabolic pathway
- PRIAM: profile
- PDB structures: RCSB PDB PDBe PDBsum
Search
- PMC: articles
- PubMed: articles
- NCBI: proteins

PepB aminopeptidase (EC 3.4.11.23, Salmonella enterica serovar Typhimurium peptidase B) is an enzyme which catalyses the following chemical reaction:

Release of an N-terminal amino acid, Xaa, from a peptide or arylamide.

Xaa is preferably Glu or Asp, but may be other amino acids, including Leu, Met, His, Cys and Gln.
