= Exodeoxyribonuclease III =

Identifiers
- EC no.: 3.1.11.2
- CAS no.: 9037-44-9

Databases
- IntEnz: IntEnz view
- BRENDA: BRENDA entry
- ExPASy: NiceZyme view
- KEGG: KEGG entry
- MetaCyc: metabolic pathway
- PRIAM: profile
- PDB structures: RCSB PDB PDBe PDBsum
Search
- PMC: articles
- PubMed: articles
- NCBI: proteins

Exodeoxyribonuclease III (EC 3.1.11.2, Escherichia coli exonuclease III, E. coli exonuclease III, endoribonuclease III) is an enzyme that catalyses the following reaction

Exonucleolytic cleavage in the 3′- to 5′-direction to yield nucleoside 5′-phosphates

This enzyme has a preference for double-stranded DNA.
