= Ribonuclease IX =

Identifiers
- EC no.: 3.1.26.10
- CAS no.: 9001-99-4

Databases
- IntEnz: IntEnz view
- BRENDA: BRENDA entry
- ExPASy: NiceZyme view
- KEGG: KEGG entry
- MetaCyc: metabolic pathway
- PRIAM: profile
- PDB structures: RCSB PDB PDBe PDBsum
Search
- PMC: articles
- PubMed: articles
- NCBI: proteins

Ribonuclease IX (EC 3.1.26.10, poly(U)- and poly(C)-specific endoribonuclease) is an enzyme. This enzyme catalyses the following chemical reaction

Endonucleolytic cleavage of poly(U) or poly(C) to fragments terminated by 3'-hydroxy and 5'-phosphate groups

This enzyme acts on poly(U) and poly(C).
