= Rhamnogalacturonan acetylesterase =

Class of enzymes

Identifiers
- EC no.: 3.1.1.86

Databases
- BRENDA: enzyme data
- ExPASy: NiceZyme view
- KEGG: enzyme entry
- MetaCyc: metabolic pathway
- Rhea: reactions
- PDB structures: RCSB PDB PDBe PDBsum
Search
- PMC: articles
- PubMed: articles
- NCBI: proteins

Rhamnogalacturonan acetylesterase (EC 3.1.1.86, RGAE; systematic name rhamnogalacturonan 2/3-O-acetyl-α-D-galacturonate O-acetylhydrolase) is an enzyme catalyses the reaction

Hydrolytic cleavage of 2-O-acetyl- or 3-O-acetyl groups of α-D-galacturonic acid in rhamnogalacturonan I.
