= Ribonuclease F =

Identifiers
- EC no.: 3.1.27.7
- CAS no.: 80498-18-6

Databases
- IntEnz: IntEnz view
- BRENDA: BRENDA entry
- ExPASy: NiceZyme view
- KEGG: KEGG entry
- MetaCyc: metabolic pathway
- PRIAM: profile
- PDB structures: RCSB PDB PDBe PDBsum
Search
- PMC: articles
- PubMed: articles
- NCBI: proteins

Ribonuclease F (EC 3.1.27.7, ribonuclease F (E. coli)) is an enzyme. This enzyme catalyses the following chemical reaction

Endonucleolytic cleavage of RNA precursor into two, leaving 5'-hydroxy and 3'-phosphate groups
