= Endogalactosaminidase =

Identifiers
- EC no.: 3.2.1.109
- CAS no.: 118478-30-1

Databases
- IntEnz: IntEnz view
- BRENDA: BRENDA entry
- ExPASy: NiceZyme view
- KEGG: KEGG entry
- MetaCyc: metabolic pathway
- PRIAM: profile
- PDB structures: RCSB PDB PDBe PDBsum
Search
- PMC: articles
- PubMed: articles
- NCBI: proteins

Endogalactosaminidase (EC 3.2.1.109) is an enzyme with systematic name galactosaminoglycan glycanohydrolase. It catalyses endohydrolysis of (1→4)-α-D-galactosaminidic linkages in poly(D-galactosamine).
