= Yeast ribonuclease =

Identifiers
- EC no.: 3.1.14.1

Databases
- IntEnz: IntEnz view
- BRENDA: BRENDA entry
- ExPASy: NiceZyme view
- KEGG: KEGG entry
- MetaCyc: metabolic pathway
- PRIAM: profile
- PDB structures: RCSB PDB PDBe PDBsum
Search
- PMC: articles
- PubMed: articles
- NCBI: proteins

Yeast ribonuclease (EC 3.1.14.1) is an enzyme. This enzyme catalyses the following chemical reaction

Exonucleolytic cleavage to nucleoside 3'-phosphates

This enzyme is similar RNase U4.
