= Ribonuclease P4 =

Identifiers
- EC no.: 3.1.26.7

Databases
- IntEnz: IntEnz view
- BRENDA: BRENDA entry
- ExPASy: NiceZyme view
- KEGG: KEGG entry
- MetaCyc: metabolic pathway
- PRIAM: profile
- PDB structures: RCSB PDB PDBe PDBsum
Search
- PMC: articles
- PubMed: articles
- NCBI: proteins

Ribonuclease P4 (EC 3.1.26.7) is an enzyme. This enzyme catalyses the following chemical reaction

Endonucleolytic cleavage of RNA, removing 3'-extranucleotides from tRNA precursor
