= List of EC numbers (EC 6) =

This list contains a list of EC numbers for the sixth group, EC 6, ligases, placed in numerical order as determined by the Nomenclature Committee of the International Union of Biochemistry and Molecular Biology. All official information is tabulated at the website of the committee. The database is developed and maintained by Andrew McDonald.

== EC 6.1: Forming Carbon-Oxygen Bonds ==
=== EC 6.1.1: Ligases Forming Aminoacyl-tRNA and Related Compounds (Aminoacyl tRNA synthetase) ===
- EC 6.1.1.1: tyrosine—tRNA ligase
- EC 6.1.1.2: tryptophan—tRNA ligase
- EC 6.1.1.3: threonine—tRNA ligase
- EC 6.1.1.4: leucine—tRNA ligase
- EC 6.1.1.5: isoleucine—tRNA ligase
- EC 6.1.1.6: lysine—tRNA ligase
- EC 6.1.1.7: alanine—tRNA ligase
- EC 6.1.1.8: Deleted
- EC 6.1.1.9: valine—tRNA ligase
- EC 6.1.1.10: methionine—tRNA ligase
- EC 6.1.1.11: serine—tRNA ligase
- EC 6.1.1.12: aspartate—tRNA ligase
- EC 6.1.1.13: D-alanine—poly(phosphoribitol) ligase
- EC 6.1.1.14: glycine—tRNA ligase
- EC 6.1.1.15: proline—tRNA ligase
- EC 6.1.1.16: cysteine—tRNA ligase
- EC 6.1.1.17: glutamate—tRNA ligase
- EC 6.1.1.18: glutamine—tRNA ligase
- EC 6.1.1.19: arginine—tRNA ligase
- EC 6.1.1.20: phenylalanine—tRNA ligase
- EC 6.1.1.21: histidine—tRNA ligase
- EC 6.1.1.22: asparagine—tRNA ligase
- EC 6.1.1.23: aspartate—tRNA^{Asn} ligase
- EC 6.1.1.24: glutamate—tRNA^{Gln} ligase
- EC 6.1.1.25: The tRNA^{Pyl} is now known only to be charged with pyrrolysine (cf. EC 6.1.1.26)
- EC 6.1.1.26: pyrrolysine—tRNA^{Pyl} ligase
- EC 6.1.1.27: O-phospho-L-serine—tRNA ligase
- EC 6.1.1.28: "proline/cysteine—tRNA ligase". Later published work having demonstrated that this was not a genuine enzyme, EC 6.1.1.28 was withdrawn at the public-review stage before being made official.

=== EC 6.1.2: Acid—alcohol ligases (ester synthases) ===
- EC 6.1.2.1: D-alanine—(R)-lactate ligase
- EC 6.1.2.2: nebramycin 5′ synthase

=== EC 6.1.3: Cyclo-ligases ===
- EC 6.1.3.1: olefin β-lactone synthetase

== EC 6.2: Forming Carbon-Sulfur Bonds ==
=== EC 6.2.1: Acid-Thiol Ligases ===
- EC 6.2.1.1: acetate—CoA ligase
- EC 6.2.1.2: medium-chain acyl-CoA ligase
- EC 6.2.1.3: long-chain-fatty-acid—CoA ligase
- EC 6.2.1.4: succinate—CoA ligase (GDP-forming)
- EC 6.2.1.5: succinate—CoA ligase (ADP-forming)
- EC 6.2.1.6: glutarate—CoA ligase
- EC 6.2.1.7: cholate—CoA ligase
- EC 6.2.1.8: oxalate—CoA ligase
- EC 6.2.1.9: malate—CoA ligase
- EC 6.2.1.10: carboxylic acid—CoA ligase (GDP-forming)
- EC 6.2.1.11: biotin—CoA ligase
- EC 6.2.1.12: 4-coumarate—CoA ligase
- EC 6.2.1.13: acetate—CoA ligase (ADP-forming)
- EC 6.2.1.14: 6-carboxyhexanoate—CoA ligase
- EC 6.2.1.15: arachidonate—CoA ligase
- EC 6.2.1.16: acetoacetate—CoA ligase
- EC 6.2.1.17: propionate—CoA ligase
- EC 6.2.1.18: citrate—CoA ligase
- EC 6.2.1.19: long-chain-fatty-acid—protein ligase
- EC 6.2.1.20: long-chain-fatty-acid—[acyl-carrier-protein] ligase
- EC 6.2.1.21: Activity covered by EC 6.2.1.30, phenylacetate—CoA ligase
- EC 6.2.1.22: [citrate (pro-3S)-lyase] ligase
- EC 6.2.1.23: dicarboxylate—CoA ligase
- EC 6.2.1.24: phytanate—CoA ligase
- EC 6.2.1.25: benzoate—CoA ligase
- EC 6.2.1.26: o-succinylbenzoate—CoA ligase
- EC 6.2.1.27: 4-hydroxybenzoate—CoA ligase
- EC 6.2.1.28: 3α,7α-dihydroxy-5β-cholestanate—CoA ligase
- EC 6.2.1.29: Deleted, identical to EC 6.2.1.7, cholate—CoA ligase
- EC 6.2.1.30: phenylacetate—CoA ligase
- EC 6.2.1.31: 2-furoate—CoA ligase
- EC 6.2.1.32: anthranilate—CoA ligase
- EC 6.2.1.33: 4-chlorobenzoate—CoA ligase
- EC 6.2.1.34: trans-feruloyl—CoA synthase
- EC 6.2.1.35: acetate—[acyl-carrier protein] ligase
- EC 6.2.1.36: 3-hydroxypropionyl-CoA synthase
- EC 6.2.1.37: 3-hydroxybenzoate—CoA ligase
- EC 6.2.1.38: (2,2,3-trimethyl-5-oxocyclopent-3-enyl)acetyl-CoA synthase
- EC 6.2.1.39: [butirosin acyl-carrier protein]—L-glutamate ligase
- EC 6.2.1.40: 4-hydroxybutyrate—CoA ligase (AMP-forming)
- EC 6.2.1.41: 3-[(3aS,4S,7aS)-7a-methyl-1,5-dioxo-octahydro-1H-inden-4-yl]propanoate—CoA ligase
- EC 6.2.1.42: 3-oxocholest-4-en-26-oate—CoA ligase
- EC 6.2.1.43: 2-hydroxy-7-methoxy-5-methyl-1-naphthoate—CoA ligase
- EC 6.2.1.44: 3-(methylthio)propionyl—CoA ligase
- EC 6.2.1.45: E1 ubiquitin-activating enzyme
- EC 6.2.1.46: L-allo-isoleucine—holo-[CmaA peptidyl-carrier protein] ligase
- EC 6.2.1.47: medium-chain-fatty-acid—[acyl-carrier-protein] ligase
- EC 6.2.1.48: carnitine—CoA ligase
- EC 6.2.1.49: long-chain fatty acid adenylyltransferase FadD28
- EC 6.2.1.50: 4-hydroxybenzoate adenylyltransferase FadD22
- EC 6.2.1.51: 4-hydroxyphenylalkanoate adenylyltransferase FadD29
- EC 6.2.1.52: L-firefly luciferin—CoA ligase
- EC 6.2.1.53: L-proline—[L-prolyl-carrier protein] ligase
- EC 6.2.1.54: D-alanine—[D-alanyl-carrier protein] ligase
- EC 6.2.1.55: E1 SAMP-activating enzyme
- EC 6.2.1.56: 4-hydroxybutyrate—CoA ligase (ADP-forming)
- EC 6.2.1.57: long-chain fatty acid adenylase/transferase FadD23
- EC 6.2.1.58: isophthalate—CoA ligase
- EC 6.2.1.59: long-chain fatty acid adenylase/transferase FadD26
- EC 6.2.1.60: marinolic acid—CoA ligase
- EC 6.2.1.61: salicylate—[aryl-carrier protein] ligase
- EC 6.2.1.62: 3,4-dihydroxybenzoate—[aryl-carrier protein] ligase
- EC 6.2.1.63: L-arginine—[L-arginyl-carrier protein] ligase
- EC 6.2.1.64: E1 NEDD8-activating enzyme
- EC 6.2.1.65: salicylate—CoA ligase
- EC 6.2.1.66: glyine—[glycyl-carrier protein] ligase
- EC 6.2.1.67: L-alanine—[L-alanyl-carrier protein] ligase
- EC 6.2.1.68: L-glutamate—[L-glutamyl-carrier protein] ligase
- EC 6.2.1.69: L-cysteine—[L-cysteinyl-carrier protein] ligase
- EC 6.2.1.70: L-threonine—[L-threonyl-carrier protein] ligase
- EC 6.2.1.71: 2,3-dihydroxybenzoate—[aryl-carrier protein] ligase
- EC 6.2.1.72: L-serine—[L-seryl-carrier protein] ligase
- EC 6.2.1.73: L-tryptophan—[L-tryptophyl-carrier protein] ligase
- EC 6.2.1.74: 3-amino-5-hydroxybenzoate—[acyl-carrier protein] ligase
- EC 6.2.1.75: indoleacetate—CoA ligase
- EC 6.2.1.76: malonate—CoA ligase *

=== EC 6.2.2: Amide—thiol ligases ===
- EC 6.2.2.1: thioglycine synthase
- EC 6.2.2.2: oxazoline synthase
- EC 6.2.2.3: thiazoline synthase

== EC 6.3: Forming Carbon-Nitrogen Bonds ==
=== EC 6.3.1: Acid—Ammonia (or Amine) Ligases (Amide Synthases) ===
- EC 6.3.1.1: aspartate—ammonia ligase
- EC 6.3.1.2: glutamine synthetase
- EC 6.3.1.3: Now EC 6.3.4.13, phosphoribosylamine—glycine ligase
- EC 6.3.1.4: aspartate—ammonia ligase (ADP-forming)
- EC 6.3.1.5: NAD^{+} synthase
- EC 6.3.1.6: glutamate—ethylamine ligase
- EC 6.3.1.7: 4-methyleneglutamate—ammonia ligase
- EC 6.3.1.8: glutathionylspermidine synthase
- EC 6.3.1.9: trypanothione synthase
- EC 6.3.1.10: adenosylcobinamide-phosphate synthase
- EC 6.3.1.11: glutamate—putrescine ligase
- EC 6.3.1.12: D-aspartate ligase
- EC 6.3.1.13: L-cysteine:1D-myo-inositol 2-amino-2-deoxy-α-D-glucopyranoside ligase
- EC 6.3.1.14: diphthine—ammonia ligase
- EC 6.3.1.15: 8-demethylnovobiocic acid synthase
- EC 6.3.1.16: The enzyme was discovered at the public-review stage to have been misclassified and so was withdrawn. See EC 6.3.3.6, carbapenam-3-carboxylate synthase
- EC 6.3.1.17: β-citrylglutamate synthase
- EC 6.3.1.18: γ-glutamylanilide synthase
- EC 6.3.1.19: prokaryotic ubiquitin-like protein ligase
- EC 6.3.1.20: lipoate—protein ligase
- EC 6.3.1.21: phosphoribosylglycinamide formyltransferase 2

=== EC 6.3.2: Acid—Amino-Acid Ligases (Peptide Synthases) ===
- EC 6.3.2.1: pantoate—β-alanine ligase (AMP-forming)
- EC 6.3.2.2: glutamate—cysteine ligase
- EC 6.3.2.3: glutathione synthase
- EC 6.3.2.4: D-alanine—D-alanine ligase
- EC 6.3.2.5: phosphopantothenate—cysteine ligase (CTP)
- EC 6.3.2.6: phosphoribosylaminoimidazolesuccinocarboxamide synthase
- EC 6.3.2.7: UDP-N-acetylmuramoyl-L-alanyl-D-glutamate—L-lysine ligase
- EC 6.3.2.8: UDP-N-acetylmuramate—L-alanine ligase
- EC 6.3.2.9: UDP-N-acetylmuramoyl-L-alanine—D-glutamate ligase
- EC 6.3.2.10: UDP-N-acetylmuramoyl-tripeptide—D-alanyl-D-alanine ligase
- EC 6.3.2.11: carnosine synthase
- EC 6.3.2.12: dihydrofolate synthase
- EC 6.3.2.13: UDP-N-acetylmuramoyl-L-alanyl-D-glutamate—2,6-diaminopimelate ligase
- EC 6.3.2.14: enterobactin synthase
- EC 6.3.2.15: Deleted, The activity observed is due to EC 6.3.2.10, UDP-N-acetylmuramoyl-tripeptideD-alanyl-D-alanine ligase
- EC 6.3.2.16: D-alanine—alanyl-poly(glycerolphosphate) ligase
- EC 6.3.2.17: tetrahydrofolate synthase
- EC 6.3.2.18: γ-glutamylhistamine synthase
- EC 6.3.2.19: The ubiquitinylation process is now known to be performed by several enzymes in sequence, starting with EC 6.2.1.45 (ubiquitin-activating enzyme E1) and followed by several transfer reactions, including those of EC 2.3.2.23 (E2 ubiquitin-conjugating enzyme) and EC 2.3.2.27 (RING-type E3 ubiquitin transferase)
- EC 6.3.2.20: indoleacetate—lysine synthetase
- EC 6.3.2.21: [[The reaction is performed by the sequential action of EC 6.2.1.45 (ubiquitin-activating enzyme E1), several ubiquitin transferases and finally by EC 2.3.2.27 (ubiquitin transferase RING E3 (calmodulin-selective))|The reaction is performed by the sequential action of EC 6.2.1.45 (ubiquitin-activating enzyme E1), several ubiquitin transferases and finally by EC 2.3.2.27 [ubiquitin transferase RING E3 (calmodulin-selective)]]]
- EC 6.3.2.22: Now EC 6.3.1.14, diphthine—ammonia ligase.
- EC 6.3.2.23: homoglutathione synthase
- EC 6.3.2.24: tyrosine—arginine ligase
- EC 6.3.2.25: tubulin—tyrosine ligase
- EC 6.3.2.26: N-(5-amino-5-carboxypentanoyl)-L-cysteinyl-D-valine synthase
- EC 6.3.2.27: [[The activity is covered by two independent enzymes, EC 6.3.2.38 N^2-citryl-N^6-acetyl-N^6-hydroxylysine synthase, and EC 6.3.2.39, aerobactin synthase|The activity is covered by two independent enzymes, EC 6.3.2.38 N^{2}-citryl-N^{6}-acetyl-N^{6}-hydroxylysine synthase, and EC 6.3.2.39, aerobactin synthase]]
- EC 6.3.2.28: Now EC 6.3.2.49, L-alanine-L-anticapsin ligase
- EC 6.3.2.29: cyanophycin synthase (L-aspartate-adding)
- EC 6.3.2.30: cyanophycin synthase (L-arginine-adding)
- EC 6.3.2.31: coenzyme F_{420}-0:L-glutamate ligase
- EC 6.3.2.32: coenzyme γ-F_{420}-2:α-L-glutamate ligase
- EC 6.3.2.33: tetrahydrosarcinapterin synthase
- EC 6.3.2.34: coenzyme F_{420}-0:L-glutamate ligase
- EC 6.3.2.35: D-alanine—D-serine ligase
- EC 6.3.2.36: 4-phosphopantoate—β-alanine ligase
- EC 6.3.2.37: UDP-N-acetylmuramoyl-L-alanyl-D-glutamate—D-lysine ligase
- EC 6.3.2.38: N^{2}-citryl-N^{6}-acetyl-N^{6}-hydroxylysine synthase
- EC 6.3.2.39: aerobactin synthase
- EC 6.3.2.40: cyclopeptine synthase
- EC 6.3.2.41: N-acetylaspartylglutamate synthase
- EC 6.3.2.42: N-acetylaspartylglutamylglutamate synthase
- EC 6.3.2.43: [amino-group carrier protein]—L-2-aminoadipate ligase
- EC 6.3.2.44: pantoate—β-alanine ligase (ADP-forming)
- EC 6.3.2.45: UDP-N-acetylmuramate—L-alanyl-γ-D-glutamyl-meso-2,6-diaminoheptanedioate ligase
- EC 6.3.2.46: fumarate—(S)-2,3-diaminopropanoate ligase
- EC 6.3.2.47: dapdiamide synthase
- EC 6.3.2.48: L-arginine-specific L-amino acid ligase
- EC 6.3.2.49: L-alanine—L-anticapsin ligase
- EC 6.3.2.50: tenuazonic acid synthetase
- EC 6.3.2.51: phosphopantothenate—cysteine ligase (ATP)
- EC 6.3.2.52: jasmonoyl—L-amino acid ligase
- EC 6.3.2.53: UDP-N-acetylmuramoyl-L-alanine—L-glutamate ligase
- EC 6.3.2.54: L-2,3-diaminopropanoate—citrate ligase
- EC 6.3.2.55: 2-[(L-alanin-3-ylcarbamoyl)methyl]-3-(2-aminoethylcarbamoyl)-2-hydroxypropanoate synthase
- EC 6.3.2.56: staphyloferrin B synthase
- EC 6.3.2.57: staphyloferrin A synthase
- EC 6.3.2.58: D-ornithine—citrate ligase
- EC 6.3.2.59: 3-methyl-D-ornithine—L-lysine ligase
- EC 6.3.2.60: glutamate—[amino group carrier protein] ligase
- EC 6.3.2.61: tubulin-glutamate ligase
- EC 6.3.2.62: β-tubulin-glutamate ligase

=== EC 6.3.3: Cyclo-Ligases ===
- EC 6.3.3.1: phosphoribosylformylglycinamidine cyclo-ligase
- EC 6.3.3.2: 5-formyltetrahydrofolate cyclo-ligase
- EC 6.3.3.3: dethiobiotin synthase
- EC 6.3.3.4: (carboxyethyl)arginine β-lactam-synthase
- EC 6.3.3.5: O-ureido-D-serine cyclo-ligase
- EC 6.3.3.6: carbapenam-3-carboxylate synthase
- EC 6.3.3.7: Ni-sirohydrochlorin a,c-diamide reductive cyclase

=== EC 6.3.4: Other Carbon-Nitrogen Ligases ===
- EC 6.3.4.1: Now included in EC 6.3.5.2, GMP synthase (glutamine-hydrolysing)
- EC 6.3.4.2: CTP synthase (glutamine hydrolysing)
- EC 6.3.4.3: formate—tetrahydrofolate ligase
- EC 6.3.4.4: adenylosuccinate synthase
- EC 6.3.4.5: argininosuccinate synthase
- EC 6.3.4.6: urea carboxylase
- EC 6.3.4.7: ribose-5-phosphate—ammonia ligase
- EC 6.3.4.8: imidazoleacetate—phosphoribosyldiphosphate ligase
- EC 6.3.4.9: biotin—[methylmalonyl-CoA-carboxytransferase] ligase
- EC 6.3.4.10: biotin—[methylmalonyl-CoA-carboxytransferase] ligase
- EC 6.3.4.11: biotin—[methylcrotonoyl-CoA-carboxylase] ligase
- EC 6.3.4.12: glutamate—methylamine ligase
- EC 6.3.4.13: phosphoribosylamine—glycine ligase
- EC 6.3.4.14: biotin carboxylase
- EC 6.3.4.15: biotin—[biotin carboxyl-carrier protein] ligase
- EC 6.3.4.16: carbamoyl-phosphate synthase (ammonia)
- EC 6.3.4.17: formate—dihydrofolate ligase
- EC 6.3.4.18: 5-(carboxyamino)imidazole ribonucleotide synthase
- EC 6.3.4.19: tRNA^{Ile}-lysidine synthase
- EC 6.3.4.20: 7-cyano-7-deazaguanine synthase
- EC 6.3.4.21: nicotinate phosphoribosyltransferase
- EC 6.3.4.22: tRNA^{Ile2}-agmatinylcytidine synthase
- EC 6.3.4.23: formate—phosphoribosylaminoimidazolecarboxamide ligase
- EC 6.3.4.24: tyramine—L-glutamate ligase
- EC 6.3.4.25: 2-amino-2′-deoxyadenylo-succinate synthase

=== EC 6.3.5: Carbon-nitrogen ligases with glutamine as amido-N-donor ===
- EC 6.3.5.1: NAD^{+} synthase (glutamine-hydrolysing)
- EC 6.3.5.2: GMP synthase (glutamine-hydrolysing)
- EC 6.3.5.3: phosphoribosylformylglycinamidine synthase
- EC 6.3.5.4: asparagine synthase (glutamine-hydrolysing)
- EC 6.3.5.5: carbamoyl-phosphate synthase (glutamine-hydrolysing)
- EC 6.3.5.6: asparaginyl-tRNA synthase (glutamine-hydrolysing)
- EC 6.3.5.7: glutaminyl-tRNA synthase (glutamine-hydrolysing)
- EC 6.3.5.8: Now EC 2.6.1.85, aminodeoxychorismate synthase. As ATP is not hydrolysed during the reaction, the classification of the enzyme as a ligase was incorrect
- EC 6.3.5.9: hydrogenobyrinic acid a,c-diamide synthase (glutamine-hydrolysing)
- EC 6.3.5.10: adenosylcobyric acid synthase (glutamine-hydrolysing)
- EC 6.3.5.11: cobyrinate a,c-diamide synthase
- EC 6.3.5.12: Ni-sirohydrochlorin a,c-diamide synthase
- EC 6.3.5.13: lipid II isoglutaminyl synthase (glutamine-hydrolysing)

== EC 6.4: Forming Carbon-Carbon Bonds ==
=== EC 6.4.1: Ligases that form carbon-carbon bonds (only sub-subclass identified to date) ===
- EC 6.4.1.1: pyruvate carboxylase
- EC 6.4.1.2: acetyl-CoA carboxylase
- EC 6.4.1.3: propionyl-CoA carboxylase
- EC 6.4.1.4: methylcrotonoyl-CoA carboxylase
- EC 6.4.1.5: geranoyl-CoA carboxylase
- EC 6.4.1.6: acetone carboxylase
- EC 6.4.1.7: 2-oxoglutarate carboxylase
- EC 6.4.1.8: acetophenone carboxylase
- EC 6.4.1.9: coenzyme F_{430} synthetase

== EC 6.5: Forming Phosphoric Ester Bonds ==
=== EC 6.5.1: Ligases that form phosphoric-ester bonds (only sub-subclass identified to date) ===
- EC 6.5.1.1: DNA ligase (ATP)
- EC 6.5.1.2: DNA ligase (NAD^{+})
- EC 6.5.1.3: RNA ligase (ATP)
- EC 6.5.1.4: RNA 3′-terminal-phosphate cyclase (ATP)
- EC 6.5.1.5: RNA 3′-terminal-phosphate cyclase (GTP)
- EC 6.5.1.6: DNA ligase (ATP or NAD^{+})
- EC 6.5.1.7: DNA ligase (ATP, ADP or GTP)
- EC 6.5.1.8: 3′-phosphate/5′-hydroxy nucleic acid ligase
- EC 6.5.1.9: cyclic 2,3-diphosphoglycerate synthase

== EC 6.6: Forming Nitrogen-Metal Bonds ==
=== EC 6.6.1: Forming Coordination Complexes ===
- EC 6.6.1.1: magnesium chelatase
- EC 6.6.1.2: cobaltochelatase

== EC 6.7: Forming nitrogen-nitrogen bonds ==
=== EC 6.7.1: Forming diazo bonds ===
- EC 6.7.1.1: 3-amino-2-hydroxy-4-methoxybenzoate
