= Thiokinase =

Class of enzymes

A thiokinase is a ligase that synthesizes CoA thioesters. They are classified under EC number 6.2, but often have primary names without "thiokinase" in the title.

Types include:

- Acetate-CoA ligase (ADP-forming)
- Butyrate-CoA ligase
- Citrate-CoA ligase
- Malate-CoA ligase
- Succinate-CoA ligase (ADP-forming)
- Succinate-CoA ligase (GDP-forming)
