= Substrate-level phosphorylation =

Metabolic reaction

Substrate-level phosphorylation exemplified with the conversion of ADP to ATP

Substrate-level phosphorylation is a metabolic reaction that results in the production of ATP or GTP supported by the energy released from another high-energy bond that leads to phosphorylation of ADP or GDP to ATP or GTP (note that the reaction catalyzed by creatine kinase is not considered as "substrate-level phosphorylation"). This process uses some of the released chemical energy, namely the Gibbs free energy, to transfer a phosphoryl (PO_{3}) group to ADP or GDP. Substrate-level phosphorylation occurs in glycolysis and in the citric acid cycle.

Unlike oxidative phosphorylation, oxidation and phosphorylation are not coupled in the process of substrate-level phosphorylation, and reactive intermediates are most often gained in the course of oxidation processes in catabolism. Most ATP is generated by oxidative phosphorylation in aerobic or anaerobic respiration while substrate-level phosphorylation provides a quicker, less efficient source of ATP, independent of external electron acceptors. This is the case in human erythrocytes, which have no mitochondria, and in oxygen-depleted muscle.

Substrate-level phosphorylation occurs in the cytoplasm of cells during glycolysis and in mitochondria during the Krebs cycle. In the pay-off phase of glycolysis, a net of 2 ATP are produced by substrate-level phosphorylation.

== Glycolysis ==
The first substrate-level phosphorylation occurs after the conversion of 3-phosphoglyceraldehyde and P_{i} and NAD^{+} to 1,3-bisphosphoglycerate via glyceraldehyde 3-phosphate dehydrogenase. 1,3-bisphosphoglycerate is then dephosphorylated via phosphoglycerate kinase, producing 3-phosphoglycerate and ATP through a substrate-level phosphorylation.

The second substrate-level phosphorylation occurs by dephosphorylating phosphoenolpyruvate, catalyzed by pyruvate kinase, producing pyruvate and ATP.

During the preparatory phase, each 6-carbon glucose molecule is broken into two 3-carbon molecules. Thus, in glycolysis substrate-level phosphorylation produces 4 ATP molecules. However, the prior preparatory phase consumes 2 ATP molecules, so the net yield in glycolysis is 2 ATP molecules. 2 molecules of NADH are also produced and can be used in oxidative phosphorylation to generate more ATP.

== Mitochondria ==
ATP can be generated by substrate-level phosphorylation in mitochondria in a pathway that is independent from the proton motive force. In the matrix there are three reactions capable of substrate-level phosphorylation, utilizing either phosphoenolpyruvate carboxykinase or succinate-CoA ligase, or monofunctional C1-tetrahydrofolate synthase.

=== Phosphoenolpyruvate carboxykinase ===
Mitochondrial phosphoenolpyruvate carboxykinase is thought to participate in the transfer of the phosphorylation potential from the matrix to the cytosol and vice versa. However, it is strongly favored towards GTP hydrolysis, thus it is not really considered as an important source of intra-mitochondrial substrate-level phosphorylation.

=== Succinate-CoA ligase ===
Succinate-CoA ligase is a heterodimer composed of an invariant α-subunit and a substrate-specific ß-subunit, encoded by either SUCLA2 or SUCLG2. This combination results in either an ADP-forming succinate-CoA ligase (A-SUCL, EC 6.2.1.5) or a GDP-forming succinate-CoA ligase (G-SUCL, EC 6.2.1.4). The ADP-forming succinate-CoA ligase is potentially the only matrix enzyme generating ATP in the absence of a proton motive force, capable of maintaining matrix ATP levels under energy-limited conditions, such as transient hypoxia.

=== Monofunctional C1-tetrahydrofolate synthase ===
This enzyme is encoded by MTHFD1L and reversibly interconverts ADP + phosphate + 10-formyltetrahydrofolate to ATP + formate + tetrahydrofolate (EC 6.3.4.3).

== Other mechanisms ==
In working skeletal muscles and the brain, phosphocreatine is stored as a readily available high-energy phosphate supply, and the enzyme creatine kinase transfers a phosphate from phosphocreatine to ADP to produce ATP. Then the ATP can be utilized for doing useful work by cellular processes. The creatine kinase reaction is sometimes erroneously considered to be substrate-level phosphorylation, although it is a transphosphorylation.

== Importance of substrate-level phosphorylation in anoxia ==
During anoxia, provision of ATP by substrate-level phosphorylation in the matrix is important not only as a mere means of energy, but also to prevent mitochondria from straining glycolytic ATP reserves by maintaining the adenine nucleotide translocator in ‘forward mode’ carrying ATP towards the cytosol.

== Oxidative phosphorylation ==
An alternative method used to create ATP is through oxidative phosphorylation, which takes place during cellular respiration. This process utilizes the oxidation of NADH to NAD^{+}, yielding 3 ATP, and of FADH_{2} to FAD, yielding 2 ATP. The potential energy stored as an electrochemical gradient of protons (H^{+}) across the inner mitochondrial membrane is required to generate ATP from ADP and P_{i} (inorganic phosphate molecule), a key difference from substrate-level phosphorylation. This gradient is exploited by ATP synthase acting as a pore, allowing H^{+} from the mitochondrial intermembrane space to move down its electrochemical gradient into the matrix and coupling the release of free energy to ATP synthesis. Conversely, electron transfer provides the energy required to actively pump H^{+} out of the matrix.
