= M23 RNA motif =

M23
- Consensus secondary structure and sequence conservation of M23 RNA

Identifiers
- Symbol: M23
- Rfam: RF03006

Other data
- RNA type: Gene; sRNA
- SO: SO:0001263
- PDB structures: PDBe

The M23 RNA motif is a conserved RNA structure that was discovered by bioinformatics. M23 motif RNAs are found in Clostridia.

M23 RNAs are generally located upstream of protein-coding genes, and therefore they might function as cis-regulatory elements. Most M23 RNAs are located upstream of M23 peptidase genes, but one is upstream of a gene whose product is NAD synthetase. However, there were two cases where no downstream gene was located. While these cases had technical explanations not related to biology, it is possible they the technical explanations do not apply, and that the M23 RNA motif functions as a small RNA.

An M23 RNA was observed to apparently bind a molecule in yeast extract. However, this putative molecule has not (as of 2018) been identified.
