= Lysine—tRNA(Pyl) ligase =

lysine-tRNA(Pyl) ligase

Identifiers
- EC no.: 6.1.1.25
- CAS no.: 782472-12-2

Databases
- IntEnz: IntEnz view
- BRENDA: BRENDA entry
- ExPASy: NiceZyme view
- KEGG: KEGG entry
- MetaCyc: metabolic pathway
- PRIAM: profile
- PDB structures: RCSB PDB PDBe PDBsum
- Gene Ontology: AmiGO / QuickGO
Search
- PMC: articles
- PubMed: articles
- NCBI: proteins

In enzymology, a lysine-tRNAPyl ligase (EC 6.1.1.25) is an enzyme that catalyzes the chemical reaction

ATP + L-lysine + tRNAPyl $\rightleftharpoons$ AMP + diphosphate + L-lysyl-tRNAPyl

The 3 substrates of this enzyme are ATP, L-lysine, and tRNA(Pyl), whereas its 3 products are AMP, diphosphate, and L-lysyl-tRNA(Pyl).

This enzyme belongs to the family of ligases, to be specific those forming carbon-oxygen bonds in aminoacyl-tRNA and related compounds. The systematic name of this enzyme class is L-lysine:tRNAPyl ligase (AMP-forming).
