= Vand =

Vand may refer to:

- 129595 Vand (1997 VD), an asteroid
- D-alanine—(R)-lactate ligase, an enzyme
- Domenico Vandelli (1735–1816), Italian naturalist
- Nu Andromedae (ν And), a star
- Shri Guru Gobind Singh Ji Airport, serving Nanded, Maharashtra, India

== See also ==
- Andromeda V (And V), a galaxy
- 5 Andromedae (5 And), a star
