= FPGS =

FPGS may refer to:

- Folylpolyglutamate synthase, an enzyme
- Tetrahydrofolate synthase, an enzyme
