= 2-oxoglutarate carboxylase =

Class of enzymes

2-Oxoglutarate carboxylase

Identifiers
- EC no.: 6.4.1.7

Databases
- IntEnz: IntEnz view
- BRENDA: BRENDA entry
- ExPASy: NiceZyme view
- KEGG: KEGG entry
- MetaCyc: metabolic pathway
- PRIAM: profile
- PDB structures: RCSB PDB PDBe PDBsum
Search
- PMC: articles
- PubMed: articles
- NCBI: proteins

In enzymology, a 2-oxoglutarate carboxylase (EC 6.4.1.7) is an enzyme that catalyzes the chemical reaction

ATP + 2-oxoglutarate + HCO_{3}- $\rightleftharpoons$ ADP + phosphate + oxalosuccinate

The 3 substrates of this enzyme are ATP, 2-oxoglutarate, and HCO3-, whereas its 3 products are ADP, phosphate, and oxalosuccinate.

This enzyme belongs to the family of ligases, specifically those forming carbon-carbon bonds. The systematic name of this enzyme class is '. Other names in common use include oxalosuccinate synthetase', carboxylating factor for ICDH (incorrect), CFI, and OGC.
