= Gamma-glutamylhistamine synthase =

Class of enzymes

γ-Glutamylhistamine synthase

Identifiers
- EC no.: 6.3.2.18
- CAS no.: 82904-08-3

Databases
- IntEnz: IntEnz view
- BRENDA: BRENDA entry
- ExPASy: NiceZyme view
- KEGG: KEGG entry
- MetaCyc: metabolic pathway
- PRIAM: profile
- PDB structures: RCSB PDB PDBe PDBsum
- Gene Ontology: AmiGO / QuickGO
Search
- PMC: articles
- PubMed: articles
- NCBI: proteins

In enzymology, a γ-glutamylhistamine synthase (EC 6.3.2.18) is an enzyme that catalyzes the chemical reaction

ATP + L-glutamate + histamine $\rightleftharpoons$ products of ATP breakdown + N^{α}-γ-L-glutamylhistamine

The 3 substrates of this enzyme are ATP, L-glutamate, and histamine, whereas its two products are products of ATP breakdown and Nalpha-gamma-L-glutamylhistamine.

This enzyme belongs to the family of ligases, specifically those forming carbon-nitrogen bonds as acid-D-amino-acid ligases (peptide synthases). The systematic name of this enzyme class is L-glutamate:histamine ligase. Other names in common use include gamma-glutaminylhistamine synthetase, and gamma-GHA synthetase.
