= Indoleacetate—lysine synthetase =

Class of enzymes

Identifiers
- EC no.: 6.3.2.20
- CAS no.: 103537-15-1

Databases
- IntEnz: IntEnz view
- BRENDA: BRENDA entry
- ExPASy: NiceZyme view
- KEGG: KEGG entry
- MetaCyc: metabolic pathway
- PRIAM: profile
- PDB structures: RCSB PDB PDBe PDBsum
- Gene Ontology: AmiGO / QuickGO
Search
- PMC: articles
- PubMed: articles
- NCBI: proteins

In enzymology, an indoleacetate—lysine synthetase (EC 6.3.2.20) is an enzyme that catalyzes the chemical reaction

ATP + (indol-3-yl)acetate + L-lysine $\rightleftharpoons$ ADP + phosphate + N_{6}-[(indol-3-yl)acetyl]-L-lysine

The 3 substrates of this enzyme are ATP, (indol-3-yl)acetate, and L-lysine, whereas its 3 products are ADP, phosphate, and [[N6-[(indol-3-yl)acetyl]-L-lysine]].

This enzyme belongs to the family of ligases, specifically those forming carbon-nitrogen bonds as acid-D-amino-acid ligases (peptide synthases). The systematic name of this enzyme class is (indol-3-yl)acetate:L-lysine ligase (ADP-forming). This enzyme is also called indoleacetate:L-lysine ligase (ADP-forming).
