= Trypanothione synthase =

Class of enzymes

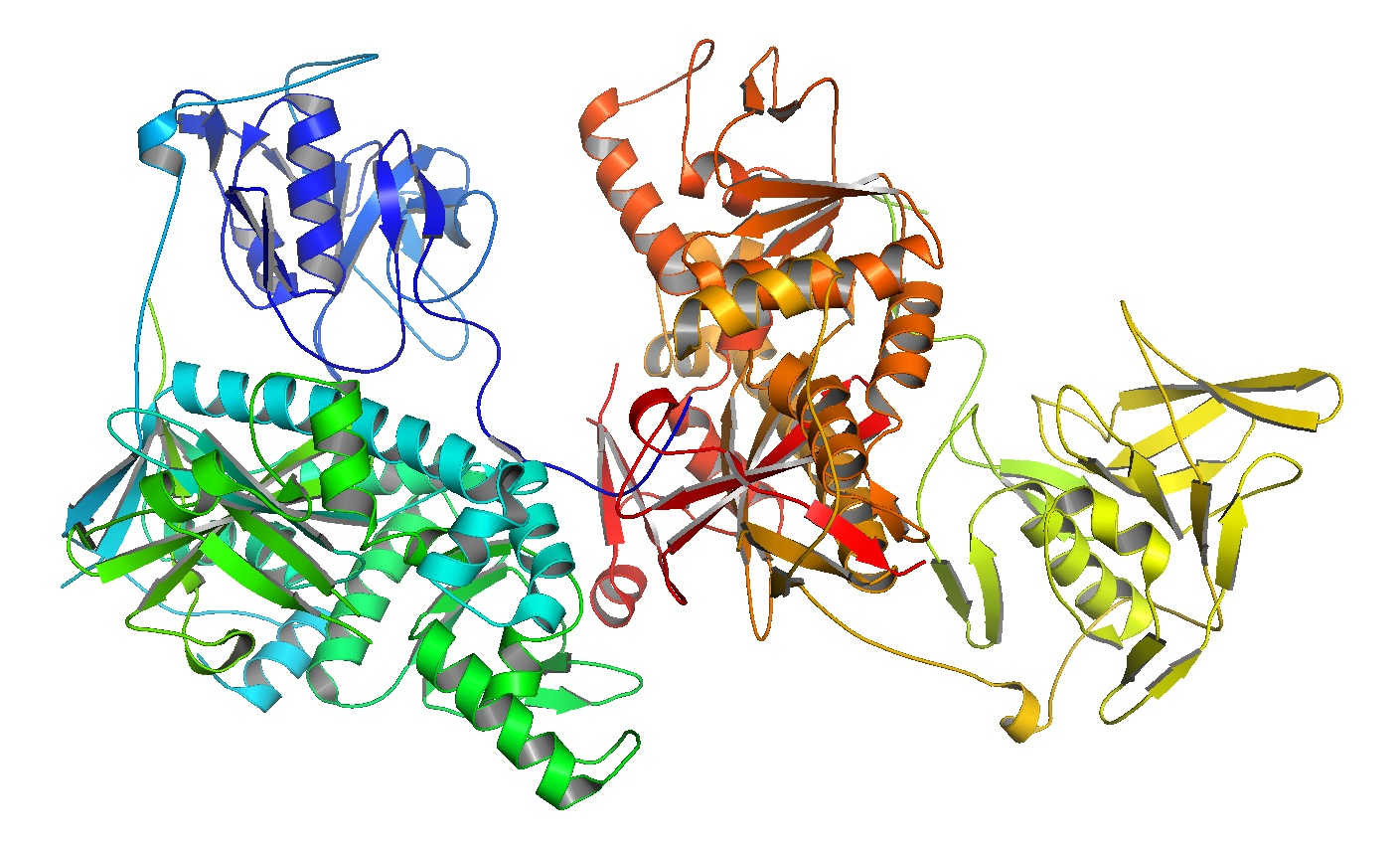

Identifiers
- EC no.: 6.3.1.9
- CAS no.: 130246-69-4

Databases
- BRENDA: enzyme data
- ExPASy: NiceZyme view
- KEGG: enzyme entry
- MetaCyc: metabolic pathway
- Rhea: reactions
- PDB structures: RCSB PDB PDBe PDBsum
- Gene Ontology: AmiGO / QuickGO
Search
- PMC: articles
- PubMed: articles
- NCBI: proteins

In enzymology, a trypanothione synthase (EC 6.3.1.9) is an enzyme that catalyzes the chemical reaction

glutathione + glutathionylspermidine + ATP $\rightleftharpoons$ N_{1},N_{8}-bis(glutathionyl)spermidine + ADP + phosphate

The 3 substrates of this enzyme are glutathione, glutathionylspermidine, and ATP, whereas its 3 products are N1,N8-bis(glutathionyl)spermidine, ADP, and phosphate.

This reaction is especially important for protozoa in the order kinetoplastida as the molecule of N1,N8-bis(glutathionyl)spermidine, also known as trypanothione, is homologous to the function of glutathione in most other prokaryotic and eukaryotic cells. This means that it is a key intermediate in maintaining thiol redox within the cell and defending against harmful oxidative effects in such protozoa.

This enzyme belongs to the family of ligases, specifically those forming carbon-nitrogen bonds as acid-D-ammonia (or amine) ligases (amide synthases). The systematic name of this enzyme class is glutathionylspermidine:glutathione ligase (ADP-forming).

== Structure ==
The active bifunctional enzyme of trypanothione synthase is found as a 74.4 KDa monomer consisting of 652 residues with two catalytic domains. Its C-terminal domain is a synthetase and has an ATP-grasp family fold that is usually found in carbon-nitrogen ligases. The N-terminal domain is a cysteine, histidine-dependent aminohydrolase amidase. Structurally the synthetase and amidase domains are bound together by three residues of Glu-650-Asp-651-Glu-652 through hydrogen bonding and salt bridge interactions with basic side chains in order for the protein to properly fold. These three residues also block the catalytic Cys-59 in the amidase domain.

It is currently known that the synthetase active site is shaped in the fashion of a triangular cavity that binds the three substrates such that the end of each molecule is nestled in a vertex of the triangle. The particular residues of Arg-553 and Arg-613 have been found to key for synthetic function, however further research into the structure of trypanothione synthase must be done in order to fully understand the enzyme's active sites.

== Function ==
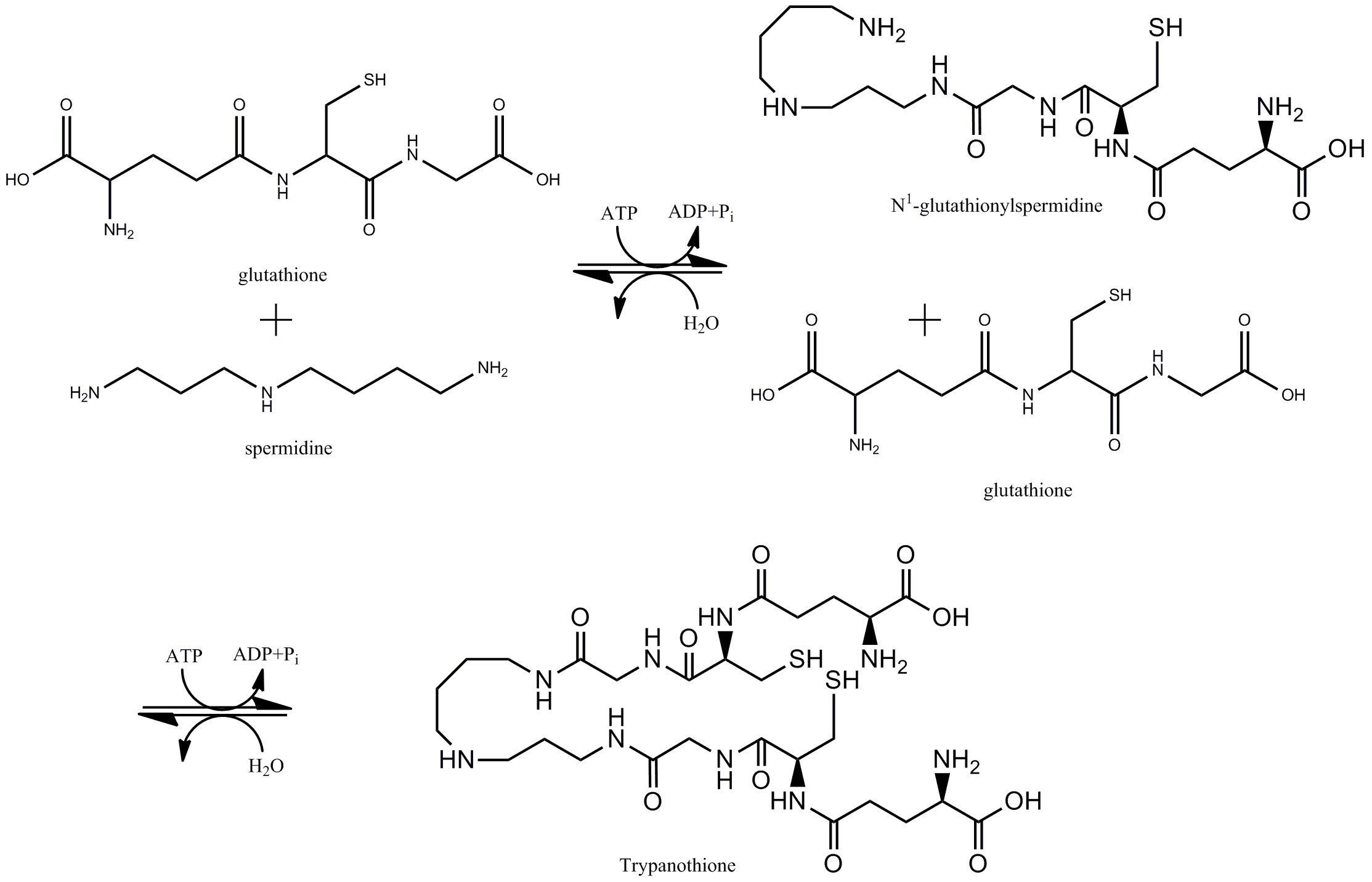
Synthesis of Trypanothione

The main function of trypanothione synthase is to use the free energy generated from ATP hydrolysis to conjugate glutathione and spermidine to form the intermediate of glutathionylspermidine and then the final product of trypanothione. It also catalyzes the reverse reaction as well, albeit at a much lower rate. Under conditions found to be the optimum for both the forward and backwards reactions, trypanothione synthase from trypanosoma cruzi was found to have an amidase activity that was only about 1% of the forwards synthetase activity. This low activity can be explained by the blocking of the catalytic Cys in the amidase active site in order for the protein to properly fold.

In parasitic kinetoplastids trypanothione synthase activity is key to survival. Due to the need for trypanothione in order to defend against oxidative stresses, and maintain thiol and ribonucleotide metabolism. It was observed that induced knockout of trypanothione synthase through RNA interference caused a reduced growth rate of twofold among trypanosoma brucei due to the immediate disruption of flux through thiol redox. In other similar experiments which observed cell death after knocking out trypanothione synthase, it was shown that after two hours of being exposed to hydrogen peroxide in order to mimic the oxidant attack of phagocytes, the cells which did not contain working trypanothione synthase had a much higher death rate than wild type T. brucei.

== Mechanism ==
The current believed mechanism for synthetase activity is that first glutathione and Mg^{2+}-ATP bind to the enzyme in a ternary complex where glutathione becomes activated by ATP and forms glutathionyl phosphate. ADP then leaves the active site and the activated phosphate still bound to the enzyme in what is equivalent to a substituted enzyme reacts with glutathionylspermidine to form trypanothione.

== Regulation ==
The regulation of trypanothione synthase is currently thought to be driven by conformational changes caused by allosteric interactions as the enzyme must regulate the relative levels of spermidine, glutathionylspermidine, glutathione and trypanothione in the cell. Evidence for this regulation is that the residues which allow the synthase domain to block the amidase active site are highly conserved among different species of kinetoplastids, indicating that they are key in the enzyme's function and that the binding of certain substrates might cause conformational shifts that would open up the amidase active site.

== Clinical Significance ==
Many diseases such as Human African trypanosomiasis, Nagana disease in cattle, and Chagas disease are caused by kinetoplastid parasites. Such diseases infect an estimated 15 to 20 million people per year worldwide and kill 100000 to 150000 of those infected. Current treatments for these diseases were generally made almost 100 years ago and in that time many of the parasites have developed resistance, in addition, many of the original treatments are highly toxic. Targeting trypanothione synthase could be a novel way of preventing and curing these diseases through disruption of the parasites' metabolism. Scientists believe that the thiol metabolic pathway is an especially good target for anti-parasitic drug production as trypanothione based thiol redox is absent in humans and it is thought that thiol redox is key in the mechanisms some parasites have in order to obtain drug resistance .
