= Glutamate—methylamine ligase =

Identifiers
- EC no.: 6.3.4.12
- CAS no.: 37318-69-7

Databases
- IntEnz: IntEnz view
- BRENDA: BRENDA entry
- ExPASy: NiceZyme view
- KEGG: KEGG entry
- MetaCyc: metabolic pathway
- PRIAM: profile
- PDB structures: RCSB PDB PDBe PDBsum
- Gene Ontology: AmiGO / QuickGO
Search
- PMC: articles
- PubMed: articles
- NCBI: proteins

In enzymology, a glutamate—methylamine ligase (EC 6.3.4.12) is an enzyme that catalyzes the chemical reaction

ATP + L-glutamate + methylamine $\rightleftharpoons$ ADP + phosphate + N_{5}-methyl-L-glutamine

The 3 substrates of this enzyme are ATP, L-glutamate, and methylamine, whereas its 3 products are ADP, phosphate, and N5-methyl-L-glutamine.

This enzyme belongs to the family of ligases, specifically those forming generic carbon-nitrogen bonds. The systematic name of this enzyme class is L-glutamate:methylamine ligase (ADP-forming). This enzyme is also called gamma-glutamylmethylamide synthetase.
