= Tyrosine—arginine ligase =

Class of enzymes

Identifiers
- EC no.: 6.3.2.24
- CAS no.: 116036-78-3

Databases
- IntEnz: IntEnz view
- BRENDA: BRENDA entry
- ExPASy: NiceZyme view
- KEGG: KEGG entry
- MetaCyc: metabolic pathway
- PRIAM: profile
- PDB structures: RCSB PDB PDBe PDBsum
- Gene Ontology: AmiGO / QuickGO
Search
- PMC: articles
- PubMed: articles
- NCBI: proteins

In enzymology, a tyrosine—arginine ligase (EC 6.3.2.24) is an enzyme that catalyzes the chemical reaction

ATP + L-tyrosine + L-arginine $\rightleftharpoons$ AMP + diphosphate + L-tyrosyl-L-arginine

The 3 substrates of this enzyme are ATP, L-tyrosine, and L-arginine, whereas its 3 products are AMP, diphosphate, and L-tyrosyl-L-arginine.

This enzyme belongs to the family of ligases, specifically those forming carbon-nitrogen bonds as acid-D-amino-acid ligases (peptide synthases). The systematic name of this enzyme class is L-tyrosine:L-arginine ligase (AMP-forming). Other names in common use include tyrosyl-arginine synthase, kyotorphin synthase, kyotorphin-synthesizing enzyme, and kyotorphin synthetase.
