= Trans-Feruloyl—CoA synthase =

trans-Feruloyl—CoA synthase

Identifiers
- EC no.: 6.2.1.34

Databases
- IntEnz: IntEnz view
- BRENDA: BRENDA entry
- ExPASy: NiceZyme view
- KEGG: KEGG entry
- MetaCyc: metabolic pathway
- PRIAM: profile
- PDB structures: RCSB PDB PDBe PDBsum
- Gene Ontology: AmiGO / QuickGO
Search
- PMC: articles
- PubMed: articles
- NCBI: proteins

trans-Feruloyl—CoA synthase (EC 6.2.1.34) is an enzyme that catalyzes the chemical reaction

ferulic acid + CoASH + ATP $\rightleftharpoons$ trans-feruloyl—CoA + products of ATP breakdown

The three substrates of this enzyme are ferulic acid, CoASH, and ATP, whereas its two products are trans-feruloyl—CoA and products of ATP breakdown.

This enzyme belongs to the family of ligases, specifically those forming carbon-sulfur bonds as acid-thiol ligases. The systematic name of this enzyme class is trans-ferulate:CoASH ligase (ATP-hydrolysing). This enzyme is also called trans-feruloyl—CoA synthetase.
