= 3-alpha,7-alpha-dihydroxy-5-beta-cholestanate—CoA ligase =

Class of enzymes

3-α,7-α-Dihydroxy-5-β-cholestanate—CoA ligase

Identifiers
- EC no.: 6.2.1.28
- CAS no.: 118732-03-9

Databases
- IntEnz: IntEnz view
- BRENDA: BRENDA entry
- ExPASy: NiceZyme view
- KEGG: KEGG entry
- MetaCyc: metabolic pathway
- PRIAM: profile
- PDB structures: RCSB PDB PDBe PDBsum
- Gene Ontology: AmiGO / QuickGO
Search
- PMC: articles
- PubMed: articles
- NCBI: proteins

In enzymology, a 3α,7α-dihydroxy-5β-cholestanate—CoA ligase (EC 6.2.1.28) is an enzyme that catalyzes the chemical reaction

ATP + (25R)-3alpha,7alpha-dihydroxy-5beta-cholestan-26-oate + CoA $\rightleftharpoons$ AMP + diphosphate + (25R)-3alpha,7alpha-dihydroxy-5beta-cholestanoyl-CoA

The 3 substrates of this enzyme are ATP, (25R)-3alpha,7alpha-dihydroxy-5beta-cholestan-26-oate, and CoA, whereas its 3 products are AMP, diphosphate, and (25R)-3alpha,7alpha-dihydroxy-5beta-cholestanoyl-CoA.

This enzyme belongs to the family of ligases, specifically those forming carbon-sulfur bonds as acid-thiol ligases. The systematic name of this enzyme class is (25R)-3alpha,7alpha-dihydroxy-5beta-cholestan-26-oate:CoA ligase (AMP-forming). Other names in common use include 3alpha,7alpha-dihydroxy-5beta-cholestanoyl coenzyme A synthetase, DHCA-CoA ligase, and 3alpha,7alpha-dihydroxy-5beta-cholestanate:CoA ligase (AMP-forming). This enzyme participates in bile acid biosynthesis.
