= Dethiobiotin synthase =

Class of enzymes

Identifiers
- EC no.: 6.3.3.3
- CAS no.: 37259-75-9

Databases
- IntEnz: IntEnz view
- BRENDA: BRENDA entry
- ExPASy: NiceZyme view
- KEGG: KEGG entry
- MetaCyc: metabolic pathway
- PRIAM: profile
- PDB structures: RCSB PDB PDBe PDBsum
- Gene Ontology: AmiGO / QuickGO
Search
- PMC: articles
- PubMed: articles
- NCBI: proteins

In enzymology, a dethiobiotin synthase (EC 6.3.3.3) is an enzyme that catalyzes the chemical reaction

ATP + 7,8-diaminononanoate + CO_{2} $\rightleftharpoons$ ADP + phosphate + dethiobiotin

The 3 substrates of this enzyme are ATP, 7,8-diaminononanoate, and CO_{2}, whereas its 3 products are ADP, phosphate, and dethiobiotin.

This enzyme belongs to the family of ligases, specifically the cyclo-ligases, which form carbon-nitrogen bonds. The systematic name of this enzyme class is 7,8-diaminononanoate:carbon-dioxide cyclo-ligase (ADP-forming). This enzyme is also called desthiobiotin synthase. This enzyme participates in biotin metabolism.

== Structural studies ==
As of late 2007, 14 structures have been solved for this class of enzymes, with PDB accession codes 1A82, 1BS1, 1BYI, 1DAD, 1DAE, 1DAF, 1DAG, 1DAH, 1DAI, 1DAK, 1DAM, 1DBS, 1DTS, and 2QMO.
