= Biotin—(acetyl-CoA-carboxylase) ligase =

Bacterial enzyme catalyzing biotin metabolism

Bifunctional ligase/repressor BirA
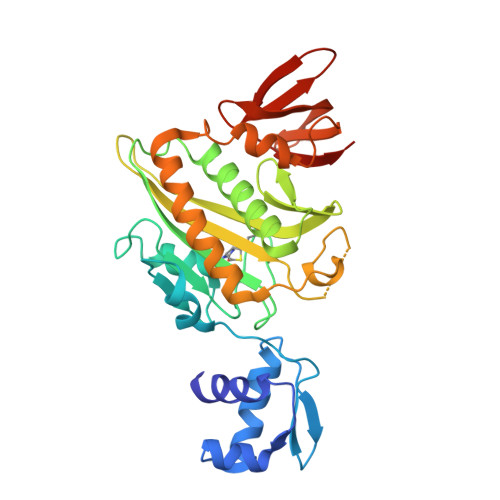
- Crystal structure of E-coli biotin repressor with bound biotin

Identifiers
- Organism: E. coli
- Symbol: birA
- Alt. symbols: bioR, dhbB
- Entrez: 948469
- Orthologs: NCBI: entry; OMA: entry
- PDB: 1BIA, 1BIB, 1HXD, 2EWN, 4WF2
- RefSeq (mRNA): NC_000913
- RefSeq (Prot): NP_418404
- UniProt: P06709
Search for
- Structures: Swiss-model
- Domains: InterPro

Biotin—[acetyl-CoA-carboxylase] ligase

Identifiers
- EC no.: 6.3.4.15
- CAS no.: 37340-95-7

Databases
- BRENDA: enzyme data
- ExPASy: NiceZyme view
- KEGG: enzyme entry
- MetaCyc: metabolic pathway
- Rhea: reactions
- PDB structures: RCSB PDB PDBe PDBsum
- Gene Ontology: AmiGO / QuickGO
Search
- PMC: articles
- PubMed: articles
- NCBI: proteins

Biotin—(acetyl-CoA-carboxylase) ligase, more commonly known as BirA, is a 35kD enzyme found in prokaryotes, most notably Escherichia coli. It plays a central role in the metabolism of biotin (also known as vitamin B7) by performing two distinct functions: it acts as a biotin protein ligase (EC 6.3.4.15), catalyzing the covalent attachment of biotin to its target proteins, and as a transcriptional repressor, controlling the expression of the biotin biosynthesis (bio-)operon.

Due to the high specificity of its ligase activity and the exceptional strength of the resulting biotin-avidin interaction - the binding of biotin and avidin is among the strongest noncovalent interactions known -, BirA has been extensively repurposed as a powerful tool in molecular biology, proteomics, and biotechnology. Engineered variants of BirA are foundational to techniques for site-specific protein labeling and proximity-dependent identification of protein interaction networks.

== Nomenclature and Classification ==
The systematic name of this enzyme class is biotin:apo-[acetyl-CoA:carbon-dioxide ligase (ADP-forming)] ligase (AMP-forming). Other names in common use include:

- birA (gene name)
- HLCS (gene name)
- HCS1 (gene name)
- biotin-[acetyl-CoA carboxylase] synthetase
- biotin-[acetyl coenzyme A carboxylase] synthetase
- acetyl coenzyme A holocarboxylase synthetase
- acetyl CoA holocarboxylase synthetase
- Biotin holoenzyme synthetase
- biotin:apocarboxylase ligase
- biotin—[acetyl-CoA-carboxylase] ligase

It belongs to the family of ligases, specifically those forming carbon-nitrogen bonds as acid-D-amino-acid ligases (peptide synthases).

== Biological Function in E. coli ==
In its native host, BirA acts as a homeostatic regulator of biotin. BirA's primary catalytic function is to attach a molecule of D-biotin to a specific lysine residue on an acceptor protein. This post-translational modification is essential for the function of biotin-dependent carboxylases. In E. coli, the sole natural substrate for BirA is the Biotin Carboxyl Carrier Protein (BCCP), a subunit of the enzyme Acetyl-CoA Carboxylase (ACC).

The biotinylated ACC is critical for the first step of fatty acid synthesis: the carboxylation of acetyl-CoA to produce malonyl-CoA. The reaction proceeds as follows:

Biotin + Apo-BCCP + ATP $\rightleftharpoons$ Holo-BCCP + AMP + PP_{i}

Without a functional BirA, BCCP remains in its apo- (unbiotinylated) form, rendering ACC inactive and halting fatty acid synthesis, which is lethal to the cell. BirA also functions as a DNA-binding protein that represses the transcription of the bio-operon (bioABCDE), which contains the genes for the biotin synthesis pathway. This regulatory function is allosterically controlled by the concentration of the catalytic intermediate, biotinyl-5'-AMP.

- When biotin is abundant, BirA synthesizes biotinyl-5'-AMP. This intermediate binds tightly within the BirA active site, inducing a major conformational change. In this "holo" state, the BirA dimer binds with high affinity to the bio-operator (bioO) DNA sequence, physically blocking RNA polymerase and shutting down transcription of the bio operon.
- When biotin is scarce, no biotinyl-5'-AMP is formed. BirA remains in its "apo" conformation, which has a very low affinity for the bioO sequence. The operator site remains unoccupied, allowing for the transcription of the bio-operon and the synthesis of more biotin.

== Structure and Mechanism ==
The E. coli BirA protein is a homodimer, with each monomer having a molecular weight of approximately 35.4 kDa. Each monomer is composed of three distinct domains:

1. N-terminal Domain: Contains a classic helix-turn-helix (HTH) DNA-binding motif. In the apo-enzyme, this domain is highly flexible and disordered.
2. Central Catalytic Domain: The largest domain, which forms the active site. It contains the binding pockets for ATP and biotin and is responsible for both steps of the ligase reaction.
3. C-terminal Domain: Contributes to the dimerization interface.

The transition from the ligase-competent to the repressor-competent state is driven by the binding of biotinyl-5'-AMP, which orders a flexible loop in the central domain. This change is allosterically transmitted to the N-terminal domain, causing it to lock into a fixed orientation that is optimal for dimerization and high-affinity DNA binding. The biotinylation reaction occurs in two discrete steps within the same active site:

BirA uses ATP to activate the carboxyl group of biotin, forming a high-energy mixed anhydride intermediate, biotinyl-5'-adenylate (biotinyl-5'-AMP), and releasing pyrophosphate (PP_{i}).

Biotin + ATP ⇌ Biotinyl-5'-AMP + PP_{i}

The activated biotinyl group is transferred from AMP to the ε-amino group of the specific target lysine residue on the acceptor protein (e.g., BCCP). This forms a stable amide bond.

Biotinyl-5'-AMP + Apo-protein → Biotinylated-protein + AMP

== Applications in Biotechnology ==
=== Site-Specific Biotinylation (AviTag) ===
The natural recognition sequence for BirA on BCCP has been minimized to a 15-amino-acid peptide, commonly known as the AviTag (sequence: GLNDIFEAQKIEWHE). By genetically fusing the AviTag to a protein of interest (POI), researchers can use BirA to specifically biotinylate that protein at a single, known site.

== See also ==
- Biotin
- Biotinylation
- Streptavidin
- Acetyl-CoA carboxylase
- Proximity labeling
