= Pantoate—beta-alanine ligase =

Class of enzymes

Pantoate—β-alanine ligase

Identifiers
- EC no.: 6.3.2.1
- CAS no.: 9023-49-8

Databases
- IntEnz: IntEnz view
- BRENDA: BRENDA entry
- ExPASy: NiceZyme view
- KEGG: KEGG entry
- MetaCyc: metabolic pathway
- PRIAM: profile
- PDB structures: RCSB PDB PDBe PDBsum
- Gene Ontology: AmiGO / QuickGO
Search
- PMC: articles
- PubMed: articles
- NCBI: proteins

In enzymology, a pantoate—β-alanine ligase (EC 6.3.2.1) is an enzyme that catalyzes the chemical reaction

ATP + (R)-pantoate + β-alanine $\rightleftharpoons$ AMP + diphosphate + (R)-pantothenate

The 3 substrates of this enzyme are ATP, (R)-pantoate, and beta-alanine, whereas its 3 products are AMP, diphosphate, and (R)-pantothenate.

This enzyme belongs to the family of ligases, specifically those forming carbon-nitrogen bonds as acid-D-amino-acid ligases (peptide synthases). The systematic name of this enzyme class is (R)-pantoate:beta-alanine ligase (AMP-forming). Other names in common use include pantothenate synthetase, pantoate activating enzyme, pantoic-activating enzyme, and D-pantoate:beta-alanine ligase (AMP-forming). This enzyme participates in beta-alanine metabolism and pantothenate and CoA biosynthesis.

== Structural studies ==
As of late 2007, 15 structures have been solved for this class of enzymes, with PDB accession codes 1IHO, 1MOP, 1N2B, 1N2E, 1N2G, 1N2H, 1N2I, 1N2J, 1N2O, 1UFV, 1V8F, 2A7X, 2A84, 2A86, and 2A88.
