= Formate—dihydrofolate ligase =

Identifiers
- EC no.: 6.3.4.17
- CAS no.: 123303-25-3

Databases
- IntEnz: IntEnz view
- BRENDA: BRENDA entry
- ExPASy: NiceZyme view
- KEGG: KEGG entry
- MetaCyc: metabolic pathway
- PRIAM: profile
- PDB structures: RCSB PDB PDBe PDBsum
- Gene Ontology: AmiGO / QuickGO
Search
- PMC: articles
- PubMed: articles
- NCBI: proteins

In enzymology, a formate—dihydrofolate ligase (EC 6.3.4.17) is an enzyme that catalyzes the chemical reaction

ATP + formate + dihydrofolate $\rightleftharpoons$ ADP + phosphate + 10-formyldihydrofolate

The 3 substrates of this enzyme are ATP, formate, and dihydrofolate, whereas its 3 products are ADP, phosphate, and 10-formyldihydrofolate.

This enzyme belongs to the family of ligases, specifically those forming generic carbon-nitrogen bonds. The systematic name of this enzyme class is formate:dihydrofolate ligase (ADP-forming).
