= 2,3-dihydroxybenzoate—serine ligase =

Class of enzymes

Enterbobactin synthase

Identifiers
- EC no.: 6.3.2.14
- CAS no.: 37318-63-1

Databases
- IntEnz: IntEnz view
- BRENDA: BRENDA entry
- ExPASy: NiceZyme view
- KEGG: KEGG entry
- MetaCyc: metabolic pathway
- PRIAM: profile
- PDB structures: RCSB PDB PDBe PDBsum
- Gene Ontology: AmiGO / QuickGO
Search
- PMC: articles
- PubMed: articles
- NCBI: proteins

In enzymology, an enterobactin synthase (2,3-dihydroxybenzoate—serine ligase, EC 6.3.2.14) is an enzyme that catalyzes the chemical reaction

ATP + 2,3-dihydroxybenzoate + L-serine $\rightleftharpoons$ products of ATP breakdown + N-(2,3-dihydroxybenzoyl)-L-serine

The 3 substrates of this enzyme are ATP, 2,3-dihydroxybenzoate, and L-serine, whereas its two products are products of ATP breakdown and N-(2,3-dihydroxybenzoyl)-L-serine.

This enzyme belongs to the family of ligases, specifically those forming carbon-nitrogen bonds as acid-D-amino-acid ligases (peptide synthases). The systematic name of this enzyme class is 2,3-dihydroxybenzoate:L-serine ligase. Other names in common use include N-(2,3-dihydroxybenzoyl)-serine synthetase, and 2,3-dihydroxybenzoylserine synthetase.
