= 4-chlorobenzoate—CoA ligase =

Class of enzymes

4-Chlorobenzoate—CoA ligase

Identifiers
- EC no.: 6.2.1.33
- CAS no.: 141583-20-2

Databases
- IntEnz: IntEnz view
- BRENDA: BRENDA entry
- ExPASy: NiceZyme view
- KEGG: KEGG entry
- MetaCyc: metabolic pathway
- PRIAM: profile
- PDB structures: RCSB PDB PDBe PDBsum
- Gene Ontology: AmiGO / QuickGO
Search
- PMC: articles
- PubMed: articles
- NCBI: proteins

In enzymology, a 4-chlorobenzoate—CoA ligase (EC 6.2.1.33) is an enzyme that catalyzes the chemical reaction

4-chlorobenzoate + CoA + ATP $\rightleftharpoons$ 4-chlorobenzoyl-CoA + AMP + diphosphate

The 3 substrates of this enzyme are 4-chlorobenzoate, CoA, and ATP, whereas its 3 products are 4-chlorobenzoyl-CoA, AMP, and diphosphate.

This enzyme belongs to the family of ligases, specifically those forming carbon-sulfur bonds as acid-thiol ligases. The systematic name of this enzyme class is 4-chlorobenzoate:CoA ligase. This enzyme participates in 2,4-dichlorobenzoate degradation. It employs one cofactor, magnesium.

== Structural studies ==
As of late 2007, two structures have been solved for this class of enzymes, with PDB accession codes 1T5D and 1T5H.
