= Asparaginyl-tRNA synthase (glutamine-hydrolysing) =

asparaginyl-tRNA synthase (glutamine-hydrolyzing)

Identifiers
- EC no.: 6.3.5.6
- CAS no.: 37211-76-0

Databases
- IntEnz: IntEnz view
- BRENDA: BRENDA entry
- ExPASy: NiceZyme view
- KEGG: KEGG entry
- MetaCyc: metabolic pathway
- PRIAM: profile
- PDB structures: RCSB PDB PDBe PDBsum
- Gene Ontology: AmiGO / QuickGO
Search
- PMC: articles
- PubMed: articles
- NCBI: proteins

In enzymology, an asparaginyl-tRNA synthase (glutamine-hydrolysing) (EC 6.3.5.6) is an enzyme that catalyzes the chemical reaction

ATP + aspartyl-tRNA^{Asn} + L-glutamine $\rightleftharpoons$ ADP + phosphate + asparaginyl-tRNA^{Asn} + L-glutamate

The 3 substrates of this enzyme are ATP, aspartyl-tRNA(Asn), and L-glutamine, whereas its 4 products are ADP, phosphate, asparaginyl-tRNA(Asn), and L-glutamate.

This enzyme belongs to the family of ligases, specifically those forming carbon-nitrogen bonds carbon-nitrogen ligases with glutamine as amido-N-donor. The systematic name of this enzyme class is aspartyl-tRNAAsn:L-glutamine amido-ligase (ADP-forming). This enzyme participates in glutamate metabolism and alanine and aspartate metabolism.
