= Aspartate—ammonia ligase (ADP-forming) =

Class of enzymes

Identifiers
- EC no.: 6.3.1.4
- CAS no.: 37318-61-9

Databases
- IntEnz: IntEnz view
- BRENDA: BRENDA entry
- ExPASy: NiceZyme view
- KEGG: KEGG entry
- MetaCyc: metabolic pathway
- PRIAM: profile
- PDB structures: RCSB PDB PDBe PDBsum
- Gene Ontology: AmiGO / QuickGO
Search
- PMC: articles
- PubMed: articles
- NCBI: proteins

In enzymology, an aspartate—ammonia ligase (ADP-forming) (EC 6.3.1.4) is an enzyme that catalyzes the chemical reaction

ATP + L-aspartate + NH_{3} $\rightleftharpoons$ ADP + phosphate + L-asparagine

The 3 substrates of this enzyme are ATP, L-aspartate, and NH_{3}, whereas its 3 products are ADP, phosphate, and L-asparagine.

This enzyme belongs to the family of ligases, specifically those forming carbon-nitrogen bonds as acid-D-ammonia (or amine) ligases (amide synthases). The systematic name of this enzyme class is L-aspartate:ammonia ligase (ADP-forming). Other names in common use include asparagine synthetase (ADP-forming), and asparagine synthetase (adenosine diphosphate-forming). This enzyme participates in nitrogen metabolism.
