= Geranoyl-CoA carboxylase =

Identifiers
- EC no.: 6.4.1.5
- CAS no.: 37324-35-9

Databases
- IntEnz: IntEnz view
- BRENDA: BRENDA entry
- ExPASy: NiceZyme view
- KEGG: KEGG entry
- MetaCyc: metabolic pathway
- PRIAM: profile
- PDB structures: RCSB PDB PDBe PDBsum
- Gene Ontology: AmiGO / QuickGO
Search
- PMC: articles
- PubMed: articles
- NCBI: proteins

In enzymology, a geranoyl-CoA carboxylase (EC 6.4.1.5) is an enzyme that catalyzes the chemical reaction

ATP + geranoyl-CoA + HCO_{3}- $\rightleftharpoons$ ADP + phosphate + 3-(4-methylpent-3-en-1-yl)pent-2-enedioyl-CoA

The 3 substrates of this enzyme are ATP, geranoyl-CoA, and HCO3-, whereas its 3 products are ADP, phosphate, and 3-(4-methylpent-3-en-1-yl)pent-2-enedioyl-CoA.

This enzyme belongs to the family of ligases, specifically those forming carbon–carbon bonds. The systematic name of this enzyme class is geranoyl-CoA:carbon-dioxide ligase (ADP-forming). Other names in common use include geranoyl coenzyme A carboxylase, and geranyl-CoA carboxylase. It employs one cofactor, biotin.
