= D-alanine—alanyl-poly(glycerolphosphate) ligase =

Class of enzymes

D-Alanine—alanyl-poly(glycerolphosphate) ligase

Identifiers
- EC no.: 6.3.2.16
- CAS no.: 9046-58-6

Databases
- IntEnz: IntEnz view
- BRENDA: BRENDA entry
- ExPASy: NiceZyme view
- KEGG: KEGG entry
- MetaCyc: metabolic pathway
- PRIAM: profile
- PDB structures: RCSB PDB PDBe PDBsum
- Gene Ontology: AmiGO / QuickGO
Search
- PMC: articles
- PubMed: articles
- NCBI: proteins

In enzymology, a D-alanine—alanyl-poly(glycerolphosphate) ligase (EC 6.3.2.16) is an enzyme that catalyzes the chemical reaction

ATP + D-alanine + alanyl-poly(glycerolphosphate) $\rightleftharpoons$ ADP + phosphate + D-alanyl-alanyl-poly(glycerolphosphate)

The 3 substrates of this enzyme are ATP, D-alanine, and alanyl-poly(glycerolphosphate), whereas its 3 products are ADP, phosphate, and D-alanyl-alanyl-poly(glycerolphosphate).

This enzyme belongs to the family of ligases, specifically those forming carbon-nitrogen bonds as acid-D-amino-acid ligases (peptide synthases). The systematic name of this enzyme class is D-alanine:alanyl-poly(glycerolphosphate) ligase (ADP-forming). Other names in common use include D-alanyl-alanyl-poly(glycerolphosphate) synthetase, D-alanine:membrane-acceptor ligase, D-alanylalanylpoly(phosphoglycerol) synthetase, D-alanyl-poly(phosphoglycerol) synthetase, and D-alanine-membrane acceptor-ligase. This enzyme participates in d-alanine metabolism.
