= Glutamate—tRNA(Gln) ligase =

Glutamate—tRNA^{Gln} ligase

Identifiers
- EC no.: 6.1.1.24
- CAS no.: 9068-76-2

Databases
- BRENDA: enzyme data
- ExPASy: NiceZyme view
- KEGG: enzyme entry
- MetaCyc: metabolic pathway
- Rhea: reactions
- PDB structures: RCSB PDB PDBe PDBsum
- Gene Ontology: AmiGO / QuickGO
Search
- PMC: articles
- PubMed: articles
- NCBI: proteins

In enzymology, a glutamate—tRNA^{Gln} ligase (EC 6.1.1.24) is an enzyme that catalyzes the chemical reaction

ATP + L-glutamate + tRNAGlx $\rightleftharpoons$ AMP + diphosphate + glutamyl-tRNAGlx

The 3 substrates of this enzyme are ATP, L-glutamate, and tRNAGlx, whereas its 3 products are AMP, diphosphate, and glutamyl-tRNAGlx.

This enzyme belongs to the family of ligases, to be specific those forming carbon-oxygen bonds in aminoacyl-tRNA and related compounds. The systematic name of this enzyme class is L-glutamate:tRNAGlx ligase (AMP-forming). This enzyme is also called glutamyl-tRNA synthetase. This enzyme participates in glutamate metabolism.
