= Long-chain-fatty-acid—luciferin-component ligase =

Identifiers
- EC no.: 6.2.1.19
- CAS no.: 82657-98-5

Databases
- IntEnz: IntEnz view
- BRENDA: BRENDA entry
- ExPASy: NiceZyme view
- KEGG: KEGG entry
- MetaCyc: metabolic pathway
- PRIAM: profile
- PDB structures: RCSB PDB PDBe PDBsum
- Gene Ontology: AmiGO / QuickGO
Search
- PMC: articles
- PubMed: articles
- NCBI: proteins

In enzymology, a long-chain-fatty-acid—luciferin-component ligase (EC 6.2.1.19) is an enzyme that catalyzes the chemical reaction

ATP + an acid + protein $\rightleftharpoons$ AMP + diphosphate + an acyl-protein thioester

The 3 substrates of this enzyme are ATP, acid, and protein, whereas its 3 products are AMP, diphosphate, and acyl-protein thioester.

This enzyme belongs to the family of ligases, specifically those forming carbon-sulfur bonds as acid-thiol ligases. The systematic name of this enzyme class is long-chain-fatty-acid:protein ligase (AMP-forming). This enzyme is also called acyl-protein synthetase.
