= Acetone carboxylase =

Class of enzymes

Identifiers
- EC no.: 6.4.1.6

Databases
- IntEnz: IntEnz view
- BRENDA: BRENDA entry
- ExPASy: NiceZyme view
- KEGG: KEGG entry
- MetaCyc: metabolic pathway
- PRIAM: profile
- PDB structures: RCSB PDB PDBe PDBsum
- Gene Ontology: AmiGO / QuickGO
Search
- PMC: articles
- PubMed: articles
- NCBI: proteins

In enzymology, an acetone carboxylase (EC 6.4.1.6) is an enzyme that catalyzes the chemical reaction

acetone + CO_{2} + ATP + 2 H_{2}O $\rightleftharpoons$ acetoacetate + AMP + 2 phosphate

The 4 substrates of this enzyme are acetone, CO_{2}, ATP, and H_{2}O, whereas its 3 products are acetoacetate, AMP, and phosphate.

This enzyme belongs to the family of ligases, specifically those forming carbon-carbon bonds. The systematic name of this enzyme class is acetone:carbon-dioxide ligase (AMP-forming).
