= Anthranilate—CoA ligase =

Identifiers
- EC no.: 6.2.1.32
- CAS no.: 112692-58-7

Databases
- IntEnz: IntEnz view
- BRENDA: BRENDA entry
- ExPASy: NiceZyme view
- KEGG: KEGG entry
- MetaCyc: metabolic pathway
- PRIAM: profile
- PDB structures: RCSB PDB PDBe PDBsum
- Gene Ontology: AmiGO / QuickGO
Search
- PMC: articles
- PubMed: articles
- NCBI: proteins

In enzymology, an anthranilate—CoA ligase (EC 6.2.1.32) is an enzyme that catalyzes the chemical reaction

ATP + anthranilate + CoA $\rightleftharpoons$ AMP + diphosphate + anthranilyl-CoA

The 3 substrates of this enzyme are ATP, anthranilate, and CoA, whereas its 3 products are AMP, diphosphate, and anthranilyl-CoA.

This enzyme belongs to the family of ligases, specifically those forming carbon-sulfur bonds as acid-thiol ligases. The systematic name of this enzyme class is anthranilate:CoA ligase (AMP-forming). Other names in common use include anthraniloyl coenzyme A synthetase, 2-aminobenzoate-CoA ligase, 2-aminobenzoate-coenzyme A ligase, and 2-aminobenzoate coenzyme A ligase. This enzyme participates in 3 metabolic pathways: carbazole degradation, benzoate degradation via coa ligation, and acridone alkaloid biosynthesis.
