= D-alanine–poly(phosphoribitol) ligase =

Class of enzymes

D-Alanine—poly(phosphoribitol) ligase

Identifiers
- EC no.: 6.1.1.13
- CAS no.: 9023-65-8

Databases
- IntEnz: IntEnz view
- BRENDA: BRENDA entry
- ExPASy: NiceZyme view
- KEGG: KEGG entry
- MetaCyc: metabolic pathway
- PRIAM: profile
- PDB structures: RCSB PDB PDBe PDBsum
- Gene Ontology: AmiGO / QuickGO
Search
- PMC: articles
- PubMed: articles
- NCBI: proteins

In enzymology, a D-alanine–poly(phosphoribitol) ligase (EC 6.1.1.13) is an enzyme that catalyzes the chemical reaction

ATP + D-alanine + poly(ribitol phosphate) $\rightleftharpoons$ AMP + diphosphate + o-D-alanyl-poly(ribitol phosphate)

The 3 substrates of this enzyme are ATP, D-alanine, and poly(ribitol phosphate), whereas its 3 products are AMP, diphosphate, and o-D-alanyl-poly(ribitol phosphate).

This enzyme belongs to the family of ligases, to be specific those forming carbon–oxygen bonds in aminoacyl-tRNA and related compounds. The systematic name of this enzyme class is D-alanine:poly(phosphoribitol) ligase (AMP-forming). Other names in common use include D-alanyl-poly(phosphoribitol) synthetase, D-alanine: membrane acceptor ligase, D-alanine-D-alanyl carrier protein ligase, D-alanine-membrane acceptor ligase, and D-alanine-activating enzyme. This enzyme participates in D-alanine metabolism.
