= 4-methyleneglutamate—ammonia ligase =

Class of enzymes

4-Methyleneglutamate—ammonia ligase

Identifiers
- EC no.: 6.3.1.7
- CAS no.: 85537-85-5

Databases
- IntEnz: IntEnz view
- BRENDA: BRENDA entry
- ExPASy: NiceZyme view
- KEGG: KEGG entry
- MetaCyc: metabolic pathway
- PRIAM: profile
- PDB structures: RCSB PDB PDBe PDBsum
- Gene Ontology: AmiGO / QuickGO
Search
- PMC: articles
- PubMed: articles
- NCBI: proteins

In enzymology, a 4-methyleneglutamate—ammonia ligase (EC 6.3.1.7) is an enzyme that catalyzes the chemical reaction

ATP + 4-methylene-L-glutamate + NH_{3} $\rightleftharpoons$ AMP + diphosphate + 4-methylene-L-glutamine

The 3 substrates of this enzyme are ATP, 4-methylene-L-glutamate, and NH_{3}, whereas its 3 products are AMP, diphosphate, and 4-methylene-L-glutamine.

This enzyme belongs to the family of ligases, specifically those forming carbon-nitrogen bonds as acid-D-ammonia (or amine) ligases (amide synthases). The systematic name of this enzyme class is 4-methylene-L-glutamate:ammonia ligase (AMP-forming). This enzyme is also called 4-methyleneglutamine synthetase. This enzyme participates in c5-branched dibasic acid metabolism.
