= Asparagine–tRNA ligase =

Class of enzymes

Identifiers
- EC no.: 6.1.1.22
- CAS no.: 37211-76-0

Databases
- BRENDA: enzyme data
- ExPASy: NiceZyme view
- KEGG: enzyme entry
- MetaCyc: metabolic pathway
- Rhea: reactions
- PDB structures: RCSB PDB PDBe PDBsum
- Gene Ontology: AmiGO / QuickGO
Search
- PMC: articles
- PubMed: articles
- NCBI: proteins

In enzymology, an asparagine–tRNA ligase (EC 6.1.1.22) is an enzyme that catalyzes the chemical reaction

ATP + L-asparagine + tRNA^{Asn} $\rightleftharpoons$ AMP + diphosphate + L-asparaginyl-tRNA^{Asn}

The 3 substrates of this enzyme are ATP, L-asparagine, and tRNA^{Asn}, whereas its 3 products are AMP, diphosphate, and L-asparaginyl-tRNA^{Asn}.

This enzyme belongs to the family of ligases, to be specific those forming carbon–oxygen bonds in aminoacyl-tRNA and related compounds. The systematic name of this enzyme class is L-asparagine:tRNA^{Asn} ligase (AMP-forming). Other names in common use include asparaginyl-tRNA synthetase, asparaginyl-transfer ribonucleate synthetase, asparaginyl transfer RNA synthetase, asparaginyl transfer ribonucleic acid synthetase, asparagyl-transfer RNA synthetase, and asparagine translase. This enzyme participates in alanine and aspartate metabolism and aminoacyl-tRNA biosynthesis.

== In humans ==
There are two isozymes of this enzyme found in humans, one in the cytoplasm, and one in the mitochondria.

=== Cytoplasmic ===
Asparagine–tRNA ligase, cytoplasmic, also called asparaginyl-tRNA synthetase 1, is an enzyme that in humans is encoded by the NARS1 gene. The N-terminal domain represents the signature sequence for the eukaryotic asparaginyl-tRNA synthetases.

=== Mitochondrial ===
Asparagine–tRNA ligase, mitochondrial, also called asparaginyl-tRNA synthetase 2, is an enzyme that in humans is encoded by the NARS2 gene. Pathogenic mutations have been associated with a mitochondrial disease called combined oxidative phosphorylation deficiency-24 (COXPD24).

== In plants ==
In plants like mouse-ear cress, there is predicted to be 3 different cytoplasmic varieties, encoded by the plant genes SYNC1, SYNC2, and SYNC3. They have an additional variety, encoded by the gene SYNO, which localizes to both the mitochondria and the chloroplasts, apparently via protein dual-targeting.

== Structural studies ==
As of late 2007, 3 structures have been solved for this class of enzymes, with PDB accession codes PDB: 1X54, PDB: 1X55, and PDB: 1X56.
