= Diphthine—ammonia ligase =

Class of enzymes

Identifiers
- EC no.: 6.3.1.14
- CAS no.: 114514-33-9

Databases
- IntEnz: IntEnz view
- BRENDA: BRENDA entry
- ExPASy: NiceZyme view
- KEGG: KEGG entry
- MetaCyc: metabolic pathway
- PRIAM: profile
- PDB structures: RCSB PDB PDBe PDBsum
- Gene Ontology: AmiGO / QuickGO
Search
- PMC: articles
- PubMed: articles
- NCBI: proteins

In enzymology, a diphthine—ammonia ligase (EC 6.3.1.14, diphthamide synthase, diphthamide synthetase) is an enzyme that catalyzes the chemical reaction

ATP + diphthine + NH_{3} $\rightleftharpoons$ ADP + phosphate + diphthamide

The 3 substrates of this enzyme are ATP, diphthine, and NH_{3}, whereas its 3 products are ADP, phosphate, and diphthamide.

This enzyme belongs to the family of ligases, specifically those forming carbon-nitrogen bonds as acid-D-amino-acid ligases (peptide synthases). The systematic name of this enzyme class is diphthine:ammonia ligase (ADP-forming). Other names in common use include diphthamide synthase, and diphthamide synthetase.
