= D-aspartate ligase =

Class of enzymes

D-Aspartate ligase

Identifiers
- EC no.: 6.3.1.12

Databases
- IntEnz: IntEnz view
- BRENDA: BRENDA entry
- ExPASy: NiceZyme view
- KEGG: KEGG entry
- MetaCyc: metabolic pathway
- PRIAM: profile
- PDB structures: RCSB PDB PDBe PDBsum
Search
- PMC: articles
- PubMed: articles
- NCBI: proteins

In enzymology, a D-aspartate ligase (EC 6.3.1.12) is an enzyme that catalyzes the chemical reaction

ATP + D-aspartate + [beta-GlcNAc-(1->4)-Mur_{2}Ac(oyl-L-Ala-gamma-D-Glu-L-Lys-D-Ala-D- Ala)]n $\rightleftharpoons$ [beta-GlcNAc-(1->4)-Mur_{2}Ac(oyl-L-Ala-gamma-D-Glu-6-N-(beta-D-Asp)-L- Lys-D-Ala-D-Ala)]n + ADP + phosphate

The 4 substrates of this enzyme are ATP, D-aspartate, [[beta-GlcNAc-(1->4)-Mur2Ac(oyl-L-Ala-gamma-D-Glu-L-Lys-D-Ala-D-]], and [[Ala)]n]], whereas its 4 products are [[beta-GlcNAc-(1->4)-Mur2Ac(oyl-L-Ala-gamma-D-Glu-6-N-(beta-D-Asp)-L-]], [[Lys-D-Ala-D-Ala)]n]], ADP, and phosphate.

This enzyme belongs to the family of ligases, specifically those forming carbon-nitrogen bonds as acid-D-ammonia (or amine) ligases (amide synthases). The systematic name of this enzyme class is D-aspartate:[beta-GlcNAc-(1->4)-Mur2Ac(oyl-L-Ala-gamma-D-Glu-L-Lys-D -Ala-D-Ala)]n ligase (ADP-forming). Other names in common use include Aslfm, UDP-MurNAc-pentapeptide:D-aspartate ligase, and D-aspartic acid-activating enzyme.
