= Acid—CoA ligase (GDP-forming) =

Class of enzymes

Identifiers
- EC no.: 6.2.1.10
- CAS no.: 37318-59-5

Databases
- IntEnz: IntEnz view
- BRENDA: BRENDA entry
- ExPASy: NiceZyme view
- KEGG: KEGG entry
- MetaCyc: metabolic pathway
- PRIAM: profile
- PDB structures: RCSB PDB PDBe PDBsum
- Gene Ontology: AmiGO / QuickGO
Search
- PMC: articles
- PubMed: articles
- NCBI: proteins

In enzymology, an acid—CoA ligase (GDP-forming) (EC 6.2.1.10) is an enzyme that catalyzes the chemical reaction

GTP + an acid + CoA $\rightleftharpoons$ GDP + phosphate + acyl-CoA

The 3 substrates of this enzyme are GTP, acid, and CoA, whereas its 3 products are GDP, phosphate, and acyl-CoA.

This enzyme belongs to the family of ligases, specifically those forming carbon-sulfur bonds as acid-thiol ligases. The systematic name of this enzyme class is acid:CoA ligase (GDP-forming). Other names in common use include acyl-CoA synthetase (GDP-forming), and acyl coenzyme A synthetase (guanosine diphosphate forming).
