= Glutamate—putrescine ligase =

Class of enzymes

Glutamate-putrescine ligase

Identifiers
- EC no.: 6.3.1.11
- CAS no.: 914090-78-1

Databases
- IntEnz: IntEnz view
- BRENDA: BRENDA entry
- ExPASy: NiceZyme view
- KEGG: KEGG entry
- MetaCyc: metabolic pathway
- PRIAM: profile
- PDB structures: RCSB PDB PDBe PDBsum
Search
- PMC: articles
- PubMed: articles
- NCBI: proteins

In enzymology, a glutamate-putrescine ligase (EC 6.3.1.11) is an enzyme that catalyzes the chemical reaction

ATP + L-glutamate + putrescine $\rightleftharpoons$ ADP + phosphate + gamma-L-glutamylputrescine

The 3 substrates of this enzyme are ATP, L-glutamate, and putrescine, whereas its 3 products are ADP, phosphate, and gamma-L-glutamylputrescine.

This enzyme belongs to the family of ligases, specifically those forming carbon-nitrogen bonds as acid-D-ammonia (or amine) ligases (amide synthases). The systematic name of this enzyme class is L-glutamate:putrescine ligase (ADP-forming). Other names in common use include gamma-glutamylputrescine synthetase, and YcjK. This enzyme participates in urea cycle and metabolism of amino groups.
