= Glutamate—ethylamine ligase =

Class of enzymes

Identifiers
- EC no.: 6.3.1.6
- CAS no.: 62213-31-4

Databases
- IntEnz: IntEnz view
- BRENDA: BRENDA entry
- ExPASy: NiceZyme view
- KEGG: KEGG entry
- MetaCyc: metabolic pathway
- PRIAM: profile
- PDB structures: RCSB PDB PDBe PDBsum
- Gene Ontology: AmiGO / QuickGO
Search
- PMC: articles
- PubMed: articles
- NCBI: proteins

In enzymology, a glutamate—ethylamine ligase (EC 6.3.1.6) is an enzyme that catalyzes the chemical reaction

ATP + L-glutamate + ethylamine $\rightleftharpoons$ ADP + phosphate + N_{5}-ethyl-L-glutamine

The 3 substrates of this enzyme are ATP, L-glutamate, and ethylamine, whereas its 3 products are ADP, phosphate, and N5-ethyl-L-glutamine.

This enzyme belongs to the family of ligases, specifically those forming carbon-nitrogen bonds as acid-D-ammonia (or amine) ligases (amide synthases). The systematic name of this enzyme class is L-glutamate:ethylamine ligase (ADP-forming). Other names in common use include N5-ethyl-L-glutamine synthetase, theanine synthetase, and N5-ethylglutamine synthetase.
