= Ribose-5-phosphate—ammonia ligase =

Identifiers
- EC no.: 6.3.4.7
- CAS no.: 9082-52-4

Databases
- IntEnz: IntEnz view
- BRENDA: BRENDA entry
- ExPASy: NiceZyme view
- KEGG: KEGG entry
- MetaCyc: metabolic pathway
- PRIAM: profile
- PDB structures: RCSB PDB PDBe PDBsum
- Gene Ontology: AmiGO / QuickGO
Search
- PMC: articles
- PubMed: articles
- NCBI: proteins

In enzymology, a ribose-5-phosphate—ammonia ligase (EC 6.3.4.7) is an enzyme that catalyzes the chemical reaction

ATP + ribose 5-phosphate + NH_{3} $\rightleftharpoons$ ADP + phosphate + 5-phosphoribosylamine

The 3 substrates of this enzyme are ATP, ribose 5-phosphate, and NH_{3}, whereas its 3 products are ADP, phosphate, and 5-phosphoribosylamine.

This enzyme belongs to the family of ligases, specifically those forming generic carbon-nitrogen bonds. The systematic name of this enzyme class is ribose-5-phosphate:ammonia ligase (ADP-forming). This enzyme participates in purine metabolism.
