= RNA-3'-phosphate cyclase =

RNA-3′-phosphate cyclase

Identifiers
- EC no.: 6.5.1.4
- CAS no.: 85638-41-1

Databases
- IntEnz: IntEnz view
- BRENDA: BRENDA entry
- ExPASy: NiceZyme view
- KEGG: KEGG entry
- MetaCyc: metabolic pathway
- PRIAM: profile
- PDB structures: RCSB PDB PDBe PDBsum
- Gene Ontology: AmiGO / QuickGO
Search
- PMC: articles
- PubMed: articles
- NCBI: proteins

In enzymology, a RNA-3′-phosphate cyclase (EC 6.5.1.4) is an enzyme that catalyzes the chemical reaction

ATP + RNA 3'-terminal-phosphate $\rightleftharpoons$ AMP + diphosphate + RNA terminal-2',3'-cyclic-phosphate

Thus, the two substrates of this enzyme are ATP and RNA 3'-terminal-phosphate, whereas its 3 products are AMP, diphosphate, and RNA terminal-2',3'-cyclic-phosphate.

This enzyme belongs to the family of ligases, specifically those forming phosphoric-ester bonds. The systematic name of this enzyme class is RNA-3'-phosphate:RNA ligase (cyclizing, AMP-forming). This enzyme is also called RNA cyclase.

== Structural studies ==
As of 2010, three structures have been solved for this class of enzymes, with PDB accession codes 1QMH and 1QMI, (un-adenylated) and 3KGD (adenylated).
