= Oxalate—CoA ligase =

Identifiers
- EC no.: 6.2.1.8
- CAS no.: 37318-57-3

Databases
- IntEnz: IntEnz view
- BRENDA: BRENDA entry
- ExPASy: NiceZyme view
- KEGG: KEGG entry
- MetaCyc: metabolic pathway
- PRIAM: profile
- PDB structures: RCSB PDB PDBe PDBsum
- Gene Ontology: AmiGO / QuickGO
Search
- PMC: articles
- PubMed: articles
- NCBI: proteins

In enzymology, an oxalate—CoA ligase (EC 6.2.1.8) is an enzyme that catalyzes the chemical reaction

ATP + oxalate + CoA $\rightleftharpoons$ AMP + diphosphate + oxalyl-CoA

The 3 substrates of this enzyme are ATP, oxalate, and coenzyme A (CoA), whereas its 3 products are AMP, diphosphate, and oxalyl-CoA.

This enzyme belongs to the family of ligases, specifically those forming carbon-sulfur bonds as acid-thiol ligases. The systematic name of this enzyme class is oxalate:CoA ligase (AMP-forming). Other names in common use include oxalyl-CoA synthetase, and oxalyl coenzyme A synthetase. This enzyme participates in glyoxylate and dicarboxylate metabolism.

Organisms with Oxalate-CoA Ligases include:
Arabidopsis thaliana
Saccharomyces cerevisiae
