= UDP-N-acetylmuramoyl-L-alanyl-D-glutamate—D-lysine ligase =

Class of enzymes

Identifiers
- EC no.: 6.3.2.37

Databases
- IntEnz: IntEnz view
- BRENDA: BRENDA entry
- ExPASy: NiceZyme view
- KEGG: KEGG entry
- MetaCyc: metabolic pathway
- PRIAM: profile
- PDB structures: RCSB PDB PDBe PDBsum
Search
- PMC: articles
- PubMed: articles
- NCBI: proteins

UDP-N-acetylmuramoyl-L-alanyl-D-glutamate—D-lysine ligase (EC 6.3.2.37, UDP-MurNAc-L-Ala-D-Glu:D-Lys ligase, D-lysine-adding enzyme) is an enzyme with systematic name UDP-N-acetylmuramoyl-L-alanyl-D-glutamate:D-lysine alpha-ligase (ADP-forming). This enzyme catalyses the following chemical reaction

ATP + UDP-N-acetylmuramoyl-L-alanyl-D-glutamate + D-lysine $\rightleftharpoons$ ADP + phosphate + UDP-N-acetylmuramoyl-L-alanyl-D-glutamyl-D-lysine

The enzyme from Thermotoga maritima also performs the reaction of EC 6.3.2.7.
