= (carboxyethyl)arginine beta-lactam-synthase =

Class of enzymes

(Carboxyethyl)arginine β-lactam-synthase
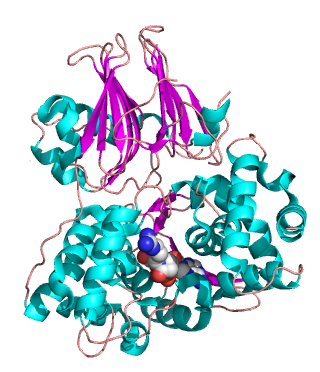
- beta-lactam synthetase. PDB 1mc1

Identifiers
- EC no.: 6.3.3.4
- CAS no.: 68247-54-1

Databases
- IntEnz: IntEnz view
- BRENDA: BRENDA entry
- ExPASy: NiceZyme view
- KEGG: KEGG entry
- MetaCyc: metabolic pathway
- PRIAM: profile
- PDB structures: RCSB PDB PDBe PDBsum
- Gene Ontology: AmiGO / QuickGO
Search
- PMC: articles
- PubMed: articles
- NCBI: proteins

In enzymology, a (carboxyethyl)arginine β-lactam-synthase (EC 6.3.3.4) is an enzyme that catalyzes the chemical reaction

ATP + L-N_{2}-(2-carboxyethyl)arginine $\rightleftharpoons$ AMP + diphosphate + deoxyamidinoproclavaminate

Thus, the two substrates of this enzyme are ATP and L-N2-(2-carboxyethyl)arginine, whereas its 3 products are AMP, diphosphate, and deoxyamidinoproclavaminate.

This enzyme belongs to the family of ligases, specifically the cyclo-ligases, which form carbon-nitrogen bonds. The systematic name of this enzyme class is L-N2-(2-carboxyethyl)arginine cyclo-ligase (AMP-forming). This enzyme is also called L-2-N-(2-carboxyethyl)arginine cyclo-ligase (AMP-forming). This enzyme participates in clavulanic acid biosynthesis.
