= Glutarate—CoA ligase =

Identifiers
- EC no.: 6.2.1.6
- CAS no.: 9023-68-1

Databases
- IntEnz: IntEnz view
- BRENDA: BRENDA entry
- ExPASy: NiceZyme view
- KEGG: KEGG entry
- MetaCyc: metabolic pathway
- PRIAM: profile
- PDB structures: RCSB PDB PDBe PDBsum
- Gene Ontology: AmiGO / QuickGO
Search
- PMC: articles
- PubMed: articles
- NCBI: proteins

In enzymology, a glutarate—CoA ligase (EC 6.2.1.6) is an enzyme that catalyzes the chemical reaction

ATP + glutarate + CoA $\rightleftharpoons$ ADP + phosphate + glutaryl-CoA

The 3 substrates of this enzyme are ATP, glutarate, and CoA, whereas its 3 products are ADP, phosphate, and glutaryl-CoA.

This enzyme belongs to the family of ligases, specifically those forming carbon-sulfur bonds as acid-thiol ligases. The systematic name of this enzyme class is glutarate:CoA ligase (ADP-forming). Other names in common use include glutaryl-CoA synthetase, and glutaryl coenzyme A synthetase. This enzyme participates in fatty acid metabolism and lysine degradation.
