= Proline–tRNA ligase =

Class of enzymes

Identifiers
- EC no.: 6.1.1.15
- CAS no.: 9055-68-9

Databases
- BRENDA: enzyme data
- ExPASy: NiceZyme view
- KEGG: enzyme entry
- MetaCyc: metabolic pathway
- Rhea: reactions
- PDB structures: RCSB PDB PDBe PDBsum
- Gene Ontology: AmiGO / QuickGO
Search
- PMC: articles
- PubMed: articles
- NCBI: proteins

In enzymology, a proline–tRNA ligase or proline—tRNA ligase (accepted enzyme name) is an enzyme that catalyzes the chemical reaction

ATP + L-proline + tRNA^{Pro} $\rightleftharpoons$ AMP + diphosphate + L-prolyl-tRNA^{Pro}

The 3 substrates of this enzyme are ATP, L-proline, and tRNA^{Pro}, whereas its 3 products are AMP, diphosphate, and L-prolyl-tRNA^{Pro}.

This enzyme participates in arginine and proline metabolism and aminoacyl-tRNA biosynthesis.

== Nomenclature ==
This enzyme belongs to the family of ligases, to be specific those forming carbon-oxygen bonds in aminoacyl-tRNA and related compounds. The systematic name of this enzyme class is L-proline:tRNA^{Pro} ligase (AMP-forming). Other names in common use include prolyl-tRNA synthetase, prolyl-transferRNA synthetase, prolyl-transfer ribonucleate synthetase, proline translase, prolyl-transfer ribonucleic acid synthetase, prolyl-s-RNA synthetase, and prolinyl-tRNA ligase.
