= Imidazoleacetate—phosphoribosyldiphosphate ligase =

Identifiers
- EC no.: 6.3.4.8
- CAS no.: 37318-65-3

Databases
- IntEnz: IntEnz view
- BRENDA: BRENDA entry
- ExPASy: NiceZyme view
- KEGG: KEGG entry
- MetaCyc: metabolic pathway
- PRIAM: profile
- PDB structures: RCSB PDB PDBe PDBsum
- Gene Ontology: AmiGO / QuickGO
Search
- PMC: articles
- PubMed: articles
- NCBI: proteins

In enzymology, an imidazoleacetate—phosphoribosyldiphosphate ligase (EC 6.3.4.8) is an enzyme that catalyzes a chemical reaction

ATP + imidazole-4-acetate + 5-phosphoribosyl diphosphate $\rightleftharpoons$ ADP + phosphate + 1-(5-phosphoribosyl)imidazole-4-acetate + diphosphate

The 3 substrates of this enzyme are ATP, imidazole-4-acetate, and 5-phosphoribosyl diphosphate, whereas its 4 products are ADP, phosphate, 1-(5-phosphoribosyl)imidazole-4-acetate, and diphosphate.

This enzyme belongs to the family of ligases, specifically those forming generic carbon-nitrogen bonds. The systematic name of this enzyme class is imidazoleacetate:5-phosphoribosyl-diphosphate ligase (ADP- and diphosphate-forming). This enzyme is also called 5-phosphoribosylimidazoleacetate synthetase. This enzyme participates in histidine metabolism.
