= Homoglutathione synthase =

Class of enzymes

Identifiers
- EC no.: 6.3.2.23
- CAS no.: 113875-72-2

Databases
- IntEnz: IntEnz view
- BRENDA: BRENDA entry
- ExPASy: NiceZyme view
- KEGG: KEGG entry
- MetaCyc: metabolic pathway
- PRIAM: profile
- PDB structures: RCSB PDB PDBe PDBsum
- Gene Ontology: AmiGO / QuickGO
Search
- PMC: articles
- PubMed: articles
- NCBI: proteins

In enzymology, a homoglutathione synthase (EC 6.3.2.23) is an enzyme that catalyzes the chemical reaction

ATP + γ-L-glutamyl-L-cysteine + β-alanine $\rightleftharpoons$ ADP + phosphate + γ-Lglutamyl-L-cysteinyl-β-alanine

The 3 substrates of this enzyme are ATP, gamma-L-glutamyl-L-cysteine, and beta-alanine, whereas its 3 products are ADP, phosphate, and gamma-L-glutamyl-L-cysteinyl-beta-alanine.

This enzyme belongs to the family of ligases, specifically those forming carbon-nitrogen bonds as acid-D-amino-acid ligases (peptide synthases). The systematic name of this enzyme class is gamma-L-glutamyl-L-cysteine:beta-alanine ligase (ADP-forming). Other names in common use include homoglutathione synthetase, and beta-alanine specific hGSH synthetase.
