= Aspartate—ammonia ligase =

Enzyme

Identifiers
- EC no.: 6.3.1.1
- CAS no.: 9023-69-2

Databases
- IntEnz: IntEnz view
- BRENDA: BRENDA entry
- ExPASy: NiceZyme view
- KEGG: KEGG entry
- MetaCyc: metabolic pathway
- PRIAM: profile
- PDB structures: RCSB PDB PDBe PDBsum
- Gene Ontology: AmiGO / QuickGO
Search
- PMC: articles
- PubMed: articles
- NCBI: proteins

In enzymology, an aspartate—ammonia ligase (EC 6.3.1.1) is an enzyme that catalyzes the chemical reaction

ATP + L-aspartate + NH_{3} $\rightleftharpoons$ AMP + diphosphate + L-asparagine

The 3 substrates of this enzyme are ATP, L-aspartate, and NH_{3}, whereas its 3 products are AMP, diphosphate, and L-asparagine.

This enzyme belongs to the family of ligases, specifically those forming carbon-nitrogen bonds as acid-D-ammonia (or amine) ligases (amide synthases). The systematic name of this enzyme class is L-aspartate:ammonia ligase (AMP-forming). Other names in common use include asparagine synthetase, and L-asparagine synthetase. This enzyme participates in 3 metabolic pathways: alanine and aspartate metabolism, cyanoamino acid metabolism, and nitrogen metabolism.

== Structural studies ==
As of late 2007, two structures have been solved for this class of enzymes, with PDB accession codes 11AS and 12AS.
