= Aspartate—tRNA(Asn) ligase =

Aspartate—tRNA^{Asn} ligase

Identifiers
- EC no.: 6.1.1.23
- CAS no.: 9027-32-1

Databases
- IntEnz: IntEnz view
- BRENDA: BRENDA entry
- ExPASy: NiceZyme view
- KEGG: KEGG entry
- MetaCyc: metabolic pathway
- PRIAM: profile
- PDB structures: RCSB PDB PDBe PDBsum
Search
- PMC: articles
- PubMed: articles
- NCBI: proteins

Aspartate—tRNA^{Asn} ligase (EC 6.1.1.23, nondiscriminating aspartyl-tRNA synthetase) is an enzyme with systematic name L-aspartate:tRNAAsx ligase (AMP-forming). This enzyme catalyses the following chemical reaction

ATP + L-aspartate + tRNAAsx $\rightleftharpoons$ AMP + diphosphate + aspartyl-tRNAAsx

The 3 substrates of this enzyme are ATP, L-asparagine, and tRNAAsx, whereas its 3 products are AMP, diphosphate, and asparaginyl-tRNAAsx.

When this enzyme acts on tRNAAsp, it catalyses the same reaction as EC 6.1.1.12, aspartate---tRNA ligase. It has, however, diminished discrimination, so that it can also form aspartyl-tRNAAsn. This relaxation of specificity has been found to result from the absence of a loop in the tRNA that specifically recognizes the third position of the anticodon [1]. This accounts for the ability of this enzyme in, for example, Thermus thermophilus, to recognize both tRNAAsp (GUC anticodon) and tRNAAsn (GUU anticodon). The aspartyl-tRNAAsn is not used in protein synthesis until it is converted by EC 6.3.5.6, asparaginyl-tRNA synthase (glutamine-hydrolysing), into asparaginyl-tRNAAsn.

This enzyme belongs to the family of ligases, to be specific those forming carbon-oxygen bonds in aminoacyl-tRNA and related compounds. The systematic name of this enzyme class is L-asparaginyl:tRNAAsx ligase (AMP-forming). This enzyme is also called nondiscriminating asparaginyl-tRNA synthetase. This enzyme participates in alanine and asparagine metabolism.
