= Long-chain-fatty-acid—(acyl-carrier-protein) ligase =

Long-chain-fatty-acid—[acyl-carrier-protein] ligase

Identifiers
- EC no.: 6.2.1.20
- CAS no.: 77322-37-3

Databases
- IntEnz: IntEnz view
- BRENDA: BRENDA entry
- ExPASy: NiceZyme view
- KEGG: KEGG entry
- MetaCyc: metabolic pathway
- PRIAM: profile
- PDB structures: RCSB PDB PDBe PDBsum
- Gene Ontology: AmiGO / QuickGO
Search
- PMC: articles
- PubMed: articles
- NCBI: proteins

In enzymology, a long-chain-fatty-acid—[acyl-carrier-protein] ligase (EC 6.2.1.20) is an enzyme that catalyzes the chemical reaction

ATP + an acid + [acyl-carrier-protein] $\rightleftharpoons$ AMP + diphosphate + acyl-[acyl-carrier-protein]

The 3 substrates of this enzyme are ATP, acid, and acyl-carrier-protein, whereas its 3 products are AMP, diphosphate, and [[acyl-[acyl-carrier-protein]]].

This enzyme belongs to the family of ligases, specifically those forming carbon-sulfur bonds as acid-thiol ligases. The systematic name of this enzyme class is long-chain-fatty-acid:[acyl-carrier-protein] ligase (AMP-forming). Other names in common use include acyl-[acyl-carrier-protein] synthetase, acyl-[acyl carrier protein] synthetase, acyl-ACP synthetase, acyl-[acyl-carrier-protein]synthetase, stearoyl-ACP synthetase, and acyl-acyl carrier protein synthetase. This enzyme participates in fatty acid metabolism.
