= UDP-N-acetylmuramoyl-tripeptide—D-alanyl-D-alanine ligase =

Class of enzymes

Identifiers
- EC no.: 6.3.2.10
- CAS no.: 9023-60-3

Databases
- IntEnz: IntEnz view
- BRENDA: BRENDA entry
- ExPASy: NiceZyme view
- KEGG: KEGG entry
- MetaCyc: metabolic pathway
- PRIAM: profile
- PDB structures: RCSB PDB PDBe PDBsum
- Gene Ontology: AmiGO / QuickGO
Search
- PMC: articles
- PubMed: articles
- NCBI: proteins

In enzymology, a UDP-N-acetylmuramoyl-tripeptide—D-alanyl-D-alanine ligase (EC 6.3.2.10) is an enzyme that catalyzes the chemical reaction

ATP + UDP-N-acetylmuramoyl-L-alanyl-gamma-D-glutamyl-L-lysine + D-alanyl-D-alanine $\rightleftharpoons$ ADP + phosphate + UDP-N-acetylmuramoyl-L-alanyl-gamma-D-glutamyl-L-lysyl-D-alanyl-D- alanine

The 3 substrates of this enzyme are ATP, UDP-N-acetylmuramoyl-L-alanyl-gamma-D-glutamyl-L-lysine, and D-alanyl-D-alanine, whereas its 4 products are ADP, phosphate, UDP-N-acetylmuramoyl-L-alanyl-gamma-D-glutamyl-L-lysyl-D-alanyl-D-alanine.

This enzyme belongs to the family of ligases, specifically those forming carbon-nitrogen bonds as acid-D-amino-acid ligases (peptide synthases).

== Nomenclature ==
The systematic name of this enzyme class is UDP-N-acetylmuramoyl-L-alanyl-D-glutamyl-L-lysine:D-alanyl-D-alanine ligase (ADP-forming). Other names in common use include MurF synthetase, UDP-N-acetylmuramoyl-L-alanyl-D-glutamyl-L-lysyl-D-alanyl-D-alanine, synthetase, UDP-N-acetylmuramoylalanyl-D-glutamyl-lysine-D-alanyl-D-alanine, ligase, uridine diphosphoacetylmuramoylpentapeptide synthetase, UDPacetylmuramoylpentapeptide synthetase, and UDP-MurNAc-L-Ala-D-Glu-L-Lys:D-Ala-D-Ala ligase. This enzyme participates in lysine biosynthesis and peptidoglycan biosynthesis.
