= (2,2,3-trimethyl-5-oxocyclopent-3-enyl)acetyl-CoA synthase =

Class of enzymes

(2,2,3-Trimethyl-5-oxocyclopent-3-enyl)acetyl-CoA synthase

Identifiers
- EC no.: 6.2.1.38

Databases
- IntEnz: IntEnz view
- BRENDA: BRENDA entry
- ExPASy: NiceZyme view
- KEGG: KEGG entry
- MetaCyc: metabolic pathway
- PRIAM: profile
- PDB structures: RCSB PDB PDBe PDBsum
Search
- PMC: articles
- PubMed: articles
- NCBI: proteins

(2,2,3-Trimethyl-5-oxocyclopent-3-enyl)acetyl-CoA synthase (EC 6.2.1.38, 2-oxo-Delta3-4,5,5-trimethylcyclopentenylacetyl-CoA synthetase) is an enzyme with systematic name ((1R)-2,2,3-trimethyl-5-oxocyclopent-3-enyl)acetate:CoA ligase (AMP-forming). This enzyme catalyses the following chemical reaction

[(1R)-2,2,3-trimethyl-5-oxocyclopent-3-enyl]acetate + ATP + CoA $\rightleftharpoons$ AMP + diphosphate + [(1R)-2,2,3-trimethyl-5-oxocyclopent-3-enyl]acetyl-CoA

This enzyme is isolated from Pseudomonas putida.
