= 4-phosphopantoate—beta-alanine ligase =

Class of enzymes

4-Phosphopantoate—β-alanine ligase

Identifiers
- EC no.: 6.3.2.36

Databases
- IntEnz: IntEnz view
- BRENDA: BRENDA entry
- ExPASy: NiceZyme view
- KEGG: KEGG entry
- MetaCyc: metabolic pathway
- PRIAM: profile
- PDB structures: RCSB PDB PDBe PDBsum
Search
- PMC: articles
- PubMed: articles
- NCBI: proteins

4-Phosphopantoate—β-alanine ligase (EC 6.3.2.36, phosphopantothenate synthetase, TK1686 protein) is an enzyme with systematic name (R)-4-phosphopantoate:beta-alanine ligase (AMP-forming). This enzyme catalyses the following chemical reaction

ATP + (R)-4-phosphopantoate + β-alanine $\rightleftharpoons$ AMP + diphosphate + (R)-4'-phosphopantothenate

The conversion of (R)-pantoate to (R)-4'-phosphopantothenate is part of the pathway leading to biosynthesis of 4'-phosphopantetheine.
