= Citrate—CoA ligase =

Enzyme

Identifiers
- EC no.: 6.2.1.18
- CAS no.: 856428-87-0

Databases
- IntEnz: IntEnz view
- BRENDA: BRENDA entry
- ExPASy: NiceZyme view
- KEGG: KEGG entry
- MetaCyc: metabolic pathway
- PRIAM: profile
- PDB structures: RCSB PDB PDBe PDBsum
- Gene Ontology: AmiGO / QuickGO
Search
- PMC: articles
- PubMed: articles
- NCBI: proteins

In enzymology, a citrate—CoA ligase (EC 6.2.1.18) is an enzyme that catalyzes the chemical reaction

ATP + citrate + CoA $\rightleftharpoons$ ADP + phosphate + (3S)-citryl-CoA

The 3 substrates of this enzyme are ATP, citrate, and CoA, whereas its 3 products are ADP, phosphate, and (3S)-citryl-CoA.

This enzyme belongs to the family of ligases, specifically those forming carbon-sulfur bonds as acid-thiol ligases. The systematic name of this enzyme class is citrate:CoA ligase (ADP-forming). Other names in common use include citryl-CoA synthetase, citrate:CoA ligase, and citrate thiokinase. This enzyme participates in citric acid cycle.
