= Tetrahydrofolate synthase =

Class of enzymes

Tetrahydrofolylpolyglutamate synthase

Identifiers
- EC no.: 6.3.2.17
- CAS no.: 63363-84-8

Databases
- IntEnz: IntEnz view
- BRENDA: BRENDA entry
- ExPASy: NiceZyme view
- KEGG: KEGG entry
- MetaCyc: metabolic pathway
- PRIAM: profile
- PDB structures: RCSB PDB PDBe PDBsum
- Gene Ontology: AmiGO / QuickGO
Search
- PMC: articles
- PubMed: articles
- NCBI: proteins

In enzymology, a tetrahydrofolate synthase (EC 6.3.2.17) is an enzyme that catalyzes the chemical reaction

ATP + tetrahydropteroyl-[gamma-Glu]n + L-glutamate $\rightleftharpoons$ ADP + phosphate + tetrahydropteroyl-[gamma-Glu]n^{+}1

The 3 substrates of this enzyme are ATP, [[tetrahydropteroyl-[gamma-Glu]n]], and L-glutamate, whereas its 3 products are ADP, phosphate, and [[tetrahydropteroyl-[gamma-Glu]n+1]].

This enzyme belongs to the family of ligases, specifically those forming carbon-nitrogen bonds as acid-D-amino-acid ligases (peptide synthases). The systematic name of this enzyme class is tetrahydropteroyl-gamma-polyglutamate:L-glutamate gamma-ligase (ADP-forming). This enzyme participates in folate biosynthesis.

== Structural studies ==
As of late 2007, 7 structures have been solved for this class of enzymes, with PDB accession codes 1FGS, 1JBV, 1JBW, 2GC5, 2GC6, 2GCA, and 2GCB.
