= UDP-N-acetylmuramoyl-L-alanyl-D-glutamate—L-lysine ligase =

Class of enzymes

Identifiers
- EC no.: 6.3.2.7
- CAS no.: 9023-51-2

Databases
- IntEnz: IntEnz view
- BRENDA: BRENDA entry
- ExPASy: NiceZyme view
- KEGG: KEGG entry
- MetaCyc: metabolic pathway
- PRIAM: profile
- PDB structures: RCSB PDB PDBe PDBsum
- Gene Ontology: AmiGO / QuickGO
Search
- PMC: articles
- PubMed: articles
- NCBI: proteins

In enzymology, a UDP-N-acetylmuramoyl-L-alanyl-D-glutamate—L-lysine ligase (EC 6.3.2.7) is an enzyme that catalyzes the chemical reaction

ATP + UDP-N-acetylmuramoyl-L-alanyl-D-glutamate + L-lysine $\rightleftharpoons$ ADP + phosphate + UDP-N-acetylmuramoyl-L-alanyl-D-glutamyl-L-lysine

The 3 substrates of this enzyme are ATP, UDP-N-acetylmuramoyl-L-alanyl-D-glutamate, and L-lysine, whereas its 3 products are ADP, phosphate, and UDP-N-acetylmuramoyl-L-alanyl-D-glutamyl-L-lysine.

This enzyme belongs to the family of ligases, specifically those forming carbon-nitrogen bonds as acid-D-amino-acid ligases (peptide synthases). The systematic name of this enzyme class is UDP-N-acetylmuramoyl-L-alanyl-D-glutamate:L-lysine gamma-ligase (ADP-forming). Other names in common use include MurE synthetase, UDP-N-acetylmuramoyl-L-alanyl-D-glutamyl-L-lysine synthetase, uridine diphospho-N-acetylmuramoylalanyl-D-glutamyllysine, synthetase, and UPD-MurNAc-L-Ala-D-Glu:L-Lys ligase. This enzyme participates in peptidoglycan biosynthesis.
