= Acetophenone carboxylase =

Class of enzymes

Identifiers
- EC no.: 6.4.1.8

Databases
- IntEnz: IntEnz view
- BRENDA: BRENDA entry
- ExPASy: NiceZyme view
- KEGG: KEGG entry
- MetaCyc: metabolic pathway
- PRIAM: profile
- PDB structures: RCSB PDB PDBe PDBsum
Search
- PMC: articles
- PubMed: articles
- NCBI: proteins

Acetophenone carboxylase (EC 6.4.1.8) is an enzyme with systematic name acetophenone:carbon-dioxide ligase (ADP-forming). This enzyme catalyses the following chemical reaction

2 ATP + acetophenone + HCO_{3}^{−} + H_{2}O + H^{+} $\rightleftharpoons$ 2 ADP + 2 phosphate + 3-oxo-3-phenylpropanoate

The enzyme is involved in anaerobic degradation of ethylbenzene.
