= Malate—CoA ligase =

Identifiers
- EC no.: 6.2.1.9
- CAS no.: 37318-58-4

Databases
- IntEnz: IntEnz view
- BRENDA: BRENDA entry
- ExPASy: NiceZyme view
- KEGG: KEGG entry
- MetaCyc: metabolic pathway
- PRIAM: profile
- PDB structures: RCSB PDB PDBe PDBsum
- Gene Ontology: AmiGO / QuickGO
Search
- PMC: articles
- PubMed: articles
- NCBI: proteins

In enzymology, a malate—CoA ligase (EC 6.2.1.9) is an enzyme that catalyzes the chemical reaction

ATP + malate + CoA $\rightleftharpoons$ ADP + phosphate + malyl-CoA

The 3 substrates of this enzyme are ATP, malate, and CoA, whereas its 3 products are ADP, phosphate, and malyl-CoA.

This enzyme belongs to the family of ligases, specifically those forming carbon-sulfur bonds as acid-thiol ligases. The systematic name of this enzyme class is malate:CoA ligase (ADP-forming). Other names in common use include malyl-CoA synthetase, malyl coenzyme A synthetase, and malate thiokinase. This enzyme participates in glyoxylate and dicarboxylate metabolism.
