= L-cysteine:1D-myo-inositol 2-amino-2-deoxy-alpha-D-glucopyranoside ligase =

Class of enzymes

L-cysteine:1D-myo-inositol 2-amino-2-deoxy-α-D-glucopyranoside ligase

Identifiers
- EC no.: 6.3.1.13

Databases
- BRENDA: enzyme data
- ExPASy: NiceZyme view
- KEGG: enzyme entry
- MetaCyc: metabolic pathway
- Rhea: reactions
- PDB structures: RCSB PDB PDBe PDBsum
Search
- PMC: articles
- PubMed: articles
- NCBI: proteins

L-cysteine:1D-myo-inositol 2-amino-2-deoxy-alpha-D-glucopyranoside ligase (EC 6.3.1.13, MshC, MshC ligase, Cys:GlcN-Ins ligase, mycothiol ligase) is an enzyme with systematic name L-cysteine:1-O-(2-amino-2-deoxy-alpha-D-glucopyranosyl)-1D-myo-inositol ligase (AMP-forming). This enzyme catalyses the following chemical reaction

1-O-(2-amino-2-deoxy-alpha-D-glucopyranosyl)-1D-myo-inositol + L-cysteine + ATP $\rightleftharpoons$ 1-O-[2-(L-cysteinamido)-2-deoxy-alpha-D-glucopyranosyl]-1D-myo-inositol + AMP + diphosphate

This enzyme participates in the biosynthesis of mycothiol.
