= O-phospho-L-serine—tRNA ligase =

O-Phospho-L-serine—tRNA ligase

Identifiers
- EC no.: 6.1.1.27

Databases
- IntEnz: IntEnz view
- BRENDA: BRENDA entry
- ExPASy: NiceZyme view
- KEGG: KEGG entry
- MetaCyc: metabolic pathway
- PRIAM: profile
- PDB structures: RCSB PDB PDBe PDBsum
Search
- PMC: articles
- PubMed: articles
- NCBI: proteins

O-phospho-L-serine—tRNA ligase (EC 6.1.1.27, O-phosphoseryl-tRNA ligase, non-canonical O-phosphoseryl-tRNA synthetase, SepRS) is an enzyme with systematic name O-phospho-L-serine:tRNACys ligase (AMP-forming). This enzyme catalyses the following chemical reaction:

ATP + O-phospho-L-serine + tRNACys $\rightleftharpoons$ AMP + diphosphate + O-phospho-L-seryl-tRNACys

In organisms like Archaeoglobus fulgidus, this enzyme ligates O-phosphoserine to tRNACys.
