= 7-cyano-7-deazaguanine synthase =

Class of enzymes

7-Cyano-7-deazaguanine synthase

Identifiers
- EC no.: 6.3.4.20

Databases
- IntEnz: IntEnz view
- BRENDA: BRENDA entry
- ExPASy: NiceZyme view
- KEGG: KEGG entry
- MetaCyc: metabolic pathway
- PRIAM: profile
- PDB structures: RCSB PDB PDBe PDBsum
Search
- PMC: articles
- PubMed: articles
- NCBI: proteins

7-cyano-7-deazaguanine synthase (EC 6.3.4.20, preQ0 synthase, 7-cyano-7-carbaguanine synthase, queC (gene)) is an enzyme with systematic name 7-carboxy-7-carbaguanine:ammonia ligase (ADP-forming). This enzyme catalyses the following chemical reaction

7-carboxy-7-carbaguanine + NH_{3} + ATP $\rightleftharpoons$ 7-cyano-7-carbaguanine + ADP + phosphate + H_{2}O

This enzyme binds Zn^{2+}.
