= 3-hydroxypropionyl-CoA synthase =

Class of enzymes

3-Hydroxypropionyl-CoA synthase

Identifiers
- EC no.: 6.2.1.36

Databases
- IntEnz: IntEnz view
- BRENDA: BRENDA entry
- ExPASy: NiceZyme view
- KEGG: KEGG entry
- MetaCyc: metabolic pathway
- PRIAM: profile
- PDB structures: RCSB PDB PDBe PDBsum
Search
- PMC: articles
- PubMed: articles
- NCBI: proteins

3-Hydroxypropionyl-CoA synthase (EC 6.2.1.36, 3-hydroxypropionyl-CoA synthetase (AMP-forming), 3-hydroxypropionate-CoA ligase) is an enzyme with systematic name hydroxypropionate:CoA ligase (AMP-forming). This enzyme catalyses the following chemical reaction

3-hydroxypropionate + ATP + CoA $\rightleftharpoons$ 3-hydroxypropionyl-CoA + AMP + diphosphate

This enzyme catalyses a step in the 3-hydroxypropionate/4-hydroxybutyrate cycle.
