= Cyclopeptine synthase =

Identifiers
- EC no.: 6.3.2.40

Databases
- BRENDA: enzyme data
- ExPASy: NiceZyme view
- KEGG: enzyme entry
- MetaCyc: metabolic pathway
- Rhea: reactions
- PDB structures: RCSB PDB PDBe PDBsum
- Gene Ontology: AmiGO / QuickGO
Search
- PMC: articles
- PubMed: articles
- NCBI: proteins

Cyclopeptine synthase (EC 6.3.2.40) is an enzyme that catalyzes the chemical reaction

anthranilate + L-phenylalanine + S-adenosyl-L-methionine + 2 ATP $\rightleftharpoons$ cyclopeptine + 2 AMP + S-adenosyl-L-homocysteine + 2 diphosphate + 2 H(+)

In Penicillium cyclopium, cyclopeptine synthase is important for benzodiazepine alkaloid biosynthesis.

== Enzyme Classification History ==
Formerly, cyclopentine synthase activity was classified under two separate enzymes.

- anthranilate adenylyltransferase (EC 2.7.7.55) catalyzes the partial reaction

ATP + anthranilate $\rightleftharpoons$ diphosphate + N-adenylylanthranilate

- phenylalanine adenylyltransferase (EC 2.7.7.54) catalyzes the partial reaction

ATP + L-phenylalanine $\rightleftharpoons$ diphosphate + N-adenylyl-L-phenylalanine

EC 2.7.7.54 and EC 2.7.7.55 were reclassified and merged into EC 6.3.2.40.
