= N2-citryl-N6-acetyl-N6-hydroxylysine synthase =

Class of enzymes

N^{2}-citryl-N^{6}-acetyl-N^{6}-hydroxylysine synthase

Identifiers
- EC no.: 6.3.2.38

Databases
- IntEnz: IntEnz view
- BRENDA: BRENDA entry
- ExPASy: NiceZyme view
- KEGG: KEGG entry
- MetaCyc: metabolic pathway
- PRIAM: profile
- PDB structures: RCSB PDB PDBe PDBsum
Search
- PMC: articles
- PubMed: articles
- NCBI: proteins

N^{2}-citryl-N^{6}-acetyl-N^{6}-hydroxylysine synthase (EC 6.3.2.38, N(alpha)-citryl-N(epsilon)-acetyl-N(epsilon)-hydroxylysine synthase, iucA (gene)) is an enzyme with systematic name citrate:N^{6}-acetyl-N^{6}-hydroxy-L-lysine ligase (ADP-forming). This enzyme catalyses the following chemical reaction

2 ATP + citrate + N^{6}-acetyl-N^{6}-hydroxy-L-lysine + H_{2}O $\rightleftharpoons$ 2 ADP + 2 phosphate + N^{2}-citryl-N^{6}-acetyl-N^{6}-hydroxy-L-lysine

This enzyme requires Mg^{2+}.
