= Coenzyme gamma-F420-2:alpha-L-glutamate ligase =

Class of enzymes

Coenzyme gamma-F_{420}-2:α-L-glutamate ligase

Identifiers
- EC no.: 6.3.2.32

Databases
- IntEnz: IntEnz view
- BRENDA: BRENDA entry
- ExPASy: NiceZyme view
- KEGG: KEGG entry
- MetaCyc: metabolic pathway
- PRIAM: profile
- PDB structures: RCSB PDB PDBe PDBsum
Search
- PMC: articles
- PubMed: articles
- NCBI: proteins

Coenzyme gamma-F_{420}-2:α-L-glutamate ligase (EC 6.3.2.32, MJ1001, CofF protein, gamma-F420-2:alpha-L-glutamate ligase) is an enzyme with systematic name L-glutamate:coenzyme gamma-F420-2 (ADP-forming). This enzyme catalyses the following chemical reaction

ATP + coenzyme γ-F_{420}-2 + L-glutamate $\rightleftharpoons$ ADP + phosphate + coenzyme α-F_{420}-3

The enzyme caps the γ-glutamyl tail of the hydride carrier [[coenzyme F_{420}]].
