= (butirosin acyl-carrier protein)—L-glutamate ligase =

Class of enzymes

Identifiers
- EC no.: 6.2.1.39

Databases
- IntEnz: IntEnz view
- BRENDA: BRENDA entry
- ExPASy: NiceZyme view
- KEGG: KEGG entry
- MetaCyc: metabolic pathway
- PRIAM: profile
- PDB structures: RCSB PDB PDBe PDBsum
Search
- PMC: articles
- PubMed: articles
- NCBI: proteins

(Butirosin acyl-carrier protein)—L-glutamate ligase (EC 6.2.1.39, [BtrI acyl-carrier protein]—L-glutamate ligase, BtrJ) is an enzyme with systematic name (BtrI acyl-carrier protein):L-glutamate ligase (ADP-forming). This enzyme catalyses the following chemical reaction

(1) ATP + L-glutamate + BtrI acyl-carrier protein $\rightleftharpoons$ ADP + phosphate + L-glutamyl-[BtrI acyl-carrier protein]
(2) ATP + L-glutamate + 4-amino butanoyl-[BtrI acyl-carrier protein] $\rightleftharpoons$ ADP + phosphate + 4-(gamma-L-glutamylamino)butanoyl-[BtrI acyl-carrier protein]

This enzyme catalyses two steps in the biosynthesis of the side chain of the aminoglycoside antibiotics of the butirosin family.
