= NAD+ synthase (glutamine-hydrolysing) =

NAD^{+} synthase (glutamine-hydrolyzing)
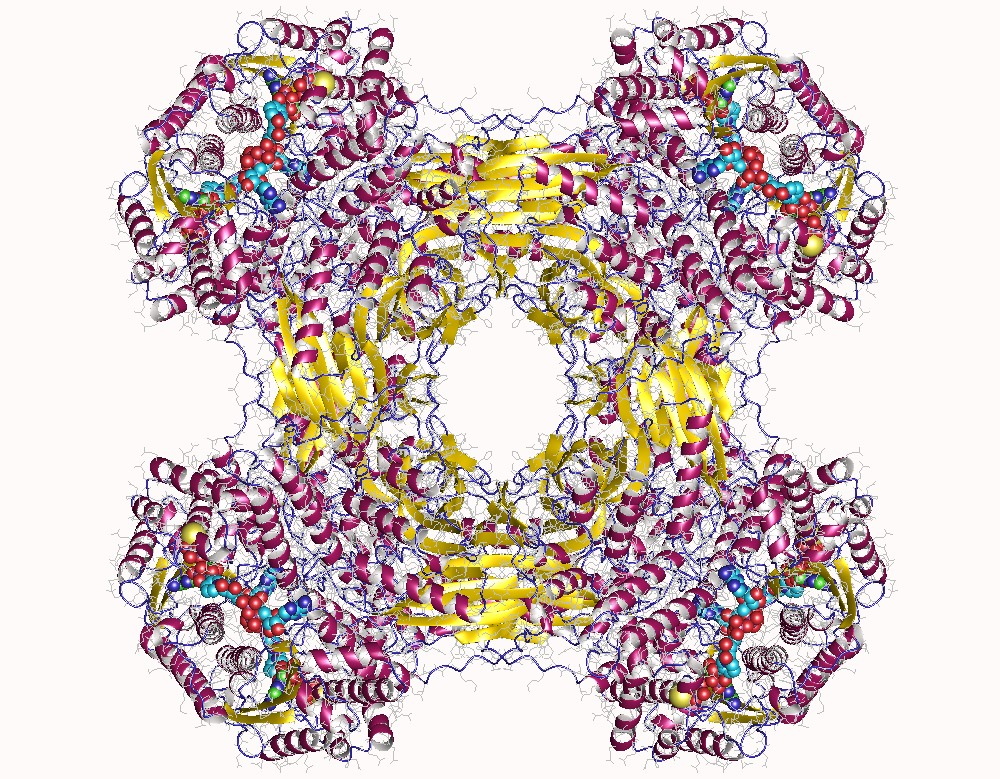
- Glutamine-dependent NAD+ synthetase homooctamer, Human

Identifiers
- EC no.: 6.3.5.1
- CAS no.: 37318-70-0

Databases
- IntEnz: IntEnz view
- BRENDA: BRENDA entry
- ExPASy: NiceZyme view
- KEGG: KEGG entry
- MetaCyc: metabolic pathway
- PRIAM: profile
- PDB structures: RCSB PDB PDBe PDBsum
- Gene Ontology: AmiGO / QuickGO
Search
- PMC: articles
- PubMed: articles
- NCBI: proteins

In enzymology, a NAD^{+} synthase (glutamine-hydrolysing) (EC 6.3.5.1) is an enzyme that catalyzes the chemical reaction

ATP + deamido-NAD^{+} + L-glutamine + H_{2}O $\rightleftharpoons$ AMP + diphosphate + NAD^{+} + L-glutamate. In eukaryotes, this enzyme contains a glutaminase domain related to nitrilase.

The substrates of this enzyme are ATP, deamido-NAD+, L-glutamine, and H_{2}O, whereas its 4 products are AMP, diphosphate, NAD^{+}, and glutamate

This enzyme participates in glutamate metabolism and nicotinate and nicotinamide metabolism.

== Nomenclature ==
This enzyme belongs to the family of ligases, specifically those forming carbon-nitrogen bonds carbon-nitrogen ligases with glutamine as amido-N-donor. The systematic name of this enzyme class is deamido-NAD+:L-glutamine amido-ligase (AMP-forming).
