= D-alanine—(R)-lactate ligase =

D-Alanine—(R)-lactate ligase

Identifiers
- EC no.: 6.1.2.1

Databases
- IntEnz: IntEnz view
- BRENDA: BRENDA entry
- ExPASy: NiceZyme view
- KEGG: KEGG entry
- MetaCyc: metabolic pathway
- PRIAM: profile
- PDB structures: RCSB PDB PDBe PDBsum
Search
- PMC: articles
- PubMed: articles
- NCBI: proteins

D-alanine—(R)-lactate ligase (EC 6.1.2.1, VanA, VanB, VanD) is an enzyme with systematic name D-alanine:(R)-lactate ligase (ADP-forming). This enzyme catalyses the following chemical reaction

D-alanine + (R)-lactate + ATP $\rightleftharpoons$ D-alanyl-(R)-lactate + ADP + phosphate

The product of this enzyme can be incorporated into the peptidoglycan pentapeptide instead of the usual D-alanyl-D-alanine dipeptide.
