= Succinate—CoA ligase (ADP-forming) =

succinate-CoA ligase (ADP-forming)
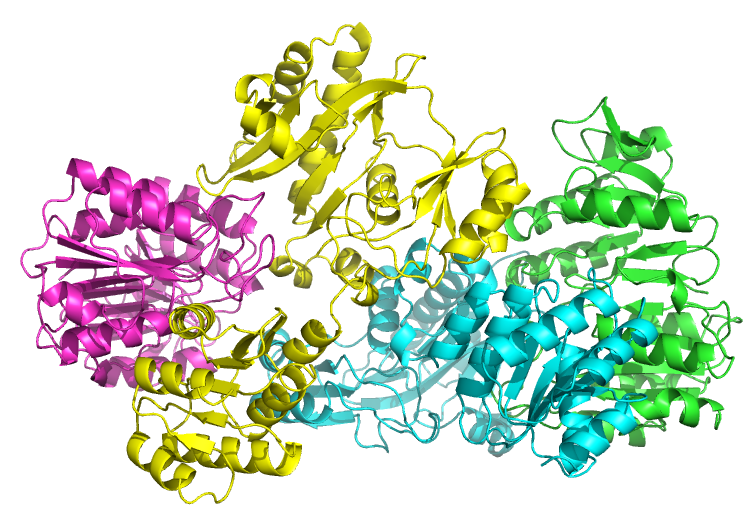
- Succinyl-COA synthetase from Escherichia coli. PDB 2scu

Identifiers
- EC no.: 6.2.1.5
- CAS no.: 9080-33-5

Databases
- IntEnz: IntEnz view
- BRENDA: BRENDA entry
- ExPASy: NiceZyme view
- KEGG: KEGG entry
- MetaCyc: metabolic pathway
- PRIAM: profile
- PDB structures: RCSB PDB PDBe PDBsum
- Gene Ontology: AmiGO / QuickGO
Search
- PMC: articles
- PubMed: articles
- NCBI: proteins

In enzymology, a succinate-CoA ligase (ADP-forming) (EC 6.2.1.5) is an enzyme that catalyzes the chemical reaction

ATP + succinate + CoA $\rightleftharpoons$ ADP + phosphate + succinyl-CoA

The 3 substrates of this enzyme are ATP, succinate, and CoA, whereas its 3 products are ADP, phosphate, and succinyl-CoA.

This enzyme belongs to the family of ligases, specifically those forming carbon-sulfur bonds as acid-thiol ligases. The systematic name of this enzyme class is succinate:CoA ligase (ADP-forming). Other names in common use include succinyl-CoA synthetase (ADP-forming), succinic thiokinase, succinate thiokinase, succinyl-CoA synthetase, succinyl coenzyme A synthetase (adenosine diphosphate-forming), succinyl coenzyme A synthetase, A-STK (adenin nucleotide-linked succinate thiokinase), STK, and A-SCS. This enzyme participates in 4 metabolic pathways: Citric acid cycle, propanoate metabolism, c5-branched dibasic acid metabolism, and reductive carboxylate cycle (CO_{2} fixation).

== Structural studies ==
As of late 2007, 12 structures have been solved for this class of enzymes, with PDB accession codes 1CQI, 1CQJ, 1JKJ, 1JLL, 1OI7, 1SCU, 2NU6, 2NU7, 2NU8, 2NU9, 2NUA, and 2SCU.
