= Succinate—CoA ligase (GDP-forming) =

succinate—CoA ligase (GDP-forming)
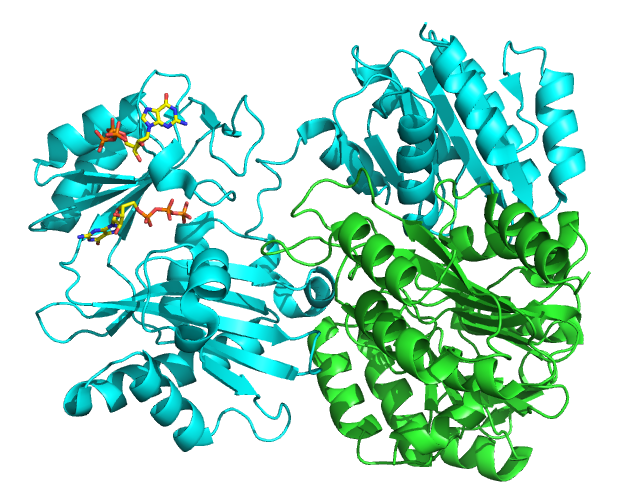
- Pig GTP-specific succinyl-CoA synthetase with GTP. PDB 2fp4

Identifiers
- EC no.: 6.2.1.4
- CAS no.: 9014-36-2

Databases
- IntEnz: IntEnz view
- BRENDA: BRENDA entry
- ExPASy: NiceZyme view
- KEGG: KEGG entry
- MetaCyc: metabolic pathway
- PRIAM: profile
- PDB structures: RCSB PDB PDBe PDBsum
- Gene Ontology: AmiGO / QuickGO
Search
- PMC: articles
- PubMed: articles
- NCBI: proteins

In enzymology, a succinate—CoA ligase (GDP-forming) (EC 6.2.1.4) is an enzyme that catalyzes the chemical reaction

GTP + succinate + CoA $\rightleftharpoons$ GDP + phosphate + succinyl-CoA

The 3 substrates of this enzyme are GTP, succinate, and CoA, whereas its 3 products are GDP, phosphate, and succinyl-CoA.

This enzyme belongs to the family of ligases, specifically those forming carbon-sulfur bonds as acid-thiol ligases. The systematic name of this enzyme class is succinate:CoA ligase (GDP-forming). Other names in common use include succinyl-CoA synthetase (GDP-forming), succinyl coenzyme A synthetase (guanosine diphosphate-forming), succinate thiokinase, succinic thiokinase, succinyl coenzyme A synthetase, succinate-phosphorylating enzyme, P-enzyme, SCS, G-STK, succinyl coenzyme A synthetase (GDP-forming), succinyl CoA synthetase, and succinyl coenzyme A synthetase. This enzyme participates in the citric acid cycle and propanoate metabolism.

== Structural studies ==
As of late 2007, 6 structures have been solved for this class of enzymes, with PDB accession codes 1EUC, 1EUD, 2FP4, 2FPG, 2FPI, and 2FPP.
