= Ligase =

Class of enzymes that can form bonds between molecules

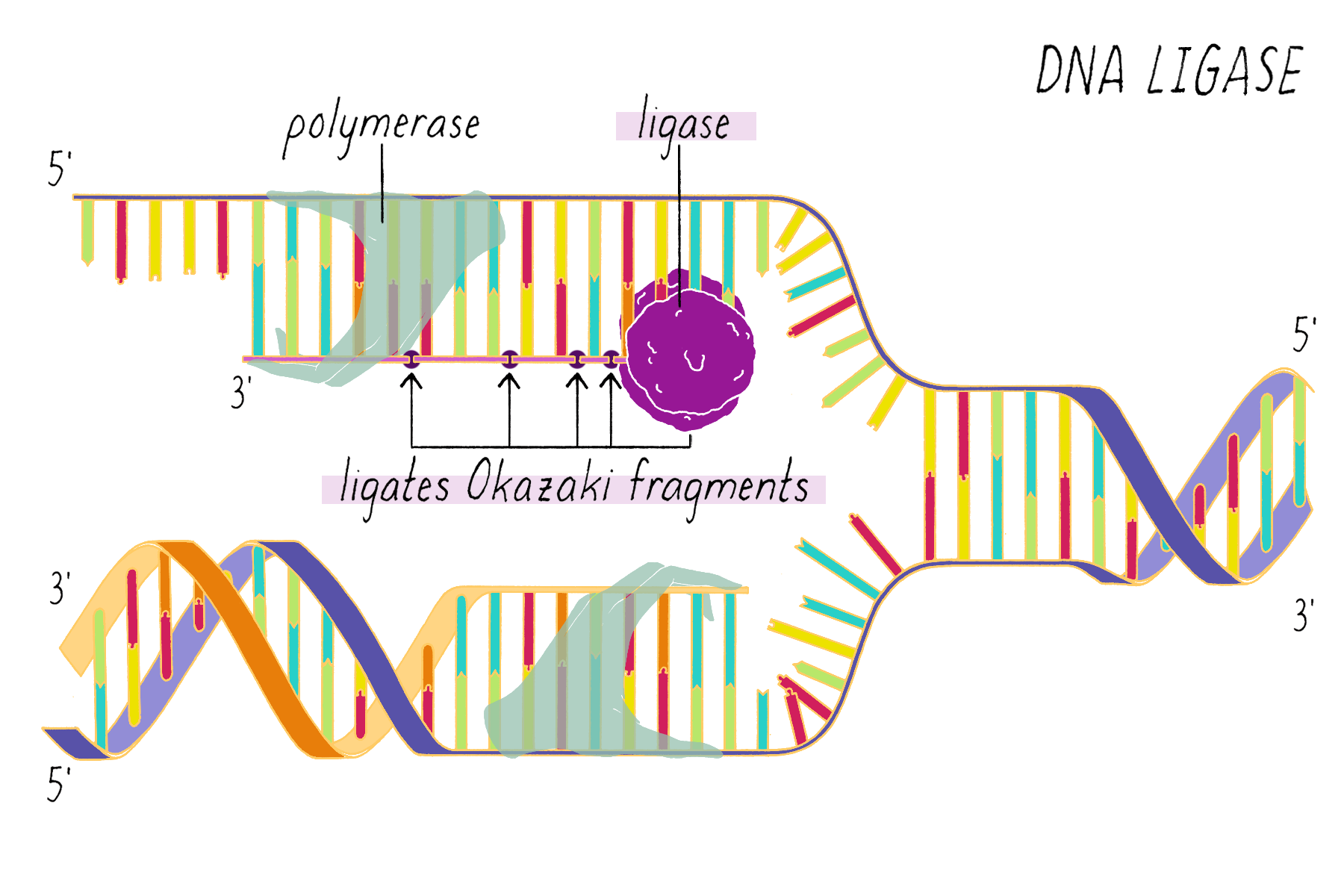
An enzyme that joins two pieces of DNA by catalyzing the formation of a phosphodiester bond. DNA ligase is used in DNA replication, repair, and molecular biology laboratories.

In biochemistry, a ligase is an enzyme that can catalyze the joining (ligation) of two molecules by forming a new chemical bond. This is typically via hydrolysis of a small pendant chemical group on one of the molecules, typically resulting in the formation of new C-O, C-S, or C-N bonds. For example, DNA ligase can join two complementary fragments of nucleic acid by forming phosphodiester bonds, and repair single-stranded breaks that arise in double stranded DNA during replication.

In general, a ligase catalyzes the following dehydration reaction, thus joining molecules A and B:

A-OH + B-H → A–B + H_{2}O

== Nomenclature ==
The naming of ligases is inconsistent and so these enzymes are commonly known by several different names. Generally, the common names of ligases include the word "ligase", such as in DNA ligase, an enzyme commonly used in molecular biology laboratories to join together DNA fragments. However, many common names use the term "synthetase" or "synthase" instead, because they are used to synthesize new molecules. There are also some ligases that use the name "carboxylase" to indicate that the enzyme specifically catalyzes a carboxylation reaction.

To note: biochemical nomenclature has sometimes distinguished synthetases from synthases and sometimes treated the words as synonyms. Commonly, the two terms are used interchangeably and are both used to describe ligases.

== Classification ==
Ligases are classified as EC 6 in the EC number classification of enzymes. Ligases can be further classified into six subclasses:

- EC 6.1 includes ligases used to form carbon-oxygen bonds
- EC 6.2 includes ligases used to form carbon-sulfur bonds
- EC 6.3 includes ligases used to form carbon-nitrogen bonds (including argininosuccinate synthetase)
- EC 6.4 includes ligases used to form carbon-carbon bonds, such as acetyl-CoA carboxylase
- EC 6.5 includes ligases used to form phosphoric ester bonds, such as DNA ligase
- EC 6.6 includes ligases used to form nitrogen-metal bonds, as in the chelatases

== Membrane-associated ligases ==
Some ligases associate with biological membranes as peripheral membrane proteins or anchored through a single transmembrane helix, for example certain ubiquitin ligase related proteins.

== Etymology and pronunciation ==
The word ligase uses combining forms of lig- (from the Latin verb ligāre, "to bind" or "to tie together") + -ase (denoting an enzyme), yielding "binding enzyme".

== See also ==
- DNA ligase
- Acetyl-CoA carboxylase
- Nuclease
- Protease
- Ubiquitin ligase
