= Carnosinemia =

Disease

- Other names: Carnosinase deficiency or Aminoacyl-histidine dipeptidase deficiency,
- Carnosine

Carnosinemia is a rare autosomal recessive metabolic disorder caused by a deficiency of carnosinase, a dipeptidase (a type of enzyme that splits dipeptides into their two amino acid constituents).

Carnosine is a dipeptide composed of beta-alanine and histidine, and is found in skeletal muscle and cells of the nervous system. This disorder results in an excess of carnosine in the urine, cerebrospinal fluid, blood, and nervous tissue. Neurological disorders associated with a deficiency of carnosinase, and the resulting carnosinemia ("carnosine in the blood") are common.

== Symptoms and signs ==
A variety of neurological symptoms have been associated with carnosinemia. They include: hypotonia, developmental delay, intellectual disability, degeneration of axons, sensory neuropathy, tremors, demyelinization, gray matter anomalies, myoclonic seizures, and loss of purkinje fibers.

== Genetics ==
Carnosinemia has an autosomal recessive pattern of inheritance.

The gene for carnosinase is located on chromosome 18, an autosome. The carnosine dipeptidase-1 gene (CNDP1) controls tissue and serum carnosinase. Mutations in CNDP1 are responsible for carnosinase deficiency, resulting in carnosinemia.

Carnosinemia is an autosomal recessive disorder, which means the defective gene is located on an autosome, and two copies of the defective gene - one from each parent - are required to inherit the disorder. The parents of an individual with an autosomal recessive disorder both carry one copy of the defective gene, but usually do not experience any signs or symptoms of the disorder.

== Diagnosis ==
=== Types ===
Carnosinase in humans has two forms:

1. Cellular, or tissue carnosinase: This form of the enzyme is found in every bodily tissue. It is a dimer, and hydrolyzes both carnosine and anserine, preferring dipeptides that have a histidine monomer in the C-terminus position. Tissue carnosinase is often considered a "nonspecific dipeptidase", based in part on its ability to hydrolyze a range of dipeptide substrates, including those belonging to prolinase.

2. Serum carnosinase: This is the carnosinase found in the blood plasma. Deficiency of this form of carnosinase, along with carnosinuria ("carnosine in the urine"), is the usual metabolic indicator of systemic carnosinase deficiency. Serum carnosinase is a glycoprotein, and splits free carnosine and anserine in the blood. This form of the dipeptidase is not found in human blood until late infancy, slowly rising to adult levels by age 15. Unlike tissue carnosinase, serum carnosinase also hydrolyzes the GABA metabolite homocarnosine. Homocarnosinosis, a neurological disorder resulting in an excess of homocarnosine in the brain, though unaffected by tissue carnosinase, is caused by a deficiency of serum carnosinase in its ability to hydrolyze homocarnosine.

A deficiency of tissue and serum carnosinase, with serum being an indicator, is the underlying metabolic cause of carnosinemia.

== Treatment ==
There is currently no cure for carnosinemia, but treatment focuses on managing symptoms and preventing complications. A strict meat-free diet can help with symptoms, but it will not cure the disease. Carnosinemia patients and their families should seek genetic counseling.

== See also ==
- Histidinemia
- Hyperprolinemia
- Inborn errors of metabolism
- Proline
