= Beta-Ala-His dipeptidase =

Enzyme

Identifiers
- EC no.: 3.4.13.20
- CAS no.: 525589-43-9

Databases
- IntEnz: IntEnz view
- BRENDA: BRENDA entry
- ExPASy: NiceZyme view
- KEGG: KEGG entry
- MetaCyc: metabolic pathway
- PRIAM: profile
- PDB structures: RCSB PDB PDBe PDBsum
Search
- PMC: articles
- PubMed: articles
- NCBI: proteins

Beta-Ala-His dipeptidase (EC 3.4.13.20, serum carnosinase) is an enzyme. This enzyme catalyses the following chemical reaction

Preferential hydrolysis of the beta-Ala!His dipeptide (carnosine), and also anserine, Xaa!His dipeptides and other dipeptides including homocarnosine

This enzyme is present in the serum of humans and higher primates.
