= X-methyl-His dipeptidase =

Xaa-methyl-His dipeptidase

Identifiers
- EC no.: 3.4.13.5
- CAS no.: 9027-38-7

Databases
- IntEnz: IntEnz view
- BRENDA: BRENDA entry
- ExPASy: NiceZyme view
- KEGG: KEGG entry
- MetaCyc: metabolic pathway
- PRIAM: profile
- PDB structures: RCSB PDB PDBe PDBsum
Search
- PMC: articles
- PubMed: articles
- NCBI: proteins

Xaa-methyl-His dipeptidase (EC 3.4.13.5, anserinase, aminoacyl-methylhistidine dipeptidase, acetylhistidine deacetylase, N-acetylhistidine deacetylase, alpha-N-acetyl-L-histidine aminohydrolase) is an enzyme. This enzyme catalyses the following chemical reaction

Hydrolysis of anserine (beta-alanyl!Npi-methyl-L-histidine), carnosine, homocarnosine, glycyl!leucine and other dipeptides with broad specificity
