= Maysuryan =

Maysuryan (Russian: Майсурян) is a surname. Notable people with the surname include:

- Alexander Maysuryan (born 1969), Russian author and political activist
- Nikolay Maysuryan (1896-1967), Soviet scientist, Academician of the VASKhNIL
