= C7H14N2O3S =

The molecular formula C_{7}H_{14}N_{2}O_{3}S may refer to:

- Glycylmethionine
- Methionylglycine
