= Botanical Garden named after Rostovtsev =

- Ботанический сад имени С. И. Ростовцева
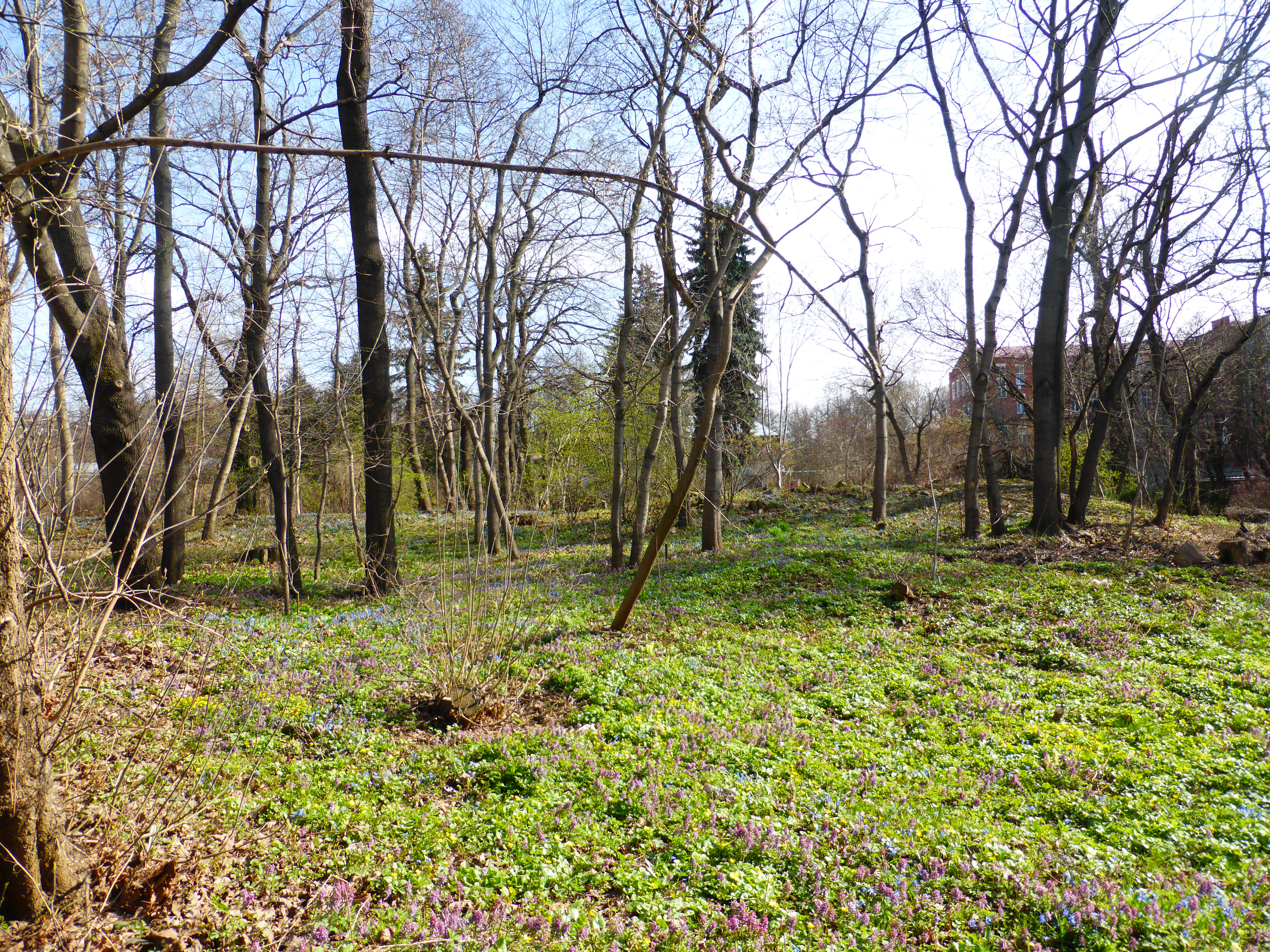
- Interactive map of Botanical Garden named after Rostovtsev
- Location: Moscow, Timiryazev Agricultural Academy
- Coordinates: 55°50′04″N 37°32′43″E
- Opening date: 1895

The Botanical Garden named after S. I. Rostovtsev (Russian: Ботанический сад имени С. И. Ростовцева) is a Botanical Garden in Moscow at the Timiryazev Agricultural Academy. Founded in 1895 on the initiative of botanist S. I. Rostovtsev. The garden area is about 1.2 hectares. The Botanical Garden is part of the complex reserve "Petrovsko-Razumovskoye" and has the status of a specially protected natural area of federal significance.

== History ==
The founder of the botanical garden S. I. Rostovtsev will divide it into 3 departments: systematic, biological and experimental. In the systematic department, students studied the systematics of plants. The biological department was designed to grow plants that require special conditions. In the experimental department, students could observe the growth of plants.

After the death of S. I. Rostovtsev, the botanical garden was headed by Professor N. N. Khudyakov, and since 1919 - Professor V. I. Taliev. In 1934, the management of the garden took over Professor P. M. Zhukovsky. With it, the garden area increased almost 5-fold, and the number of species was about 3000. During the Great Patriotic War, the garden was badly damaged, because one of Moscow's defensive fortifications passed through its territory. From 1953 to 1985, the department of botany and a botanical garden was headed by Professor V. G. Khrzhanovsky. When it was built a greenhouse for subtropical plants.

== Modernity ==
At present, on the basis of the botanical garden, summer scientific research and production practice is conducted. Students study there ways of plant reproduction, morphogenesis, as well as technologies of landscape design. Periodically free excursions are organized for all comers.

In the botanical garden there are landscapes, ornamental and experimental sites, as well as a greenhouse with an area of about 400 m². According to data for 2012, in the botanical garden there are about 600 species and forms of open ground and about 500 - closed ground. Cultivated 9 species, listed in the Red Book of Russia.
