= Nikolay Maysuryan =

Soviet scientist

- Born: Nikolay Aleksandrovich Maysuryan; November 11, 1896; Tiflis, Tiflis Governorate, Caucasus Viceroyalty, Russian Empire
- Died: November 22, 1967 (aged 71); Tbilisi, Georgian SSR, Soviet Union
- Education: Georgian Technical University
- Awards: Order of Lenin; Order of the Red Banner of Labour

Nikolay Aleksandrovich Maysuryan (Russian: Николай Александрович Майсурян; Armenian: Նիկոլայ Ալեքսանդրի Մայսուրյան; November 11, 1896 – November 22, 1967) was a Soviet scientist, Academician of the VASKhNIL (since 1958) and Correspondent Member of the Armenian National Academy of Sciences (since 1945), Doktor Nauk in Agricultural Sciences (1944) and Professor at the Russian State Agrarian University – Moscow Timiryazev Agricultural Academy.

He graduated from the Georgian Technical University in 1922. He was a student of Dmitry Pryanishnikov.

In 1934, he received the title of Professor.

From 1941 to 1961, Professor Maysuryan served as the Dean of the Faculty of Agronomy of the Moscow Timiryazev Agricultural Academy.

From 1958 to 1967, Professor Maysuryan headed the Department of Horticulture at the Moscow Timiryazev Agricultural Academy.

Member of the Communist Party of the Soviet Union since 1953.

He was awarded:

- 2 Orders of Lenin (1953, 1965)
- Order of the Red Banner of Labour (1945)

He's the author of about 300 scientific papers.

His grandson Alexander Maysuryan is a Russian author.

== Sources ==
- "МАЙСУРЯН Николай Александрович" [MAYSURYAN Nikolay Aleksandrovich] (in Russian). Archived from the original on 2008-02-01.
