= Dipeptidase M =

Dipeptidase M may refer to one of two enzymes:

- X-His dipeptidase
- Met-X dipeptidase
