= Conductivity (non-aqueous) =

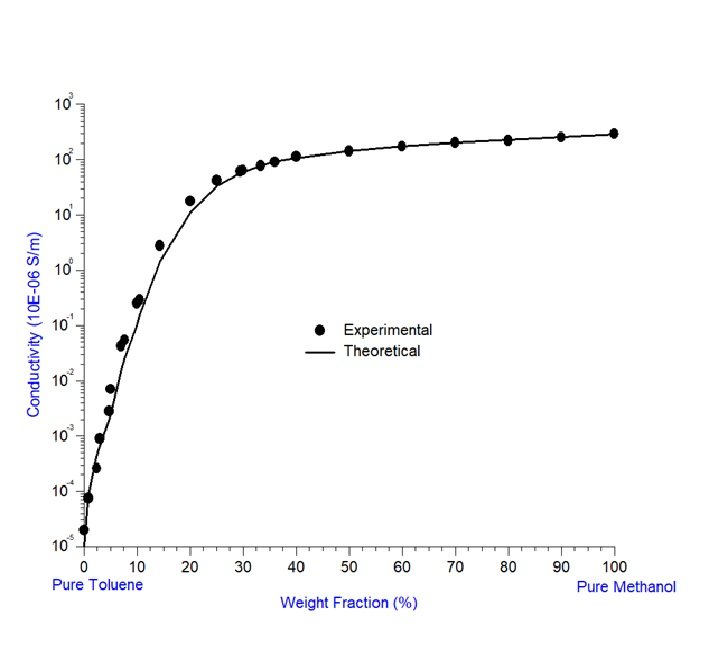
Conductivity of toluene-methanol mixture within full composition range. Points – experiment. Line – results of calculation using model described in section Theory

Nonaqueous electric conductivity is a physical parameter that characterizes the ability of non-aqueous liquids and solutions to conduct electric current. Similarly to conductivity (electrolytic) in aqueous solutions, nonaqueous conductivity is associated with the motion of ions. However, the difference between conductivity of aqueous solutions and nonaqueous solutions (based on non-polar liquids, like toluene, hexane) is significant. For example, the conductivity of aqueous standard is 0.1413 S/m, whereas conductivity of non-polar toluene is around 10^{−10} S/m. The typical range of nonaqueous solutions conductivity is shown in the figure on the right. This large difference in conductivity is associated with qualitative differences in the ionization of water and of the non-polar liquids. The chemical nature of possible electrolytes is very different, as well as solvation of ions, and ions interactions. Accordingly, the measurement methods are also very different due to large differences in measured parameters.

== History ==
The discovery of non-aqueous liquids' ability to conduct electricity dates back to the pioneering studies by Michael Faraday in the mid-19th century. The next step was apparently initiated by Arrhenius and Ostwald according to the publication authored by Kablukov in 1889. Kablukoff conducted his studies in Leipzig University and expressed acknowledgment to Ostwald and Arrhenius for their support. He studied the conductivity of hydrochloric acid in benzene, hexane, and ether. He discovered that molar conductivity decays with dilution, opposite to what happens in aqueous solutions. The second publication on the subject was made in 1906 by Vladimir Plotnikow working in Kiev. He studied the conductivities of methylbromide and ether. These liquids on their own are practically non-conducting, whereas their mixture becomes conducting. He pointed out that dielectric constant plays important role in this phenomenon.

== Classification of liquids according to dielectric constant ==
The classification of liquids based on their dielectric constant ε was introduced by Johannes Lyklema as following

- non-polar if ε < 5
- low-polar 5 < ε < 12
- semi-polar 12 < ε < 80
- polar ε >= 80

The polarity of a liquid declines with decreasing dielectric permittivity. This is also reflected in the liquid's conductivity. Less polar liquids are typically less conductive. For instance, the conductivity of semi-polar pure ethanol is about 10^{−4} S/m. It is less conductive than aqueous solution but still is rather high because ionization of polar and semi-polar liquids is the same as in the aqueous solutions, the nature of ions and their solvating layers is the same as in water. In contrast, the conductivity of low- and non-polar liquids is orders of magnitude smaller than in aqueous solutions. For instance, the conductivity of non-polar toluene is around 10^{−10} S/m.

There are 3 factors that account for this difference:

Factor 1 – Solubility. Simple electrolytes (like inorganic salts) that are used as electrolytes in aqueous solutions are not soluble in "low- and non-polar liquids". A substance should possess hydrophobic tail in order to be soluble in such liquids, in addition to having a polar head that ensures dissociation. The use of such "amphiphilic substances" for ionization of non-polar liquids was systematically introduced by Fuoss and Kraus in series of papers published in the middle of the 20th century. There are more recent published confirmations of this fact.

Factor 2 – Solvation. All ions in liquid solutions are covered with "solvation layers", which sterically stabilize cations and anions against re-aggregation into neutral entities. In an aqueous solution the polar water molecules with their large dipole moments build up these layers. The molecules of low- and non-polar liquids do not possess large dipole moments, which limits their interaction with the charged ion core. Instead, the neutral molecules of the added amphiphilic substance fill the role of solvating agent building layers around the charged core. This concept was formulated by Morrison who stated that ions formed by amphiphilic substances in low- and non-polar liquids are called "inverse micelles".

Factor 3 – Ion-pairs. The low dielectric constant of non-polar liquids leads to a much stronger attraction between cations and anions in solution. Some of these ions will come together and form a neutral entity called an "ion-pair". This notion of ion-pair was introduced into electrochemistry in 1929 by Niels Bjerrum. Ion-pairs differ from neutral molecules because, in the case of ion-pairs, the solvating layers are incorporated into them. Ion-pairs restrict conductivity of non-polar liquids, similarly to ion-clouds (proposed by Peter Debye) in aqueous solutions. An ion pair is stable if the distance between ion cores is comparable to the Bjerrum distance λ

$$\lambda = \frac{{e^2}{z^2}}{{4\varepsilon}{\varepsilon_0}{kT}}$$

where e is elementary charge, k is the Boltzmann constant, T is temperature. In water the Bjerrum distance is only 0.71 nm, whereas in toluene (with dielectric constant of 2.36) it is nearly 21 nm. This difference reflects the much stronger electrostatic attraction between ions in non-polar liquids, which leads to a much higher probability of the formation of ion pairs when compared to water.

== Theory ==
Ions which form into ion-pairs do not contribute to the conductivity of a liquid. This mechanism was incorporated into conductivity theory for low- and non-polar liquids by Lars Onsager and Raymond Fuoss. However, their theory was developed only for small concentrations of additives. It also contained a term for electrophoretic retardation, which is negligible for low conducting liquids due to Debye length being much larger than ion size. A new version of this theory was suggested by Dukhin and Parlia. They derived an expression for conductivity K which takes ion-pairs into account:

$$K = \frac{{e}{F}}{{4\pi}{\eta}{N_a}{d^4}}{EXP{(-\frac{\lambda}{d})}}   [{\sqrt{1+{(EXP{\frac{\lambda}{d}}})*\frac{16}{{3\pi}{N_a}{d^3}{\phi}{C}}}}  -1 ]$$

where d effective hydrodynamic ion size, Na is Avogadro's number, C is the molar concentration of ions in the pure solute liquid in (mol/dm^{3}}, and φ is volume fraction of solute.

This theory was verified for a variety of liquid mixtures with the results published across several journal articles and summarized in the paper. It was also verified and confirmed independently by the group from Carnegie-Mellon University.

The Figure above presents the conductivity for a mixture of toluene and methanol across full composition range. The theory proposed by Andrei Dukhin and Parlia provides good theoretical agreement with experimental data across 7 orders of magnitude.

The Dukhin and Parlia conductivity theory makes some important predictions:

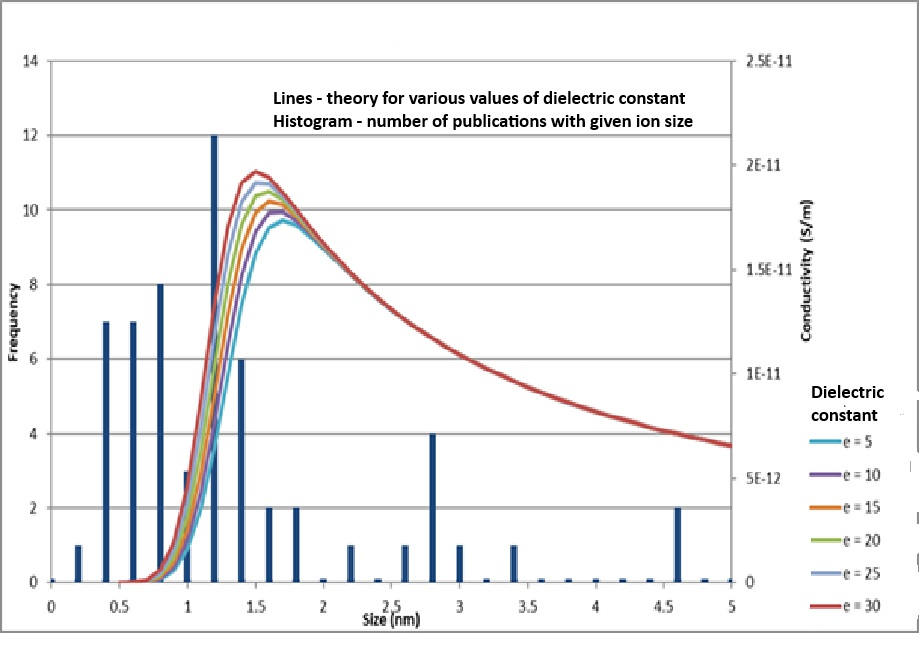
Lines - conductivity multiplied by viscosity versus ion size calculated using theory described here for various values of the liquid dielectric constant. Histogram – is frequency of mentioning particular ion size from literature, 53 data points from 17 published papers.

- Conductivity reaches a maximum at certain value of ion size, as shown in the figure on the right. This "critical ion size" is about 1 nm. Ions of this size produce the highest conductivity for a given solution, which is confirmed with data points from many studies that contain data on ion sizes.
- Ion-pairs appear in low- and non-polar liquids when dielectric permittivity is below 10. This prediction is valid if ionic strength of the liquids is low (<10-6 mol/l). This threshold shifts towards higher dielectric constants with increasing ionic strength.

== Measurement ==
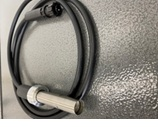
Photo of typical non-aqueous conductivity probe designed as concentric cylinders.

There are several peculiarities of measuring non-aqueous conductivity in low-and non-polar liquids requiring a specially designed instruments to make such measurements.

- The electric current magnitude is smaller by many orders of magnitude compared to aqueous solutions due to very low conductivity. The measurement of such low current requires probes with very high cell constants. This can be achieved by employing a probe designed as concentric cylinders as shown on the image on the right. The sample fills the gap between the internal solid cylinder and the external electrode.
- There is no electrochemical reactions at the electrodes, which eliminates electrodes polarization.
- An electric field must be applied in low frequency AC mode, usually at a few tens of hertz. This prevents the accumulation of ions at one of the electrodes, which would cause concentration polarization and measurement artifacts.
