= Vladimir Gulevich =

Russian biochemist

- Владимир Сергеевич Гулевич
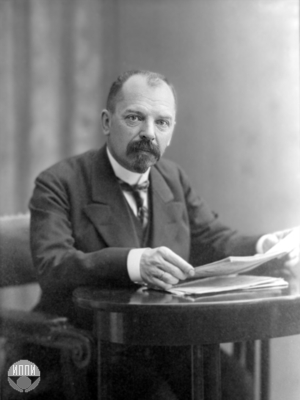
- Vladimir S. Gulevich
- Born: 18 November 1867; Ryazan, Russian Empire
- Died: 6 September 1933 (aged 65); Moscow, Russian SFSR, Soviet Union
- Citizenship: Russian Empire; Soviet Union
- Education: Imperial Moscow University (M.D., 1890)
- Known for: Discovery of carnosine, carnitine and methylguanidine in muscle; work on amino acid and protein chemistry; founding the Moscow school of biochemistry
- Awards: Orders of St Stanislaus (2nd class), St Anna (2nd class), St Vladimir (4th class)
- Scientific career
- Fields: Biochemistry
- Workplaces: University of Kharkiv; Imperial Moscow University; Moscow State University; Higher Women's Courses; Moscow Commercial Institute; All-Union Institute of Experimental Medicine

Vladimir Sergeevich Gulevich (Russian: Владимир Сергеевич Гулевич; 18 November 1867 – 6 September 1933) was a Russian and Soviet biochemist, one of the founders of Russian biochemistry. He spent most of his career at Moscow State University, where he became full professor and head of medical chemistry and served as rector for several months in 1919.

Working with his students and collaborators, Gulevich was the first to isolate the dipeptide carnosine and the compounds carnitine and methylguanidine from mammalian muscle, and he played a major role in the development of medical chemical analysis and biochemical education in Russia.

== Biography ==
=== Family background and early interest in chemistry ===
Gulevich was born in Ryazan into the family of a teacher. His father, Sergei Vikentyevich Gulevich (1843–1901), came from a family of teachers, graduated from the historical and philological faculty of Moscow University in 1866 and made a rapid career in secondary education, eventually becoming director of the 2nd Moscow Gymnasium and receiving hereditary nobility for his service. His mother, Anna Ivanovna (née Pavlinova, 1849–1939), belonged to the nobility.

The 2nd Moscow Gymnasium, which Sergei Gulevich headed for many years, was considered one of the most prestigious in the city; among its pupils were the chemist Ivan Kablukov, geologist Alexei Pavlov, biochemist Alexander Oparin and other future scientists. Both of Vladimir's surviving siblings — he and his younger sister Tatyana (1869–1951) — studied there; Tatyana later worked as a feldsher and pharmacist.

According to his autobiographical notes, from the sixth class of the gymnasium Gulevich "showed a particular inclination for chemistry" and set up a small home laboratory, where he performed simple experiments using popular chemistry books as a guide. This early fascination determined his choice of university studies.

=== Education and doctoral research ===
In 1885 Gulevich entered the medical faculty of the Imperial Moscow University, which he graduated from in 1890 with distinction as a physician. While formally a medical student, he specialised in chemistry, first working in the laboratory of Aleksandr P. Sabaneev at the faculty of physics and mathematics, where he completed courses in qualitative and quantitative analysis, and then in the laboratory of Aleksandr D. Bulyginsky at the Department of Medical Chemistry, where he studied organic and biological chemistry.

In his fifth year he wrote an essay on "The origin, development and role of giant cells in pathological processes" under the supervision of pathologist Vasily Shervinsky; this work was awarded the university gold medal. After graduation he was retained at the Department of Medical Chemistry to prepare for a professorial career and from February 1891 worked there as an extra-staff laboratory assistant.

Supported by a ministry stipend, Gulevich carried out research on choline and neurine in brain tissue. His doctoral thesis, On choline and neurine. Materials for the chemical study of the brain (defended in April 1896), combined an exhaustive critical review of the literature with detailed experimental work. He showed that neurine was absent from the brain under normal conditions and concluded that the then popular theory attributing certain mental illnesses to self-poisoning of the brain by neurine was unfounded.

=== Overseas training and work with Albrecht Kossel ===
In early 1898 Gulevich was sent abroad on a two-year study trip funded by the Ministry of Education. On his way to Germany, he briefly visited Warsaw, Vienna, and Prague to inspect university laboratories and observe local teaching practices. He later wrote that, compared with Moscow, medical chemistry in many European universities was taught with fewer lecture hours and without obligatory laboratory work, which in his view hindered effective training.

The main goal of his trip was to work in the laboratory of Albrecht Kossel at the Physiological Institute of the University of Marburg. Kossel was then a leading authority on nucleic acids and proteins, and under his supervision Gulevich developed improved methods for isolating and purifying arginine, including preparation of new silver salts and determination of their optical rotation, and identified thymine among the products of protein and nuclein hydrolysis using both chemical and crystallographic analysis. He also studied the action of trypsin on organic substances in an attempt to clarify which types of bonds in proteins are most susceptible to enzymatic cleavage.

While in Marburg, Gulevich attended Kossel’s lectures and observed student practicals. He later criticised the very limited laboratory time and lack of prior training in basic qualitative analysis among German medical students, and this experience reinforced his conviction that biochemistry teaching should be built upon a solid foundation of general and analytical chemistry.

Between 1898 and 1900, during and immediately after his stay abroad, Gulevich published sixteen research papers and a book, most of them in German journals such as Zeitschrift für physiologische Chemie, edited by Kossel.

=== Kharkiv professorship and the discovery of carnosine ===
From July 1899 to December 1900 Gulevich was extraordinary professor of medical chemistry and physics at the medical faculty of the University of Kharkiv. On arrival he found the laboratory poorly equipped and set about reorganising and refitting it, while at the same time lecturing and supervising students.

In Kharkiv Gulevich began a new line of research on the so-called extractive substances of skeletal muscle. Building on earlier work on meat extracts by Justus von Liebig and others, he reasoned that the nitrogen content of known muscle constituents did not account for the total nitrogen in extracts and that new nitrogen-rich compounds likely remained undiscovered. Using a method of precipitation with phosphotungstic acid followed by treatment with silver nitrate, he and his student Semen Amiradjibi isolated in 1900 a new strongly basic substance of composition C_{9}H_{14}N_{4}O_{3}, which they named carnosine.

Subsequent work showed that carnosine is a dipeptide, β-alanyl-L-histidine, and that it is characteristic of striated muscle: it is abundant in skeletal muscle but essentially absent from liver, kidney, spleen, blood, lung and other tissues. This first natural β-amino acid derivative attracted considerable interest and marked the beginning of systematic studies of muscle extractives in Gulevich’s laboratory.

=== Return to Moscow and later career ===
In December 1900 Gulevich was elected to the chair of medical chemistry at the Imperial Moscow University. In 1901 he returned there as extraordinary professor and in 1904 was promoted to full professor; after the death of Bulyginsky in 1907 he became head of the Department of Medical Chemistry.

Over the next few years he expanded and modernised the departmental laboratory, making it one of the best-equipped biochemical laboratories in Russia. Between 1904 and 1907 nine of his papers, most of them published in Zeitschrift für physiologische Chemie, reported the discovery of two further nitrogenous compounds from muscle: carnitine (1905, with R. P. Krimberg) and methylguanidine (1906). These studies, carried out together with his students, laid the foundations for the chemical and comparative biochemistry of muscle.

In addition to his work at Moscow University, Gulevich taught biological chemistry at the Higher Women's Courses in Moscow (1908–1918), where he organised a biochemical laboratory and practical classes, and organic chemistry at the Moscow Commercial Institute (from 1910), where he headed the Department of Organic Chemistry and a laboratory oriented towards industrial and technical applications.

Within the university he also held a number of administrative posts: he was vice-rector (1906–1908), dean of the medical faculty (1918) and acting rector from January to March 1919, during a politically turbulent period in the history of the institution.

From the 1920s he worked in the laboratory of physiology and biochemistry of animals at the All-Union Institute of Experimental Medicine, and shortly before his death he became head of its biochemistry section.

Gulevich died in Moscow on 6 September 1933 from a rapidly progressing malignant tumour and was buried at Novodevichy Cemetery.

== Scientific work ==
Gulevich’s research covered several interrelated areas: nitrogen metabolism, the chemistry of amino acids and proteins, and the biochemistry of muscle tissue. A recurring theme was the chemical characterisation of low-molecular-weight "extractive" substances present in small amounts but with important physiological roles.

=== Muscle extractives and dipeptides ===
Beginning with his work in Kharkiv and continuing in Moscow, Gulevich and his collaborators systematically investigated the extractive substances of muscle. After the discovery of carnosine in 1900, they identified carnitine (vitamin B_{11}) in 1905 and methylguanidine in 1906, determined their structures, distribution in different muscles and species, and conditions of enzymatic breakdown.

His laboratory also became a centre for comparative biochemistry. Students and co-workers examined the presence or absence of carnosine and carnitine in the muscles of various animals, demonstrating, for example, their occurrence in the muscles of cattle, horses and sheep and their absence from a number of non-muscular tissues. In 1928 N. F. Tolkachevskaya, working under Gulevich’s supervision, isolated from poultry muscle a related dipeptide, anserine, which together with carnosine became the subject of later physiological studies.

These investigations helped to establish the roles of carnosine, carnitine and related compounds in muscle energy metabolism and acid–base regulation and influenced subsequent work in muscle biochemistry.

=== Amino acids, proteins and methods ===
Beyond muscle extractives, Gulevich worked on the synthesis and properties of amino acids and proteins. He proposed a method for synthesising amino acids by electrochemical reduction of esters and studied degradation pathways and structural features of amino acids and protein hydrolysates.

A strong methodological orientation ran through his work. Gulevich argued that progress in biological chemistry depended critically on the development and adoption of precise experimental methods — not only strictly chemical but also crystallographic and physico-chemical. He believed that many earlier results obtained with crude techniques were unreliable and that new methods would make it possible to isolate and characterise individual compounds from previously amorphous groups of "extractive substances".

=== Medical chemical analysis ===
Gulevich is often regarded as the author of the first Russian handbook on medical chemical analysis. His Analysis of urine. A guide for practical work in the laboratory, first published in 1900 in Kharkiv and repeatedly reissued in Moscow throughout the early twentieth century, served for decades as a standard manual for physicians and students learning clinical chemical methods. He also edited a Short course of biological chemistry based on his lectures, prepared by his student I. A. Makeev.

In the 1920s, at the Moscow Institute of National Economy (formerly the Commercial Institute), his laboratory worked on applied chemical problems such as the production of pharmaceutical compounds, including the local anaesthetic holocaine, chlorination and nitration of aromatic compounds for industrial use, utilisation of sugar-industry by-products, hydrolysis of casein for the manufacture of bouillon cubes and the preparation of calcium glycerophosphate.

== Teaching and mentoring ==
Teaching and the organisation of biochemical education were central to Gulevich’s career. Drawing on both Russian and foreign experience, he insisted that biochemical training for medical students should be based on a sequential programme: a full course of inorganic chemistry and qualitative and quantitative analysis with laboratory practice, followed by organic chemistry, and only then medical (physiological) chemistry with obligatory practical work.

At the Department of Medical Chemistry in Moscow, he involved not only medical students but also students from the faculty of physics and mathematics in laboratory research; many of them completed their graduation theses under his supervision. Practising physicians also trained in his laboratory, recognising the growing importance of biochemical methods for clinical diagnostics.

At the Higher Women's Courses Gulevich built a strong biochemical school among women students. Several of his female pupils, including Yulia M. Gefter, Nadezhda F. Tolkachevskaya and A. I. Tokareva, later became prominent biochemists, professors and authors of textbooks.

A large group of future biochemists emerged from his Moscow laboratory. Many went on to head departments of biological chemistry at universities and medical institutes throughout the Soviet Union. One of his most notable pupils, Sergey Severin, founded the Department of Animal Biochemistry at the biology faculty of Moscow State University and continued research on carnosine and anserine, developing Gulevich’s ideas about their physiological functions.

For more than twenty years, from 1910, Gulevich chaired the chemical section of the Society of Friends of Natural Science, Anthropology and Ethnography, contributing to the dissemination of chemical and biochemical knowledge beyond the university.

== Selected works ==
- On choline and neurine. Materials for the chemical study of the brain (O kholine i neyrine. Materialy k khimicheskomu issledovaniyu mozga). Moscow, 1896 – doctoral dissertation.
- Crystallographic study of some compounds of choline and neurine (Kristallograficheskoe issledovanie nekotorykh soedineniy kholina i neyrina). Bulletin de la Société des Naturalistes de Moscou. 1899.
- Analysis of urine. A guide for practical work in the laboratory (Analiz mochi. Rukovodstvo pri prakticheskikh zanyatiyakh v laboratorii). Kharkiv, 1900; 2nd ed. Moscow, 1905; 3rd ed. Moscow: Printing House of the Imperial Moscow University, 1910; later editions 1913, 1917, 1924–1925 and 1945.
- Selected works (Izbrannye trudy). Moscow: Publishing House of the Academy of Sciences of the USSR, 1954.

== Honours, memberships and recognition ==
During the imperial period Gulevich received several orders of the Russian Empire, including the Orders of St Stanislaus (2nd class), St Anna (2nd class) and St Vladimir (4th class).

He was active in professional societies, serving as chairman of the chemical section of the Russian Physico-Chemical Society and being elected to the German Chemical Society and the Chemical Society of France. In January 1927 he became a corresponding member of the USSR Academy of Sciences, and on 12 January 1929 he was elected a full member of the Academy.

His candidacy for full membership was strongly supported by Ivan Pavlov, who emphasised in his recommendation that a genuine physiological chemist must first be a competent chemist and only then a physiologist, and that in Russia Gulevich best embodied this combination of skills and experience.

In 1928 Gulevich was elected a member of the German Academy of Natural Scientists Leopoldina.

== Legacy ==
In 1954 a volume of Gulevich’s Selected works was published by the Academy of Sciences of the USSR, accompanied by biographical essays by his students. In 1976 a commemorative plaque with his relief was installed on the building of the former medical chemistry laboratory at 6 Bolshaya Nikitskaya Street in Moscow, where he had worked from 1901 to 1933. The Department of Biochemistry of the First Moscow Medical Institute (now I. M. Sechenov First Moscow State Medical University) was named in his honour.

In 1980 the Academy of Medical Sciences of the USSR established the Vladimir S. Gulevich Prize for outstanding work in biological and medical chemistry.

== Personal life ==
On 16 February 1894 Gulevich married Elizaveta Aleksandrovna Strigaleva (1871–1951), daughter of retired artillery major general A. A. Strigalev. Elizaveta studied painting at the Moscow School of Painting, Sculpture and Architecture, exhibited her works and took an active part in artistic societies, for a time heading the group "Free Creativity" ("Svobodnoe tvorchestvo"). The couple had two children: a son, Sergei (1895–1915), and a daughter, Maria (1903–1993).

Sergei Gulevich studied at the Imperial Moscow Technical School and worked in the Aerodynamic Laboratory of Nikolay Zhukovsky. After the outbreak of the First World War he trained as a military pilot and died in 1915 while test-flying a new aeroplane near Moscow.
