= (R)-amidase =

Class of enzymes

Identifiers
- EC no.: 3.5.1.100

Databases
- BRENDA: enzyme data
- ExPASy: NiceZyme view
- KEGG: enzyme entry
- MetaCyc: metabolic pathway
- Rhea: reactions
- PDB structures: RCSB PDB PDBe PDBsum
Search
- PMC: articles
- PubMed: articles
- NCBI: proteins

(R)-amidase (EC 3.5.1.100, R-stereospecific amidase, R-amidase) is an enzyme with systematic name (R)-piperazine-2-carboxamide amidohydrolase. The enzyme characterised from Pseudomonas species catalyses several related hydrolysis reactions.

For example, it converts β-alaninamide to β-alanine:

β-alaninamide
H_{2}O
NH_{3}
β-alanine

It also acts on (R)-piperazine-2-carboxamide:

(R)-piperazine-2-carboxamide
H_{2}O
NH_{3}
(R)-piperazine-2-carboxylic acid

Other substrates include (R)-N-tert-butylpiperazine-2-carboxamide and (R)-piperidine-3-carboxamide. Similar amidases from other organisms are known, including one dependent on cobalt for activity. Immobilized enzyme has been used to produce single-enantiomer piperazine-2-carboxylic acid from the racemic amide.
