= Methionyl-tyrosine =

Names
- IUPAC name (2S)-2-[[(2S)-2-amino-4-methylsulfanylbutanoyl]amino]-3-(4-hydroxyphenyl)propanoic acid
- Other names L-Methionyl-L-tyrosine

Identifiers
CAS Number	13589-04-3
3D model (JSmol)	Interactive image
Abbreviations	met-tyr
ChEBI	CHEBI:73615
ChemSpider	5373137
PubChem CID	7009558
CompTox Dashboard (EPA)	DTXSID10874592
- InChI: Key: PESQCPHRXOFIPX-RYUDHWBXSA-N
- SMILES: CSCC[C@@H](C(=O)N[C@@H](CC1=CC=C(C=C1)O)C(=O)O)N

Properties
Chemical formula	C_{14}H_{20}N_{2}O_{4}S
Molar mass	312.38 g·mol^{−1}
- Except where otherwise noted, data are given for materials in their standard state (at 25 °C [77 °F], 100 kPa). Infobox references

Methionyl-tyrosine is a dipeptide consisting of the amino acids methionine and tyrosine. Methionyl-tyrosine has been detected, but not quantified in, a few different foods, such as birds in the anatidae family, chickens (Gallus gallus), and domestic pigs (Sus scrofa domestica). It is expected to form during digestion of protein.

A crystalline monohydrate is known. In a water solution and solid form, it exists as a zwitterion where one proton is transferred from the -OH group to the -NH_{2}, yielding -O^{−} and -NH_{3}^{+}.
