= Carnosine synthase =

Class of enzymes

carnosine synthase

Identifiers
- EC no.: 6.3.2.11
- CAS no.: 9023-61-4

Databases
- IntEnz: IntEnz view
- BRENDA: BRENDA entry
- ExPASy: NiceZyme view
- KEGG: KEGG entry
- MetaCyc: metabolic pathway
- PRIAM: profile
- PDB structures: RCSB PDB PDBe PDBsum
- Gene Ontology: AmiGO / QuickGO
Search
- PMC: articles
- PubMed: articles
- NCBI: proteins

Carnosine synthase (EC 6.3.2.11) is an enzyme that catalyzes the chemical reaction

ATP + L-histidine + beta-alanine $\rightleftharpoons$ ADP + phosphate + carnosine

The 3 substrates of this enzyme are ATP, L-histidine, and beta-alanine, whereas its 3 products are ADP (previously thought to form AMP), phosphate, and carnosine.

This enzyme belongs to the family of ligases, specifically those forming carbon-nitrogen bonds as acid-D-amino-acid ligases (peptide synthases). The systematic name of this enzyme class is 'L-histidine:beta-alanine ligase (AMP-forming)' (incorrect on AMP-forming). Other names in common use include 'carnosine synthetase', 'carnosine-anserine synthetase', 'homocarnosine synthetase', and 'carnosine-homocarnosine synthetase'.

== Gene ==
The gene encoding this enzyme has been identified by Jakub Drozak and coworkers in 2010. The gene encoding the Carnosine synthase is ATPGD1, a member of the “ATP-grasp family” of ligases. Because of its involvement in the formation of carnosine, this gene is now also named 'CARNS1'.
