= Glycylmethionine =

Names
- IUPAC name (2S)-2-[(2-Aminoacetyl)amino]-4-methylsulfanylbutanoic acid
- Other names L-Glycyl-L-methionine

Identifiers
CAS Number	554-94-9
3D model (JSmol)	Interactive image
Abbreviations	gly-met
ChEBI	CHEBI:74120; zwitterion: CHEBI:74393
ChEMBL	ChEMBL330552
ChemSpider	133336
ECHA InfoCard	100.008.252
EC Number	209-076-1
PubChem CID	151282
UNII	0H4L5K3198
- InChI: Key: PFMUCCYYAAFKTH-YFKPBYRVSA-N
- SMILES: CSCCC(C(=O)O)NC(=O)CN

Properties
Chemical formula	C_{7}H_{14}N_{2}O_{3}S
Molar mass	206.26 g·mol^{−1}
- Except where otherwise noted, data are given for materials in their standard state (at 25 °C [77 °F], 100 kPa). Infobox references

Glycyl-methionine or Gly-Met is a dipeptide consisting of the amino acids glycine and methionine. It plays a role as a metabolite. It is reverse of methionylglycine or Met-Gly sequence.

== Oxidation ==
The oxidation of Gly-Met and its reverse sequence, Met-Gly, has differences. Both photooxidation and collision-induced dissociation of Gly-Met happen through electron transfer from either the sulfur atom or the terminal amino group when it is in its uncharged state. This process leads to the formation of α-protons and sulfur-centered cation radicals in Gly-Met.

However, the photooxidation of Met-Gly behaves differently from Gly-Met. The peptide’s conformation plays a crucial role in understanding the oxidation mechanism. In Met-Gly, the process leads to the formation of an open-chain sulfur-centered cation radical. This radical then releases a proton from the N-terminal amino group, resulting in a five-membered cyclic radical structure with a three-electron bond between the sulfur and nitrogen atoms.

Peptides can adopt different conformations—cationic, zwitterionic, or anionic—depending on the solvent and pH. The zwitterionic form of Gly-Met is particularly important as it is responsible for the formation of sulfur-centered radicals. This same mechanism can cause similar damage in proteins.
