= X-Trp aminopeptidase =

Class of enzymes

Xaa-Trp aminopeptidase

Identifiers
- EC no.: 3.4.11.16
- CAS no.: 137010-33-4

Databases
- IntEnz: IntEnz view
- BRENDA: BRENDA entry
- ExPASy: NiceZyme view
- KEGG: KEGG entry
- MetaCyc: metabolic pathway
- PRIAM: profile
- PDB structures: RCSB PDB PDBe PDBsum
Search
- PMC: articles
- PubMed: articles
- NCBI: proteins

Xaa-Trp aminopeptidase (EC 3.4.11.16, aminopeptidase W, aminopeptidase X-Trp) is an enzyme. This enzyme catalyses the following chemical reaction

Release of a variety of N-terminal residues (especially glutamate and leucine) from peptides, provided tryptophan (or at least phenylalanine or tyrosine) is the penultimate residue. Also acts on Glu!Trp, Leu!Trp and a number of other dipeptides

This glycoprotein contains Zn^{2+}.
