= Non-stereospecific dipeptidase =

Identifiers
- EC no.: 3.4.13.17
- CAS no.: 90371-43-0

Databases
- IntEnz: IntEnz view
- BRENDA: BRENDA entry
- ExPASy: NiceZyme view
- KEGG: KEGG entry
- MetaCyc: metabolic pathway
- PRIAM: profile
- PDB structures: RCSB PDB PDBe PDBsum
Search
- PMC: articles
- PubMed: articles
- NCBI: proteins

Non-stereospecific dipeptidase (EC 3.4.13.17, peptidyl-D-amino acid hydrolase, D-(or L-)aminoacyl-dipeptidase) is an enzyme. This enzyme catalyses the following chemical reaction

Hydrolysis of dipeptides containing either D- or L-amino acids or both

This is a digestive enzyme of cephalopods.
