= Glu-Glu dipeptidase =

Identifiers
- EC no.: 3.4.13.7
- CAS no.: 37288-73-6

Databases
- IntEnz: IntEnz view
- BRENDA: BRENDA entry
- ExPASy: NiceZyme view
- KEGG: KEGG entry
- MetaCyc: metabolic pathway
- PRIAM: profile
- PDB structures: RCSB PDB PDBe PDBsum
Search
- PMC: articles
- PubMed: articles
- NCBI: proteins

Glu-Glu dipeptidase (EC 3.4.13.7, alpha-glutamyl-glutamate dipeptidase, glutamylglutamic arylamidase) is an enzyme. This enzyme catalyses the following chemical reaction

Hydrolysis of the Glu!Glu dipeptide
