= C11H16N4O4 =

The molecular formula C_{11}H_{16}N_{4}O_{4} (molar mass: 268.27 g/mol, exact mass: 268.1172 u) may refer to:

- Acetylcarnosine (NAC)
- Dexrazoxane
- Pentostatin
