= N-acetyl-beta-alanine deacetylase =

Class of enzyme

Identifiers
- EC no.: 3.5.1.21
- CAS no.: 37289-04-6

Databases
- BRENDA: enzyme data
- ExPASy: NiceZyme view
- KEGG: enzyme entry
- MetaCyc: metabolic pathway
- Rhea: reactions
- PDB structures: RCSB PDB PDBe PDBsum
- Gene Ontology: AmiGO / QuickGO
Search
- PMC: articles
- PubMed: articles
- NCBI: proteins

N-acetyl-beta-alanine deacetylase (EC 3.5.1.21) is an enzyme that catalyzes the chemical reaction

N-acetyl-β-alanine
H_{2}O
β-alanine
+
acetic acid

The enzyme characterised from mammalian kidney hydrolyses N-acetyl-β-alanine to β-alanine and acetic acid.

This enzyme is a hydrolase, one acting on carbon-nitrogen bonds other than peptide bonds, specifically in linear amides. The systematic name of this enzyme class is N-acetyl-beta-alanine amidohydrolase.
