= Beta-alanyl-CoA ammonia-lyase =

β-alanyl-CoA ammonia-lyase

Identifiers
- EC no.: 4.3.1.6
- CAS no.: 9024-29-7

Databases
- IntEnz: IntEnz view
- BRENDA: BRENDA entry
- ExPASy: NiceZyme view
- KEGG: KEGG entry
- MetaCyc: metabolic pathway
- PRIAM: profile
- PDB structures: RCSB PDB PDBe PDBsum
- Gene Ontology: AmiGO / QuickGO
Search
- PMC: articles
- PubMed: articles
- NCBI: proteins

The enzyme β-Alanyl-CoA ammonia-lyase (EC 4.3.1.6) catalyzes the chemical reaction

β-alanyl-CoA $\rightleftharpoons$ acryloyl-CoA + NH_{3}

This enzyme belongs to the family of lyases, specifically ammonia lyases, which cleave carbon-nitrogen bonds. The systematic name of this enzyme class is β-alanyl-CoA ammonia-lyase (acryloyl-CoA-forming). This enzyme is also called β-alanyl coenzyme A ammonia-lyase. This enzyme participates in β-alanine metabolism and propanoate metabolism.
