= Acetylenecarboxylate hydratase =

Class of enzymes

acetylenecarboxylate hydratase producing 3-oxopropanoate

Identifiers
- EC no.: 4.2.1.27
- CAS no.: 9024-26-4

Databases
- IntEnz: IntEnz view
- BRENDA: BRENDA entry
- ExPASy: NiceZyme view
- KEGG: KEGG entry
- MetaCyc: metabolic pathway
- PRIAM: profile
- PDB structures: RCSB PDB PDBe PDBsum
- Gene Ontology: AmiGO / QuickGO
Search
- PMC: articles
- PubMed: articles
- NCBI: proteins

The enzyme acetylenecarboxylate hydratase (EC 4.2.1.27) catalyzes the chemical reaction

3-oxopropanoate $\rightleftharpoons$ propynoate + H_{2}O

This enzyme belongs to the family of lyases, specifically the hydro-lyases, which cleave carbon-oxygen bonds. The systematic name of this enzyme class is 3-oxopropanoate hydro-lyase (propynoate-forming). Other names in common use include acetylenemonocarboxylate hydratase, alkynoate hydratase, acetylenemonocarboxylate hydrase, acetylenemonocarboxylic acid hydrase, malonate-semialdehyde dehydratase, and 3-oxopropanoate hydro-lyase. This enzyme participates in 3 metabolic pathways: beta-alanine metabolism, propanoate metabolism, and butanoate metabolism.
