= X-Arg dipeptidase =

Xaa-Arg dipeptidase

Identifiers
- EC no.: 3.4.13.4
- CAS no.: 37288-72-5

Databases
- IntEnz: IntEnz view
- BRENDA: BRENDA entry
- ExPASy: NiceZyme view
- KEGG: KEGG entry
- MetaCyc: metabolic pathway
- PRIAM: profile
- PDB structures: RCSB PDB PDBe PDBsum
Search
- PMC: articles
- PubMed: articles
- NCBI: proteins

Xaa-Arg dipeptidase (EC 3.4.13.4, aminoacyl-lysine dipeptidase, N2-(4-amino-butyryl)-L-lysine hydrolase, X-Arg dipeptidase) is an enzyme. This enzyme catalyses the following chemical reaction

Preferential hydrolysis of Xaa!Arg, Xaa!Lys or Xaa!ornithine dipeptides

This enzyme is widely distributed in mammals.
