= Hell's itch =

- Other names: Suicide itch
- Specialty: Dermatology (Sunburn)
- Symptoms: Abnormal itching sensation, pain, paresthesia, suicidal ideation
- Usual onset: 24–72 hours after initial exposure
- Duration: ~48 hours
- Causes: Sunburn, ultraviolet light, subsequent exposure to water, and topical medications on affected skin
- Treatment: β-Alanine supplements Ibuprofen; Diphenhydramine

Hell's itch, also known as suicide itch, is a rare and intense itching sensation which onsets following a moderate to severe sunburn. A dermatologic reaction, Hell's itch is frequently described as inciting extreme pain, paresthesia, mental distress, and occasionally, suicidal ideations.

While underreported in mainstream medical contexts, individuals with self-diagnosed Hell's itch claim it to be distinct from a regular sunburn; Hell's itch is triggered by treatments that would otherwise be soothing to a standard sunburn, such as the application of cold compresses or topical creams.

== Cause and development ==
Hell's itch, if present, appears one to three days (24–72 hours) after the first development of a sunburn. Occurrence is rare, only affecting a small percentage of the population; risk factors include being light skinned, or at high elevation. It typically develops on the shoulders, upper back, or both.

The exact cause of Hell's itch is unknown, but it is thought to occur through nerve damage from intense ultraviolet light exposure. Additionally, it has a higher tendency to develop in individuals with more severe sunburns, such as those at a second-degree level.

== Symptoms ==
Out of a sample pool of 100 self-diagnosed individuals with Hell's itch, the most common self-reported symptoms were itchy skin (98%), pain (90%), difficulty sleeping (87%), paresthesia or tingling (77%), suicidal ideation (44%), peeling skin (33%), and numbness (13%).

On a pain scale rating from 1 to 10 (with 10 being the most severe pain), the average "symptom severity rating" among the respondents was a 9.17.

The symptoms of Hell's itch have been compared to relentless and deep-felt fire ant bites and thumbtack pricks.

== Treatment ==
Treatment for Hell's itch is unlike standard sunburn care: rather than focusing on the skin itself, Hell's itch is recommended to be treated internally, through medication. Application of standard sunburn treatments, such as topical medications (including aloe vera), creams or bathing, has been known to greatly worsen symptoms.

Common and popularly suggested remedies include the oral ingestion of β-Alanine supplements, ibuprofen or aspirin (for pain relief), and antihistamines like diphenhydramine (for itch relief). Users on Reddit have also recommended the use of peppermint oil, as the "only effective topical" remedy, to be directly applied to affected skin areas.

Individuals with Hell's itch should avoid scratching affected areas, as this will result in the worsening of symptoms.
