= CNDP1 =

Protein-coding gene in the species Homo sapiens

Available structures
PDB	Ortholog search: PDBe RCSB
PDB	List of PDB id codes 3DLJ

Identifiers
- Aliases: CNDP1, CN1, CPGL2, HsT2308, carnosine dipeptidase 1 (metallopeptidase M20 family), carnosine dipeptidase 1
- External IDs: OMIM: 609064; MGI: 2451097; HomoloGene: 57178; GeneCards: CNDP1; OMA:CNDP1 - orthologs

Gene location (Human)
Chr.	Chromosome 18 (human)
Band	18q22.3	Start	74,534,500 bp
Band	18q22.3	End	74,587,212 bp

Gene location (Mouse)
Chr.	Chromosome 18 (mouse)
Band	18|18 E4	Start	84,628,634 bp
Band	18|18 E4	End	84,668,220 bp
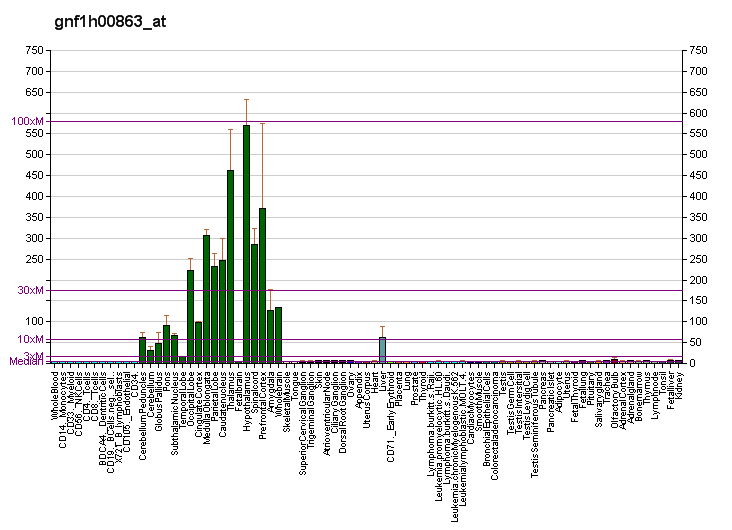
RNA expression pattern
Bgee	Human / Mouse (ortholog); Top expressed in: inferior ganglion of vagus nerve; endothelial cell; C1 segment; medulla oblongata; corpus callosum; pons; superior vestibular nucleus; ventral tegmental area; subthalamic nucleus; substantia nigra / Top expressed in: vestibular membrane of cochlear duct; proximal tubule; right kidney; human kidney; primary oocyte; Epithelium of choroid plexus; secondary oocyte; efferent ductule; jejunum; renal pelvis; More reference expression data
BioGPS	More reference expression data
Gene ontology
Molecular function	carboxypeptidase activity; hydrolase activity; peptidase activity; metallopeptidase activity; metal ion binding; dipeptidase activity
Cellular component	extracellular region; cytosol
Biological process	metabolism; proteolysis; regulation of cellular protein metabolic process
Sources:Amigo / QuickGO
Orthologs
Species	Human	Mouse
Entrez	84735	338403
Ensembl	ENSG00000150656	ENSMUSG00000056162
UniProt	Q96KN2	Q8BUG2
RefSeq (mRNA)	NM_032649	NM_177450
RefSeq (protein)	NP_116038	NP_803233
Location (UCSC)	Chr 18: 74.53 – 74.59 Mb	Chr 18: 84.63 – 84.67 Mb
PubMed search
- Wikidata
View/Edit Human	View/Edit Mouse

Beta-Ala-His dipeptidase is an enzyme that in humans is encoded by the CNDP1 gene.

This gene encodes a member of the M20 metalloprotease family. The encoded protein is specifically expressed in the brain, is a homodimeric dipeptidase which was identified as human carnosinase. This gene contains trinucleotide (CTG) repeat length polymorphism in the coding region.

The metabolic disorder Carnosinemia may be caused by mutations in this gene.
