= Ivan Kablukov =

Russian chemist

Ivan Alekseyevich Kablukov
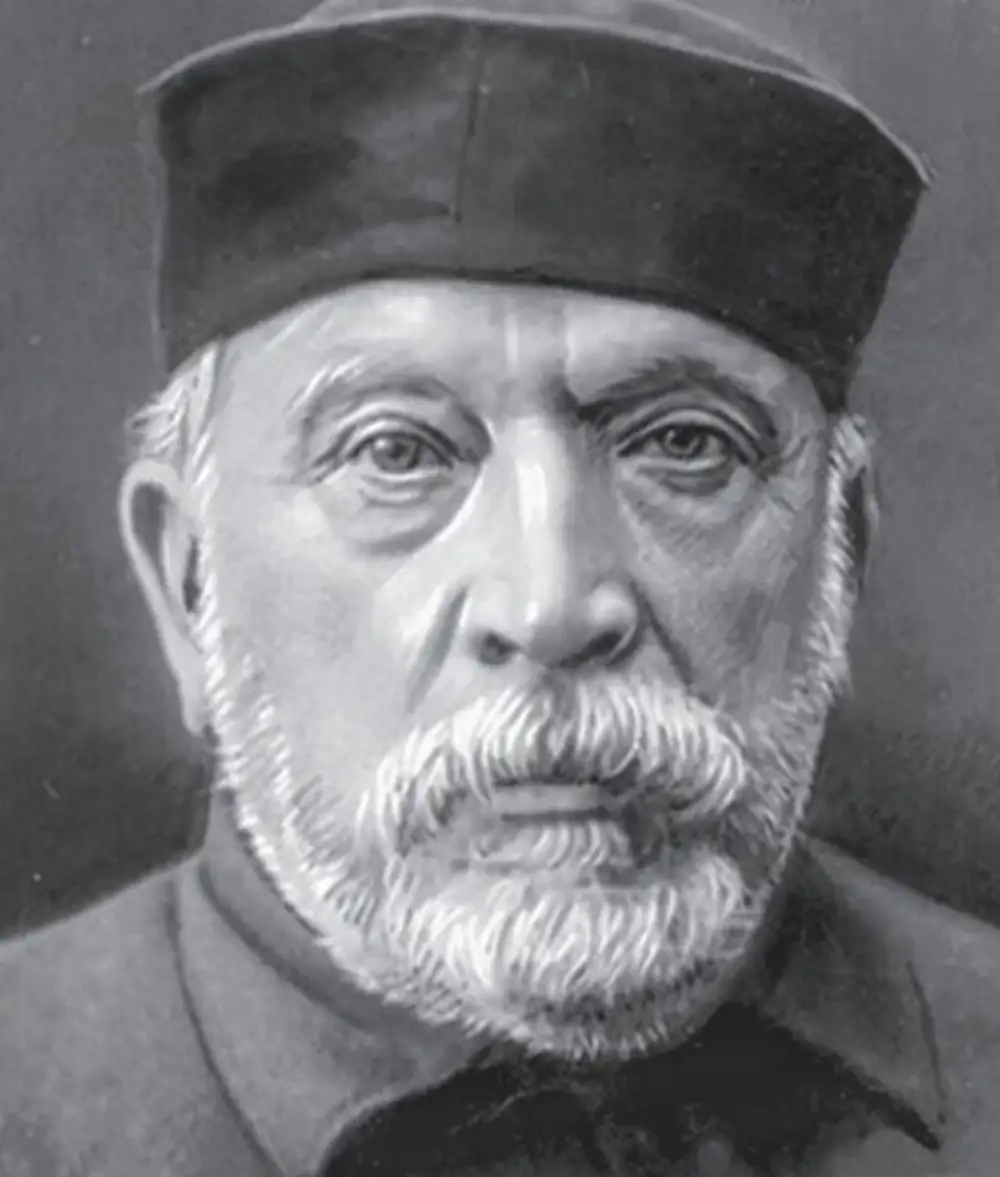
- Born: August 21 (September 2) 1857; Prussy, Moscow Governorate, Russian Empire
- Died: May 5, 1942 (84 years); Tashkent, Uzbek Soviet Socialist Republic, Soviet Union
- Citizenship: Russian Empire, RSFSR, Soviet Union
- Education: Imperial Moscow University
- Known for: one of the discoverers of ion solvation, founder of the physical chemistry school in Russia
- Scientific career
- Fields: physical chemistry
- Workplaces: Imperial Moscow University, Moscow State University
- Doctoral advisor: Vladimir Markovnikov

Ivan Alekseyevich Kablukov (Russian: Ива́н Алексе́евич Каблуко́в, August 21 (2 September) 1857 – 5 May 1942) was a Russian and Soviet physical chemist. He simultaneously and independently of Vladimir Kistiakovsky proposed the idea of ion solvation and initiated the unification of the physical and chemical theory of solutions. He published influential textbooks on organic chemistry and was a professor at Moscow State University and Timiryazev Agricultural Academy.

== Biography ==
Kablukov was born on August 21 (2 September) 1857 in the village of Prussy, Moscow (now Mytishchinsky District, Moscow Oblast), in the family of a dentist. Both his father, Aleksey Kablukov, and his mother, Ekaterina Storozhevaya, came from peasant families.

In 1876 he graduated from the 2nd Moscow Classical Gymnasium. He was a student at the Natural Science Department of the Faculty of Physics and Mathematics at Moscow University (1876-1880), from which he graduated as a candidate. During his studies he was a tutor of the young Vasiliy Maklakov. On the recommendation of Professor Vladimir Markovnikov, Kablukov was appointed to the Department of Chemistry to prepare him for a professorship. During the next years 1881-1882 Kablukov was an employee of the chemical laboratory of Professor of Chemistry Alexander Butlerov in St. Petersburg, and then continued his work at Moscow University with Vladimir Markovnikov.

In November 1884, Kablukov joined the chemical laboratory as a supernumerary assistant. In January 1885, he became a privatdozent at Moscow University, where he delivered the course "On the phenomena of dissociation." During the same period, from 1882 to 1884, he served as a teacher at Higher Courses for Women in Moscow.

In December 1887 he defended his master's thesis "Glycerols, or triatomic alcohols and their derivatives", in which he tried to substantiate Markovnikov's theory of mutual influence of atoms from thermochemical point of view.

In 1889, under the supervision of Professor Svante Arrhenius, he worked at the Leipzig University in the laboratory of Professor Wilhelm Ostwald, where Kablukov studied electrical conductivity of solutions.

In 1897-1906 he taught at the Moscow Engineering School, where he gave practical courses on inorganic and analytical chemistry, as well as on the technology of building materials and iron metallurgy.

In May 1891 he defended his doctoral thesis "Modern theories of solutions (Van-Goff and Arrhenius) in connection with the doctrine of chemical equilibrium" at Moscow University.

In 1899, he was appointed as an associate professor of the Department of Inorganic and Analytical Chemistry at the Moscow Agricultural Institute on the suggestion of academician Nikolay Beketov. He worked there until 1942. Initially, lectures were conducted in the largest auditorium - the assembly hall of the main building. Later on, the department was allocated a separate annex that included a new lecture auditorium and an analytical chemistry hall for 96 students. However, this annex was insufficient to accommodate all the students. On 31 May 1912, Ivan Alekseyevich Kablukov laid the foundation stone of the Chemical Building (now Building No.6), which housed all chemical laboratories and departments. The right wing on the first floor of the building also contained a flat where Ivan Kablukov resided (this room is currently occupied by the Department of Agriculture of Foreign Countries). He gave his first lecture in this building on 22 October 1914. He also began teaching at Timiryazev Agricultural Academy and Real School of K.P. Voskresensky.

From May 1903 he was an extraordinary professor at the Moscow University, where he worked until the end of his life: from 1906 as an ordinary and from January 1910 as an emeritus professor; in 1915-1933 Kablukov was the head of the thermochemical laboratory of the chemistry department of the faculty of physics and mathematics; in 1918 - mid-1920s - head of the laboratory of inorganic and physical chemistry. From 1922 he was also director of the Research Institute of Chemistry at Moscow State University. In December 1916 he was elected to the Moscow City Duma, but the election results were not accepted.

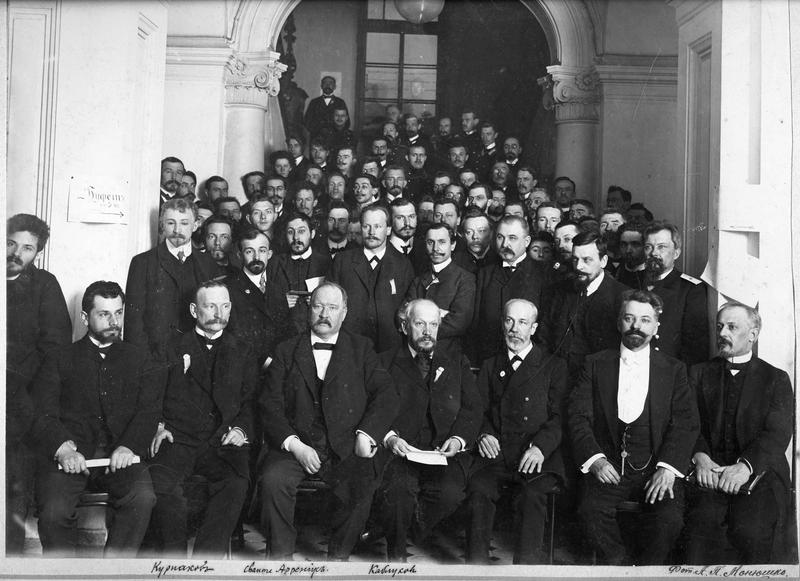
Kablukov (seated in centre with paper on lap) in 1907 at the 1st Mendeleev Congress at the Electrotechnical Institute

Ivan Kablukov was not only engaged in theoretical research, but also studied the natural resources of Russia (later the USSR). He participated in the foundation of the Russian production of mineral fertilizers. In 1905 he was appointed a representative of the Main Department of Land Management and Agriculture to the Interdepartmental Commission on the Production of Nitric Oxide at the Main Artillery Department. In 1908 he was a member of the Moscow Agricultural Institute commission for the Study of phosphorites in Russia, whose work laid the foundations for the production of fertilizers from Russian raw materials. In 1909, at the suggestion of the Ministry of Agriculture, a commission was set up at the Moscow Agricultural Institute on the extraction of nitrogenous fertilizers from the air, the production of lime nitrate and calcium cyanide. The commission was made up of Kablukov, Nikolay Demyanov and Dmitry Pryanishnikov. Two years later, in 1911, Ivan Kablukov became the chairman of the commission on the extraction of lime.

From 1933 to the early 1940s he was also head of the Department of Inorganic and Analytical Chemistry at the Stalin Industrial Academy.

After the October Revolution, in the autumn of 1918 his brother, Nikolai Alekseyevich, was arrested. But thanks to the support of Ivan Kablukov, he was soon released.

After the beginning of the Great Patriotic War, part of the department's staff was evacuated to Chakino (Tambov region) and Samarkand in September 1941. Kablukov died during the evacuation in Tashkent on 5 May 1942.

== Scientific and Teaching Career ==
The main field of scientific interest of academician Ivan Alekseyevich Kablukov was the electrochemistry of non-aqueous solutions.

- In 1889-1891 he studied the electrical conductivity of electrolytes in organic solvents and found an anomalous electrical conductivity of non-aqueous solutions of electrolytes and its increase when water was added to alcohol solutions. Based on these observations, Kablukov assumed a chemical interaction between the solvent and the dissolved substance.
- In 1889-1891, simultaneously and independently of the physicochemist Vladimir Kistiakovsky, he introduced the idea of ionic solvation into the scientific circulation. These works on the electrochemistry of non-aqueous solutions became the subject of his doctoral thesis "Modern theories of solutions (Vant-Goff and Arrhenius) in connection with the doctrines of chemical equilibrium" (1891) and initiated the convergence of physical and chemical theories of solutions.
- In the 1890s he carried out a series of thermochemistry studies and, together with the physical chemist Vladimir Luginin, found that the heat of addition of bromine to ethylene hydrocarbons increases with the transition from lower to higher homologues.
- In 1905, he used the method of thermal analysis for the first time to study the mutual exchange of melted salts.
- From the early 1900s until 1934, he was involved in various applications such as beekeeping and fertilizer chemistry. In particular, in the 1900s he developed a method for extracting bromine from the brine of the Saki Lake in Crimea.

Academician Kablukov is also known as a teacher, science populariser and creator of the Russian physical chemistry school. He is also the author of a number of works on the history of chemistry.

- In 1886-1888, he read private lectures on organic chemistry at Moscow State University: "Organic Chemistry (Nitrogenous Aromatic Compounds)", "History and Criticism of the Theory of the Structure of Chemical Compounds" and others.
- In 1886-1906 (according to some information - since 1884) he read courses "On the phenomena of dissociation", "Theoretical chemistry (the beginnings of thermochemistry)", "On chemical affinity and methods of its measurement", "The doctrine of solutions", "The doctrine of elements and stoichiometry of bodies", "Electrochemistry", as well as a general course of physical chemistry.
- In 1888-1889 he read a course on zoochemistry at the Medical Faculty of Moscow University. A systematic course in physical (theoretical) chemistry was first taught by Kablukov.
- In 1895-1899 (until 1898 - together with the organic chemist Michael Konovalov) he gave lectures and practical courses in general chemistry for mathematicians.
- In 1898 he published "The Outline of Some Lectures from the Course of General Chemistry", and in 1900 - the textbook "Fundamental Principles of Inorganic Chemistry", which later went through 13 editions.
- From 1906 he regularly read selected chapters from general (inorganic and physical) chemistry, including electrochemistry, the doctrine of chemical equilibrium and the phase rule. He published one of the first textbooks on the subject, Fundamentals of Physical Chemistry.
- For many years he taught practical courses in qualitative and quantitative analysis and thermochemistry at the Faculty of Physics and Mathematics of Moscow University.
- He also taught courses in general and inorganic chemistry in the late 1920s.

== Publications ==
The scientific legacy of Ivan Kablukov includes more than 300 works. Some publications:

- Основные начала неорганической химии. — M., Инж. уч. вед. пут. сообщ, 1900. — 310 с. (Fundamentals of inorganic chemistry)
- Основные начала физической химии (Fundamentals of physical chemistry):
  - Вып. 1. Основные начала физической химии. — М., Тип. Борисенко и Бреслин, 1900. — 243 с. (Vol. 1. Basic principles of physical chemistry)
  - Вып. 2. Электрохимия. — М., Тип. Борисенко, 1902. — 327 с. (Vol. 2. Electrochemistry)
  - Вып. 3. Термохимия. Учение о химическом сродстве. — M., Тип. Холчева, 1910. — 320 с. (Vol. 3. Thermochemistry. The theory of chemical affinity)
- Очерки из истории электрохимии за XIX век. — M., Тип. Кушнерева, 1901. — 66 с. (Sketches of the history of electrochemistry in the XIX century)
- Физическая и коллоидная химия. — M., Сельхозгиз, 1935. — 558 с. (Physical and colloidal chemistry)
- Правило фаз в применении к насыщенным растворам солей. — Л., ГХТИ, 1933. — 160 с. (The phase rule applied to saturated solutions of salts)

== Memory ==
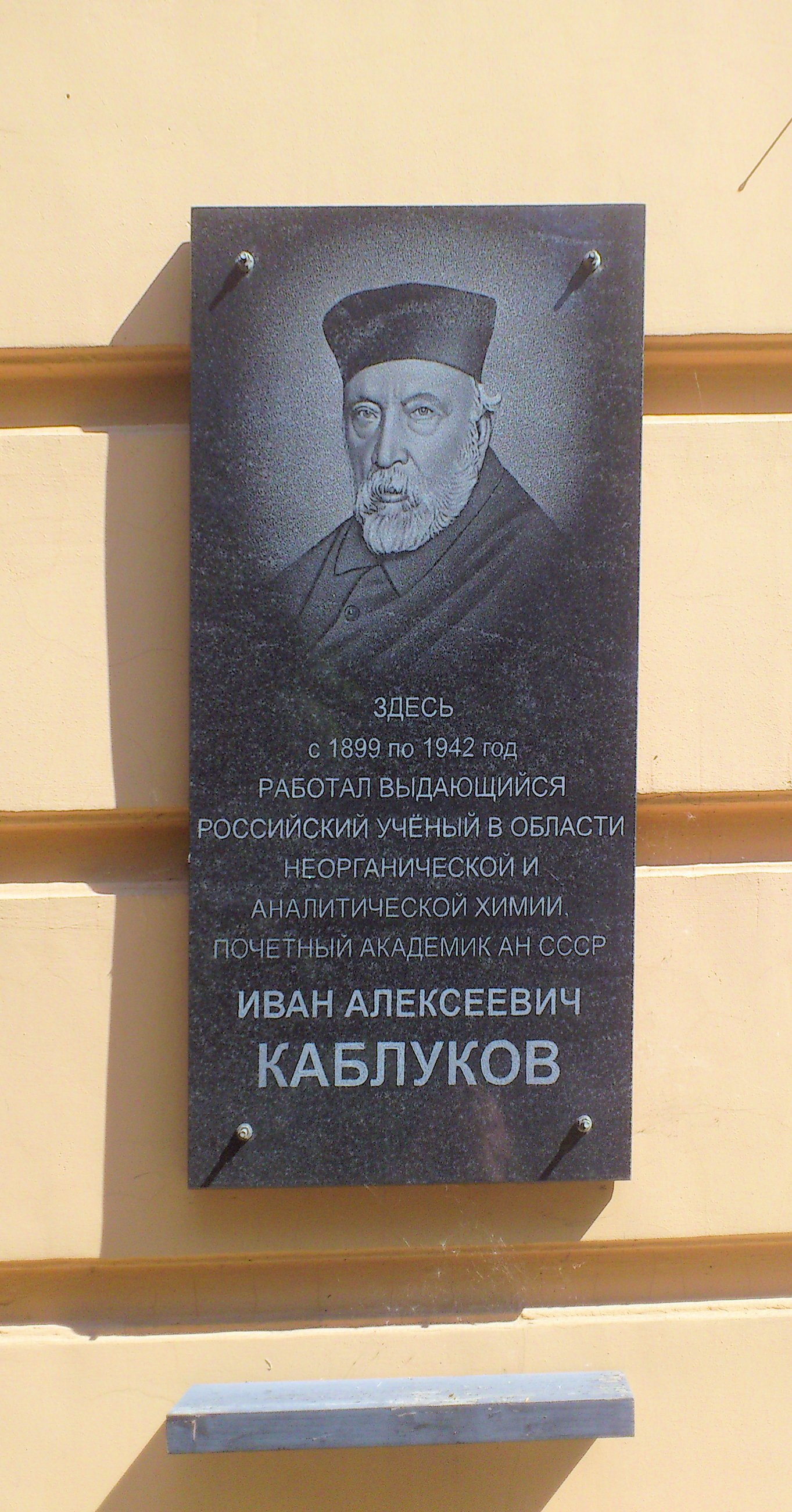
Memorial plaque on the educational building of the Russian State Agrarian University – Moscow Timiryazev Agricultural Academy

A memorial plaque now adorns educational building No. 6 of K. A. Timiryazev Moscow Agricultural Academy (Timiryazevsky proezd, house No. 2) in Moscow, marking the workplace of I. A. Kablukov between 1889 and 1942. Kablukov Street has been present in Kiev since 1957 and was renamed in 2022.

== Awards and titles ==
Honours of the Russian Empire:

- Orders:
  - Saint Vladimir, 4th degree.
  - Saint Anna, 2nd degree.
  - Saint Stanislaus, 2nd degree.
  - Saint Anna, 3rd degree.
  - Saint Stanislaus, 3rd degree.
- Badge in commemoration of the 300th anniversary of the reign of the Romanovs.
- Medal in Commemoration of the Reign of Emperor Alexander III and the Holy Coronation of Their Imperial Majesties in 1896

Soviet state honours and titles:

- Hero of Labour (1924);
- Honoured Worker of Science of the Russian SFSR (1929);
- Order of the Red Banner of Labour (1937);
- Order of Lenin (1940).

Corresponding member of the Academy of Sciences of the Soviet Union (1928); honorary member of the Academy of Sciences of the Soviet Union (1932); honorary member of the Society of Devotees of Natural Science, Anthropology, and Ethnography (since 1921); member of the Russian Physical and Chemical Society, the Society for the Acclimatisation of Animals and Plants (since 1898), the All-Union Chemical Society named after Dmitri Mendeleev (in 1934 he was elected vice-president of the Moscow Branch of the Chemical Society) and many other scientific societies. Honorary Professor of Moscow University (since 1910).

== Family members ==
- Father: Aleksey Fedorovich Kablukov (1814-1882) - manager of Saltykov-Shchedrin's estate in the village of Vitenevo, Moscow region, dentist.
- Mother: Ekaterina Stepanovna Kablukova
- Brother: Nikolai Alekseyevich Kablukov (1849-1919) - Russian economist, zemstvo statistician, doctor of political economy and statistics
- Children: Maria Ivanovna Kablukova (1896-1980), married the famous fruit-growing scientist Venedikt Kolesnikov (1895-1978).
- Grandchildren:
  - Evgeny Venediktovich Kolesnikov (1919-1992) - scientist, doctor of agricultural sciences, author of books on fruit growing.
  - Ekaterina Venediktovna Kolesnikova (1920-2008)

== In art ==
Academician Ivan Kablukov was renowned for his impracticality and absent-mindedness. For instance, he referred to himself as "Kabluk Ivanov" during introductions. Additionally, instead of stating "chemistry and physics", the professor frequently instructed his students in "chemics and physistry". And instead of the phrase "the flask burst and a piece of glass got in the eye", Kablukov would state "the burst flasked and a piece of eye got in the glass". The term "Mendelshutkin" referred to the combination of "Mendeleev" and "Menshutkin", while Ivan Alekseyevich commonly used the phrases "Not at all" and "Me, I mean not me". Poet Samuil Marshak utilized this in his 1930 composition "So absent-minded is he".

The professor was familiar with Marshak's humorous composition, and one day he remonstrated with Marshak's brother, the writer Ilyin, wagging his finger: "Your brother was certainly aiming at me!".

== Literature ==
- Волков В. А., Куликова М. В. (2003). Московские профессора XVIII — начала XX веков: Естественные и технические науки. Деятели науки и просвещения Москвы XVIII—XX веков в портретах и характеристиках (2000 экз ed.). М.: Янус-К; Московские учебники и Картолитография. pp. 108—109. ISBN 5-8037-0164-5 – via Отв. ред. С. С. Илизаров; Институт истории естествознания и техники им. С. И. Вавилова РАН.
- Зефирова О. Н. (2010). "КАБЛУКОВ Иван Алексеевич". Императорский Московский университет: 1755—1917: энциклопедический словарь (2000 экз ed.). М.: Российская политическая энциклопедия (РОССПЭН). pp. 284–285. ISBN 978-5-8243-1429-8 – via составители А. Ю. Андреев, Д. А. Цыганков.
- "Каблуков Иван Алексеевич". Большая советская энциклопедия (3 ed.). М.: Советская энциклопедия. 1969–1978.
- Полищук В. Р. (1983). Теорема Каблукова. Творцы науки и техники (80000 экз ed.). М.: Знание.
- Сабанеев Л. Л. Воспоминания о России. — Москва: Классика-XXI, 2005. — 268 с.
- Соловьев Ю. И., Каблукова М. И., Колесников Е. В. Иван Алексеевич Каблуков: Сто лет со дня рождения. 1857—1957. М.: Издательство АН СССР, 1957. — 211 с.
- Шабаршов И. А. (1981). Ученые пчеловоды России: (Н. М. Витвицкий. А. М. Бутлеров. И. А. Каблуков. Г. А. Кожевников. А. Е. Титов) (70000 экз ed.). М.: Колос. pp. 87–110 – via Рец.: В. А. Губин.
