= Xenortide =

Xenortide A

Xenortide B

Xenortide C

Xenortide D

Chemical structure of xenortides

The xenortides (A-D) are a class of linear peptides isolated from the bacterium Xenorhabdus nematophila, a symbiont of the entomopathogenic nematode Steinernema carpocapsae. This class of compounds is known for their insect virulence and cytotoxic biological activities. The tryptamide containing compounds (xenortides B and D) show higher biological activity than the phenylethylamides (xenortides A and C). The most biologically active compound was found to be xenortide B with a potency of less than 1.6 μM activity against Trypanosoma brucei rhodesiense (sleeping sickness) and Plasmodium falciparum (malaria), however it is also the most toxic to mammalian cells which limits its viability as a treatment.

The biosynthesis of xenortides A-D consists of two non-ribosomal peptide synthases (NRPS) coded by genes XndA and XndB, as well as upstream NADH flavin reductase, and a D-aminopeptidase. The first NRPS (XndA) consists of a condensation, adenylation, methylation, and thiolation domain, and has been implicated for the loading of N-methylleucine (xenortides A-B) or N-methylvaline (xenortides C-D). The second NRPS (XndB) consists of a condensation, adenylation, methylation, thiolation, and terminal condensation domains. XndB has been implicated in elongation with N-methylphenylalanine, as well as the final condensation of the enzyme-bound peptide with either decarboxylated phenylalanine (xenortides A and C) or decarboxylated tryptophan (xenortides B and D), ending the biosynthesis.

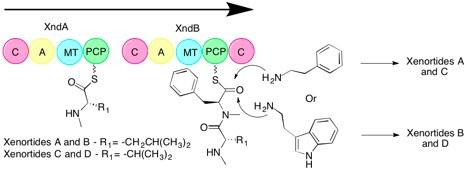
Domain organization of the biosynthetic gene cluster responsible for producing xenortides A-D. C: Condensation domain, A: Adenylation domain, MT: Methyltransferase domain, PCP: Peptidyl carrier protein domain
