= Alanyl-glutamine =

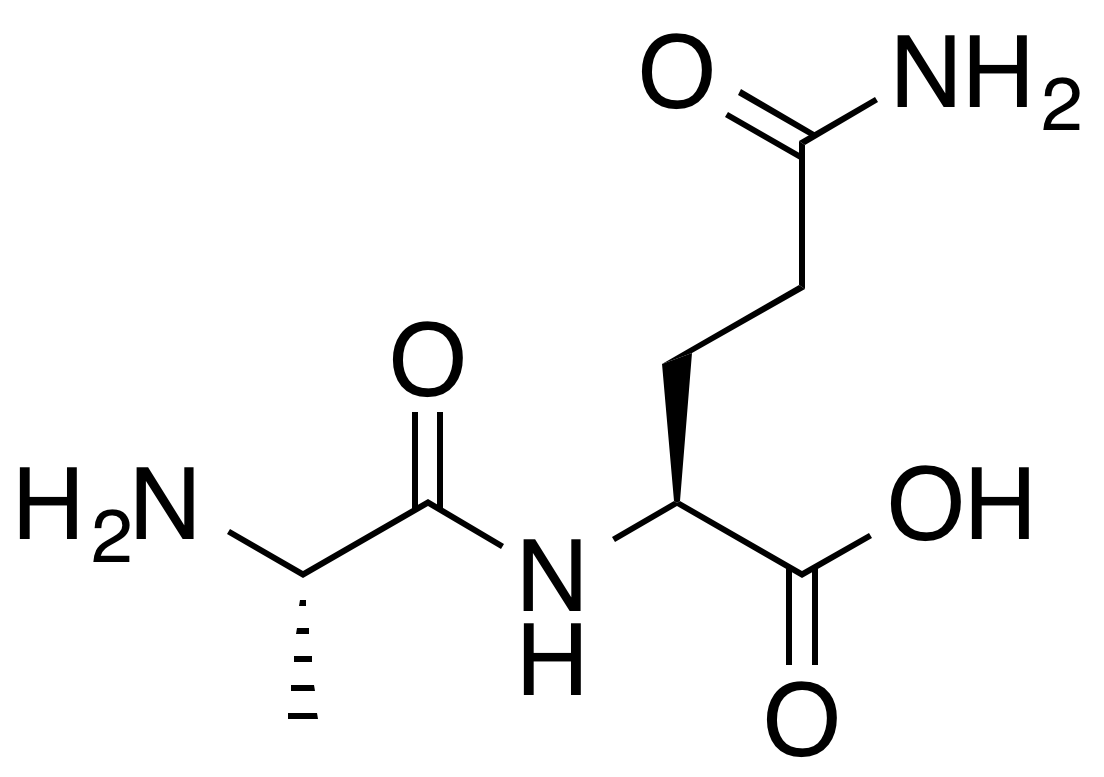

Names
- IUPAC name L-Alanyl-L-glutamine

Identifiers
CAS Number	39537-23-0
3D model (JSmol)	Interactive image; Interactive image
Abbreviations	Ala-Gln
ChEBI	CHEBI:73788
ChEMBL	ChEMBL3707366
ChemSpider	110464
DrugBank	DB11876
ECHA InfoCard	100.129.824
EC Number	609-717-9
KEGG	C20958
PubChem CID	123935
UNII	U5JDO2770Z
CompTox Dashboard (EPA)	DTXSID20192658
- InChI: InChI=1S/C8H15N3O4/c1-4(9)7(13)11-5(8(14)15)2-3-6(10)12/h4-5H,2-3,9H2,1H3,(H2,10,12)(H,11,13)(H,14,15)/t4-,5-/m0/s1
- SMILES: CC(C(=O)NC(CCC(=O)N)C(=O)O)N; C[C@@H](C(=O)N[C@@H](CCC(=O)N)C(=O)O)N

Properties
Chemical formula	C_{8}H_{15}N_{3}O_{4}
Molar mass	217.225 g·mol^{−1}
- Except where otherwise noted, data are given for materials in their standard state (at 25 °C [77 °F], 100 kPa). Infobox references

Alanyl-glutamine is a chemical compound which in the form L-alanyl-L-glutamine is used in dietary supplementation, in parenteral nutrition, and in cell culture. It is a dipeptide consisting of alanine and glutamine.

== Dietary supplement ==
As a dietary supplement, alanyl-glutamine protects the gastrointestinal tract. The protective effect reduces bacterial translocation, thus reducing the risk of infections and infection-related problems such as diarrhea, dehydration, malabsorption, and electrolyte imbalance.

== Parenteral nutrition ==
At room temperature with 1 atmosphere of pressure, L-alanyl-L-glutamine has a solubility of about 586 g/L, which is more than 10 times glutamine's solubility (35 g/L). Also, glutamine does not withstand sterilization procedures, whereas alanyl-glutamine does. Alanyl-glutamine's high solubility makes it valuable in parenteral nutrition.

== Cell culture ==
In cell culture, L-alanyl-L-glutamine is sometimes used as a replacement for L-glutamine because this dipeptide is stable in aqueous solution unlike L-glutamine which spontaneously degrades to form ammonia and pyrrolidone carboxylic acid. During cell culture, L-alanyl-L-glutamine is broken down into L-glutamine which is an essential nutrient for the cells. Because the chemical compound L-alanyl-L-glutamine is broken down a little at a time, the cells have time to use the L-glutamine that is formed before it is broken down into ammonia and pyrrolidone carboxylic acid. Ammonia tends to damage the cells, which means that when growing with a medium that uses L-glutamine instead of L-alanyl-L-glutamine, it is necessary to change the cells' growth medium more often.

L-Alanyl-L-glutamine is sold under the name GlutaMAX by Thermo Fisher Scientific and under the name AminoStable by Ajinomoto.
