= Oglufanide =

Clinical data
- Other names: IM-862; Oglufanide disodium; Thymogen

Identifiers
- IUPAC name: (4S)-4-amino-5-[[(1S)-1-carboxy-2-(1H-indol-3-yl)ethyl]amino]-5-oxopentanoic acid
- CAS Number: 38101-59-6 237068-57-4
- PubChem CID: 100094
- DrugBank: DB05779
- ChemSpider: 90450
- UNII: 4RHY598T5U
- ChEBI: CHEBI:73512
- ChEMBL: ChEMBL2111029
- CompTox Dashboard (EPA): DTXSID10924324

Chemical and physical data
- Formula: C_{16}H_{19}N_{3}O_{5}
- Molar mass: 333.344 g·mol^{−1}
- 3D model (JSmol): Interactive image
- SMILES: C1=CC=C2C(=C1)C(=CN2)C[C@@H](C(=O)O)NC(=O)[C@H](CCC(=O)O)N
- InChI: InChI=1S/C16H19N3O5/c17-11(5-6-14(20)21)15(22)19-13(16(23)24)7-9-8-18-12-4-2-1-3-10(9)12/h1-4,8,11,13,18H,5-7,17H2,(H,19,22)(H,20,21)(H,23,24)/t11-,13-/m0/s1; Key:LLEUXCDZPQOJMY-AAEUAGOBSA-N

Oglufanide (Glu-Trp, thymogen) is a dipeptide having the sequence L-Glu-L-Trp. It is an immunomodulator and has been investigated for the treatment of hepatitis C. It was originally isolated from calf thymus gland extracts and has been used medicinally in Russia as a component of Thymalin, a mixture of thymus derived peptides and small proteins also containing other components such as thymosins and thymulin. Synthetic versions of Glu-Trp containing unnatural D-amino acids or with gamma-peptide bond links also have different immunomodulatory effects such as the immunosuppressor thymodepressin (D-Glu-D-Trp).
