= Met-X dipeptidase =

Met-Xaa dipeptidase

Identifiers
- EC no.: 3.4.13.12
- CAS no.: 37341-91-6

Databases
- IntEnz: IntEnz view
- BRENDA: BRENDA entry
- ExPASy: NiceZyme view
- KEGG: KEGG entry
- MetaCyc: metabolic pathway
- PRIAM: profile
- PDB structures: RCSB PDB PDBe PDBsum
Search
- PMC: articles
- PubMed: articles
- NCBI: proteins

Met-Xaa dipeptidase (EC 3.4.13.12, methionyl dipeptidase, dipeptidase M) is an enzyme. This enzyme catalyses the following chemical reaction

Hydrolysis of Met!Xaa dipeptides

This Mn^{2+}-activated Escherichia coli enzyme with thiol dependence
