= Kyotorphin =

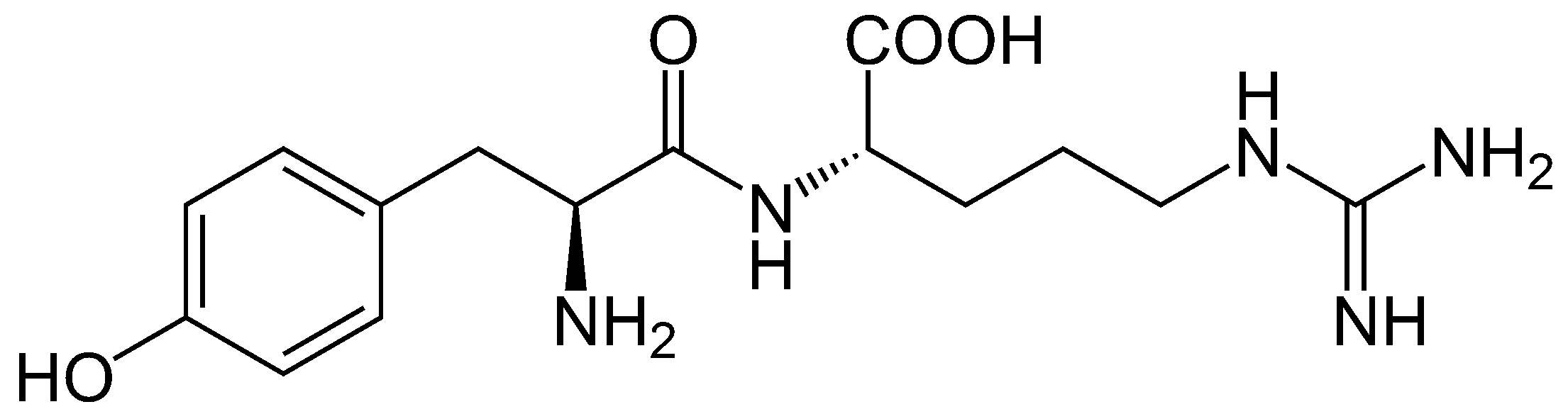
- Chemical structure of kyotorphin

Names
- IUPAC name (2S)-2-{{#parsoidfragment:0}}(2S)-2-Amino-3-(4-hydroxyphenyl)propanoyl]amino]-5- (diaminomethylideneamino)pentanoic acid
- Other names Kiotorphin; L-Tyrosyl-L-arginine

Identifiers
CAS Number	70904-56-2
3D model (JSmol)	Interactive image
ChEBI	CHEBI:17537
ChEMBL	ChEMBL273521
ChemSpider	110353
PubChem CID	123804
UNII	02N30CW3X0
CompTox Dashboard (EPA)	DTXSID40221136
- InChI: InChI=1S/C15H23N5O4/c16-11(8-9-3-5-10(21)6-4-9)13(22)20-12(14(23)24)2-1-7-19-15(17)18/h3-6,11-12,21H,1-2,7-8,16H2,(H,20,22)(H,23,24)(H4,17,18,19)/t11-,12-/m0/s1 Key: JXNRXNCCROJZFB-RYUDHWBXSA-N; InChI=1/C15H23N5O4/c16-11(8-9-3-5-10(21)6-4-9)13(22)20-12(14(23)24)2-1-7-19-15(17)18/h3-6,11-12,21H,1-2,7-8,16H2,(H,20,22)(H,23,24)(H4,17,18,19)/t11-,12-/m0/s1 Key: JXNRXNCCROJZFB-RYUDHWBXBC
- SMILES: O=C(O)[C@@H](NC(=O)[C@@H](N)Cc1ccc(O)cc1)CCC/N=C(\N)N

Properties
Chemical formula	C_{15}H_{23}N_{5}O_{4}
Molar mass	337.380 g·mol^{−1}
- Except where otherwise noted, data are given for materials in their standard state (at 25 °C [77 °F], 100 kPa). verify (what is ?) Infobox references

Kyotorphin (L-tyrosyl-L-arginine) is a neuroactive dipeptide which plays a role in pain regulation in the brain. It was first isolated from bovine brain, by Japanese scientists in 1979. Kyotorphin was named for the site of its discovery, Kyoto, Japan and because of its morphine- (or endorphin-) like analgesic activity. Kyotorphin has an analgesic effect, but it does not interact with the opioid receptors. Instead, it acts by releasing met-enkephalin and stabilizing it from degradation. It may also possess properties of neuromediator/neuromodulator. It has been shown that kyotorphin is present in the human cerebrospinal fluid and that its concentration is lower in patients with persistent pain.
