= Acetylcarnosine =

Names
- IUPAC name (S)-2-(3-Acetamidopropanoylamino)-3-(1H-imidazol-5-yl)propanoic acid
- Other names N-(N-Acetyl-β-alanyl)histidine; N-Acetyl-L-carnosine; N-Acetylcarnosine

Identifiers
CAS Number	56353-15-2
3D model (JSmol)	Interactive image
Abbreviations	NAC
ChemSpider	8079136
ECHA InfoCard	100.054.640
PubChem CID	9903482
UNII	0TPN86OQIF
CompTox Dashboard (EPA)	DTXSID30204897
- InChI: InChI=1S/C11H16N4O4/c1-7(16)13-3-2-10(17)15-9(11(18)19)4-8-5-12-6-14-8/h5-6,9H,2-4H2,1H3,(H,12,14)(H,13,16)(H,15,17)(H,18,19)/t9-/m0/s1 Key: BKAYIFDRRZZKNF-VIFPVBQESA-N; InChI=1/C11H16N4O4/c1-7(16)13-3-2-10(17)15-9(11(18)19)4-8-5-12-6-14-8/h5-6,9H,2-4H2,1H3,(H,12,14)(H,13,16)(H,15,17)(H,18,19)/t9-/m0/s1 Key: BKAYIFDRRZZKNF-VIFPVBQEBE
- SMILES: O=C(NCCC(=O)N[C@H](C(=O)O)Cc1c[nH]cn1)C

Properties
Chemical formula	C_{11}H_{16}N_{4}O_{4}
Molar mass	268.27 g/mol
- Except where otherwise noted, data are given for materials in their standard state (at 25 °C [77 °F], 100 kPa). verify (what is ?) Infobox references

N-Acetylcarnosine or Acetylcarnosine (NAC) (not to be confused with N-Acetylcysteine, which is also abbreviated "NAC") is a naturally occurring compound chemically related to the dipeptide carnosine. The NAC molecular structure is identical to carnosine with the exception that it carries an additional acetyl group. The acetylation makes NAC more resistant to degradation by carnosinase, an enzyme that breaks down carnosine to its constituent amino acids, beta-alanine and histidine.

== Actions ==
Carnosine and metabolic derivatives of carnosine, including NAC, are found in a variety of tissues but particularly muscle tissue. These compounds have varying degrees of activity as free radical scavengers. It has been suggested that NAC is particularly active against lipid peroxidation in the different parts of the lens in the eye. It is an ingredient in eye drops that are marketed as a dietary supplement (not a drug) and have been promoted for the prevention and treatment of cataracts. There is scant evidence on its safety, and no convincing evidence that the compound has any effect on ocular health.

== Research ==
Most of the clinical research on NAC has been conducted by Mark Babizhayev of the US-based company Innovative Vision Products (IVP), which markets NAC treatments.

During early experiments performed at the Moscow Helmholtz Research Institute for Eye Diseases, it was shown that NAC (1% concentration), was able to pass from the cornea to the aqueous humour after about 15 to 30 minutes. In a 2004 trial of 90 canine eyes with cataracts, NAC was reported to have performed better than placebo in positively affecting lens clarity. An early human study NAC reported that NAC was effective in improving vision in cataract patients and reduced the appearance of cataract.

The Babizhayev group later published a placebo-controlled clinical trial of NAC in 76 human eyes with mild to advanced cataracts and reported similar positive results for NAC. However, a 2007 scientific review of the current literature discussed the limitations of the clinical trial, noting that the study had low statistical power, a high dropout rate and "insufficient baseline measurement to compare the effect of NAC", concluding that "a separate larger trial is needed to justify the benefit of long-term NAC therapy".

Babizhayev and colleagues published a further human clinical trial in 2009. They reported positive results for NAC as well as arguing "only certain formulas designed by IVP... are efficacious in the prevention and treatment of senile cataract for long-term use."

== Commentary ==
The Royal College of Ophthalmologists remains very skeptical about claims of efficacy in cataract reversal. It issued the following public statement about NAC in August 2008:

The evidence for the effectiveness of N-acetyl carnosine eye drops is based on experience on a small number of cases carried out by a Russian research team [Babizhayev]. To date, the research has not been corroborated and the results replicated by others. The long-term effect is unknown. Unfortunately, the evidence to date does not support the 'promising potential' of this drug in cataract reversal. More robust data from well conducted clinical trials on adequate sample sizes will be required to support these claims of efficacy. Furthermore, we do not feel the evidence base for the safety is in any way sufficient to recommend its use in the short term. More research is needed.

In a 2010 book on ocular disease, the current state of this subject is summarized as follows:

Carnosine (β-alanyl-L-histidine), and its topical prodrug formulation N-acetylcarnosine (NAC), is advertised (especially on the internet) to treat a range of ophthalmic disorders associated with oxidative stress, including age-related and diabetic cataracts. No convincing animal studies or masked clinical trials have been reported.

A Cochrane review summarizing research up to June 2016 has concluded that there is "no convincing evidence that NAC reverses cataract, nor prevents progression of cataract". The authors did not include the studies conducted by the Babizhayev group because they were unable to establish that the research used scientific methods appropriate for clinical trials.
