= Bergmann azlactone peptide synthesis =

The Bergmann azlactone peptide synthesis is a classic organic synthesis process for the preparation of dipeptides.

In the presence of a base, peptides are formed by aminolysis of N-carboxyanhydrides of amino acids with amino acid esters (1).

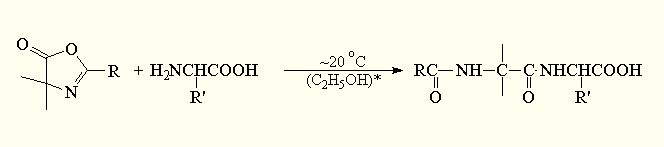
1

This reaction can be looked at in further detail by Bailey.

The resulting peptide is then protected by esters of benzylchroroformate in order to keep the amino groups intact (2).

$$\begin{matrix} {} \\ \ce{{C6H5CH2OCOCl} + H2N\underset{| \atop \displaystyle R}{C}HCOOR' ->[\ce{NaOH}^*;\; 0-20^\circ \ce C][(\ce{H2O})] C6H5CH2OCOH\underset{| \atop \displaystyle R}{C}HCOOR'} \\ {} \\ *\ \ce{{CHCl} + (C2H5)3N, {CH3COOC2H5} + MgO, {CHCl3} + {H2O} + Na2CO3} \end{matrix}$$	2

This mechanism serves as a source of protection for the amino group in the amino acid. The ester will block the amino group from binding with other molecules.

The last step in this reaction is the cyclization of the N-haloacylamino acids with an acetanhydride. This will result in the expected azlactone (3).

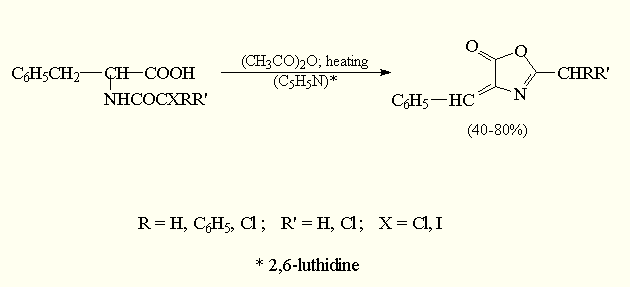
3

The reaction with a second amino acid allows for the ring to open, later forming an acylated unsaturated dipeptide.

The reaction happens in a step-wise function which allows for the amino group to be protected and the azlactone to be produced.

Catalytic hydrogenation and hydrolysis then take place in order to produce the dipeptide (4).
