= Malonate-semialdehyde dehydrogenase =

Identifiers
- EC no.: 1.2.1.15
- CAS no.: 9028-94-8

Databases
- IntEnz: IntEnz view
- BRENDA: BRENDA entry
- ExPASy: NiceZyme view
- KEGG: KEGG entry
- MetaCyc: metabolic pathway
- PRIAM: profile
- PDB structures: RCSB PDB PDBe PDBsum
Search
- PMC: articles
- PubMed: articles
- NCBI: proteins

In enzymology, malonate-semialdehyde dehydrogenase (EC 1.2.1.15) is an enzyme that catalyzes the chemical reaction

3-Oxopropanoic acid
+ NAD^{+}
H_{2}O
H^{+}
H_{2}O
H^{+}
Malonic acid
+ NADH

The three substrates of this enzyme are 3-oxopropanoic acid, reduced nicotinamide adenine dinucleotide (NAD^{+}), and water. Its products are malonic acid, reduced NADH, and a proton. This enzyme can use the alternative cofactor, nicotinamide adenine dinucleotide phosphate.

This enzyme belongs to the family of oxidoreductases, specifically those acting on the aldehyde or oxo group of donor with NAD+ or NADP+ as acceptor. The systematic name of this enzyme class is 3-oxopropanoate:NAD(P)+ oxidoreductase. This enzyme participates in beta-alanine metabolism.
