= Β-Alanine ethyl ester =

β-Alanine ethyl ester
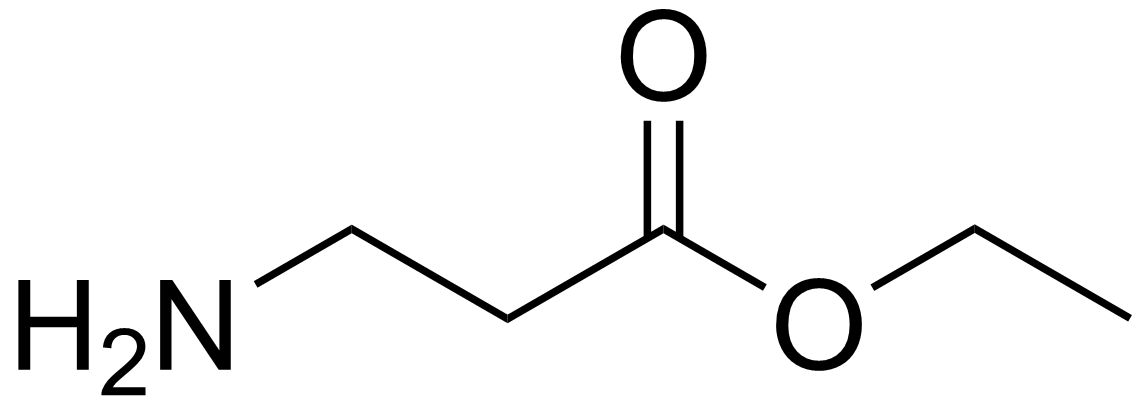

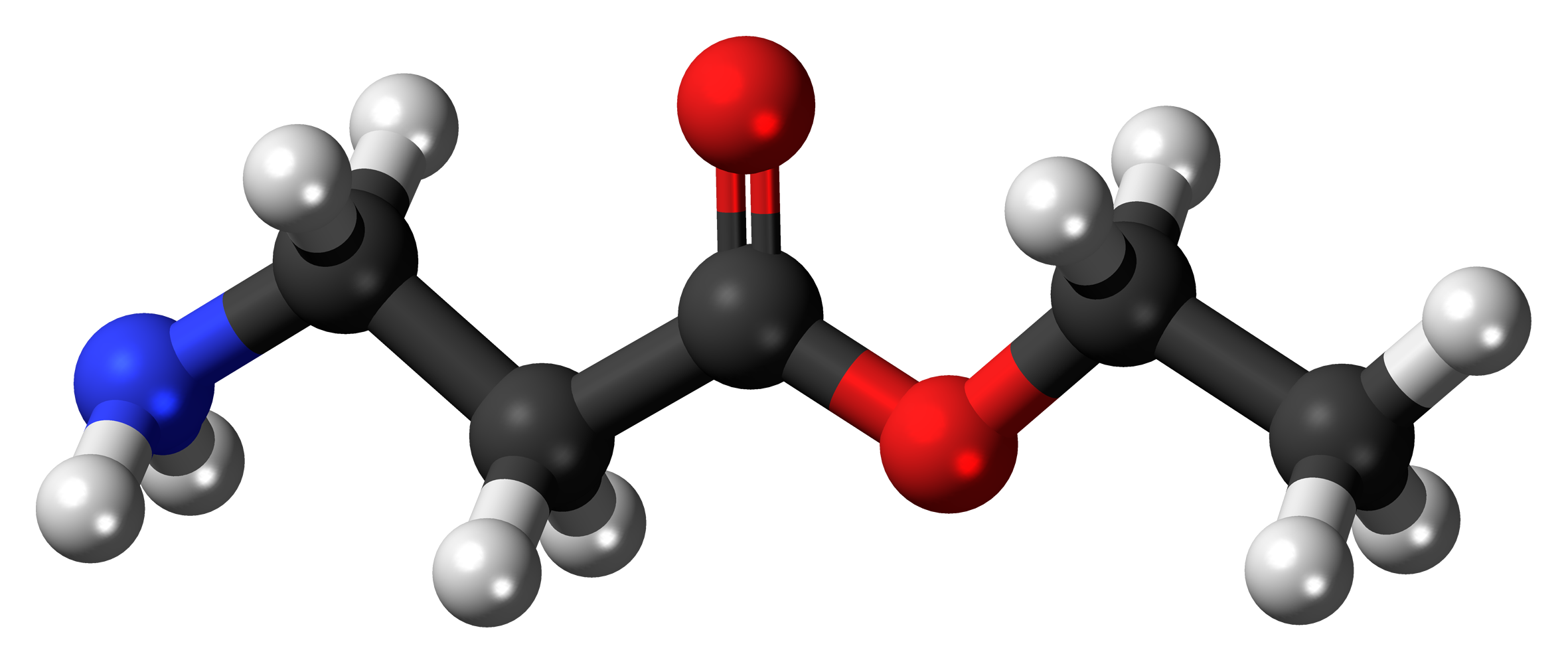

Names
- IUPAC name Ethyl β-alaninate
- Systematic IUPAC name Ethyl 3-aminopropanoate
- Other names Ethyl 3-aminopropionate Ethyl β-alanate Ethyl β-aminopropionate Ethyl β-aminopropoanoate 3-Aminopropionic acid ethyl ester 3-Aminopropanoic acid ethyl ester

Identifiers
CAS Number	924-73-2 (free base); 4244-84-2 (hydrochloride)
3D model (JSmol)	Interactive image
ChemSpider	371693
PubChem CID	419889
UNII	ZWD52URW2Y
CompTox Dashboard (EPA)	DTXSID20329386
- InChI: InChI=1S/C5H11NO2/c1-2-8-5(7)3-4-6/h2-4,6H2,1H3 Key: GSQBIOQCECCMOQ-UHFFFAOYSA-N; InChI=1/C5H11NO2/c1-2-8-5(7)3-4-6/h2-4,6H2,1H3 Key: GSQBIOQCECCMOQ-UHFFFAOYAS
- SMILES: O=C(OCC)CCN

Properties
Chemical formula	C_{5}H_{11}NO_{2}
Molar mass	117.148 g·mol^{−1}
Melting point	65–67 °C (149–153 °F; 338–340 K) hydrochloride
Boiling point	58 °C (136 °F; 331 K) 14 Torr (free base)
- Except where otherwise noted, data are given for materials in their standard state (at 25 °C [77 °F], 100 kPa). verify (what is ?) Infobox references

β-Alanine ethyl ester is the ethyl ester of the non-essential amino acid β-alanine. It would be expected to hydrolyse within the body to form β-alanine.
