= X-His dipeptidase =

Xaa-His dipeptidase
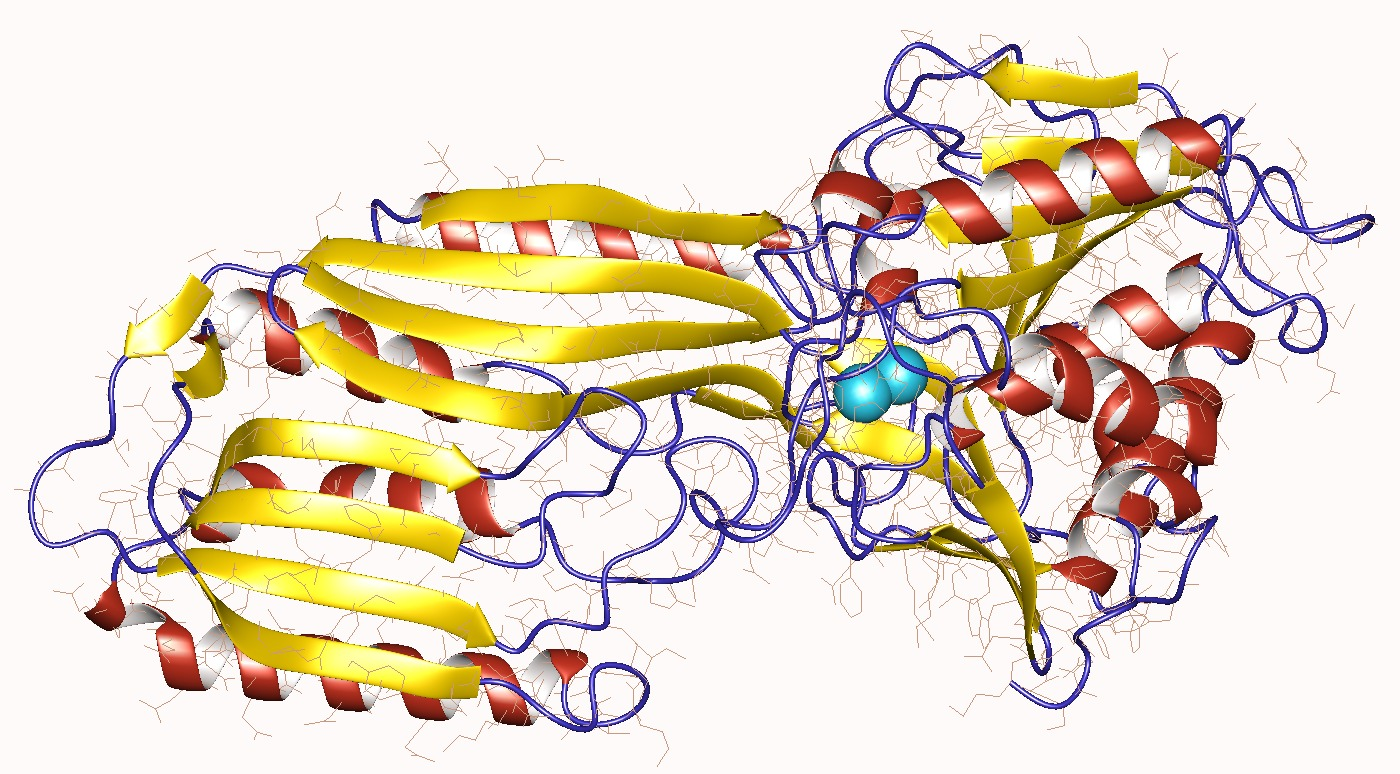
- Aminoacylhistidine dipeptidase monomer, Vibrio alginolyticus

Identifiers
- EC no.: 3.4.13.3
- CAS no.: 9027-21-8

Databases
- IntEnz: IntEnz view
- BRENDA: BRENDA entry
- ExPASy: NiceZyme view
- KEGG: KEGG entry
- MetaCyc: metabolic pathway
- PRIAM: profile
- PDB structures: RCSB PDB PDBe PDBsum
Search
- PMC: articles
- PubMed: articles
- NCBI: proteins

Xaa-His dipeptidase (EC 3.4.13.3, aminoacylhistidine dipeptidase, carnosinase, homocarnosinase, dipeptidase M) is an enzyme. This enzyme catalyses the following chemical reaction

Hydrolysis of Xaa-His dipeptides

This mammalian cytosolic enzyme also acts on anserine and homocarnosine.
