= Flavin reductase (NADH) =

Identifiers
- EC no.: 1.5.1.36

Databases
- IntEnz: IntEnz view
- BRENDA: BRENDA entry
- ExPASy: NiceZyme view
- KEGG: KEGG entry
- MetaCyc: metabolic pathway
- PRIAM: profile
- PDB structures: RCSB PDB PDBe PDBsum
Search
- PMC: articles
- PubMed: articles
- NCBI: proteins

Flavin reductase (NADH) (EC 1.5.1.36, NADH-dependent flavin reductase, flavin:NADH oxidoreductase) is an enzyme with systematic name flavin:NAD^{+} oxidoreductase. This enzyme catalyses the following chemical reaction

reduced flavin + NAD^{+} $\rightleftharpoons$ flavin + NADH + H^{+}

The Escherichia coli enzyme reduces free flavins by NADH.
