= Rostovtsev =

Rostovtsev (Russian: Ростовцев) is a Russian masculine surname, its feminine counterpart is Rostovtseva. It may refer to

- Michael Rostovtzeff (1870–1952), Soviet historian
- Mikhail Rostovtsev (actor) (1872-1948), Soviet opera singer and actor
- Pavel Rostovtsev (born 1971), Russian biathlete
- Yakov Rostovtsev (1803–1860), Russian military officer and statesman
