= Methionylglycine =

Names
- IUPAC name (S)-[2-Amino-4-(methylsulfanyl)butanoyl]amino)acetic acid
- Other names L-Methionyl-L-glycine

Identifiers
CAS Number	14486-03-4 (L-)
3D model (JSmol)	Interactive image
Abbreviations	met-gly
ChEBI	CHEBI:174028
ChEMBL	ChEMBL1222056
ChemSpider	227490
ECHA InfoCard	100.034.973
PubChem CID	6992930
UNII	T872MM2E20
CompTox Dashboard (EPA)	DTXSID401020087
- InChI: Key: QXOHLNCNYLGICT-YFKPBYRVSA-N
- SMILES: CSCC[C@H](N)C(=O)NCC(O)=O

Properties
Chemical formula	C_{7}H_{14}N_{2}O_{3}S
Molar mass	206.26 g·mol^{−1}
Melting point	182-183 °C (dec) (L); 211-212 °C (dec) (L); 181 °C (dec) (D)
- Except where otherwise noted, data are given for materials in their standard state (at 25 °C [77 °F], 100 kPa). Infobox references

Methionyl-glycine is a dipeptide consisting of the amino acids methionine and glycine. This compound can be used for studying metabolomics and nutrient uptake/absorption.
