= Dmitry Pryanishnikov =

Russian agricultural chemist, biochemist, plant physiologist

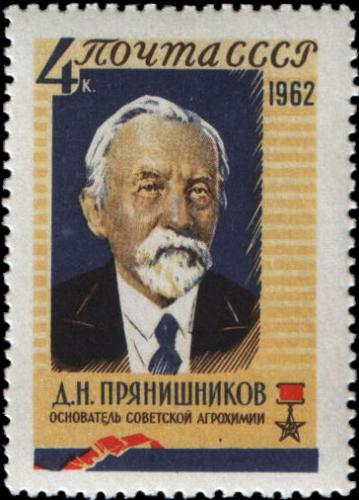
- Postage stamp
- Born: Dmitry Nikolayevich Pryanishnikov; 6 November 1865; Kyakhta, Transbaikal Oblast, Russian Empire
- Died: 30 April 1948 (aged 82); Moscow, Russian SFSR, Soviet Union
- Education: Imperial Moscow University
- Occupation: scientist

Dmitry Nikolayevich Pryanishnikov (Russian: Дми́трий Никола́евич Пря́нишников; 6 November 1865 — 30 April 1948) was a Soviet and Russian agrochemist, biochemist and plant physiologist, founder of the Soviet scientific school in agronomic chemistry. Hero of Socialist Labour (1945). Winner of Lenin Prize (1926), Stalin Prize (1941) and Timiryazev Prize (1945).

Academician of the Academy of Sciences of the Soviet Union (1929) and the Academy of Agricultural Sciences (1936), corresponding member of the French Academy of Sciences, founder and director of the Scientific Institute for Fertilizers chemicalization of the national economy.

He was also notable for decency and civil courage. For example, for several years he tried to rescue a geneticist Nikolai Vavilov from prison, for this he sought a personal reception from Beria and his deputy Kobulov, wrote several letters to Stalin, and also presented Vavilov who was imprisoned award and put forward his candidacy for election to the Supreme Soviet of the Soviet Union.
