= Carnosine =

Chemical compound

Names
- IUPAC name β-Alanylhistidine
- Systematic IUPAC name (2S)-2-(3-Aminopropanamido)-3-(3H-imidazol-4-yl)propanoic acid
- Other names β-Alanyl-L-histidine

Identifiers
CAS Number	305-84-0
3D model (JSmol)	Interactive image; Interactive image
ChEBI	CHEBI:15727
ChEMBL	ChEMBL242948
ChemSpider	388363
ECHA InfoCard	100.005.610
IUPHAR/BPS	4559
KEGG	C00386
PubChem CID	439224
UNII	8HO6PVN24W
CompTox Dashboard (EPA)	DTXSID80879594
- InChI: InChI=1S/C9H14N4O3/c10-2-1-8(14)13-7(9(15)16)3-6-4-11-5-12-6/h4-5,7H,1-3,10H2,(H,11,12)(H,13,14)(H,15,16)/t7-/m0/s1 Key: CQOVPNPJLQNMDC-ZETCQYMHSA-N; InChI=1/C9H14N4O3/c10-2-1-8(14)13-7(9(15)16)3-6-4-11-5-12-6/h4-5,7H,1-3,10H2,(H,11,12)(H,13,14)(H,15,16)/t7-/m0/s1 Key: CQOVPNPJLQNMDC-ZETCQYMHBX
- SMILES: O=C(O)C(NC(=O)CCN)Cc1c[nH]cn1; c1c(nc[nH]1)C[C@@H](C(=O)O)NC(=O)CCN

Properties
Chemical formula	C_{9}H_{14}N_{4}O_{3}
Molar mass	226.236 g·mol^{−1}
Appearance	Crystalline solid
Melting point	253 °C (487 °F; 526 K) (decomposition)
- Except where otherwise noted, data are given for materials in their standard state (at 25 °C [77 °F], 100 kPa). verify (what is ?) Infobox references

Carnosine (beta-alanyl-L-histidine) is a dipeptide molecule, made up of the amino acids beta-alanine and histidine. It is highly concentrated in muscle and brain tissues. Carnosine was discovered by Russian chemist Vladimir Gulevich.

Carnosine is naturally produced by the body in the liver from beta-alanine and histidine. Like carnitine, carnosine is composed of the root word carn, meaning "flesh", alluding to its prevalence in meat. There are no plant-based sources of carnosine. Carnosine is readily available as a synthetic nutritional supplement.

Carnosine can chelate divalent metal ions. Carnosine is also considered a geroprotectant.

Products containing carnosine are also used in topical preparations to reduce wrinkles on the skin.

Carnosine may increase the Hayflick limit in human fibroblasts, it also appears to reduce the rate of telomere shortening. This could potentially promote the growth of certain cancers that thrive due to telomere preservation.

== Biosynthesis ==
Carnosine is synthesized within the body from beta-alanine and histidine. Beta-alanine is a product of pyrimidine catabolism and histidine is an essential amino acid. Since beta-alanine is the limiting substrate, supplementing just beta-alanine effectively increases the intramuscular concentration of carnosine.

== Physiological effects ==
=== pH buffer ===
Carnosine has a pK_{a} value of 6.83, making it a good buffer for the pH range of animal muscles. Since beta-alanine is not incorporated into proteins, carnosine can be stored at relatively high concentrations (millimolar). Occurring at 17–25 mmol/kg (dry muscle), carnosine (β-alanyl-L-histidine) is an important intramuscular buffer, constituting 10–20% of the total buffering capacity in type I and II muscle fibres.

=== Anti-oxidant ===
Carnosine has been shown to scavenge reactive oxygen species (ROS) as well as alpha-beta unsaturated aldehydes formed from peroxidation of cell membrane fatty acids during oxidative stress. It also buffers pH in muscle cells, and acts as a neurotransmitter in the brain. It is also a zwitterion, a neutral molecule with a positive and negative end.

=== Antiglycating ===
Carnosine acts as an antiglycating agent, reducing the rate of formation of advanced glycation end-products or AGEs (substances that can be a factor in the development or worsening of many degenerative diseases, such as Type 1 and Type 2 Diabetes, Atherosclerosis, Chronic Kidney Failure, and Alzheimer's disease), and ultimately reducing development of atherosclerotic plaque build-up and bleeds in microvessels.

=== Geroprotective ===
Carnosine is considered as a geroprotector. Carnosine can increase the Hayflick limit in human fibroblasts, as well as appearing to reduce the telomere shortening rate. Carnosine may also slow aging through its anti-glycating properties (chronic glycolysis is speculated to accelerate aging).

=== Other ===
Carnosine can chelate divalent metal ions. It has been suggested that binding Ca^{2+} may displace protons, thereby providing a link between Ca^{2+} and H^{+} buffering. However, there is still controversy as to how much Ca^{2+} is bound to carnosine under physiological conditions.

== See also ==
- Acetylcarnosine, a similar molecule used to treat lens cataracts
- Anserine, another dipeptide antioxidant (found in birds)
- Carnosine synthase, an enzyme that helps carnosine production
- Carnosinemia, a disease of excess carnosine due to an enzyme defect/deficiency
