= Alexander Maysuryan =

Soviet journalist (born 1969)

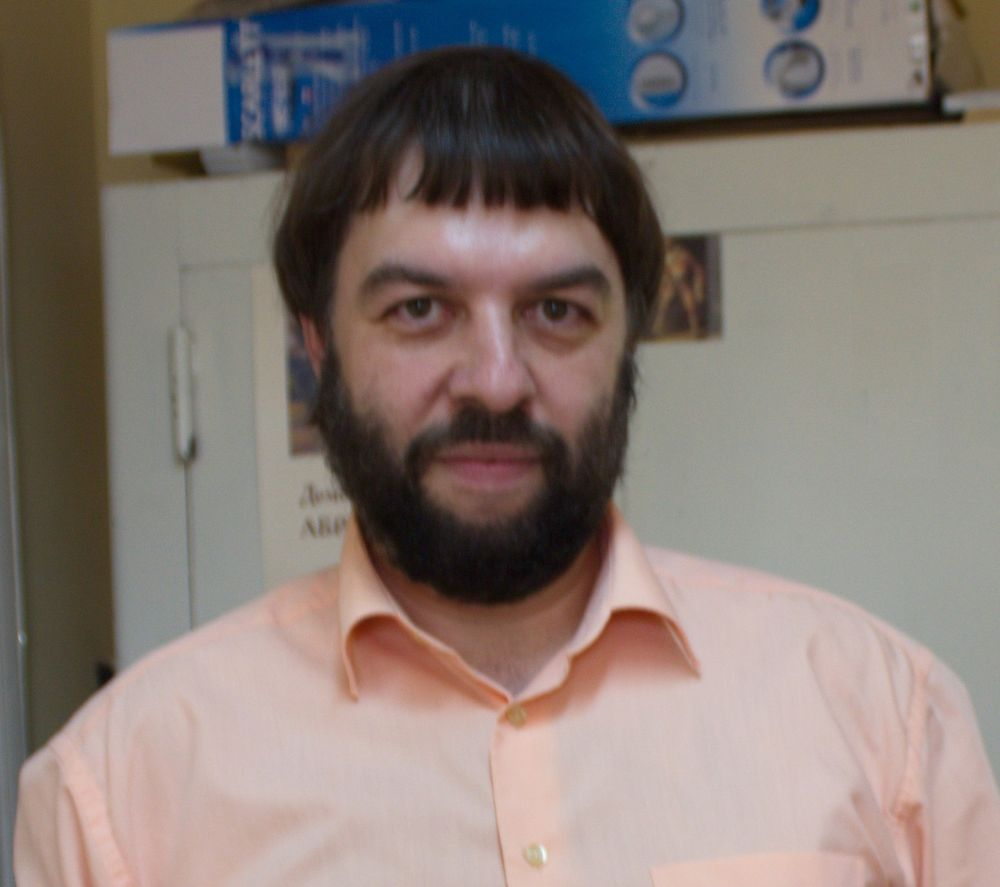
- Born: June 10, 1969 (age 57)
- Education: Moscow State University
- Occupations: Author, political activist
- Employer: Abramtsevo Colony
- Political party: Democratic Union
- Website: maysuryan.livejournal.com

Alexander Alexandrovich Maysuryan (Russian: Александр Александрович Майсурян; b. June 15, 1969 in Moscow) is a Russian author and far-left political activist. He is a journalist, and the author of works on history and biology.

== Personal life and education ==
He is of Armenian origin. Alexander Maysuryan is a distant relative of Alexander Atabekian. He studied at Moscow State University's Faculty of Biology. In 1987—1989 he lived in Murmansk Oblast. Now he is called a Moscow blogger. Boris Stomakhin corresponded with him. Maysuryan is a Marxist. Aleksandr Kommari called him an "intelligent person".

== Career ==
Alexander Maysuryan is a political journalist. He is a member of the Democratic Union. He also is a human rights activist, and a blogger (at LiveJournal, listed in the Top 100 bloggers). Maysuryan starred in documentaries as a writer. He is the editor of The Encyclopedia for Children (Аванта +, 1994). He is the author of books including "Развитие в природе, культуре и истории : исслед. в форме диалогов" (Клуб XXI в., 2000, 384 p., ISBN 5-8237-0091-1). He is a biographer of Lenin and Brezhnev. He worked in a museum for over ten years. His articles are republished by the Russian Communist Workers' Party of the Communist Party of the Soviet Union.

== Books ==
- Энциклопедия для детей. Т. 2. Биология («Аванта+», 1993; 1994, (ISBN 5-86529-012-6; 1996).
- Энциклопедия для детей : 13 т. Т. 5: История России : ч. 3. ХХ век / ред. т. А. Майсурян. – М., 1995. – 672 с. : ил.; – 100000 экз. – ISBN 5-86529-042-8.
- «Другой Брежнев» (М.: «Вагриус», 2004) ISBN 5-475-00021-2.
  - Aleksandr Maisurjan. "Teistmoodi Brežnev".. Varrak, 2013. ISBN 978-9985-3-2706-7.
- «Другой Ленин» (М.: «Вагриус», 2006)
