= Russian State Agrarian University – Moscow Timiryazev Agricultural Academy =

Public university in Moscow, Russia

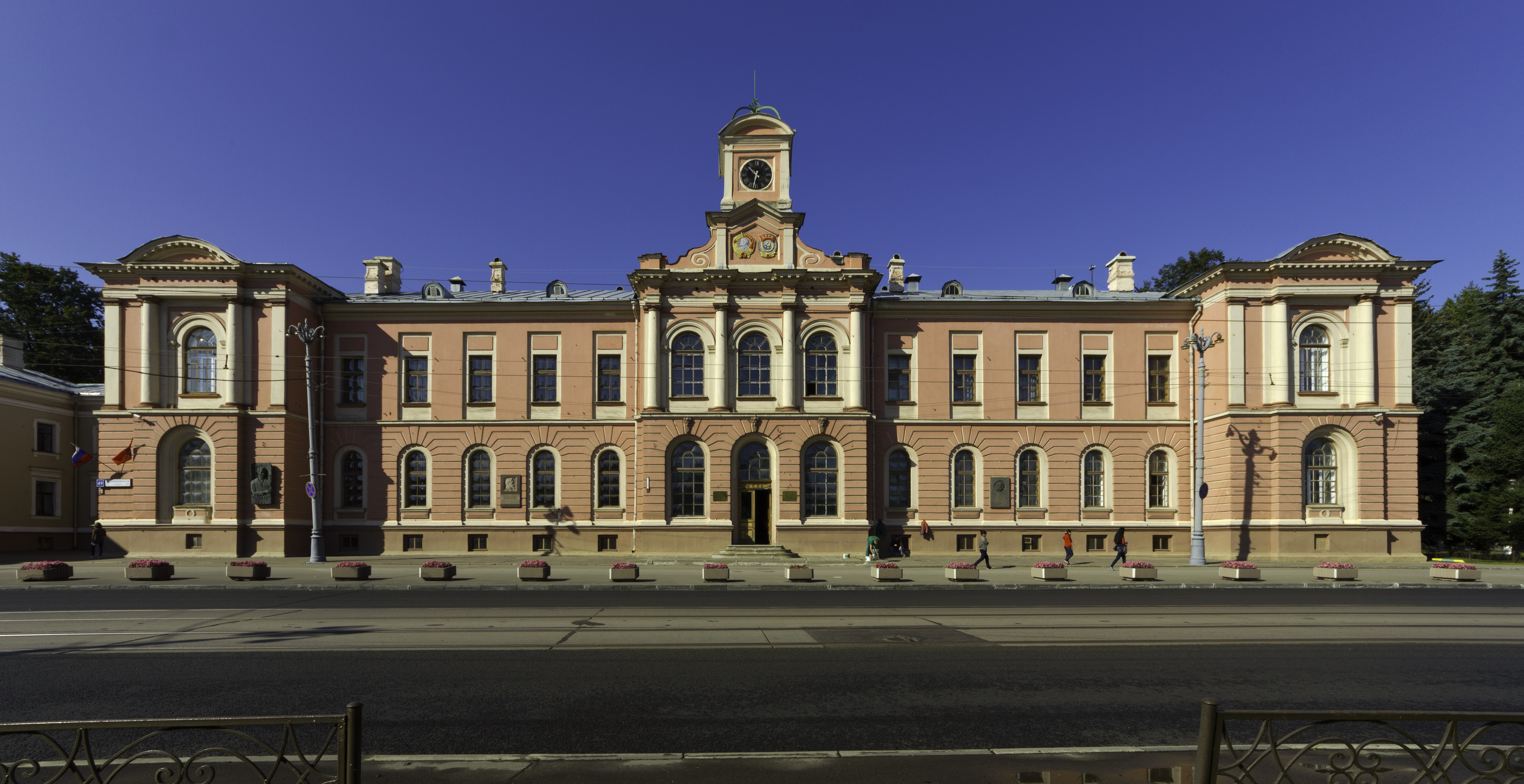
- Timiryazev Academy main building
- Former names: Petrovskaya Agricultural Academy; Moscow Agricultural Institute
- Type: State university
- Established: 1865
- Rector: Vladimir Truhachev
- Academic staff: 700
- Undergraduates: >10,000
- Postgraduates: 70 p.a.
- Location: Moscow, Russia; 55.833°N 37.550°E
- Campus: Urban (originally suburban)
- Colors: Green
- Website: www.timacad.ru

University rankings

Global – Overall
- QS World: 1,201 (2023)

Regional – Overall
- QS Emerging Europe and Central Asia: 251-300 (2022)

Moscow Timiryazev Agricultural Academy (full name in Russian: Российский государственный аграрный университет — МСХА имени К.А. Тимирязева) is one of the oldest agrarian educational institutions in Moscow, Russia. It was founded on December 3, 1865. It is under the Supervisory of the Russian Ministry of Agriculture. It was named for Kliment Timiryazev, a Russian botanist and physiologist and proponent of evolution by natural selection. Prior to this it was called the Petrovsky Agricultural Academy.
