= Anserine =

Names
- Systematic IUPAC name (2S)-2-(3-Aminopropanamido)-3-(1-methyl-1H-imidazol-5-yl)propanoic acid
- Other names beta-Alanyl-3-methyl-L-histidine

Identifiers
CAS Number	584-85-0
3D model (JSmol)	Interactive image
ChEBI	CHEBI:18323
ChEMBL	ChEMBL448301
ChemSpider	100482
ECHA InfoCard	100.008.679
KEGG	C01262
PubChem CID	112072
UNII	HDQ4N37UGV
CompTox Dashboard (EPA)	DTXSID30973950
- InChI: InChI=1S/C10H16N4O3/c1-14-6-12-5-7(14)4-8(10(16)17)13-9(15)2-3-11/h5-6,8H,2-4,11H2,1H3,(H,13,15)(H,16,17)/t8-/m0/s1 Key: MYYIAHXIVFADCU-QMMMGPOBSA-N; InChI=1/C10H16N4O3/c1-14-6-12-5-7(14)4-8(10(16)17)13-9(15)2-3-11/h5-6,8H,2-4,11H2,1H3,(H,13,15)(H,16,17)/t8-/m0/s1 Key: MYYIAHXIVFADCU-QMMMGPOBBJ
- SMILES: O=C(O)[C@@H](NC(=O)CCN)Cc1cncn1C

Properties
Chemical formula	C_{10}H_{16}N_{4}O_{3}
Molar mass	240.25904 g/mol
- Except where otherwise noted, data are given for materials in their standard state (at 25 °C [77 °F], 100 kPa). verify (what is ?) Infobox references

Anserine (β-alanyl-3-methylhistidine) is a dipeptide containing β-alanine and 3-methylhistidine. Anserine is a derivative of carnosine, which has been methylated.

Anserine has biological activities similar to those of carnosine, including buffering activity, antioxidant properties, metal ion chelation, and anti-aggregation effects. Both anserine and carnosine chelate copper. Because of its methylation, anserine is more stable in serum and resistant to degradation than carnosine. Compared with carnosine, anserine have a higher antioxidant capacity.

Anserine can be found in the skeletal muscle and brain of mammals and birds. Anserine is also found in human kidney.

The pKa of the imidazole ring of histidine, when contained in anserine, is 7.04.

== Biosynthesis ==
Anserine can be synthesized through methylation of carnosine, by carnosine N-methyltransferase (CARNMT1).

== Anti-inflammatory effects ==
High concentration of anserine reduced interstitial inflammation and alleviated Kidney Fibrosis in Type-1 diabetic mice with Carnosinase-1 knock-out on high fat diet. In another high-fat diet model, anserine treatment exhibited hypolipidemic and anti-obesity effects by inhibiting p-NF-κB p65 expression.

== Metal binding ==
Both anserine and carnosine bind copper and other transition metals. Chelation of transition metals is one mechanism for their antioxidant activity.

== See also ==
- Carnosine
