= Β-Alanine =

β-Alanine

Names
- IUPAC name β-Alanine
- Systematic IUPAC name 3-Aminopropanoic acid
- Other names 3-Aminopropionic acid

Identifiers
CAS Number	107-95-9
3D model (JSmol)	Interactive image
ChEBI	CHEBI:16958
ChEMBL	ChEMBL297569
ChemSpider	234
DrugBank	DB03107
ECHA InfoCard	100.003.215
EC Number	203-536-5
IUPHAR/BPS	2365
KEGG	D07561
PubChem CID	239
UNII	11P2JDE17B
CompTox Dashboard (EPA)	DTXSID0030823
- InChI: InChI=1S/C3H7NO2/c4-2-1-3(5)6/h1-2,4H2,(H,5,6) Key: UCMIRNVEIXFBKS-UHFFFAOYSA-N; InChI=1/C3H7NO2/c4-2-1-3(5)6/h1-2,4H2,(H,5,6) Key: UCMIRNVEIXFBKS-UHFFFAOYAL
- SMILES: O=C(O)CCN

Properties
Chemical formula	C_{3}H_{7}NO_{2}
Molar mass	89.094 g·mol^{−1}
Appearance	white bipyramidal crystals
Odor	odorless
Density	1.437 g/cm^{3} (19 °C)
Melting point	207 °C (405 °F; 480 K) (decomposes)
Solubility in water	54.5 g/100 mL
Solubility	soluble in methanol. Insoluble in diethyl ether, acetone
log P	−3.05
Acidity (pK_{a})	3.55 (carboxyl; H_{2}O); 10.24 (amino; H_{2}O)

Hazards
- Occupational safety and health (OHS/OSH)
Main hazards	Irritant
NFPA 704 (fire diamond)	2 1 0
- Lethal dose or concentration (LD, LC)
LD_{50} (median dose)	1000 mg/kg (rat, oral)
- Safety data sheet (SDS)
- Except where otherwise noted, data are given for materials in their standard state (at 25 °C [77 °F], 100 kPa). verify (what is ?) Infobox references

β-Alanine (beta-alanine) is a naturally occurring beta amino acid. Beta amino acids are amino acids in which the amino group is attached to the β-carbon atom (i.e. the carbon atom two carbon atoms away from the carboxylate group) instead of the more usual α-carbon atom for alanine (α-alanine). The IUPAC name for β-alanine is 3-aminopropanoic acid. Unlike its counterpart α-alanine, β-alanine has no stereocenter.

== Biosynthesis and industrial route ==
In terms of its biosynthesis, it is formed by the degradation of dihydrouracil and carnosine. β-Alanine ethyl ester is the ethyl ester which hydrolyses within the body to form β-alanine. It is produced industrially by the reaction of ammonia with β-propiolactone.

Sources for β-alanine includes pyrimidine catabolism of cytosine and uracil.

== Biochemical function ==
β-Alanine residues are rare. It is a component of the peptides carnosine and anserine and also of pantothenic acid (vitamin B_{5}), which itself is a component of coenzyme A. β-alanine is metabolized into acetic acid.

=== Precursor of carnosine ===
β-Alanine is the rate-limiting precursor of carnosine, which is to say carnosine levels are limited by the amount of available β-alanine, not histidine. Supplementation with β-alanine has been shown to increase the concentration of carnosine in muscles, decrease fatigue in athletes, and increase total muscular work done. Simply supplementing with carnosine is not as effective as supplementing with β-alanine alone since carnosine, when taken orally, is broken down during digestion to its components, histidine (which people usually already have enough of from regular protein consumption) and β-alanine. Hence, by weight, only about 40% of the dose is available as β-alanine.

Comparison of β-alanine (right) with the more customary, chiral, α-amino acid, L-α-alanine (left)

Because β-alanine dipeptides are not incorporated into proteins, they can be stored at relatively high concentrations. Occurring at 17–25 mmol/kg (dry muscle), carnosine (β-alanyl-L-histidine) is an important intramuscular buffer, constituting 10-20% of the total buffering capacity in type I and II muscle fibres. In carnosine, the pK_{a} of the imidazolium group is 6.83, which is ideal for buffering.

=== Receptors ===
Even though much weaker than glycine (and, thus, with a debated role as a physiological transmitter), β-alanine is an agonist next in activity to the cognate ligand glycine itself, for strychnine-sensitive inhibitory glycine receptors (GlyRs) (the agonist order: glycine ≫ β-alanine > taurine ≫ alanine, L-serine > proline).

β-alanine has five known receptor sites, including GABA-A, GABA-C a co-agonist site (with glycine) on NMDA receptors, the aforementioned GlyR site, and blockade of GAT protein-mediated glial GABA uptake, making it a putative "small molecule neurotransmitter."

== Athletic performance enhancement ==
There is evidence that β-alanine supplementation can increase exercise and cognitive performance, for some sporting modalities, and exercises within a 0.5–10 min time frame. β-alanine is converted within muscle cells into carnosine, which acts as a buffer for the lactic acid produced during high-intensity exercises, and helps delay the onset of neuromuscular fatigue.

Ingestion of β-alanine can cause paraesthesia, reported as a tingling sensation, in a dose-dependent fashion. Aside from this, no important adverse effect of β-alanine has been reported, however, there is also no information on the effects of its long-term usage or its safety in combination with other supplements, and caution on its use has been advised. Furthermore, many studies have failed to test for the purity of the supplements used and check for the presence of banned substances.

== Metabolism ==
β-Alanine can undergo a transamination reaction with pyruvate to form malonate-semialdehyde and L-alanine. The malonate semialdehyde can then be converted into malonate via malonate-semialdehyde dehydrogenase. Malonate is then converted into malonyl-CoA and enter fatty acid biosynthesis.

Alternatively, β-alanine can be diverted into pantothenic acid and coenzyme A biosynthesis.
