= Dipeptide =

Shortest peptide molecule, containing two amino acids joined by a single peptide bond

A dipeptide is an organic compound derived from two amino acids. The constituent amino acids can be the same or different. When different, two isomers of the dipeptide are possible, depending on the sequence. Several dipeptides are physiologically important, and some are both physiologically and commercially significant. A well known dipeptide is aspartame, an artificial sweetener.

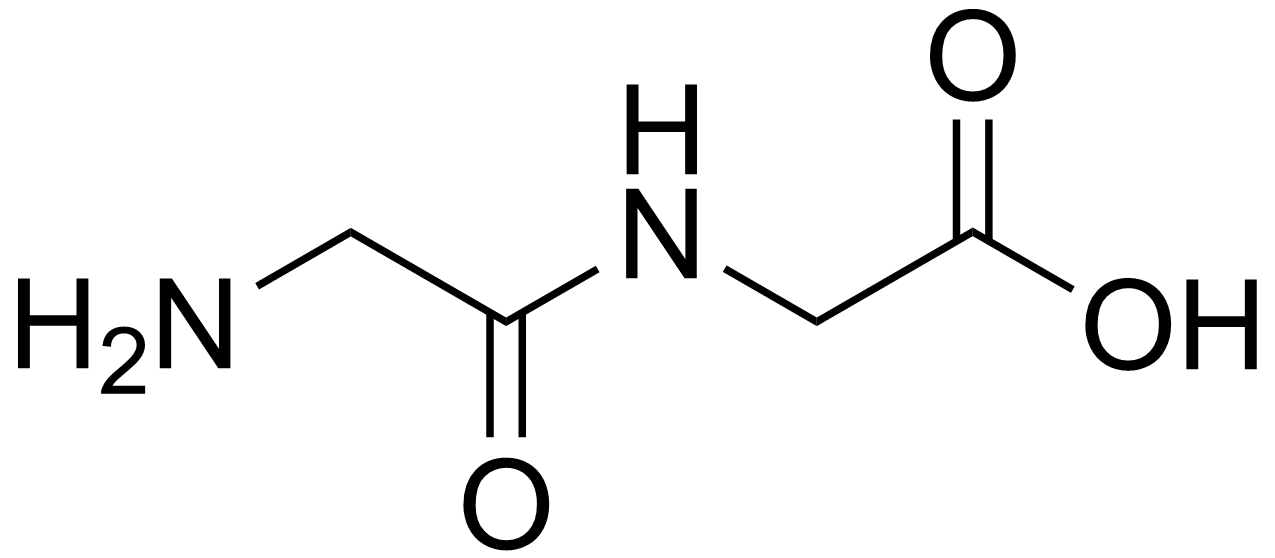
Glycylglycine is the simplest dipeptide.

Dipeptides are white solids. Many are far more water-soluble than the parent amino acids. For example, the dipeptide Ala-Gln has the solubility of 586 g/L more than 10x the solubility of Gln (35 g/L). Dipeptides also can exhibit different stabilities, e.g. with respect to hydrolysis. Gln does not withstand sterilization procedures, whereas this dipeptide does. Because dipeptides are prone to hydrolysis, the high solubility is exploited in infusions, i.e. to provide nutrition.

== Examples ==
Aspartame is produced commercially as an artificial sweetener.

=== Commercial value ===
About six dipeptides are of commercial interest.

- Aspartame (N-L-α-aspartyl-L-phenylalanine 1-methyl ester) is an artificial sweetener.
- Carnosine (beta-alanyl-L-histidine) and Anserine (beta-alanyl-N-methyl histidine) are highly concentrated in muscle and brain tissues. They are used in sports medicines.
- Acetylcarnosine, cataract prevention
- Ala-Gln and Gly-Tyr, infusion
- Val-Tyr, antihypertensive

=== Other dipeptides ===
- Homoanserine (N-(4-aminobutyryl)-L-histidine) is another dipeptide identified in the brain and muscles of mammals.
- Kyotorphin (L-tyrosyl-L-arginine) is a neuroactive dipeptide which plays a role in pain regulation in the brain.
- Balenine (or ophidine) (beta-alanyl-N tau-methyl histidine) has been identified in the muscles of several species of mammal (including man), and the chicken.
- Glorin (N-propionyl-γ-L-glutamyl-L-ornithine-δ-lac ethyl ester) is a chemotactic dipeptide for the slime mold Polysphondylium violaceum.
- Barettin (cyclo-[(6-bromo-8-en-tryptophan)-arginine]) is a cyclic dipeptide from the marine sponge Geodia barretti.
- Dialanine is commonly used as a model in molecular dynamics.
- Xenortides, isolated from the bacterium Xenorhabdus nematophila
- Oglufanide (H-L-Glu-Trp-OH, also known as Thymogen), immunomodulator researched for conditions including Hepatitis C.

== Production ==
=== Synthetic dipeptides ===
Dipeptides are produced by coupling amino acids. The amino group on one amino acid is rendered non-nucleophilic (P in eq) and the carboxylic acid group in the second amino acid is deactivated as its methyl ester. The two modified amino acids are then combined in the presence of a coupling agent, which facilitates formation of the amide bond:

RCH(NHP)CO_{2}H + R'CH(NH_{2})CO_{2}CH_{3} → RCH(NHP)C(O)NH(CHR')CO_{2}CH_{3} + H_{2}O

Subsequent to this coupling reaction, the amine protecting group P and the ester are converted to the free amine and carboxylic acid, respectively.

For many amino acids, the ancillary functional groups are protected. The condensation of the amine and the carboxylic acid to form the peptide bond generally employs coupling agents to activate the carboxylic acid.

The Bergmann azlactone peptide synthesis is a classic organic synthesis for the preparation of dipeptides.

=== Biosynthesis ===
Dipeptides are produced from polypeptides by the action of the hydrolase enzyme dipeptidyl peptidase. Dietary proteins are digested to dipeptides and amino acids, and the dipeptides are absorbed more rapidly than the amino acids, because their uptake involves a separate mechanism. Dipeptides activate G-cells found in the stomach to secrete gastrin.

== Diketopiperazines (cyclic dipeptides) ==
Retosiban is a cyclic dipeptide being investigated as an oral drug.

Diketopiperazines are a special class of dipeptides, which are cyclic. They form as side products in peptide synthesis. Many have been produced from non-canonical amino acids.
