= 4-Hydroxybenzoic acid =

- Skeletal formula

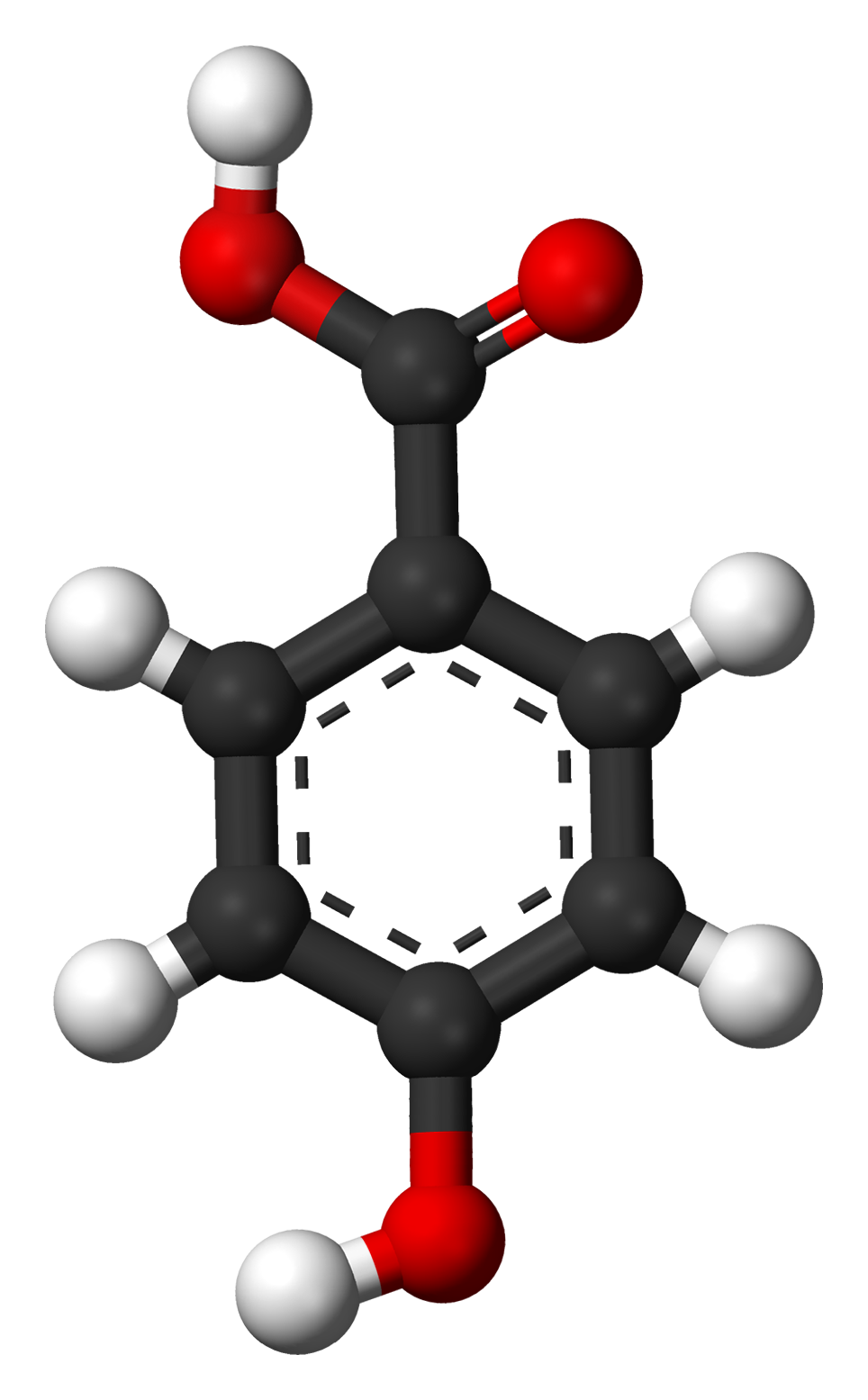
- Ball-and-stick model

Names
- Preferred IUPAC name 4-Hydroxybenzoic acid
- Other names p-Hydroxybenzoic acid para-Hydroxybenzoic acid PHBA; 4-hydroxybenzoate

Identifiers
CAS Number	99-96-7
3D model (JSmol)	Interactive image; Interactive image
ChEBI	CHEBI:30763
ChEMBL	ChEMBL441343
ChemSpider	132
DrugBank	DB04242
ECHA InfoCard	100.002.550
EC Number	202-804-9
IUPHAR/BPS	5783
KEGG	C00156
PubChem CID	135
UNII	JG8Z55Y12H
CompTox Dashboard (EPA)	DTXSID3026647
- InChI: InChI=1S/C7H6O3/c8-6-3-1-5(2-4-6)7(9)10/h1-4,8H,(H,9,10) Key: FJKROLUGYXJWQN-UHFFFAOYSA-N
- SMILES: O=C(O)c1ccc(O)cc1; c1cc(ccc1C(=O)O)O

Properties
Chemical formula	C_{7}H_{6}O_{3}
Molar mass	138.122 g·mol^{−1}
Appearance	White crystalline solid
Odor	Odorless
Density	1.46 g/cm^{3}
Melting point	214.5 °C (418.1 °F; 487.6 K)
Boiling point	N/A, decomposes
Solubility in water	0.5 g/100 mL
Solubility	Soluble in alcohol, ether, acetone; Slightly soluble in chloroform; Negligibly in CS_{2}
log P	1.58
Acidity (pK_{a})	4.54

Hazards
- Occupational safety and health (OHS/OSH)
Main hazards	Irritant
- GHS labelling
Pictograms	(GHS05: Corrosive) (GHS07: Exclamation mark)
Signal word	Danger
Hazard statements	H315, H318, H319, H335
Precautionary statements	P261, P264, P264+P265, P271, P280, P302+P352, P304+P340, P305+P351+P338, P305+P354+P338, P317, P319, P321, P332+P317, P337+P317, P362+P364, P403+P233, P405, P501
NFPA 704 (fire diamond)	2 0 0
Autoignition temperature	250 °C (482 °F; 523 K)
- Lethal dose or concentration (LD, LC)
LD_{50} (median dose)	2200 mg/kg (oral, mouse)
Safety data sheet (SDS)	HMDB
- Except where otherwise noted, data are given for materials in their standard state (at 25 °C [77 °F], 100 kPa). Infobox references

4-Hydroxybenzoic acid, also known as p-hydroxybenzoic acid (PHBA), is a monohydroxybenzoic acid, a phenolic derivative of benzoic acid. It is a white crystalline solid that is slightly soluble in water and chloroform but more soluble in polar organic solvents such as alcohols and acetone. 4-Hydroxybenzoic acid is primarily known as the basis for the preparation of its esters, known as parabens, which are used as preservatives in cosmetics and some ophthalmic solutions. It is isomeric with 2-hydroxybenzoic acid, known as salicylic acid, a precursor to aspirin, and with 3-hydroxybenzoic acid.

== Natural occurrences ==
It is found in plants of the genus Vitex such as V. agnus-castus or V. negundo, and in Hypericum perforatum (St John's wort). It is also found in Spongiochloris spongiosa, a freshwater green alga.

The compound is also found in Ganoderma lucidum, a medicinal mushroom with the longest record of use.

Cryptanaerobacter phenolicus is a bacterium species that produces benzoate from phenol via 4-hydroxybenzoate.

=== Occurrences in food ===
4-Hydroxybenzoic acid can be found naturally in coconut. It is one of the main catechins metabolites found in humans after consumption of green tea infusions. It is also found in wine, in vanilla, in Macrotyloma uniflorum (horse gram), carob and in Phyllanthus acidus (Otaheite gooseberry).

Açaí oil, obtained from the fruit of the açaí palm (Euterpe oleracea), is rich in p-hydroxybenzoic acid (892±52 mg/kg). It is also found in cloudy olive oil and in the edible mushroom Russula virescens (green-cracking russula).

== Related compounds ==
p-Hydroxybenzoic acid glucoside can be found in mycorrhizal and non-mycorrhizal roots of Norway spruces (Picea abies).

Violdelphin is an anthocyanin, a type of plant pigments, found in blue flowers and incorporating two p-hydroxybenzoic acid residues, one rutinoside and two glucosides associated with a delphinidin.

Agnuside is the ester of aucubin and p-hydroxybenzoic acid.

== Biosynthesis ==
Chorismate lyase is an enzyme that transforms chorismate into 4-hydroxybenzoate and pyruvate. This enzyme catalyses the first step in ubiquinone biosynthesis in Escherichia coli and other Gram-negative bacteria.

Benzoate 4-monooxygenase is an enzyme that utilizes benzoate, NADPH, H^{+} and O_{2} to produce 4-hydroxybenzoate, NADP^{+} and H_{2}O. This enzyme can be found in Aspergillus niger.

4-Hydroxybenzoate also arises from tyrosine.

== Metabolism ==
=== As an intermediate ===
The enzyme 4-methoxybenzoate monooxygenase (O-demethylating) transforms 4-methoxybenzoate, an electron acceptor AH_{2} and O_{2} into 4-hydroxybenzoate, formaldehyde, the reduction product A and H_{2}O. This enzyme participates in 2,4-dichlorobenzoate degradation in Pseudomonas putida.

The enzyme 4-hydroxybenzaldehyde dehydrogenase uses 4-hydroxybenzaldehyde, NAD^{+} and H_{2}O to produce 4-hydroxybenzoate, NADH and H^{+}. This enzyme participates in toluene and xylene degradation in bacteria such as Pseudomonas mendocina. It is also found in carrots (Daucus carota).

The enzyme that 2,4'-dihydroxyacetophenone dioxygenase transforms 2,4'-dihydroxyacetophenone and O_{2} into 4-hydroxybenzoate and formate. This enzyme participates in bisphenol A degradation. It can be found in Alcaligenes species.

The enzyme 4-chlorobenzoate dehalogenase uses 4-chlorobenzoate and H_{2}O to produce 4-hydroxybenzoate and chloride. It can be found in Pseudomonas species.

The enzyme 4-hydroxybenzoyl-CoA thioesterase utilizes 4-hydroxybenzoyl-CoA and H_{2}O to produce 4-hydroxybenzoate and CoA. This enzyme participates in 2,4-dichlorobenzoate degradation. It can be found in Pseudomonas species.

The enzyme 4-hydroxybenzoate polyprenyltransferase uses a polyprenyl diphosphate and 4-hydroxybenzoate to produce diphosphate and 4-hydroxy-3-polyprenylbenzoate. This enzyme participates in ubiquinone biosynthesis.

The enzyme 4-hydroxybenzoate geranyltransferase utilizes geranyl diphosphate and 4-hydroxybenzoate to produce 3-geranyl-4-hydroxybenzoate and diphosphate. Biosynthetically, alkannin is produced in plants from the intermediates 4-hydroxybenzoic acid and geranyl pyrophosphate. This enzyme is involved in shikonin biosynthesis. It can be found in Lithospermum erythrorhizon.

The enzyme 3-hydroxybenzoate—CoA ligase uses ATP, 3-hydroxybenzoate and CoA to produce AMP, diphosphate and 3-hydroxybenzoyl-CoA. The enzyme works equally well with 4-hydroxybenzoate. It can be found in Thauera aromatica.

=== Biodegradation ===
The enzyme 4-hydroxybenzoate 1-hydroxylase transforms 4-hydroxybenzoate, NAD(P)H, 2 H^{+} and O_{2} into hydroquinone, NAD(P)^{+}, H_{2}O and CO_{2}. This enzyme participates in 2,4-dichlorobenzoate degradation. It can be found in Candida parapsilosis.

The enzyme 4-hydroxybenzoate 3-monooxygenase transforms 4-hydroxybenzoate, NADPH, H^{+} and O_{2} into protocatechuate, NADP^{+} and H_{2}O. This enzyme participates in benzoate degradation via hydroxylation and 2,4-dichlorobenzoate degradation. It can be found in Pseudomonas putida and Pseudomonas fluorescens.

The enzyme 4-hydroxybenzoate 3-monooxygenase (NAD(P)H) utilizes 4-hydroxybenzoate, NADH, NADPH, H^{+} and O_{2} to produce 3,4-dihydroxybenzoate (protocatechuic acid), NAD^{+}, NADP^{+} and H_{2}O. This enzyme participates in benzoate degradation via hydroxylation and 2,4-dichlorobenzoate degradation. It can be found in Corynebacterium cyclohexanicum and in Pseudomonas sp.

The enzyme 4-hydroxybenzoate decarboxylase uses 4-hydroxybenzoate to produce phenol and CO_{2}. This enzyme participates in benzoate degradation via coenzyme A (CoA) ligation. It can be found in Klebsiella aerogenes (Aerobacter aerogenes).

The enzyme 4-hydroxybenzoate—CoA ligase transforms ATP, 4-hydroxybenzoate and CoA to produce AMP, diphosphate and 4-hydroxybenzoyl-CoA. This enzyme participates in benzoate degradation via CoA ligation. It can be found in Rhodopseudomonas palustris.

Coniochaeta hoffmannii is a plant pathogen that commonly inhabits fertile soil. It is known to metabolize aromatic compounds of low molecular weight, such as p-hydroxybenzoic acid.

=== Glycosylation ===
The enzyme 4-hydroxybenzoate 4-O-beta-D-glucosyltransferase transforms UDP-glucose and 4-hydroxybenzoate into UDP and 4-(beta-D-glucosyloxy)benzoate. It can be found in the pollen of Pinus densiflora.

4-Hydroxybenzoic acid
+ UDP-glucose
UDP
4-Hydroxybenzoic acid 4-O-glucoside

== Chemistry ==
The Hammett equation describes a linear free-energy relationship relating reaction rates and equilibrium constants for many reactions involving benzoic acid derivatives with meta- and para-substituents.

=== Chemical production ===
4-Hydroxybenzoic acid is produced commercially from potassium phenoxide and carbon dioxide in the Kolbe-Schmitt reaction. It can also be produced in the laboratory by heating potassium salicylate with potassium carbonate to 240 °C, followed by treating with acid.

=== Chemical reactions ===
4-Hydroxybenzoic acid has about one tenth the acidity of benzoic acid, having an acid dissociation constant K_{a} = 3.3×10^{−5} M at 19 °C. Its acid dissociation follows this equation:

HOC_{6}H_{4}CO_{2}H ⇌ HOC_{6}H_{4}CO^{−}_{2} + H^{+}

=== Chemical use ===
Vectran is a manufactured fiber, spun from a liquid crystal polymer. Chemically it is an aromatic polyester produced by the polycondensation of 4-hydroxybenzoic acid and 6-hydroxynaphthalene-2-carboxylic acid. The fiber has been shown to exhibit strong radiation shielding used by Bigelow Aerospace and produced by StemRad.

4,4′-Dihydroxybenzophenone is generally prepared by the rearrangement of p-hydroxyphenylbenzoate. Alternatively, p-hydroxybenzoic acid can be converted to p-acetoxybenzoyl chloride. This acid chloride reacts with phenol to give, after deacetylation, 4,4′-dihydroxybenzophenone.

Examples of drugs made from PHBA include nifuroxazide, orthocaine, ormeloxifene and proxymetacaine.

== Bioactivity and safety ==
4-Hydroxybenzoic acid is a popular antioxidant in part because it is rather nontoxic. The LD_{50} is 2200 mg/kg in mice (oral).

4-Hydroxybenzoic acid has weak estrogenic activity both in vitro and in vivo, and stimulates the growth of human breast cancer cell lines. It is a common metabolite of paraben esters, such as methylparaben. The compound is a relatively weak estrogen, but can produce uterotrophy with sufficient doses to an equivalent extent relative to estradiol, which is unusual for a weakly estrogenic compound and indicates that it may be a full agonist of the estrogen receptor with relatively low binding affinity for the receptor. It is about 0.2% to 1% as potent as an estrogen as estradiol.

== Research ==
4-Hydroxybenzoic acid has been used as a precursor to co-enzyme Q10 as an experimental treatment for mitochondrial encephalopathy caused by an inherited deficiency in 4-hydroxyphenylpyruvate dioxygenase-like protein.

== See also ==
- Phenolic content in tea
- Phenolic content in wine
