= 4-hydroxybenzoyl-CoA thioesterase =

Class of enzymes

Identifiers
- EC no.: 3.1.2.23
- CAS no.: 141583-19-9

Databases
- BRENDA: enzyme data
- ExPASy: NiceZyme view
- KEGG: enzyme entry
- MetaCyc: metabolic pathway
- Rhea: reactions
- PDB structures: RCSB PDB PDBe PDBsum
- Gene Ontology: AmiGO / QuickGO
Search
- PMC: articles
- PubMed: articles
- NCBI: proteins

The enzyme 4-hydroxybenzoyl-CoA thioesterase (EC 3.1.2.23) catalyzes the reaction

4-hydroxybenzoyl-CoA
H_{2}O
coenzyme A
+
4-hydroxy
benzoic acid

The enzyme characterised from bacteria hydrolyses 4-hydroxybenzoyl-CoA to coenzyme A and 4-hydroxybenzoic acid, which form the thioester in the starting material. The reaction is part of a biochemical pathway that breaks down chloro-substituted benzoic acids including 4-chlorobenzoic acid in Pseudomonas species.

This enzyme is a hydrolase, specifically one acting on thioester bonds. The systematic name is 4-hydroxybenzoyl-CoA hydrolase.

== Structural studies ==
As of late 2007, 7 structures have been solved for this class of enzymes, with PDB accession codes PDB: 1HN1, PDB: 1LO7, PDB: 1LO8, PDB: 1LO9, PDB: 1Q4S, PDB: 1Q4T, and PDB: 1Q4U. The enzyme contains a so-called HotDog domain.
