= C7H5ClO2 =

The molecular formula C_{7}H_{5}ClO_{2} (molar mass: 156.57 g/mol, exact mass: 155.9978 u) may refer to:

- 2-Chlorobenzoic acid
- 3-Chlorobenzoic acid
- 4-Chlorobenzoic acid
