= 4-Hydroxybenzoate 3-hydroxylase =

4-Hydroxybenzoate 3-hydroxylase may refer to:

- 4-hydroxybenzoate 3-monooxygenase (NAD(P)H)
- 4-hydroxybenzoate 3-monooxygenase
