= Chanochi =

Korean fried rice cake dish

- Type: Chapssal-tteok, jeonbyeong
- Place of origin: Korea
- Associated cuisine: Korean cuisine
- Main ingredients: Glutinous rice flour, purple gromwell

Chanochi (차노치) is a Korean dish. It is pink, pan-fried tteok (rice cake) or jeonbyeong (pancake) made with glutinous rice flour. It is a regional dish of the Yeongnam region.

== Etymology ==
Chanochi (차노치) is a compound of the prefix cha- (차-) and the noun nochi (노치). Cha- means "glutinous", and nochi is a Gyeongsang dialect word for noti (노티), which is a pan-fried tteok (rice cake) made with glutinous proso millet and yeot-gireum (barley malt powder), and usually considered a regional dish of Kwansŏ region.

== Preparation ==
Rice flour is seasoned with salt, dyed pink using purple gromwell, and kneaded with boiling water. The dough is rolled into flat, round pieces and pan-fried in oil. Pan-fried chanochi is coated with honey or sugar.

== See also ==
- Hwajeon
