= Streptomyces poonensis =

Scientific classification
- Domain: Bacteria
- Kingdom: Bacillati
- Phylum: Actinomycetota
- Class: Actinomycetes
- Order: Streptomycetales
- Family: Streptomycetaceae
- Genus: Streptomyces
- Species: S. poonensis

Binomial name
- Streptomyces poonensis Pridham 1970

Type strain
- AS 4.1097, ATCC 15723, Baldacci 681 X, BCRC 13311, CBS 295.66, CBS 786.72, CCRC 13311, CGMCC 4.1097, DSM 40596, HAMBI 987, IFO 12556, IFO 13485, IMET 43406, IMRU 3752, ISP 5596, JCM 3071, JCM 3079, JCM 4815, KCC A-0071, KCC A-0079, KCC S-0815, Lanoot R-8688, LMG 19326, NBRC 12556, NBRC 13485, NRRL B-2319, NRRL B-2951, NRRL B-B-2951, NRRL-ISP 5596, PCM 2246, R-8688, RIA 1446, Thirumalachar D, VKM Ac-1715, WC 3752

Synonyms
- Chainia poonensis

Species of bacterium

Streptomyces poonensis is a bacterium species from the genus of Streptomyces. Streptomyces poonensis can degrade 4-hydroxybenzoate.

== See also ==
- List of Streptomyces species
