= CYP53 family =

Group of cytochrome P450 enzymes

Cytochrome P450, family 53, also known as CYP53, is a cytochrome P450 monooxygenase family in fungi related to hydrocarbon assimilation. They are distributed in both Ascomycota and Basidiomycota, could be used as anti-fungal drug target. The first gene identified in this family is the CYP53A1 from Aspergillus niger encoding the Benzoate 4-monooxygenase (bphA).
