= 3-hydroxybenzoate 6-monooxygenase =

Class of enzymes

Identifiers
- EC no.: 1.14.13.24
- CAS no.: 51570-26-4

Databases
- BRENDA: enzyme data
- ExPASy: NiceZyme view
- KEGG: enzyme entry
- MetaCyc: metabolic pathway
- Rhea: reactions
- PDB structures: RCSB PDB PDBe PDBsum
- Gene Ontology: AmiGO / QuickGO
Search
- PMC: articles
- PubMed: articles
- NCBI: proteins

3-hydroxybenzoate 6-monooxygenase (EC 1.14.13.24) is an enzyme that catalyzes the chemical reaction

3-Hydroxybenzoic acid
+ NADH + H^{+}
O_{2}
H_{2}O
Gentisic acid
+ NAD^{+}

The four substrates of this enzyme are 3-hydroxybenzoic acid, reduced nicotinamide adenine dinucleotide (NADH), oxygen and a proton. Its products are gentisic acid, oxidised NAD^{+}, and water.

The enzyme is a flavin-containing monooxygenase that uses molecular oxygen as oxidant and incorporates one of its atoms into the starting material. The systematic name of this enzyme class is 3-hydroxybenzoate,NADH:oxygen oxidoreductase (6-hydroxylating). Other names in common use include 3-hydroxybenzoate 6-hydroxylase, m-hydroxybenzoate 6-hydroxylase, and 3-hydroxybenzoic acid-6-hydroxylase. It participates in benzoate degradation via hydroxylation and uses flavin adenine dinucleotide as a cofactor.
