= C15H12O3 =

The chemical formula C_{15}H_{12}O_{3} (molar mass : 240.25 g/mol, exact mass 240.078644 u) may refer to:

- Plicatol B
- 4'-Hydroxyflavanone
