= 1,4-dihydroxy-2-naphthoyl-CoA hydrolase =

Class of enzymes

Identifiers
- EC no.: 3.1.2.28

Databases
- BRENDA: enzyme data
- ExPASy: NiceZyme view
- KEGG: enzyme entry
- MetaCyc: metabolic pathway
- Rhea: reactions
- PDB structures: RCSB PDB PDBe PDBsum
Search
- PMC: articles
- PubMed: articles
- NCBI: proteins

The enzyme 1,4-dihydroxy-2-naphthoyl-CoA hydrolase (EC 3.1.2.28; systematic name 1,4-dihydroxy-2-naphthoyl-CoA hydrolase) catalyses the following reaction:

1,4-dihydroxy-
2-naphthoyl-CoA
H_{2}O
coenzyme A
+
(1)

The enzyme characterised from plants including Rubia tinctorum hydrolyses 1,4-dihydroxy-2-naphthoyl-CoA to coenzyme A and 1,4-dihydroxy-2-naphthoic acid (1), which form the thioester in the starting material.

This enzyme participates in the biosynthesis of juglone, phylloquinone, and several plant pigments. Its structure contains a HotDog domain.
