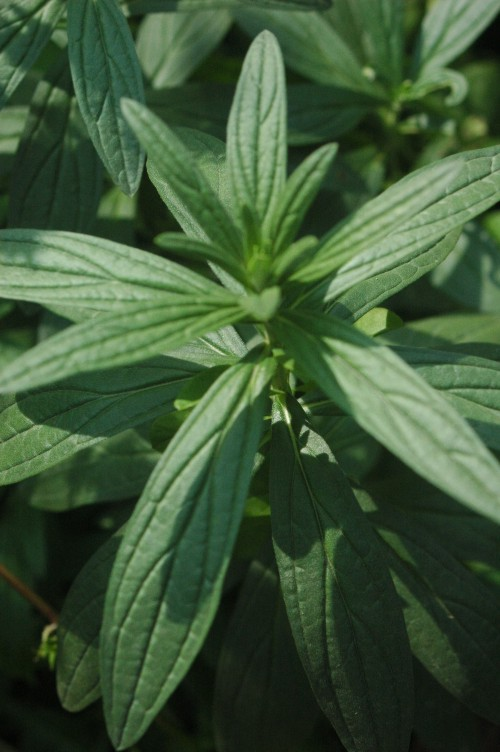
- Leaves

Scientific classification
- Kingdom: Plantae
- Clade: Embryophytes
- Clade: Tracheophytes
- Clade: Spermatophytes
- Clade: Angiosperms
- Clade: Eudicots
- Clade: Asterids
- Order: Boraginales
- Family: Boraginaceae
- Genus: Lithospermum
- Species: L. erythrorhizon

Binomial name
- Lithospermum erythrorhizon Siebold & Zucc. 1846

= Lithospermum erythrorhizon =

Species of flowering plant in the borage family

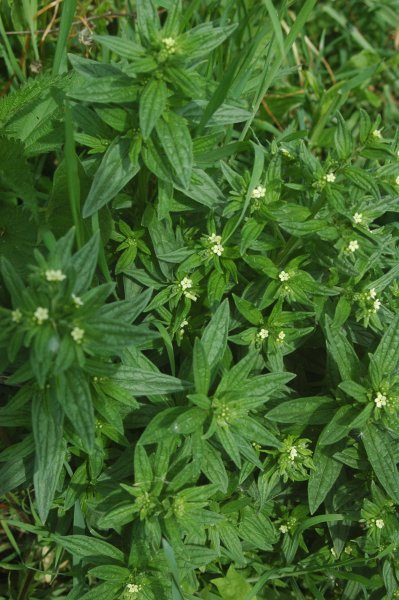
Lithospermum erythrorhizon, with flowers

Lithospermum erythrorhizon, commonly called purple gromwell, red stoneroot, red gromwell, red-root gromwell and redroot lithospermum, is a plant species in the family Boraginaceae. It is called zǐcǎo (紫草) in Chinese, jichi (지치) in Korean, and murasaki (ムラサキ; 茈, 紫) in Japanese.

The dried root of Lithospermum erythrorhizon (lithospermum root or Lithospermi Radix) is a Chinese herbal medicine with various antiviral and biological activities, including inhibition of human immunodeficiency virus type 1 (HIV-1).

The genome of Lithospermum erythrorhizon has been sequenced and has facilitated the discovery of a putative retrotransposition-derived duplication event that produced a 4-hydroxybenzoate geranyltransferase gene involved in alkannin biosynthesis.

== Biochemistry ==
The enzyme 4-hydroxybenzoate geranyltransferase utilizes geranyl diphosphate and 4-hydroxybenzoate to produce 3-geranyl-4-hydroxybenzoate and diphosphate. Biosynthetically, alkannin is produced in plants from the intermediates 4-hydroxybenzoic acid and geranyl pyrophosphate. This enzyme is involved in shikonin biosynthesis.

The enzyme geranylhydroquinone 3''-hydroxylase uses geranylhydroquinone, NADPH, H^{+} and O_{2} to produce 3-hydroxygeranylhydroquinone, NADP^{+} and H_{2}O.

== Uses ==
It has been cultivated in Japan since the Nara period for its root, which can be used for herbal medicine and to make dyes.

Before the introduction of synthetic dyes to Meiji period Japan, the roots were commonly used as a dyestuff for luxury textiles, typically high-end kimono and obi. The process of extracting purple dyestuff from the roots was an exceedingly long, complex and time-consuming process, necessitating its relatively high expense:

The roots [of the plant] are collected and dried for two to three months to mature the color. While this occurs, the silk is pre-mordanted [...] the mordanting process involves repeated immersion of the cloth or yarn in the alum bath and drying over a two- or three-month period. To prepare the dyestuff, the gromwell roots are softened overnight in 60° [Celsius] water and then pounded to release the dye. The silk is then repeatedly immersed in the bath, aired to allow more oxygen to penetrate the cloth and then steeped in the dye until the desired color is achieved. When the dyeing is completed the cloth is placed in dark storage for as long as a year while the color continues to mature.

For a deep purple, up to 50 dips could be needed. Shikonzome dye loses colour remarkably fast, literally as the fibers are being dipped, meaning it was often used for bokashi (ombré) dying, and the resulting colour was varied and uneven, with each strand a slightly different shade.

One Japanese word for the plant, murasaki (紫), inspired the pen name "Lady Murasaki" for the author of The Tale of Genji and is also the source of the general Japanese term for the color purple, murasaki iro (紫色). Additional terms were used for specific shades of purple within this range, particularly during the Heian period; names such as usuki murasaki ("pale purple") and asaki murasaki ("light purple") formed important distinctions when dressing in specifically-layered clothing, and could also indicate (typically high) rank.

The dyes made from its root also had other names, such as shikon (紫根) shikon (紫根), but all of them were difficult to work with because of their requirement for an alum-rich mordant and the resulting colors' extreme vulnerability to photobleaching. During the Heian Period, sumptuary laws restricted murasaki-dyed clothing to the Empress and her ladies in waiting.

== See also ==
- List of kampo herbs
