= Aminobenzoate decarboxylase =

Class of enzymes

Identifiers
- EC no.: 4.1.1.24
- CAS no.: 9024-73-1

Databases
- BRENDA: enzyme data
- ExPASy: NiceZyme view
- KEGG: enzyme entry
- MetaCyc: metabolic pathway
- Rhea: reactions
- PDB structures: RCSB PDB PDBe PDBsum
- Gene Ontology: AmiGO / QuickGO
Search
- PMC: articles
- PubMed: articles
- NCBI: proteins

Aminobenzoate decarboxylase (EC 4.1.1.24) is an enzyme characterised from Escherichia coli that catalyzes the decarboxylation of 4-aminobenzoic acid to aniline and carbon dioxide:

4-aminobenzoic acid
CO_{2}
aniline

The enzyme also gives aniline from anthranilic acid. In 2026, it was suggested that the activity ascribed to this enzyme should instead be assigned to 4-hydroxybenzoate decarboxylase.

This enzyme belongs to the family of lyases, specifically the carboxy-lyases, which cleave carbon-carbon bonds. The systematic name of this enzyme class is aminobenzoate carboxy-lyase (aniline-forming). It employs one cofactor, pyridoxal phosphate.
