= 3-hydroxybenzoate 2-monooxygenase =

Class of enzymes

Identifiers
- EC no.: 1.14.99.23
- CAS no.: 73507-96-7

Databases
- IntEnz: IntEnz view
- BRENDA: BRENDA entry
- ExPASy: NiceZyme view
- KEGG: KEGG entry
- MetaCyc: metabolic pathway
- PRIAM: profile
- PDB structures: RCSB PDB PDBe PDBsum
- Gene Ontology: AmiGO / QuickGO
Search
- PMC: articles
- PubMed: articles
- NCBI: proteins

3-hydroxybenzoate 2-monooxygenase (EC 1.14.99.23) is an enzyme that catalyzes the chemical reaction

3-Hydroxybenzoic acid
+ reduced
acceptor
O_{2}
H_{2}O
2,3-Dihydroxybenzoic acid
+ electron
acceptor

The three substrates of this enzyme are 3-hydroxybenzoic acid, a reduced electron acceptor, and oxygen. Its products are 2,3-dihydroxybenzoic acid, the oxidised acceptor, and water.

This enzyme is an oxidoreductase, that uses molecular oxygen as oxidant. The systematic name of this enzyme class is 3-hydroxybenzoate,hydrogen-donor:oxygen oxidoreductase (2-hydroxylating). Other names in common use include 3-hydroxybenzoate 2-hydroxylase, and 3-HBA-2-hydroxylase.
