= 4-methoxybenzoate monooxygenase (O-demethylating) =

Class of enzymes

Identifiers
- EC no.: 1.14.99.15
- CAS no.: 37256-78-3

Databases
- IntEnz: IntEnz view
- BRENDA: BRENDA entry
- ExPASy: NiceZyme view
- KEGG: KEGG entry
- MetaCyc: metabolic pathway
- PRIAM: profile
- PDB structures: RCSB PDB PDBe PDBsum
- Gene Ontology: AmiGO / QuickGO
Search
- PMC: articles
- PubMed: articles
- NCBI: proteins

4-methoxybenzoate monooxygenase (O-demethylating) (EC 1.14.99.15) is an enzyme that catalyzes a chemical reaction that removes the methyl group in p-anisic acid, giving a phenol, 4-hydroxybenzoic acid. It was characterised from Pseudomonas putida.

p-Anisic acid
+ reduced
acceptor
O_{2}
H_{2}O
4-Hydroxybenzoic acid
+ H_{2}C=O + electron acceptor

The methyl group is oxidised to formaldehyde. The enzyme is an oxidoreductase that uses molecular oxygen and an unknown electron acceptor. It is a flavoprotein that has flavin adenine dinucleotide as a cofactor. The systematic name of this enzyme class is 4-methoxybenzoate,hydrogen-donor:oxygen oxidoreductase (O-demethylating). Other names in common use include 4-methoxybenzoate 4-monooxygenase (O-demethylating), 4-methoxybenzoate O-demethylase, p-anisic O-demethylase, and piperonylate-4-O-demethylase.
