= Purple gromwell =

Purple gromwell is a common name for several plants and may refer to:

- Lithospermum erythrorhizon, native to eastern Asia
- Lithospermum purpurocaeruleum, native to Europe and western Asia
