= Methyl anisate =

Names
- Preferred IUPAC name Methyl 4-methoxybenzoate
- Other names p-Anisic acid methyl ester; 4-(Methoxycarbonyl)anisole; 4-Methoxybenzoic acid methyl ester; Methyl p-anisate; Methyl p-methoxybenzoate; p-Methoxybenzoic acid methyl ester

Identifiers
CAS Number	121-98-2
3D model (JSmol)	Interactive image
ChEBI	CHEBI:86903
ChEMBL	ChEMBL1762668
ChemSpider	21108577
ECHA InfoCard	100.004.104
EC Number	204-513-2
PubChem CID	8499
UNII	2MFL7873W9
CompTox Dashboard (EPA)	DTXSID7047645
- InChI: InChI=1S/C9H10O3/c1-11-8-5-3-7(4-6-8)9(10)12-2/h3-6H,1-2H3 Key: DDIZAANNODHTRB-UHFFFAOYSA-N; InChI=1/C9H10O3/c1-11-8-5-3-7(4-6-8)9(10)12-2/h3-6H,1-2H3 Key: DDIZAANNODHTRB-UHFFFAOYAF
- SMILES: O=C(OC)c1ccc(OC)cc1

Properties
Chemical formula	C_{9}H_{10}O_{3}
Molar mass	166.176 g·mol^{−1}
Melting point	48 to 51 °C (118 to 124 °F; 321 to 324 K)
Boiling point	244 to 245 °C (471 to 473 °F; 517 to 518 K)
Magnetic susceptibility (χ)	−98.6·10^{−6} cm^{3}/mol
- Except where otherwise noted, data are given for materials in their standard state (at 25 °C [77 °F], 100 kPa). Infobox references

Methyl anisate is the methyl ester of p-anisic acid. It is found in star anise.

It is an organic compound commonly used within the food industry. It is also commonly employed as a fragrance for certain perfumes. This compound can be synthesized directly through the condensation of methanol and 4-methoxybenzoic acid or PHBA. Its characteristic odor is similar to that of feijoa tree fruits, a flowery odor.
