= Carboxymethylenebutenolidase =

Class of enzymes

carboxymethylenebutenolidase

Identifiers
- EC no.: 3.1.1.45
- CAS no.: 76689-22-0

Databases
- BRENDA: enzyme data
- ExPASy: NiceZyme view
- KEGG: enzyme entry
- MetaCyc: metabolic pathway
- Rhea: reactions
- PDB structures: RCSB PDB PDBe PDBsum
- Gene Ontology: AmiGO / QuickGO
Search
- PMC: articles
- PubMed: articles
- NCBI: proteins

Carboxymethylenebutenolidase (EC 3.1.1.45, also known as CMBL and dienelactone hydrolase) is an enzyme that catalyzes the chemical reaction

cis-4-carboxymethylenebut-2-en-4-olide
H_{2}O
maleylacetic acid

The enzyme characterised from Pseudomonas species hydrolyses cis-4-carboxymethylenebut-2-en-4-olide to maleylacetic acid. This is a step in the breakdown of 3-chlorobenzoic acid in this bacteria. A similar enzyme has been found in humans. It is also present in leafcutter ant fungal gardens.

This enzyme is a hydrolase, specifically one acting on carboxylic ester bonds. The systematic name of this enzyme class is 4-carboxymethylenebut-2-en-4-olide lactonohydrolase. Other names in use include maleylacetate enol-lactonase, dienelactone hydrolase, and carboxymethylene butenolide hydrolase.

== Structural studies ==
As of late 2007, 10 structures have been solved for this class of enzymes, with PDB accession codes 1DIN, 1GGV, 1ZI6, 1ZI8, 1ZI9, 1ZIC, 1ZIX, 1ZIY, 1ZJ4, and 1ZJ5.
