= 4-hydroxybenzoate—CoA ligase =

Class of enzymes

4-Hydroxybenzoate—CoA ligase

Identifiers
- EC no.: 6.2.1.27
- CAS no.: 119699-80-8

Databases
- IntEnz: IntEnz view
- BRENDA: BRENDA entry
- ExPASy: NiceZyme view
- KEGG: KEGG entry
- MetaCyc: metabolic pathway
- PRIAM: profile
- PDB structures: RCSB PDB PDBe PDBsum
- Gene Ontology: AmiGO / QuickGO
Search
- PMC: articles
- PubMed: articles
- NCBI: proteins

In enzymology, a 4-hydroxybenzoate—CoA ligase (EC 6.2.1.27) is an enzyme that catalyzes the chemical reaction

ATP + 4-hydroxybenzoate + CoA $\rightleftharpoons$ AMP + diphosphate + 4-hydroxybenzoyl-CoA

The 3 substrates of this enzyme are ATP, 4-hydroxybenzoate, and CoA, whereas its 3 products are AMP, diphosphate, and 4-hydroxybenzoyl-CoA.

This enzyme belongs to the family of ligases, specifically those forming carbon-sulfur bonds as acid-thiol ligases. The systematic name of this enzyme class is 4-hydroxybenzoate:CoA ligase (AMP-forming). Other names in common use include 4-hydroxybenzoate-CoA synthetase, 4-hydroxybenzoate-coenzyme A ligase (AMP-forming), 4-hydroxybenzoyl coenzyme A synthetase, and 4-hydroxybenzoyl-CoA ligase. This enzyme participates in benzoate degradation via coa ligation.
