= C14H28O2 =

The molecular formula C_{14}H_{28}O_{2} (molar mass: 228.37 g/mol) may refer to:

- Dodecyl acetate, the dodecyl ester of acetic acid
- Myristic acid, a common saturated fatty acid
