= 2,4-Dichlorobenzoyl-CoA reductase =

Class of enzymes

2,4-dichlorobenzoyl-CoA reductase

Identifiers
- EC no.: 1.3.1.63

Databases
- IntEnz: IntEnz view
- BRENDA: BRENDA entry
- ExPASy: NiceZyme view
- KEGG: KEGG entry
- MetaCyc: metabolic pathway
- PRIAM: profile
- PDB structures: RCSB PDB PDBe PDBsum
- Gene Ontology: AmiGO / QuickGO
Search
- PMC: articles
- PubMed: articles
- NCBI: proteins

In enzymology, a 2,4-dichlorobenzoyl-CoA reductase (EC 1.3.1.63) is an enzyme that catalyzes the chemical reaction

4-chlorobenzoyl-CoA + NADP^{+} + HCl $\rightleftharpoons$ 2,4-dichlorobenzoyl-CoA + NADPH + H^{+}

The 3 substrates of this enzyme are 4-chlorobenzoyl-CoA, NADP^{+}, and HCl, whereas its 3 products are 2,4-dichlorobenzoyl-CoA (the thioester of 2,4-dichlorobenzoic acid), NADPH, and H^{+}.

This enzyme belongs to the family of oxidoreductases, specifically those acting on the CH-CH group of donor with NAD+ or NADP+ as acceptor. The systematic name of this enzyme class is 4-chlorobenzoyl-CoA:NADP+ oxidoreductase (halogenating). This enzyme participates in degradation of 2,4-dichlorobenzoate.
