= 2,4-Dichlorobenzoic acid =

Names
- Preferred IUPAC name 2,4-Dichlorobenzoic acid

Identifiers
| CAS Number | 50-84-0 |
| 3D model (JSmol) | Interactive image |
| ChEBI | CHEBI:30748 |
| ChEMBL | ChEMBL1492029 |
| ChemSpider | 5583 |
| ECHA InfoCard | 100.000.062 |
| EC Number | 200-067-8 |
| Gmelin Reference | 562565 |
| KEGG | C06670 |
| PubChem CID | 5787 |
| UNII | 0SR0320D45 |
| CompTox Dashboard (EPA) | DTXSID0024977 |
- InChI: InChI=1S/C7H4Cl2O2/c8-4-1-2-5(7(10)11)6(9)3-4/h1-3H,(H,10,11) Key: ATCRIUVQKHMXSH-UHFFFAOYSA-N
- SMILES: C1=CC(=C(C=C1Cl)Cl)C(=O)O

Properties
| Chemical formula | C_{7}H_{4}Cl_{2}O_{2} |
| Molar mass | 191.01 g·mol^{−1} |
| Appearance | white solid |
| Melting point | 164 °C (327 °F; 437 K) |

Hazards
- GHS labelling
| Pictograms | (GHS07: Exclamation mark) |
| Signal word | Warning |
| Hazard statements | H302, H315, H319, H335 |
| Precautionary statements | P261, P264, P264+P265, P270, P271, P280, P301+P317, P302+P352, P304+P340, P305+P351+P338, P319, P321, P330, P332+P317, P337+P317, P362+P364, P403+P233, P405, P501 |
- Except where otherwise noted, data are given for materials in their standard state (at 25 °C [77 °F], 100 kPa). Infobox references

2,4-Dichlorobenzoic acid is an organic compound with the formula C_{6}H_{3}Cl_{2}CO_{2}H. It is one of more important of several isomers of dichlorobenzoic acid. It can be prepared by oxidation of 2,4-dichlorotoluene. The coenzyme A thioester of 2,4-dichlorobenzoic acid is the substrate for 2,4-dichlorobenzoyl reductase.

== Applications ==
2,4-Dichlorobenzoic acid has a role to play in the production of the following agents: Lobenzarit, Furosemide, Mepacrine (page 572), M-12325. TO-115 [82050-51-9]
