= 4-hydroxybenzoate polyprenyltransferase =

Class of enzymes

Identifiers
- EC no.: 2.5.1.39
- CAS no.: 9030-77-7

Databases
- IntEnz: IntEnz view
- BRENDA: BRENDA entry
- ExPASy: NiceZyme view
- KEGG: KEGG entry
- MetaCyc: metabolic pathway
- PRIAM: profile
- PDB structures: RCSB PDB PDBe PDBsum
- Gene Ontology: AmiGO / QuickGO
Search
- PMC: articles
- PubMed: articles
- NCBI: proteins

In enzymology, a 4-hydroxybenzoate polyprenyltransferase (EC 2.5.1.39) is an enzyme that catalyzes the chemical reaction

a polyprenyl diphosphate + 4-hydroxybenzoate $\rightleftharpoons$ diphosphate + a 4-hydroxy-3-polyprenylbenzoate

Thus, the two substrates of this enzyme are a polyprenyl diphosphate and 4-hydroxybenzoate, whereas its two products are diphosphate and 4-hydroxy-3-polyprenylbenzoate.

This enzyme belongs to the family of transferases, specifically those transferring aryl or alkyl groups other than methyl groups. This enzyme participates in ubiquinone biosynthesis.

== Nomenclature ==
The systematic name of this enzyme class is polyprenyl-diphosphate:4-hydroxybenzoate polyprenyltransferase. Other names in common use include:

- nonaprenyl-4-hydroxybenzoate transferase,
- 4-hydroxybenzoate transferase,
- p-hydroxybenzoate dimethylallyltransferase,
- p-hydroxybenzoate polyprenyltransferase,
- p-hydroxybenzoic acid-polyprenyl transferase,
- p-hydroxybenzoic-polyprenyl transferase, and
- 4-hydroxybenzoate nonaprenyltransferase
