= 4'-Hydroxyflavanone =

Names
- IUPAC name 4′-Hydroxyflavan-4-one
- Systematic IUPAC name 2-(4-Hydroxyphenyl)-2,3-dihydro-4H-1-benzopyran-4-one
- Other names: 2-(4-Hydroxyphenyl)chroman-4-one; 4-Hydroxyflavanone; 2,3-Dihydro-2-(4-hydroxyphenyl)-4H-1-benzopyran-4-one

Identifiers
CAS Number	6515-37-3
3D model (JSmol)	Interactive image
Beilstein Reference	384424
ChEBI	CHEBI:34361
ChEMBL	ChEMBL73933
ChemSpider	145054
DrugBank	DB04429
EC Number	676-790-1
KEGG	C14241
PubChem CID	165506
UNII	5K6L8O868Y
CompTox Dashboard (EPA)	DTXSID5022487
- InChI: InChI=1S/C15H12O3/c16-11-7-5-10(6-8-11)15-9-13(17)12-3-1-2-4-14(12)18-15/h1-8,15-16H,9H2 Key: ZLHVIYHWWQYJID-UHFFFAOYSA-N
- SMILES: C1C(OC2=CC=CC=C2C1=O)C3=CC=C(C=C3)O

Properties
Chemical formula	C_{15}H_{12}O_{3}
Molar mass	240.258 g·mol^{−1}

Hazards
- GHS labelling
Pictograms	(GHS07: Exclamation mark)
Signal word	Warning
Hazard statements	H315, H319, H335
Precautionary statements	P261, P264, P264+P265, P271, P280, P302+P352, P304+P340, P305+P351+P338, P319, P321, P332+P317, P337+P317, P362+P364, P403+P233, P405, P501
- Except where otherwise noted, data are given for materials in their standard state (at 25 °C [77 °F], 100 kPa). Infobox references

4'-Hydroxyflavanone is a naturally occurring monohydroxybenzoic acid and a member of the 4'-hydroxyflavanones family. It is white to pale orange in color and generally soluble in organic solvents such as chloroform and ethanol, but insoluble with water. 4'-Hydroxyflavanone is a naturally occurring product with cosmetic and potential clinical applications that is found in plants such as carnations (Dianthus caryophyllus).

== Natural occurrence ==
As part of the flavanone family, 4'-hydroxyflavanone can be found naturally in celery, red peppers, citrus fruits, parsley (Petroselinum crispum), berries, tea, and onions (Allium cepa L.).

== Applications ==
=== Cosmetic ===
Flavanone, with its orange-like color, has been used in natural dyes for cotton fabrics. Additionally, flavanone is used in various anti-wrinkle cosmetics and skin care products to treat psoriasis, melanogenesis, and photo-aging.

=== Clinical research ===
4'-Hydroxyflavanone is an inhibitor of SREBP, transcription factors that control the expression of a range of enzymes that regulate lipid homeostasis.

Research also suggests that 4'-hydroxyflavanones have potential pharmaceutic applications against fatty liver disease, hepatic steatosis, and dyslipidemia.

Flavanones are widely considered to be beneficial to human health as a result of their ability to control free radicals in the body. Flavanones deriving from citrus fruits in particular exhibit antioxidant, anti-inflammatory, blood lipid-lowering and cholesterol-lowering agents.

In general, flavonoids have been used extensively as anticancer, antimicrobial, antiviral, antiangiogenic, antimalarial, antioxidant, neuroprotective, antitumor, and anti-proliferative agents. Extracts that were rich in flavonoids have also been demonstrated to be ACE inhibitors in vitro, therefore acting as effective antihypertensive agents. They also have been shown to prevent cardio-metabolic disorders and preserve cognitive performance with aging.

== Toxicity ==
4'-Hydroxyflavanone is classified as an irritant due to its ability to cause skin corrosion, eye damage, and respiratory tract irritation if unprotected exposure occurs.
