= International nonproprietary name =

Official generic name for a pharmaceutical drug or active ingredient

An international nonproprietary name (INN) is an official generic and nonproprietary name given to a pharmaceutical substance or an active ingredient, encompassing compounds, peptides and low-molecular-weight proteins (e.g., insulin, hormones, cytokines), as well as complex biological products, such as those used for gene therapy. INNs are intended to make communication more precise by providing a unique standard name for each active ingredient, to avoid prescribing errors. The INN system was initiated by the World Health Organization (WHO) in 1953.

Having unambiguous standard names for each pharmaceutical substance (standardization of drug nomenclature) is important because a drug may be sold under many different brand names, or a branded medication may contain more than one drug. For example, the branded medications Celexa, Celapram and Citrol all contain the same active ingredient whose INN is citalopram. The antibacterial medication known as co-trimoxazole as well as those under the brand names Bactrim and Septran all contain two active ingredients easily recognisable by their INN: trimethoprim and sulfamethoxazole.

The WHO publishes INNs in English, Latin, French, Russian, Spanish, Arabic, and Chinese, and a drug's INNs are often cognate across most or all of the languages, with minor spelling or pronunciation differences, for example: paracetamol (en) paracetamolum (la), paracétamol (fr) and парацетамол (ru). An established INN is known as a recommended INN (rINN), while a name that is still being considered is called a proposed INN (pINN).

National nonproprietary names such as British Approved Names (BAN), Dénominations Communes Françaises (DCF), Japanese Adopted Names (JAN) and United States Adopted Names (USAN) are nowadays, with rare exceptions, identical to the INN.

Mandate The World Health Organization has a constitutional mandate to "develop, establish and promote international standards with respect to biological, pharmaceutical and similar products". The World Health Organization collaborates closely with INN experts and national nomenclature committees to select a single name of worldwide acceptability for each active substance that is to be marketed as a pharmaceutical. To avoid confusion, which could jeopardize the safety of patients, trade-marks should neither be derived from INNs nor contain common stems used in INNs.

— WHO

== INN stems ==
Each drug's INN is unique but may contain a stem that is shared with other drugs of the same class. In this context, a stem is a syllable (or syllables) created to evoke in the name the pharmacological mechanism of action or the chemical structure of the substance. Stems are mostly placed word-finally (suffixes), but in some cases word-initial stems (prefixes) are used. For example, the beta blocker drugs propranolol and atenolol share the stem -olol (as a suffix), and the benzodiazepine drugs lorazepam and diazepam share the stem -azepam (also a suffix) The list of stems in use are collected in a publication informally known as the Stem Book.

Some examples of stems are:

- -anib for angiogenesis inhibitors (e.g., pazopanib)
- -anserin for serotonin receptor antagonists, especially 5-HT_{2} antagonists (e.g., ritanserin and mianserin)
- -arit for antiarthritic agents (e.g., lobenzarit)
- -ase for enzymes (e.g., alteplase)
- -azepam or -azolam for benzodiazepines (e.g., diazepam and alprazolam)
- -caine for local anaesthetics (e.g., procaine)
- cef- for cephalosporins (e.g., cefalexin)
- -coxib for COX-2 inhibitors, a type of anti-inflammatory drugs (e.g., celecoxib)
- -grel- or -grel for platelet aggregation inhibitors (e.g., anagrelide, cangrelor, clopidogrel)
- -mab for monoclonal antibodies (e.g., infliximab); see Nomenclature of monoclonal antibodies
- -meran for messenger RNA products (e.g., tozinameran and elasomeran)
- -nab- or nab- for cannabinoid receptor agonists (e.g., cannabidiol, dronabinol, nabilone)
- -olol for beta blockers (e.g., atenolol)
- -pril for angiotensin converting enzyme (ACE) inhibitors (e.g., captopril)
- -sartan for angiotensin II receptor antagonists (e.g., losartan)
- -tinib for tyrosine kinase inhibitors (e.g., imatinib)
- -vastatin for HMG-CoA reductase inhibitors, a group of cholesterol-lowering agents (e.g., atorvastatin and simvastatin)
- -vir for antivirals (e.g., remdesivir and ritonavir)
  - -navir for antiretroviral protease inhibitors (e.g., darunavir)
  - -ciclovir for bicyclic heterocycle antivirals (e.g., aciclovir and famciclovir)

== Linguistics ==
=== Stems and roots ===
The term stem is not used consistently in linguistics. It has been defined as a form to which affixes (of any type) can be attached. Under a different and apparently more common view, this is the definition of a root, while a stem consists of the root plus optional derivational affixes, meaning that it is the part of a word to which inflectional affixes are added. INN stems employ the first definition, while under the more common alternative they would be described as roots.

=== Translingual communication ===
Pharmacology and pharmacotherapy (like health care generally) are universally relevant around the world, making translingual communication about them an important goal. An interlingual perspective is thus useful in drug nomenclature. The WHO issues INNs in English, Latin, French, Russian, Spanish, Arabic, and Chinese. A drug's INNs are often cognates across most or all of the languages, but they also allow small inflectional, diacritic, and transliterational differences that are usually transparent and trivial for nonspeakers (as is true of most international scientific vocabulary). For example, although ibuprofenum (la) has an inflectional difference from ibuprofen (en), and although ibuprofène (fr) has a diacritic difference, the differences are trivial; users can easily recognize the "same word". Although Ибупрофе́н (ru) and ibuprofen (en) have a transliteration difference, they sound similar, and for Russian speakers who can recognize Latin script or English speakers who can recognize Cyrillic script, they look similar; users can recognize the "same word". Thus, INNs make medicines bought anywhere in the world as easily identifiable as possible to people who do not speak that language. Notably, the "same word" principle allows health professionals and patients who do not speak the same language to communicate to some degree and to avoid potentially life-threatening confusions from drug interactions.

=== Spelling regularization ===
To facilitate the translation and pronunciation of INN, "f" should be used instead of "ph", "t" instead of "th", "e" instead of "ae" or "oe", and "i" instead of "y"; the use of the letters "h" and "k" should be avoided. Thus a predictable spelling system, approximating phonemic orthography, is used, as follows:

- ae or oe is replaced by e (e.g. estradiol vs. oestradiol)
- ph is replaced by f (e.g. amfetamine vs. amphetamine)
- th is replaced by t (e.g. levmetamfetamine vs. levo-methamphetamine)
- y is replaced by i (e.g. aciclovir vs. acyclovir)
- h and k are avoided where possible

== Names for radicals and groups (salts, esters, and so on) ==
Many drugs are supplied as salts, with a cation and an anion. The way the INN system handles these is explained by the WHO at its "Guidance on INN" webpage. For example, amfetamine and oxacillin are INNs, whereas various salts of these compounds – e.g., amfetamine sulfate and oxacillin sodium – are modified INNs (INNM).

== Comparison of naming standards ==
Several countries had created their own nonproprietary naming system before the INN was created, and in many cases, the names created under the old systems continue to be used in those countries. As one example, in English the INN name for a common painkiller is paracetamol; the table below gives the alternative names for this in different systems:

International Nonproprietary Name (INN)	paracetamol (en); paracetamolum (la); paracétamol (fr); paracetamol (es); парацетамол (ru); باراسيتامول (ar); 对乙酰氨基酚 (zh)
Australian Approved Name (AAN)	paracetamol
British Approved Name (BAN)	paracetamol
Chinese Approved Drug Name (CADN)	对乙酰氨基酚 (zh)
United States Adopted Name (USAN); United States Pharmacopeia (USP)	acetaminophen
Japanese Accepted Name (JAN); Japanese Pharmacopoeia (JP)	アセトアミノフェン (jp) acetaminophen (en)
Other generic names	N-acetyl-p-aminophenol; APAP; p-acetamidophenol; acetamol; etc.
Proprietary names	Tylenol; Panadol; Panodil; Panamax; Perdolan; Calpol; Doliprane; Tachipirina; Ben-u-ron; Atasol; Adol; Pamol; Gelocatil; etc.
IUPAC name	N-(4-hydroxyphenyl)acetamide
ATC code	N02BE01

Other naming systems not listed above include France's Dénomination Commune Française (DCF) and Italy's Denominazione Comune Italiana (DCIT).

== School of INN ==
The School of INN is a WHO International Nonproprietary Name Programme initiative launched in 2019, which aims to provide information to pharmacy, medical and health students, as well as health professionals and other stakeholders on how an INN is designed and constructed. Users can take self-administered courses using its free online learning platform.

== See also ==
- Generic drug
