= 4-Hydroxybenzoic acid 4-O-glucoside =

Names
- IUPAC name 4-(β-D-Glucopyranosyloxy)benzoic acid
- Systematic IUPAC name 4-{[(2S,3R,4S,5S,6R)-3,4,5-Trihydroxy-6-(hydroxymethyl)oxan-2-yl]oxy}benzoic acid
- Other names p-Hydroxybenzoic acid glucoside 4-Hydroxybenzoate-O-glucoside

Identifiers
CAS Number	15397-25-8
3D model (JSmol)	Interactive image
ChEBI	CHEBI:16741
ChemSpider	389174
KEGG	C03993
PubChem CID	440186
CompTox Dashboard (EPA)	DTXSID601031606
- InChI: InChI=1S/C13H16O8/c14-5-8-9(15)10(16)11(17)13(21-8)20-7-3-1-6(2-4-7)12(18)19/h1-4,8-11,13-17H,5H2,(H,18,19)/t8-,9-,10+,11-,13-/m1/s1 Key: XSSDYIMYZONMBL-BZNQNGANSA-N
- SMILES: C1=CC(=CC=C1C(=O)O)O[C@H]2[C@@H]([C@H]([C@@H]([C@H](O2)CO)O)O)O

Properties
Chemical formula	C_{13}H_{16}O_{8}
Molar mass	300.263 g·mol^{−1}
- Except where otherwise noted, data are given for materials in their standard state (at 25 °C [77 °F], 100 kPa). Infobox references

4-Hydroxybenzoic acid 4-O-glucoside is a glucoside of p-hydroxybenzoic acid. It can be found in mycorrhizal (Picea abies-Lactarius deterrimus and Picea abies-Laccaria amethystina) and non-mycorrhizal roots of Norway spruces (Picea abies).

== Biosynthesis ==
The enzyme 4-hydroxybenzoate 4-O-beta-D-glucosyltransferase, which is found in the pollen of Pinus densiflora, adds a glucose unit from UDP-glucose to 4-hydroxybenzoic acid and gives the 4-O-glucoside.

4-Hydroxybenzoic acid
+ UDP-glucose
UDP
4-Hydroxybenzoic acid 4-O-glucoside
