= 3-hydroxybenzoate—CoA ligase =

Class of enzymes

3-Hydroxybenzoate—CoA ligase

Identifiers
- EC no.: 6.2.1.37

Databases
- IntEnz: IntEnz view
- BRENDA: BRENDA entry
- ExPASy: NiceZyme view
- KEGG: KEGG entry
- MetaCyc: metabolic pathway
- PRIAM: profile
- PDB structures: RCSB PDB PDBe PDBsum
Search
- PMC: articles
- PubMed: articles
- NCBI: proteins

3-Hydroxybenzoate—CoA ligase (EC 6.2.1.37, 3-hydroxybenzoyl-CoA synthetase, 3-hydroxybenzoate-coenzyme A ligase (AMP-forming), 3-hydroxybenzoyl coenzyme A synthetase, 3-hydroxybenzoyl-CoA ligase) is an enzyme with systematic name 3-hydroxybenzoate:CoA ligase (AMP-forming). This enzyme catalyses the following chemical reaction

ATP + 3-hydroxybenzoate + CoA $\rightleftharpoons$ AMP + diphosphate + 3-hydroxybenzoyl-CoA

The enzyme works equally well with 4-hydroxybenzoate.
