= 4-hydroxybenzoate 4-O-beta-D-glucosyltransferase =

Class of enzymes

Identifiers
- EC no.: 2.4.1.194
- CAS no.: 120860-68-6

Databases
- IntEnz: IntEnz view
- BRENDA: BRENDA entry
- ExPASy: NiceZyme view
- KEGG: KEGG entry
- MetaCyc: metabolic pathway
- PRIAM: profile
- PDB structures: RCSB PDB PDBe PDBsum
- Gene Ontology: AmiGO / QuickGO
Search
- PMC: articles
- PubMed: articles
- NCBI: proteins

4-hydroxybenzoate 4-O-beta-D-glucosyltransferase (EC 2.4.1.194) is an enzyme that catalyzes the chemical reaction

4-Hydroxybenzoic acid
+ UDP-glucose
UDP
4-Hydroxybenzoic acid 4-O-glucoside

The two substrates of this enzyme characterised from Pinus densiflora are 4-hydroxybenzoic acid and UDP-glucose. Its products are 4-hydroxybenzoic acid 4-O-glucoside and uridine diphosphate (UDP).

This enzyme belongs to the family of glycosyltransferases, specifically the hexosyltransferases. The systematic name of this enzyme class is UDP-glucose:4-hydroxybenzoate 4-O-beta-D-glucosyltransferase. Other names in common use include uridine diphosphoglucose-4-hydroxybenzoate glucosyltransferase, UDP-glucose:4-(beta-D-glucopyranosyloxy)benzoic acid, glucosyltransferase, HBA glucosyltransferase, p-hydroxybenzoate glucosyltransferase, PHB glucosyltransferase, and PHB-O-glucosyltransferase.
