= 4-hydroxybenzoate 1-hydroxylase =

Class of enzymes

Identifiers
- EC no.: 1.14.13.64
- CAS no.: 134214-78-1

Databases
- BRENDA: enzyme data
- ExPASy: NiceZyme view
- KEGG: enzyme entry
- MetaCyc: metabolic pathway
- Rhea: reactions
- PDB structures: RCSB PDB PDBe PDBsum
- Gene Ontology: AmiGO / QuickGO
Search
- PMC: articles
- PubMed: articles
- NCBI: proteins

4-hydroxybenzoate 1-hydroxylase (EC 1.14.13.64) is an enzyme that catalyzes the chemical reaction

4-Hydroxybenzoic acid
+ NADH
O_{2} + H^{+}
H_{2}O
Hydroquinone
+ NAD^{+} + CO_{2}

The four substrates of this enzyme are 4-hydroxybenzoic acid, reduced nicotinamide adenine dinucleotide (NADH), oxygen, and a proton. Its products are hydroquinone, oxidised NAD^{+}, water, and carbon dioxide. Nicotinamide adenine dinucleotide phosphate can be used as an alternative cofactor.

This enzyme is a flavin-containing monooxygenase that uses molecular oxygen as oxidant and incorporates one of its atoms into the starting material. The systematic name of this enzyme class is 4-hydroxybenzoate,NAD(P)H:oxygen oxidoreductase (1-hydroxylating, decarboxylating). This enzyme is also called 4-hydroxybenzoate 1-monooxygenase. This enzyme participates in benzoic acid degradation.
