= Cabbage worm =

Four kinds of lepidopteran larvae

The term cabbage worm is primarily used for any of four kinds of lepidopteran larvae that feed on cabbages and other cole crops. Favorite foods include broccoli, cauliflower, Brussels sprouts, collards, kale, mustard greens, turnip greens, radishes, turnips, rutabagas and kohlrabi. This small group of similar pest species is known to agriculturists as the cabbage worm compte butterflies (family Pieridae, type genus Pieris, garden whites).

- The small white (P. rapae) is a small, common, cosmopolitan butterfly whose caterpillar has fine, short fuzz and is bright green; it prefers cabbage, broccoli and cauliflower. A larger Old World form (P. brassicae) is called large white. A common North American form (P. protodice) is known as the southern cabbage butterfly. The green-veined white (P. napi) occurs in Europe and North America.
- The cabbage looper (Trichoplusia ni) is a member of the moth family Noctuidae. The caterpillar is smooth and green with white stripes. It is called a "looper" because it arches its body as it crawls, inchworm style. This species is very destructive to plants due to its voracious consumption of leaves. It is not restricted to cole crops; other plant hosts include tomato, cucumber, and potato. The adult of the species is a nocturnal brown moth.
- The cabbage webworm (Hellula undalis) is a widely distributed webworm native to southern Europe or Asia that also injures cabbages and other vegetables in the Gulf states of the United States.
- The diamondback moth (Plutella xylostella or, in some literature known by the synonym P. maculipennis) is a member of the moth family Plutellidae. The caterpillar is smooth and solid green in color. When disturbed, it thrashes and drops off the plant. The newly emerged larva is a leaf miner, entering the tissues of the leaf and consuming the parenchyma between the two outer layers of the leaf. Larger larvae make holes through the leaf, consuming all the tissue. The adult of the species is a small, elongated gray moth with whitish spots on the forewings that form two diamond shapes when the moth is at rest. The diamondback moth is primarily a tropical species, but is migratory, reaching temperate zones in most years.
