= 2,4'-dihydroxyacetophenone dioxygenase =

Class of enzymes

Identifiers
- EC no.: 1.13.11.41
- CAS no.: 105503-64-8

Databases
- IntEnz: IntEnz view
- BRENDA: BRENDA entry
- ExPASy: NiceZyme view
- KEGG: KEGG entry
- MetaCyc: metabolic pathway
- PRIAM: profile
- PDB structures: RCSB PDB PDBe PDBsum
- Gene Ontology: AmiGO / QuickGO
Search
- PMC: articles
- PubMed: articles
- NCBI: proteins

2,4'-dihydroxyacetophenone dioxygenase (EC 1.13.11.41) is an enzyme that catalyzes the chemical reaction

2,4'-dihydroxyacetophenone
O_{2}
4-Hydroxybenzoic acid
+
formic acid

The two substrates of this enzyme are 2,4'-dihydroxyacetophenone and oxygen. Its products are 4-hydroxybenzoic acid and formic acid.

This enzyme belongs to the family of oxidoreductases, specifically those acting on single donors with O_{2} as oxidant and incorporation of two atoms of oxygen into the substrate (oxygenases). The oxygen incorporated need not be derived from O_{2}. The systematic name of this enzyme class is 2,4'-dihydroxyacetophenone oxidoreductase (C-C-bond-cleaving). This enzyme is also called (4-hydroxybenzoyl)methanol oxygenase. This enzyme participates in bisphenol a degradation.
