= Geranylhydroquinone 3''-hydroxylase =

Class of enzymes

Identifiers
- EC no.: 1.14.13.116

Databases
- IntEnz: IntEnz view
- BRENDA: BRENDA entry
- ExPASy: NiceZyme view
- KEGG: KEGG entry
- MetaCyc: metabolic pathway
- PRIAM: profile
- PDB structures: RCSB PDB PDBe PDBsum
Search
- PMC: articles
- PubMed: articles
- NCBI: proteins

Geranylhydroquinone 3''-hydroxylase (EC 1.14.13.116, GHQ 3''-hydroxylase) is an enzyme with systematic name geranylhydroquinone,NADPH:oxygen oxidoreductase (3''-hydroxylating). This enzyme catalyses the following chemical reaction

geranylhydroquinone + NADPH + H^{+} + O_{2} $\rightleftharpoons$ 3''-hydroxygeranylhydroquinone + NADP^{+} + H_{2}O

Geranylhydroquinone 3''-hydroxylase contains cytochrome P450.
