= Lobenzarit =

Chemical compound

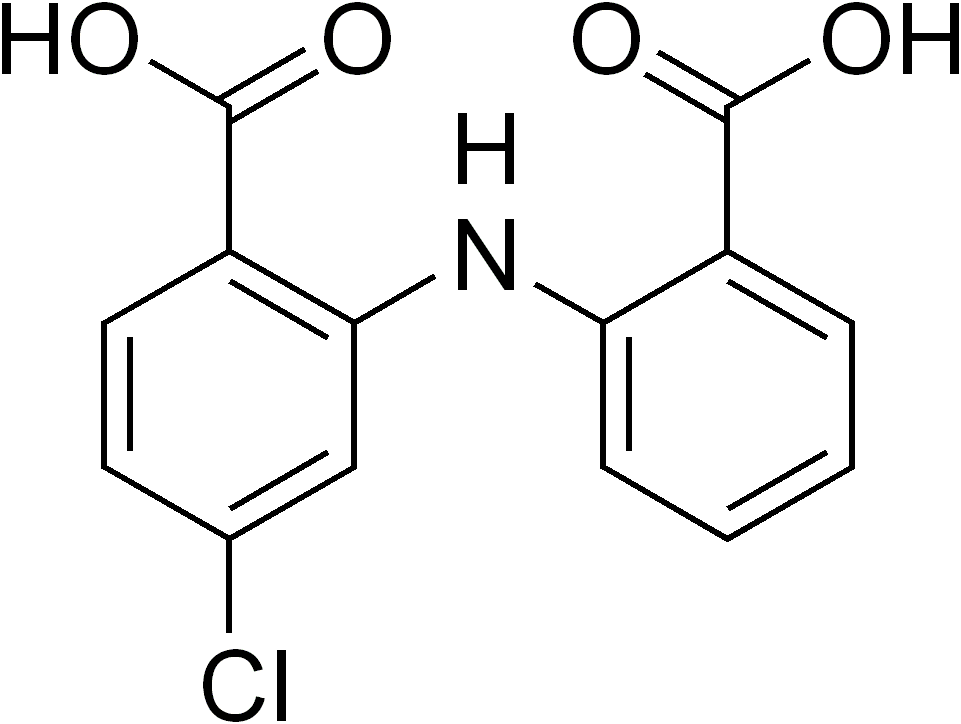

Clinical data
- AHFS/Drugs.com: International Drug Names
- Routes of administration: Oral
- ATC code: none

Legal status
- Legal status: In general: ℞ (Prescription only)

Identifiers
- IUPAC name: 2-[(2-Carboxyphenyl)amino]-4-chlorobenzoic acid
- CAS Number: 63329-53-3
- PubChem CID: 3946
- ChemSpider: 3809
- UNII: 915EE91P39
- CompTox Dashboard (EPA): DTXSID20212709

Chemical and physical data
- Formula: C_{14}H_{10}ClNO_{4}
- Molar mass: 291.69 g·mol^{−1}
- 3D model (JSmol): Interactive image
- SMILES: C1=CC=C(C(=C1)C(=O)O)NC2=C(C=CC(=C2)Cl)C(=O)O
- InChI: InChI=1S/C14H10ClNO4/c15-8-5-6-10(14(19)20)12(7-8)16-11-4-2-1-3-9(11)13(17)18/h1-7,16H,(H,17,18)(H,19,20); Key:UGDPYGKWIHHBMB-UHFFFAOYSA-N

Lobenzarit (INN) is a drug used in the treatment of arthritis. It is an immunomodulator.
