= HotDog domain =

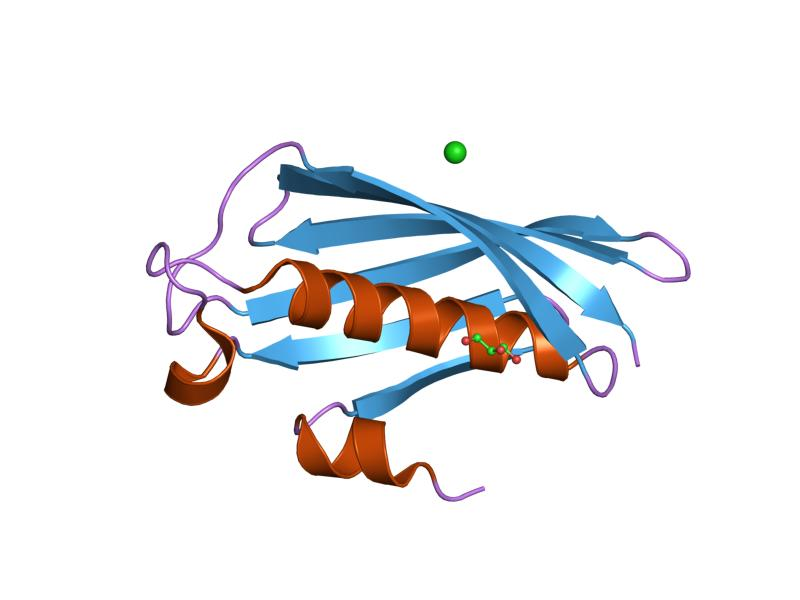
- Cartoon representation of the molecular structure of the crystal structure of TT0310 protein from Thermus thermophilus HB8 (PDB: 1WLU)

Identifiers
- Symbol: HotDog
- Pfam: PF03061
- Pfam clan: CL0050
- ECOD: 222.1.1
- InterPro: IPR029069
Available protein structures:
- PDB: IPR029069 PF03061 (ECOD; PDBsum)
- AlphaFold: IPR029069; PF03061

In molecular biology, the HotDog domain is a protein structural motif found in a diverse superfamily of enzymes, primarily thioesterases and dehydratases. The name "HotDog" refers to its characteristic structure, where a central α-helix (the "sausage") is wrapped by a curved β-sheet (the "bun").

== Structure ==
The HotDog domain consists of a central α-helix (typically 5 turns long) and an antiparallel β-sheet (usually 5-7 strands) that wraps around the α-helix. The basic structural unit of HotDog domain proteins is typically a homodimer, formed by the association of two monomers or two tandem copies of the domain. However, more complex quaternary structures, including tetramers and hexamers, have been observed.

== Function ==
Proteins containing the HotDog domain are primarily involved in thioester hydrolysis, various ehydration reactions and acyl transfer reactions. Hotdog fold protein play roles in various metabolic pathways, such as fatty acid biosynthesis and degradation, polyketide biosynthesis and phenylacetic acid degradation.

== Enzyme families ==
The HotDog domain superfamily includes several enzyme families, such as:

- 4-hydroxybenzoyl-CoA thioesterases
- FabA-like dehydratases
- YbgC-like acyl-CoA thioesterases
- TesB-like thioesterases
- MaoC dehydratase-like enzymes

== Catalytic mechanism ==
The catalytic mechanism of HotDog domain enzymes varies depending on the specific enzyme and reaction. However, many of these enzymes share common features in their active sites including a conserved catalytic triad or dyad, often including aspartate, glutamate, or serine residues. A nucleophilic attack mechanism, typically involving an activated water molecule and substrate binding sites that accommodate the CoA moiety and the acyl group.

== Evolution and distribution ==
HotDog domain proteins are found in all three domains of life: Bacteria, Archaea, and Eukaryota. Their widespread distribution suggests an ancient evolutionary origin. Despite low overall sequence similarity, the structural conservation of the HotDog fold implies a common ancestor for these diverse enzymes.

== See also ==
- Protein fold
- Thioesterase
- Dehydratase
- Fatty acid synthesis
