= Benzoate 4-monooxygenase =

Class of enzymes

Identifiers
- EC no.: 1.14.14.92
- CAS no.: 39391-25-8

Databases
- IntEnz: IntEnz view
- BRENDA: BRENDA entry
- ExPASy: NiceZyme view
- KEGG: KEGG entry
- MetaCyc: metabolic pathway
- PRIAM: profile
- PDB structures: RCSB PDB PDBe PDBsum
- Gene Ontology: AmiGO / QuickGO
Search
- PMC: articles
- PubMed: articles
- NCBI: proteins

Benzoate 4-monooxygenase (EC 1.14.14.92, Formerly EC 1.14.13.12) is an enzyme that catalyzes the chemical reaction

Benzoic acid
+ NADPH + H^{+}
O_{2}
H_{2}O
4-Hydroxybenzoic acid
+ NADP^{+}

The four substrates of this enzyme are benzoic acid, reduced nicotinamide adenine dinucleotide phosphate (NADPH), oxygen, and a proton. Its products are 4-hydroxybenzoic acid, oxidised NADP^{+}, and water.

The enzyme is a cytochrome P450 protein containing heme. It requires a partner, cytochrome P450 reductase, using NADPH for functional expression. The systematic name of this enzyme class is benzoate,NADPH:oxygen oxidoreductase (4-hydroxylating). Other names in common use include benzoic acid 4-hydroxylase, benzoate 4-hydroxylase, benzoic 4-hydroxylase, benzoate-p-hydroxylase, and p-hydroxybenzoate hydroxylase. It participates in benzoate degradation via hydroxylation.
