= 4-hydroxybenzoate 3-monooxygenase (NAD(P)H) =

Class of enzymes

4-hydroxybenzoate 3-monooxygenase [NAD(P)H]

Identifiers
- EC no.: 1.14.13.33
- CAS no.: 95471-33-3

Databases
- BRENDA: enzyme data
- ExPASy: NiceZyme view
- KEGG: enzyme entry
- MetaCyc: metabolic pathway
- Rhea: reactions
- PDB structures: RCSB PDB PDBe PDBsum
- Gene Ontology: AmiGO / QuickGO
Search
- PMC: articles
- PubMed: articles
- NCBI: proteins

4-hydroxybenzoate 3-monooxygenase [NAD(P)H] (EC 1.14.13.33) is an enzyme that catalyzes the chemical reaction

4-Hydroxybenzoic acid
+ NADH + H^{+}
O_{2}
H_{2}O
Protocatechuic acid
+ NAD^{+}

The four substrates of this enzyme are 4-hydroxybenzoic acid, reduced nicotinamide adenine dinucleotide (NADH), oxygen, and a proton. Its products are protocatechuic acid, oxidised NAD^{+}, and water. Nicotinamide adenine dinucleotide phosphate can be used as an alternative cofactor.

The enzyme is a flavin-containing monooxygenase that uses molecular oxygen as oxidant and incorporates one of its atoms into the starting material. The systematic name of this enzyme class is 4-hydroxybenzoate,NAD(P)H:oxygen oxidoreductase (3-hydroxylating). Other names in common use include 4-hydroxybenzoate 3-monooxygenase (reduced nicotinamide adenine, dinucleotide (phosphate)), 4-hydroxybenzoate-3-hydroxylase, and 4-hydroxybenzoate 3-hydroxylase. This enzyme participates in benzoate degradation via hydroxylation and also uses flavin adenine dinucleotide as a cofactor.
