= Monohydroxybenzoic acid =

Monohydroxybenzoic acid may refer to any of three isomeric phenolic acids:

- Salicylic acid (2-hydroxybenzoic acid, o-hydroxybenzoic acid)
- 3-Hydroxybenzoic acid (m-hydroxybenzoic acid)
- 4-Hydroxybenzoic acid (p-hydroxybenzoic acid)

Monohydroxybenzoic acids can be degraded by microbes.
