= 4-Hydroxybenzoate geranyltransferase =

Class of enzymes

4-hydroxybenzoate geranyltransferase

Identifiers
- EC no.: 2.5.1.93

Databases
- IntEnz: IntEnz view
- BRENDA: BRENDA entry
- ExPASy: NiceZyme view
- KEGG: KEGG entry
- MetaCyc: metabolic pathway
- PRIAM: profile
- PDB structures: RCSB PDB PDBe PDBsum
Search
- PMC: articles
- PubMed: articles
- NCBI: proteins

4-hydroxybenzoate geranyltransferase (EC 2.5.1.93, PGT1, PGT2, 4HB geranyltransferase, 4HB:geranyltransferase, p-hydroxybenzoate geranyltransferase, PHB geranyltransferase, geranyl diphosphate:4-hydroxybenzoate geranyltransferase) is an enzyme with systematic name geranyl-diphosphate:4-hydroxybenzoate 3-geranyltransferase. This enzyme catalyses the following chemical reaction

geranyl diphosphate + 4-hydroxybenzoate $\rightleftharpoons$ 3-geranyl-4-hydroxybenzoate + diphosphate

The enzyme is involved in shikonin biosynthesis. It has a strict substrate specificity for geranyl diphosphate and an absolute requirement for Mg^{2+}.
