= Alkannin =

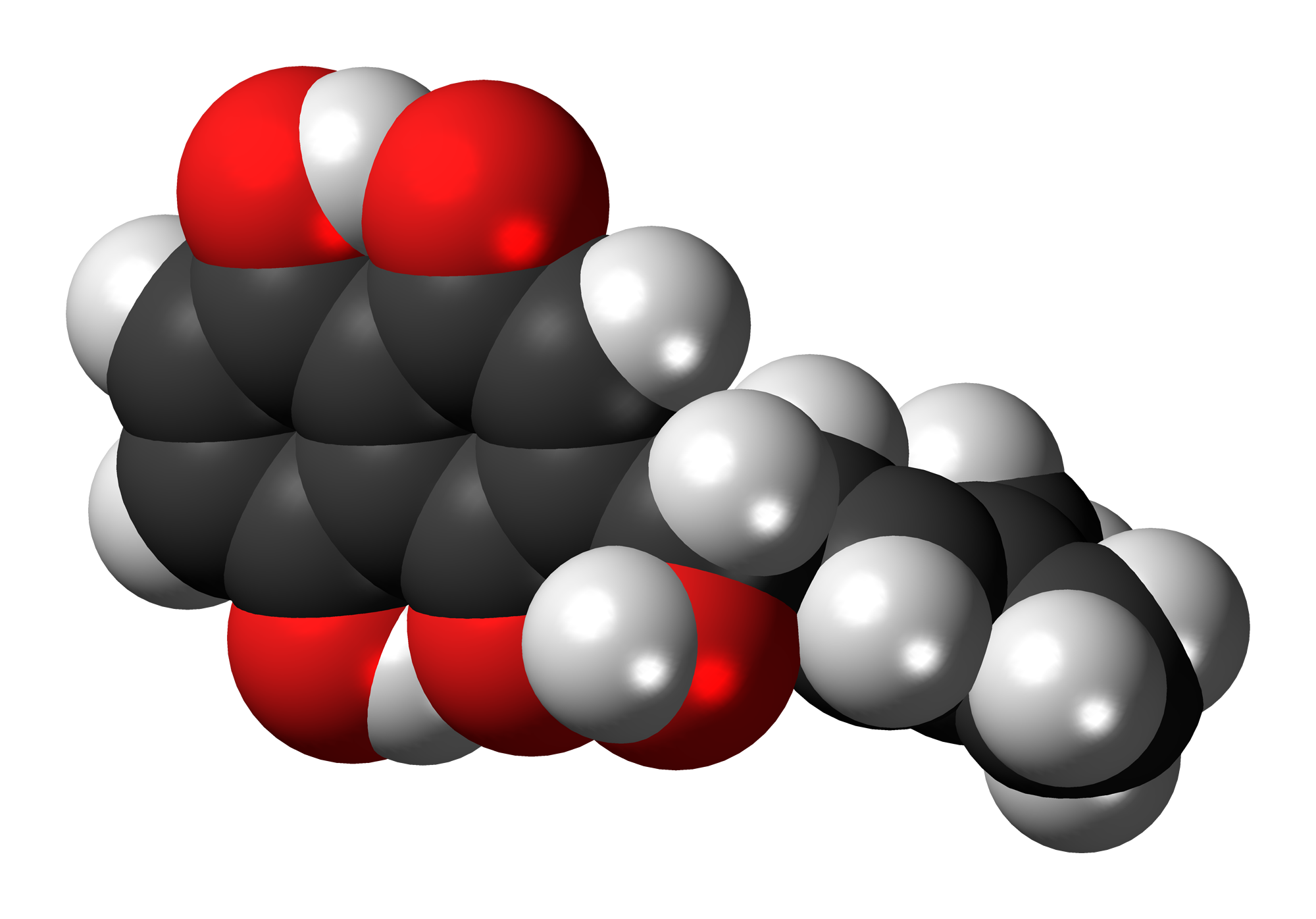

Names
- Preferred IUPAC name 5,8-Dihydroxy-2-[(1S)-1-hydroxy-4-methylpent-3-en-1-yl]naphthalene-1,4-dione
- Other names: C.I. Natural red 20; Alkanet extract; Anchusaic acid; Anchusin; Chrysoine S

Identifiers
CAS Number	517-88-4
3D model (JSmol)	Interactive image
ChEMBL	ChEMBL28457
ChemSpider	65430
ECHA InfoCard	100.007.497
E number	E103 (colours)
KEGG	C10292
PubChem CID	72521
UNII	075CRZ9995
CompTox Dashboard (EPA)	DTXSID201029621
- InChI: InChI=1S/C16H16O5/c1-8(2)3-4-10(17)9-7-13(20)14-11(18)5-6-12(19)15(14)16(9)21/h3,5-7,10,17-19H,4H2,1-2H3/t10-/m0/s1 Key: NEZONWMXZKDMKF-JTQLQIEISA-N; InChI=1/C16H16O5/c1-8(2)3-4-10(17)9-7-13(20)14-11(18)5-6-12(19)15(14)16(9)21/h3,5-7,10,17-19H,4H2,1-2H3/t10-/m0/s1
- SMILES: O=C\2c1c(O)ccc(O)c1C(=O)/C(=C/2)[C@@H](O)CC=C(C)C

Properties
Chemical formula	C_{16}H_{16}O_{5}
Molar mass	288.299 g·mol^{−1}
Appearance	Red-brown crystalline prisms
Density	1.15 g/mL
Melting point	149 °C (300 °F; 422 K)
Boiling point	567 °C (1,053 °F; 840 K)
Solubility in water	Sparingly soluble

Hazards
- Lethal dose or concentration (LD, LC)
LD_{50} (median dose)	3.0 g/kg (mice)
- Except where otherwise noted, data are given for materials in their standard state (at 25 °C [77 °F], 100 kPa). verify (what is ?) Infobox references

Alkannin is a natural dye that is obtained from the extracts of the plant dyer's alkanet (Alkanna tinctoria) which is found in the Mediterranean region. The dye is used as a food coloring and in cosmetics. It is designated E number E103 in the European Union, but has been banned since 1978. It is not permitted by the FDA in the US. It is used as a red-brown food additive in regions such as Australia.

Alkannin is deep red in an acid and blue in an alkaline environment. The chemical structure as a naphthoquinone derivative was first determined by Hans Brockmann in 1936. Alkannin is a chiral compound occurring as the (S)-enantiomer. The (R)-enantiomer is known as shikonin and the racemic mixture of the two is known as shikalkin.

== Biosynthesis ==
The enzyme 4-hydroxybenzoate geranyltransferase utilizes geranyl diphosphate and 4-hydroxybenzoic acid to produce 3-geranyl-4-hydroxybenzoic acid and diphosphate. These compounds are then used to form alkannin.

== Research ==
Because the root bark (cork layers) of Alkanna tinctoria contains large amounts of red naphthoquinone pigments, including alkannin, the roots of these plants are red-purple. When extracted from fresh tissues, the pigment gradually darkens over several days, finally forming black precipitates, which are thought to be polymers.
