= 4-hydroxybenzoate decarboxylase =

Class of enzymes

Identifiers
- EC no.: 4.1.1.61
- CAS no.: 37290-53-2

Databases
- BRENDA: enzyme data
- ExPASy: NiceZyme view
- KEGG: enzyme entry
- MetaCyc: metabolic pathway
- Rhea: reactions
- PDB structures: RCSB PDB PDBe PDBsum
- Gene Ontology: AmiGO / QuickGO
Search
- PMC: articles
- PubMed: articles
- NCBI: proteins

The enzyme 4-hydroxybenzoate decarboxylase (EC 4.1.1.61) characterised from Klebsiella aerogenes catalyzes the decarboxylation of 4-hydroxybenzoic acid to phenol and carbon dioxide:

4-hydroxybenzoic acid
CO_{2}
CO_{2}
phenol

The reaction is reversible and in denitrifying bacteria grown in anaerobic conditions gives 4-hydroxybenzoic acid from phenol. In Bacillus subtilis the reaction is reversible under all conditions and vanillic acid is an alternative substrate. The enzyme has therefore been of interest for deriving small molecules from lignin and other readily-available starting materials.

This enzyme is a lyase, specifically a carboxy-lyase, which cleave carbon-carbon bonds. The systematic name of this enzyme class is 4-hydroxybenzoate carboxy-lyase (phenol-forming). Other names in use include p-hydroxybenzoate decarboxylase, and 4-hydroxybenzoate carboxy-lyase.
