= Dodecyl acetate =

- Skeletal formula of dodecyl acetate

Names
- Preferred IUPAC name Dodecyl acetate
- Other names Lauryl acetate, Dodecan-1-yl acetate, 1-Dodecanol acetate, n-Dodecyl ethanoate, Dodecanol acetate, Dodecanyl acetate, n-Dodecyl acetate

Identifiers
CAS Number	112-66-3
3D model (JSmol)	Interactive image
ChemSpider	7913
ECHA InfoCard	100.003.632
EC Number	203-995-1
PubChem CID	8205
RTECS number	AH3525000
UNII	76J36KE44B
CompTox Dashboard (EPA)	DTXSID7047641
- InChI: InChI=1S/C14H28O2/c1-3-4-5-6-7-8-9-10-11-12-13-16-14(2)15/h3-13H2,1-2H3 Key: VZWGRQBCURJOMT-UHFFFAOYSA-N; InChI=1S/C14H28O2/c1-3-4-5-6-7-8-9-10-11-12-13-16-14(2)15/h3-13H2,1-2H3 Key: VZWGRQBCURJOMT-UHFFFAOYSA-N
- SMILES: CCCCCCCCCCCCOC(=O)C

Properties
Chemical formula	C_{14}H_{28}O_{2}
Molar mass	228.376 g·mol^{−1}
Appearance	Colorless liquid
Odor	Citrus-rose
Density	0.8652 g/cm^{3} (22 °C)
Melting point	0.7 °C (33.3 °F; 273.8 K) at 760 mmHg
Boiling point	265 °C (509 °F; 538 K) at 760 mmHg; 180 °C (356 °F; 453 K) at 40 mmHg; 150 °C (302 °F; 423 K) at 15 mmHg
Solubility	Soluble in most organic solvents
Solubility in ethanol	80% v/v in water: 250 mL/L
log P	6.1
Vapor pressure	0.13 Pa
Refractive index (n_{D})	1.4439 (20 °C)
Viscosity	2.81 cP (35 °C); 0.732 cP (70 °C); 0.511 cP (100 °C); 0.224 cP (200 °C)

Hazards
- GHS labelling
Hazard statements	H413
NFPA 704 (fire diamond)	1 1 0
Flash point	113 °C (235 °F; 386 K)
- Except where otherwise noted, data are given for materials in their standard state (at 25 °C [77 °F], 100 kPa). Infobox references

Dodecyl acetate or lauryl acetate, CH_{3}COO(CH_{2})_{11}CH_{3}, is the dodecyl ester of acetic acid. It has a floral odor and is useful as a perfume additive.
