= 3-Hydroxybenzoic acid =

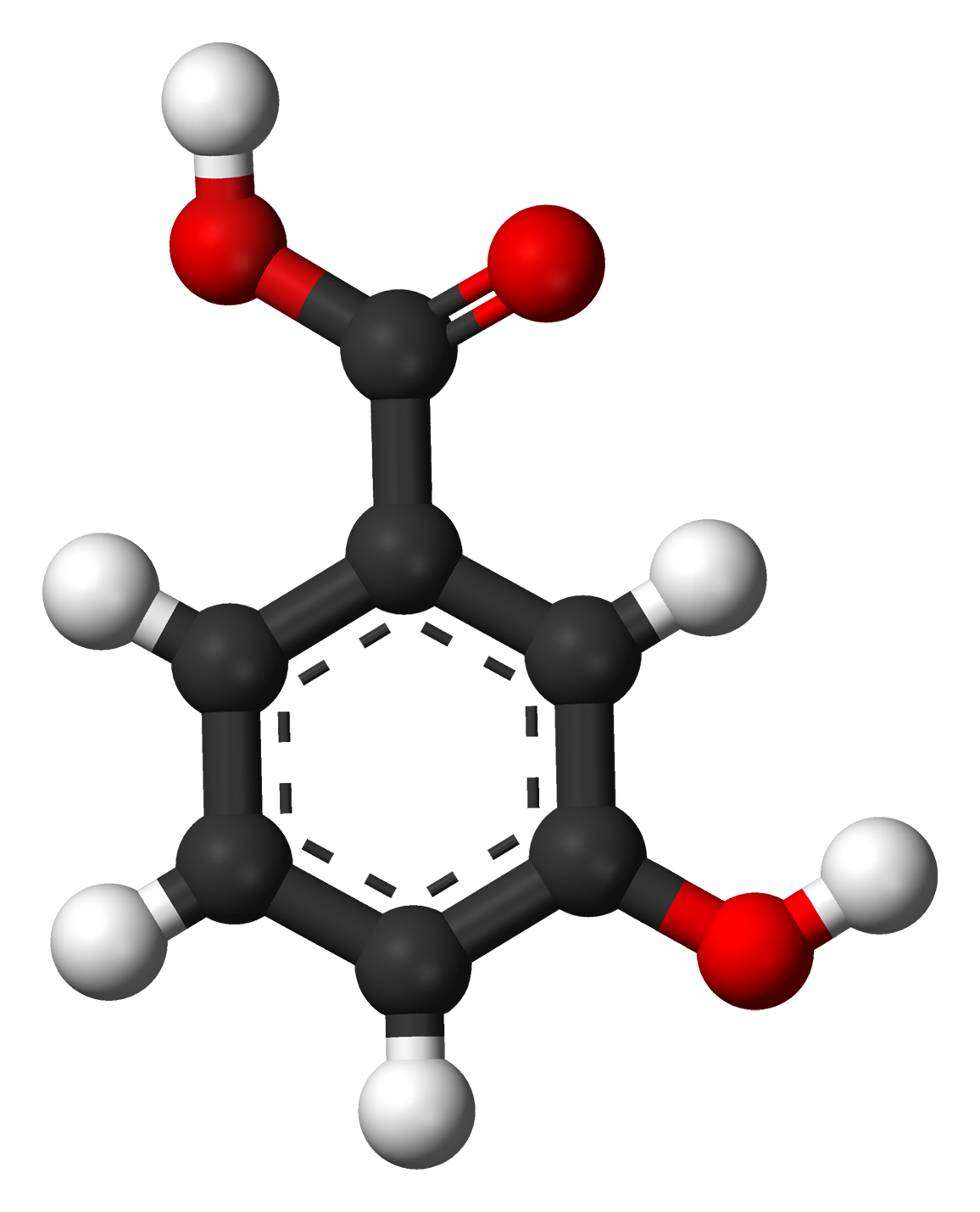

Names
- Preferred IUPAC name 3-Hydroxybenzoic acid
- Other names m-Hydroxybenzoic acid meta-Hydroxybenzoic acid 3-Carboxyphenol m-Salicylic acid

Identifiers
CAS Number	99-06-9
3D model (JSmol)	Interactive image; Interactive image
ChEBI	CHEBI:30764
ChEMBL	ChEMBL65369
ChemSpider	7142
ECHA InfoCard	100.002.478
PubChem CID	7420
UNII	2ZFW40OJ7U
CompTox Dashboard (EPA)	DTXSID6021610
- InChI: InChI=1S/C7H6O3/c8-6-3-1-2-5(4-6)7(9)10/h1-4,8H,(H,9,10) Key: IJFXRHURBJZNAO-UHFFFAOYSA-N
- SMILES: C1=CC(=CC(=C1)O)C(=O)O; O=C(O)c1cc(O)ccc1

Properties
Chemical formula	C_{7}H_{6}O_{3}
Molar mass	138.12 g/mol
- Except where otherwise noted, data are given for materials in their standard state (at 25 °C [77 °F], 100 kPa). verify (what is ?) Infobox references

3-Hydroxybenzoic acid is a monohydroxybenzoic acid.

== Preparation ==
3-Hydroxybenzoic acid can be obtained by the alkali fusion of 3-sulfobenzoic acid between 210 – 220°C.

== Natural occurrence ==
3-Hydroxybenzoic acid is a component of castoreum, the exudate from the castor sacs of the mature North American beaver (Castor canadensis) and the European beaver (Castor fiber), which is used in perfumery.

It can also be formed by a Pseudomonas species from 3-chlorobenzoic acid.

3-Hydroxybenzoic acid can be found in the pineapple fruit as well.

== Applications ==
A couple of uses of 3-hydroxybenzoic acid are in the synthesis of acifluorfen & oxybuprocaine.
