= 4-hydroxybenzoyl-CoA reductase =

Class of enzymes

Identifiers
- EC no.: 1.3.7.9

Databases
- IntEnz: IntEnz view
- BRENDA: BRENDA entry
- ExPASy: NiceZyme view
- KEGG: KEGG entry
- MetaCyc: metabolic pathway
- PRIAM: profile
- PDB structures: RCSB PDB PDBe PDBsum
- Gene Ontology: AmiGO / QuickGO
Search
- PMC: articles
- PubMed: articles
- NCBI: proteins

In enzymology, a 4-hydroxybenzoyl-CoA reductase (EC 1.3.7.9) is an enzyme found in some bacteria and archaea that catalyzes the chemical reaction

benzoyl-CoA + acceptor + H_{2}O $\rightleftharpoons$ 4-hydroxybenzoyl-CoA + reduced acceptor

The 3 substrates of this enzyme are benzoyl-CoA, acceptor, and H_{2}O, whereas its two products are 4-hydroxybenzoyl-CoA and reduced acceptor.

This enzyme participates in benzoate degradation via coa ligation.

== Nomenclature ==
This enzyme belongs to the family of oxidoreductases, specifically those acting on the CH-CH group of donor with other acceptors. The systematic name of this enzyme class is benzoyl-CoA:acceptor oxidoreductase. Other names in common use include:

- 4-hydroxybenzoyl-CoA reductase (dehydroxylating), and
- 4-hydroxybenzoyl-CoA:(acceptor) oxidoreductase.
