= 3-Chlorobenzoic acid =

Names
- Preferred IUPAC name 3-Chlorobenzoic acid
- Other names m-Chlorobenzoic acid meta-Chlorobenzoic acid 3BZ

Identifiers
CAS Number	535-80-8
3D model (JSmol)	Interactive image
Beilstein Reference	907218
ChEBI	CHEBI:49410
ChEMBL	ChEMBL20563
ChemSpider	434
ECHA InfoCard	100.007.837
EC Number	208-618-4
Gmelin Reference	3664
PubChem CID	447
UNII	02UOJ7064K
CompTox Dashboard (EPA)	DTXSID9024770
- InChI: InChI=1S/C7H5ClO2/c8-6-3-1-2-5(4-6)7(9)10/h1-4H,(H,9,10) Key: LULAYUGMBFYYEX-UHFFFAOYSA-N
- SMILES: C1=CC(=CC(=C1)Cl)C(=O)O

Properties
Chemical formula	C_{7}H_{5}ClO_{2}
Molar mass	156.57 g·mol^{−1}
Appearance	white solid
Density	1.517 g/cm^{3}
Melting point	154 °C (309 °F; 427 K)
Boiling point	275 °C (527 °F; 548 K)

Hazards
- GHS labelling
Pictograms	(GHS07: Exclamation mark)
Signal word	Warning
Hazard statements	H315, H319, H335
Precautionary statements	P261, P264, P271, P280, P302+P352, P304+P340, P305+P351+P338, P312, P321, P332+P313, P337+P313, P362, P403+P233, P405, P501
Flash point	150 °C (302 °F; 423 K)
- Except where otherwise noted, data are given for materials in their standard state (at 25 °C [77 °F], 100 kPa). Infobox references

3-Chlorobenzoic acid is an organic compound with the molecular formula ClC_{6}H_{4}CO_{2}H. It is a white solid that is soluble in some organic solvents and in aqueous base.

== Synthesis and occurrence ==
3-Chlorobenzoic acid is prepared by chlorination of benzoic acid.

It is a metabolic byproduct of the drug bupropion.
