= 4-Chlorobenzoic acid =

Names
- Preferred IUPAC name 4-Chlorobenzoic acid
- Other names p-Chlorobenzoic acid para-Chlorobenzoic acid

Identifiers
CAS Number	74-11-3
3D model (JSmol)	Interactive image
Beilstein Reference	907196
ChEBI	CHEBI:30747
ChEMBL	ChEMBL618
ChemSpider	6079
DrugBank	DB03728
ECHA InfoCard	100.000.733
EC Number	200-805-9
Gmelin Reference	3034
KEGG	C02370
PubChem CID	6318
RTECS number	DG4976010
UNII	IC7888DF4L
CompTox Dashboard (EPA)	DTXSID9024772
- InChI: InChI=1S/C7H5ClO2/c8-6-3-1-5(2-4-6)7(9)10/h1-4H,(H,9,10) Key: XRHGYUZYPHTUJZ-UHFFFAOYSA-N
- SMILES: C1=CC(=CC=C1C(=O)O)Cl

Properties
Chemical formula	C_{7}H_{5}ClO_{2}
Molar mass	156.57 g·mol^{−1}
Appearance	white solid
Density	1.541 g/cm^{3}
Melting point	241.5 °C (466.7 °F; 514.6 K)
Boiling point	276 °C (529 °F; 549 K)

Hazards
- GHS labelling
Pictograms	(GHS06: Toxic) (GHS07: Exclamation mark) (GHS09: Environmental hazard)
Signal word	Danger
Hazard statements	H302, H315, H319, H335
Precautionary statements	P261, P264, P270, P271, P273, P280, P301+P312, P302+P352, P304+P312, P304+P340, P305+P351+P338, P311, P312, P321, P322, P330, P332+P313, P337+P313, P361, P362, P363, P391, P403+P233, P405, P501
Flash point	238 °C (460 °F; 511 K)
- Except where otherwise noted, data are given for materials in their standard state (at 25 °C [77 °F], 100 kPa). Infobox references

4-Chlorobenzoic acid is an organic compound with the molecular formula ClC_{6}H_{4}CO_{2}H. It is a white solid that is soluble in some organic solvents and in aqueous base. 4-Chlorobenzoic acid is prepared by oxidation of 4-chlorotoluene.
