= P-Anisic acid =

p-Anisic acid

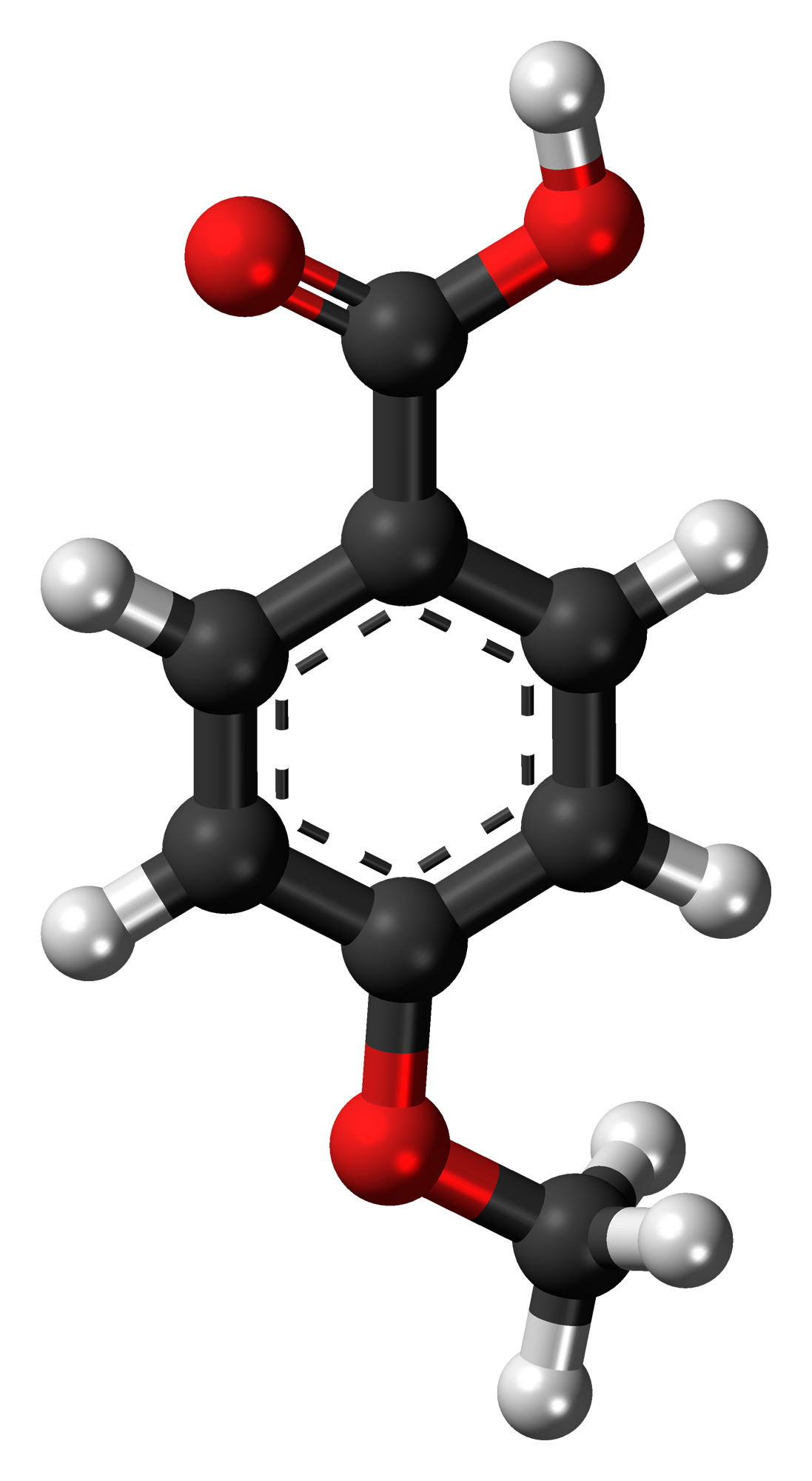

Names
- Preferred IUPAC name 4-Methoxybenzoic acid
- Other names Draconic acid

Identifiers
CAS Number	100-09-4
3D model (JSmol)	Interactive image
Beilstein Reference	508910
ChEBI	CHEBI:40813
ChEMBL	ChEMBL21932; sodium salt: ChEMBL1762657
ChemSpider	10181338
ECHA InfoCard	100.002.562
EC Number	202-818-5
Gmelin Reference	3499
KEGG	C02519
PubChem CID	7478
UNII	4SB6Y7DMM3
CompTox Dashboard (EPA)	DTXSID4059205
- InChI: InChI=1S/C8H8O3/c1-11-7-4-2-6(3-5-7)8(9)10/h2-5H,1H3,(H,9,10) Key: ZEYHEAKUIGZSGI-UHFFFAOYSA-N
- SMILES: O=C(O)C1=CC=C(OC)C=C1

Properties
Chemical formula	C_{8}H_{8}O_{3}
Molar mass	152.149 g·mol^{−1}
Density	1.385 g/cm^{3}
Melting point	184 °C (363 °F; 457 K) (sublimation)
Boiling point	275 to 280 °C (527 to 536 °F; 548 to 553 K)
Solubility in water	1 part per 2500
Acidity (pK_{a})	4.47

Structure
Crystal structure	monoclinic
Space group	P2_{1}/a
Lattice constant	a = 16.98 Å, b = 10.95 Å, c = 3.98 Å α = 90°, β = 98.7°, γ = 90°
Formula units (Z)	4

Hazards
- GHS labelling
Pictograms	(GHS07: Exclamation mark)
Signal word	Warning
Hazard statements	H302, H315, H319, H335
Precautionary statements	P261, P264, P270, P271, P280, P301+P312, P302+P352, P304+P340, P305+P351+P338, P312, P330, P332+P313, P337+P313, P362, P403+P233, P405
- Except where otherwise noted, data are given for materials in their standard state (at 25 °C [77 °F], 100 kPa). Infobox references

p-Anisic acid, also known as 4-methoxybenzoic acid or draconic acid, is one of the isomers of anisic acid. The term "anisic acid" often refers to this form specifically. It is a white crystalline solid which is insoluble in water, highly soluble in alcohols, and soluble in ether and ethyl acetate.

== Synthesis and occurrence ==
p-Anisic acid is found naturally in anise. It was first synthesized in 1841 by Auguste Cahours by oxidizing anethole that he had isolated from anise by recrystallization with diluted nitric acid:

CH_{3}CH=CHC_{6}H_{4}OCH_{3} + HNO_{3} → CH_{3}OC_{6}H_{4}CHO + others
CH_{3}OC_{6}H_{4}CHO + HNO_{3} → CH_{3}OC_{6}H_{4}COOH + others

Oxidation of anisaldehyde, which was Cahours' intermediate product, is still used nowadays. Anisic acid can also be obtained synthetically by the oxidation of p-methoxyacetophenone.

== Uses ==
p-Anisic acid has antiseptic properties. It is also used as an intermediate in the preparation of more complex organic compounds.
