= Nicotinic acid hydroxylase =

Nicotinic acid hydroxylase may refer to:

- Nicotinate dehydrogenase (cytochrome), an enzyme
- Nicotinate dehydrogenase, an enzyme
