= Nicotinate hydroxylase =

Nicotinate hydroxylase may refer to the following enzymes:

- Nicotinate dehydrogenase (cytochrome)
- Nicotinate dehydrogenase
