= Malonyl-S-ACP:biotin-protein carboxyltransferase =

Identifiers
- EC no.: 2.1.3.10

Databases
- IntEnz: IntEnz view
- BRENDA: BRENDA entry
- ExPASy: NiceZyme view
- KEGG: KEGG entry
- MetaCyc: metabolic pathway
- PRIAM: profile
- PDB structures: RCSB PDB PDBe PDBsum
Search
- PMC: articles
- PubMed: articles
- NCBI: proteins

Malonyl-S-ACP:biotin-protein carboxyltransferase (EC 2.1.3.10, malonyl-S-acyl-carrier protein:biotin-protein carboxyltransferase, MadC/MadD, MadC,D, malonyl-[acyl-carrier protein]:biotinyl-[protein] carboxyltransferase) is an enzyme with systematic name malonyl-(acyl-carrier protein):biotinyl-(protein) carboxytransferase. This enzyme catalyses the following chemical reaction:

malonyl-[acyl-carrier protein] + biotinyl-[protein] $\rightleftharpoons$ acetyl-[acyl-carrier protein] + carboxybiotinyl-[protein]

This enzyme is a component of EC 4.1.1.89, biotin-dependent malonate decarboxylase.
