= THIG =

THIG or Thig may refer to:

- Sharkula (born 1973), Chicago-area, US rapper
- Thiazole synthase, an enzyme
- Tower Hamlets Independent Group, a former British local political party
