= Madh =

Madh or MADH may refer to:

- Madh (alcohol), in Sanskrit
- Madh (singer) (born 1993), Italian singer
- Madh Island, Mumbai, India
- ACP-SH:acetate ligase, MadH, an enzyme
- Methylamine dehydrogenase, MADH, an enzyme
