= Adenylyltransferase and sulfurtransferase MOCS3 =

Adenylyltransferase and sulfurtransferase MOCS3 may refer to:

- Molybdopterin synthase sulfurtransferase, an enzyme
- Molybdopterin-synthase adenylyltransferase, an enzyme
