= (citrate (pro-3S)-lyase) ligase =

Class of enzymes

[Citrate (pro-3S)-lyase] ligase

Identifiers
- EC no.: 6.2.1.22
- CAS no.: 52660-22-7

Databases
- IntEnz: IntEnz view
- BRENDA: BRENDA entry
- ExPASy: NiceZyme view
- KEGG: KEGG entry
- MetaCyc: metabolic pathway
- PRIAM: profile
- PDB structures: RCSB PDB PDBe PDBsum
- Gene Ontology: AmiGO / QuickGO
Search
- PMC: articles
- PubMed: articles
- NCBI: proteins

In enzymology, a [citrate (pro-3S)-lyase] ligase (EC 6.2.1.22) is an enzyme that catalyzes the chemical reaction

ATP + acetate + citrate (pro-3S)-lyase(thiol form) $\rightleftharpoons$ AMP + diphosphate + citrate (pro-3S)-lyase(acetyl form)

The 3 substrates of this enzyme are ATP, acetate, and citrate (pro-3S)-lyase(thiol form), whereas its 3 products are AMP, diphosphate, and citrate (pro-3S)-lyase(acetyl form).

This enzyme belongs to the family of ligases, specifically those forming carbon-sulfur bonds as acid-thiol ligases. The systematic name of this enzyme class is acetate:citrate (pro-3S)-lyase(thiol-form) ligase (AMP-forming). Other names in common use include citrate lyase ligase, citrate lyase synthetase, acetate: SH-acyl-carrier-protein enzyme ligase (AMP), acetate:HS-citrate lyase ligase, and acetate:citrate-(pro-3S)-lyase(thiol-form) ligase (AMP-forming). This enzyme participates in two-component system - general.
