= Acetate thiokinase =

Acetate thiokinase may refer to:

- Acetate—CoA ligase (ADP-forming), an enzyme
- Acetyl-CoA synthetase (or Acetyl-CoA ligase), an enzyme
