= Thiosulfate—thiol sulfurtransferase =

Class of enzymes

Thiosulfate-thiol sulfurtransferase

Identifiers
- EC no.: 2.8.1.3
- CAS no.: 111070-24-7

Databases
- IntEnz: IntEnz view
- BRENDA: BRENDA entry
- ExPASy: NiceZyme view
- KEGG: KEGG entry
- MetaCyc: metabolic pathway
- PRIAM: profile
- PDB structures: RCSB PDB PDBe PDBsum
- Gene Ontology: AmiGO / QuickGO
Search
- PMC: articles
- PubMed: articles
- NCBI: proteins

Thiosulfate-thiol sulfurtransferase (EC 2.8.1.3) is an enzyme that catalyzes the chemical reaction

HOSO_{2}S^{−} +
glutathione
H^{+}
H_{2}S
(HO)_{2}SO +
glutathione disulfide

The enzyme characterised from Thiobacillus thioparus converts thiosulfate to sulfite and hydrogen sulfide by reaction with two units of glutathione, which is dimerised to glutathione disulfide. The enzyme has also been found in carp liver and yeast.

This enzyme is a transferases, specifically a sulfurtransferases, which transfer sulfur-containing groups. The systematic name of this enzyme class is thiosulfate:thiol sulfurtransferase. Other names in common use include glutathione-dependent thiosulfate reductase, sulfane reductase, and sulfane sulfurtransferase.
