= Thiosulfate—dithiol sulfurtransferase =

Class of enzymes

Thiosulfate-dithiol sulfurtransferase

Identifiers
- EC no.: 2.8.1.5
- CAS no.: 9059-49-8

Databases
- IntEnz: IntEnz view
- BRENDA: BRENDA entry
- ExPASy: NiceZyme view
- KEGG: KEGG entry
- MetaCyc: metabolic pathway
- PRIAM: profile
- PDB structures: RCSB PDB PDBe PDBsum
- Gene Ontology: AmiGO / QuickGO
Search
- PMC: articles
- PubMed: articles
- NCBI: proteins

Thiosulfate-dithiol sulfurtransferase (EC 2.8.1.5) is an enzyme that catalyzes the chemical reaction

HOSO_{2}S^{−} +
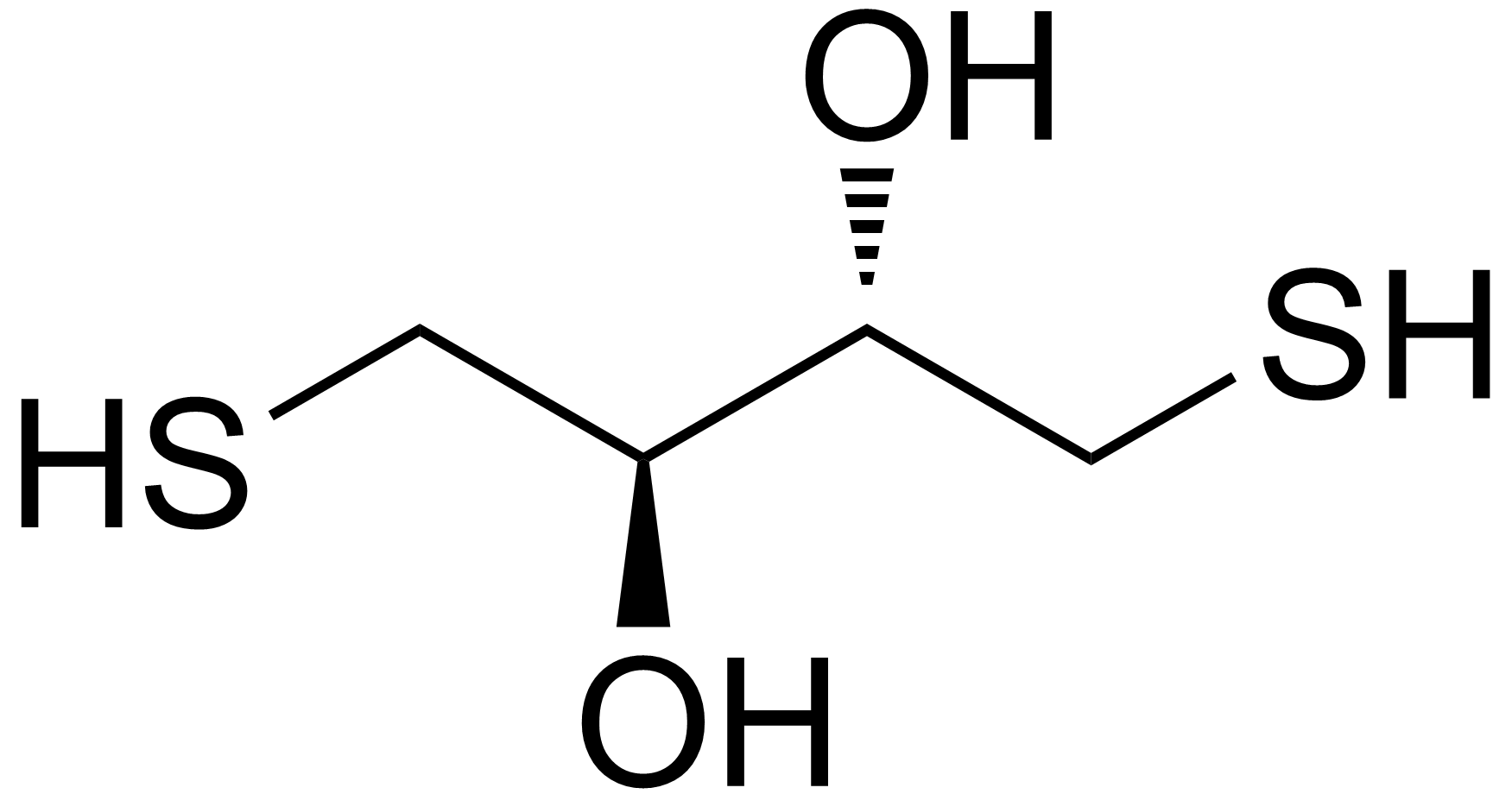
dithioerythritol
H^{+}
H_{2}S
(HO)_{2}SO +
cis-1,2-dithiane-4,5-diol

The enzyme characterised from Chlorella fusca converts thiosulfate to sulfite and hydrogen sulfide by reaction with dithioerythritol, which is cyclised to cis-1,2-dithiane-4,5-diol.

This enzyme is a transferases, specifically a sulfurtransferases, which transfer sulfur-containing groups. The systematic name of this enzyme class is thiosulfate:dithioerythritol sulfurtransferase. Other names in common use include thiosulfate reductase, and TSR.
