= Trans-epoxysuccinate hydrolase =

Class of enzymes

Identifiers
- EC no.: 3.3.2.4
- CAS no.: 37290-73-6

Databases
- BRENDA: enzyme data
- ExPASy: NiceZyme view
- KEGG: enzyme entry
- MetaCyc: metabolic pathway
- Rhea: reactions
- PDB structures: RCSB PDB PDBe PDBsum
- Gene Ontology: AmiGO / QuickGO
Search
- PMC: articles
- PubMed: articles
- NCBI: proteins

Trans-epoxysuccinate hydrolase (EC 3.3.2.4) is an enzyme that catalyzes the chemical reaction

trans-2,3-epoxysuccinic acid
H_{2}O
mesotartaric acid

The enzyme characterised from Pseudomonas putida hydrolyses both optical isomers of trans-2,3-epoxysuccinic acid to mesotartaric acid. The structure and mechanism of the enzyme from Pseudomonas koreensis has been studied as a means of producing mesotrtaric acid.

This enzyme is a hydrolase, specifically one acting on ether bonds (ether hydrolases). The systematic name of this enzyme class is trans-2,3-epoxysuccinate hydrolase. Other names in common use include trans-epoxysuccinate hydratase, and tartrate epoxydase.
