= Trithionate hydrolase =

Class of enzymes

Identifiers
- EC no.: 3.12.1.1
- CAS no.: 115004-90-5

Databases
- BRENDA: enzyme data
- ExPASy: NiceZyme view
- KEGG: enzyme entry
- MetaCyc: metabolic pathway
- Rhea: reactions
- PDB structures: RCSB PDB PDBe PDBsum
- Gene Ontology: AmiGO / QuickGO
Search
- PMC: articles
- PubMed: articles
- NCBI: proteins

Trithionate hydrolase (EC 3.12.1.1) is an enzyme characterised from Thiobacillus tepidarius that catalyzes the hydrolysis of trithionic acid to thiosulfuric acid and sulfuric acid:

trithionic acid
H_{2}O
H_{2}SO_{4}
thiosulfuric acid

The reaction is part of biochemical pathways by which bacteria metabolise thiosulfate/thiosulfuric acid.

This enzyme is a hydrolase, specifically one acting on sulfur-sulfur bonds. The systematic name of this enzyme class is trithionate thiosulfohydrolase.
