= Thiamine oxidase =

thiamin oxidase
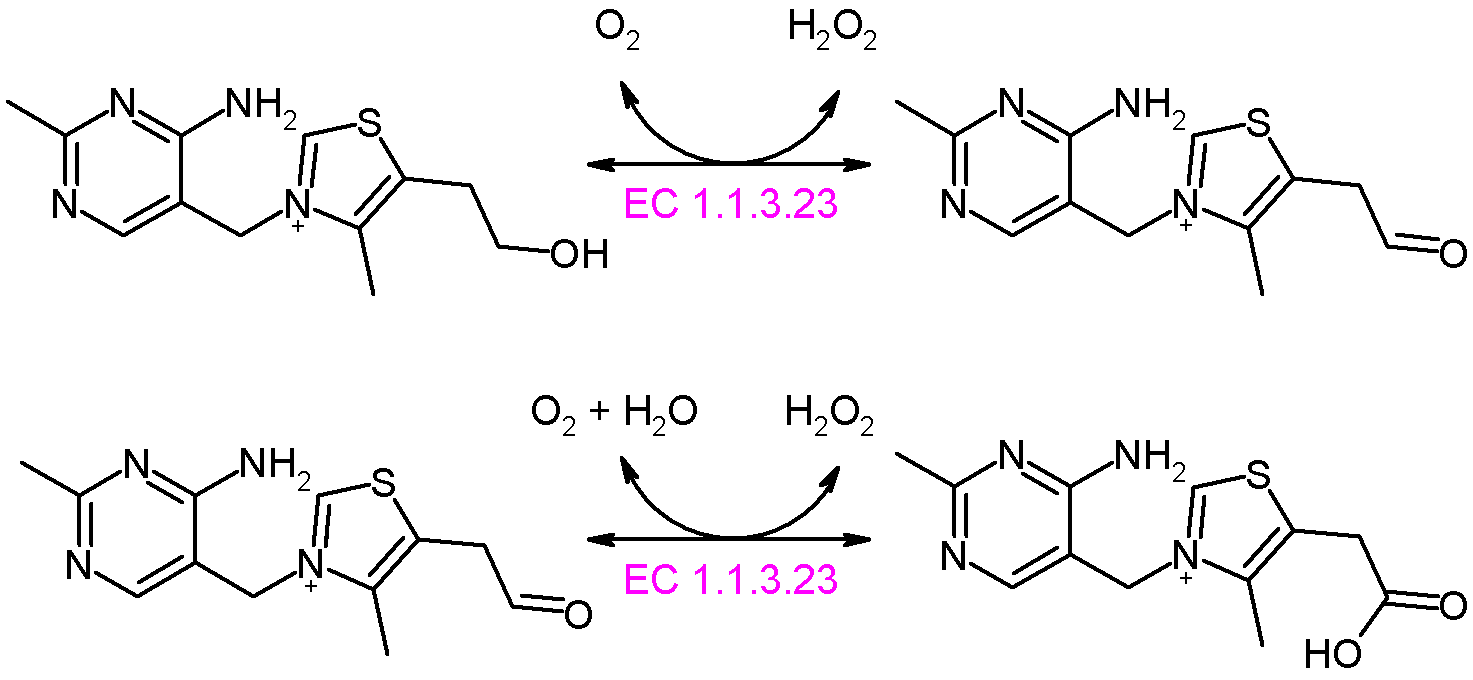
- Thiamine oxidase reaction

Identifiers
- EC no.: 1.1.3.23
- CAS no.: 96779-44-1

Databases
- BRENDA: enzyme data
- ExPASy: NiceZyme view
- KEGG: enzyme entry
- MetaCyc: metabolic pathway
- Rhea: reactions
- PDB structures: RCSB PDB PDBe PDBsum
- Gene Ontology: AmiGO / QuickGO
Search
- PMC: articles
- PubMed: articles
- NCBI: proteins

In enzymology, a thiamine oxidase (EC 1.1.3.23) is an enzyme that catalyzes the chemical reaction

thiamine + 2 O_{2} + H_{2}O $\rightleftharpoons$ thiamine acetic acid + 2 H_{2}O_{2}

The 3 substrates of this enzyme are thiamine, O_{2}, and H_{2}O, whereas its two products are thiamine acetic acid and H_{2}O_{2}.

This enzyme belongs to the family of oxidoreductases, specifically those acting on the CH-OH group of donor with oxygen as acceptor. The systematic name of this enzyme class is thiamine:oxygen 5-oxidoreductase. Other names in common use include thiamin dehydrogenase, thiamine dehydrogenase, and thiamin:oxygen 5-oxidoreductase. This enzyme participates in thiamine metabolism. It employs one cofactor, FAD.
