= 6-carboxytetrahydropterin synthase =

Enzyme

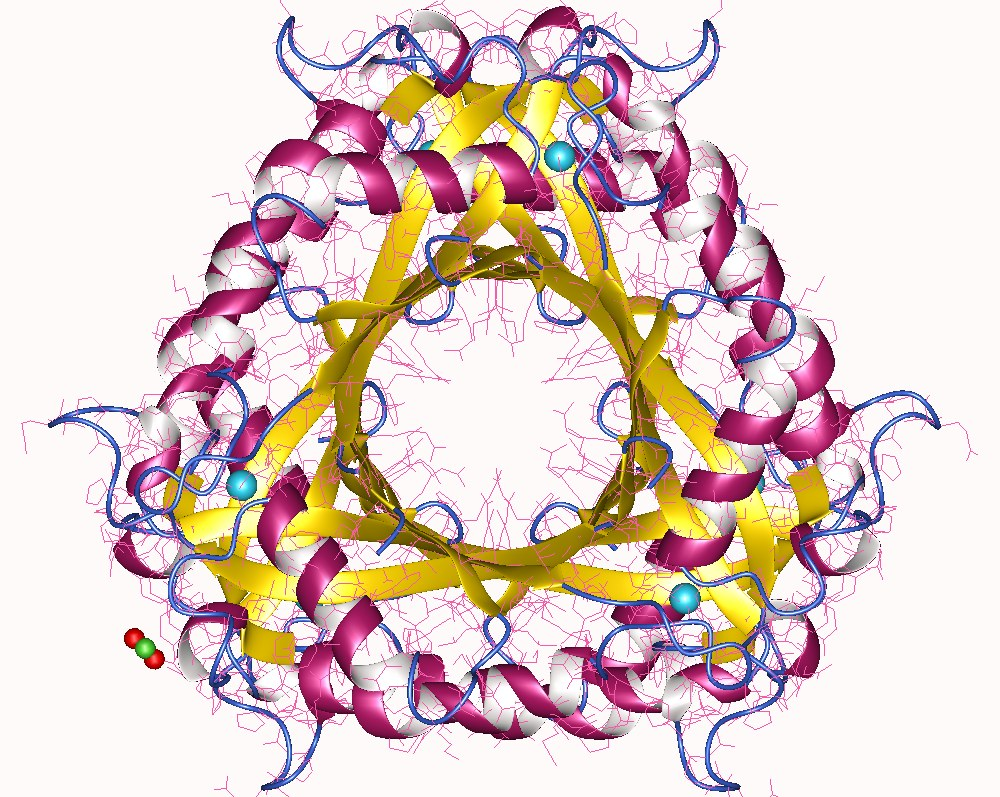
- 6-Carboxy-5,6,7,8-tetrahydropterin synthase hexamer, E.Coli

Identifiers
- EC no.: 4.1.2.50

Databases
- IntEnz: IntEnz view
- BRENDA: BRENDA entry
- ExPASy: NiceZyme view
- KEGG: KEGG entry
- MetaCyc: metabolic pathway
- PRIAM: profile
- PDB structures: RCSB PDB PDBe PDBsum
Search
- PMC: articles
- PubMed: articles
- NCBI: proteins

6-carboxytetrahydropterin synthase (EC 4.1.2.50, CPH4 synthase, queD (gene), ToyB, ykvK (gene)) is an enzyme with systematic name 7,8-dihydroneopterin 3'-triphosphate acetaldehyde-lyase (6-carboxy-5,6,7,8-tetrahydropterin and triphosphate-forming). This enzyme catalyses the following reversible chemical reaction.

7,8-dihydroneopterin 3′-triphosphate + H_{2}O ⇌ 6-carboxy-5,6,7,8-tetrahydropterin + acetaldehyde + triphosphate

This enzyme binds Zn^{2+}. It is isolated from the bacteria Bacillus subtilis and Escherichia coli. The stimulation is part of the biosynthesis pathway of queuosine. The enzyme from Escherichia coli can also convert 6-pyruvoyl-5,6,7,8-tetrahydropterin and sepiapterin to 6-carboxy-5,6,7,8-tetrahydropterin.
