= ACP-SH:acetate ligase =

Class of enzymes

Acetate—[acyl-carrier protein] ligase

Identifiers
- EC no.: 6.2.1.35

Databases
- IntEnz: IntEnz view
- BRENDA: BRENDA entry
- ExPASy: NiceZyme view
- KEGG: KEGG entry
- MetaCyc: metabolic pathway
- PRIAM: profile
- PDB structures: RCSB PDB PDBe PDBsum
Search
- PMC: articles
- PubMed: articles
- NCBI: proteins

Acetate—[acyl-carrier protein] ligase (EC 6.2.1.35, HS-acyl-carrier protein:acetate ligase, [acyl-carrier protein]:acetate ligase, MadH) is an enzyme with systematic name acetate:(acyl-carrier-protein) ligase (AMP-forming). This enzyme catalyses the following chemical reaction

ATP + acetate + an [acyl-carrier protein] $\rightleftharpoons$ AMP + diphosphate + an acetyl-[acyl-carrier protein]

This enzyme, from the anaerobic bacterium Malonomonas rubra, is a component of the multienzyme complex EC 4.1.1.89, biotin-dependent malonate decarboxylase.
