= Limonene-1,2-epoxide hydrolase =

Limonene-1,2-epoxide hydrolase catalytic domain
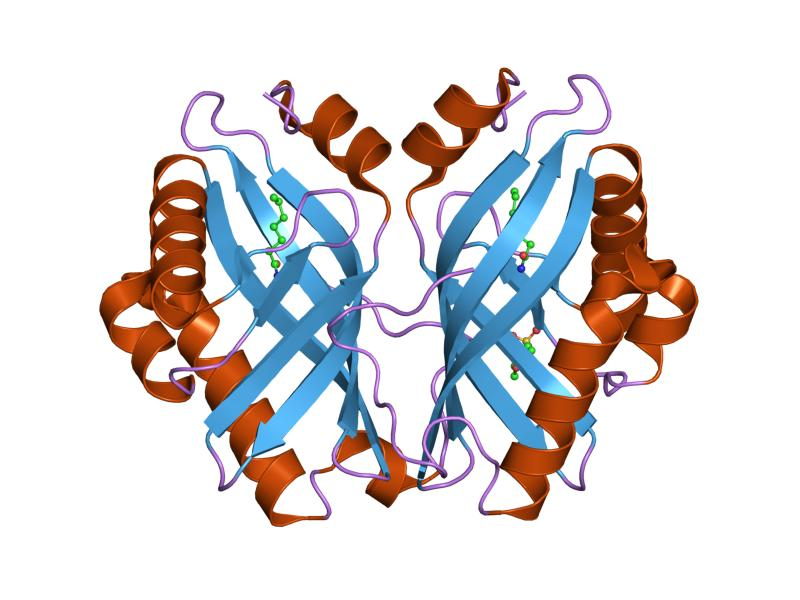
- limonene-1,2-epoxide hydrolase

Identifiers
- Symbol: LEH
- Pfam: PF07858
- Pfam clan: CL0051
- InterPro: IPR013100
- SCOP2: 1nww / SCOPe / SUPFAM
- OPM superfamily: 133
- OPM protein: 2bng
Available protein structures:
- PDB: IPR013100 PF07858 (ECOD; PDBsum)
- AlphaFold: IPR013100; PF07858

limonene-1,2-epoxide hydrolase

Identifiers
- EC no.: 3.3.2.8

Databases
- BRENDA: enzyme data
- ExPASy: NiceZyme view
- KEGG: enzyme entry
- MetaCyc: metabolic pathway
- Rhea: reactions
- PDB structures: RCSB PDB PDBe PDBsum
- Gene Ontology: AmiGO / QuickGO
Search
- PMC: articles
- PubMed: articles
- NCBI: proteins

In enzymology, a limonene-1,2-epoxide hydrolase (EC 3.3.2.8) is an enzyme that catalyzes the chemical reaction

limonene-1,2-epoxide + H_{2}O $\rightleftharpoons$ limonene-1,2-diol

Thus, the two substrates of this enzyme are limonene-1,2-epoxide and H_{2}O, whereas its product is limonene-1,2-diol.

This enzyme is found in the bacterium Rhodococcus erythropolis DCL14, where it plays a role in the limonene degradation pathway that allows the bacteria to catabolize limonene as a carbon and energy source. The enzyme belongs to the family of hydrolases, specifically those acting on ether bonds (ether hydrolases). The systematic name of this enzyme class is limonene-1,2-epoxide hydrolase. This enzyme is also called limonene oxide hydrolase. This enzyme has maximal activity at pH 7 and 50°C, and participates in limonene and pinene degradation.

Epoxide hydrolases catalyze the hydrolysis of epoxides to corresponding diols, which is important in detoxification, synthesis of signal molecules, or metabolism. Limonene-1,2- epoxide hydrolase (LEH) differs from many other epoxide hydrolases (EHs) in its structure and its novel one-step catalytic mechanism. EHs typically contain conserved α/β-hydrolase folds and catalytic residues which aid with epoxide stabilization and its subsequent hydrolysis reaction. However, LEH’s low molecular mass of 16 kDa suggests that it is too small to house these α/β-hydrolase folds and catalytic triad motifs found in other EHs. Moreover, compared to other EHs, LEH accepts a smaller diversity of substrates and is only able to catalyze reactions with limonene-1,2-epoxide, 1-methylcyclohexene oxide, cyclohexene oxide, and indene oxide. Thus, LEH is considered the founding member of a novel EH family, and its mechanistic, structural, and functional details are of special interest.

== Mechanism ==
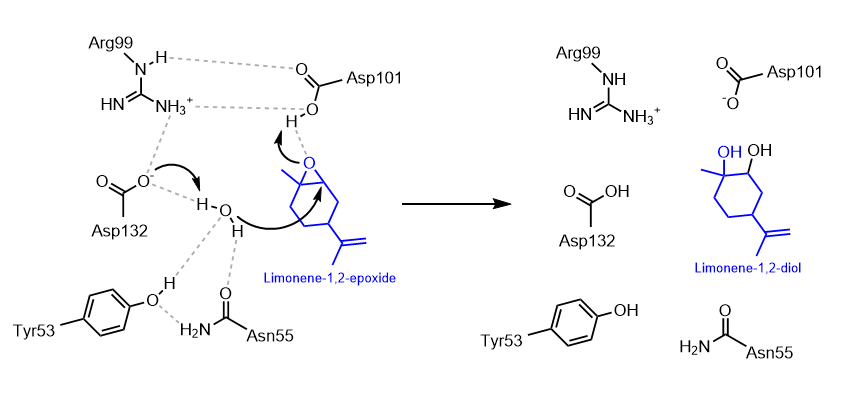
Mechanism of limonene-1,2-epoxide hydrolysis in the active site of limonene-1,2-epoxide hydrolase.

The epoxide hydrolysis of limonene catalyzed by LEH occurs in a one-step mechanism. Nucleophilic water attacks at one of the two electrophilic positions on the epoxide, opening the three-membered ring to create vicinal diols. Quantum-mechanical and molecular-mechanical studies have observed that LEH-mediated hydrolysis preferentially attacks at the most substituted epoxide carbon. The activation energies of attack at the more and less substituted carbons are 16.9 kcal/mol and 25.1 kcal/mol, respectively. These data also suggest that the LEH mechanism is acid-catalyzed, because acidic conditions favor hydrolysis at the more substituted epoxide carbon which has a greater δ+ charge.

The mechanism of LEH hydrolysis does not utilize a covalent enzyme-substrate intermediate, which is distinct from other EHs. However, it does still recruit active site amino acids for acid-base proton exchange and substrate stabilization. According to mutagenesis studies, LEH contains five crucial catalytic residues: Asp101, Arg99, Asp132, Tyr53, and Asn55. The first three catalytic residues form an Asp-Arg-Asp triad that actively donates and accepts protons from substrates in the reaction to drive it forward and help it proceed favorably. Evidence from computational modeling suggests that Asp132 acts to deprotonate water to increase its nucleophilicity in the reaction, while Asp101 protonates the epoxide oxygen to form one of the two alcohols in the diol product. Positively charged Arg99 contributes by stabilizing the negative charges on Asp101 and Asp132. The last two catalytic residues, Tyr53 and Asn55, aid in stabilizing and binding the water molecule via hydrogen bonds to help it achieve the optimal orientation for epoxide attack.

=== Stereochemistry ===
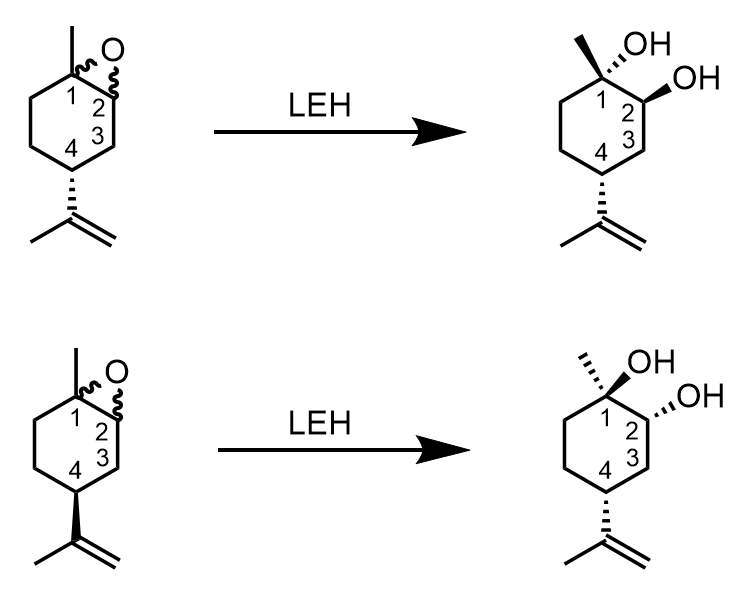
A diagram of the products of limonene-1,2-epoxide hydrolase

The reaction catalyzed by LEH results in selective stereochemistry at its chiral carbons. LEH affords pure enantiomers of the limonene-1,2-diol when given a racemic mixture of the epoxide. When the substrate has an R chiral center at carbon 4 (4R), the product is (1S,2S,4R)-limonene-1,2-diol, regardless of whether the substrate’s epoxide is trans or cis to the substitution on carbon 4. Similarly, a substrate with an S chiral center at carbon 4 (4S) yields only the (1R,2R,4S)-limonene-1,2-diol. Because of the enantioconvergent nature of LEH and its ability to produce a single enantiomeric products, it has significant applications to industrial synthesis.

LEH also has a preference for specific stereoisomers of its substrate. It reacts with all (1R,2S) limonene epoxides before it begins hydrolysis of the (1S,2R) stereoisomers. The presence of (1S,2R) substrates does not decrease the speed of reaction with the preferred stereoisomers, suggesting that the (1S,2R) limonene epoxides are weak competitive inhibitors.

== Structure ==
The crystal structure of LEH contains a six-stranded mixed beta-sheet, with three N-terminal alpha helices packed to one side to create a pocket that extends into the protein core. A fourth helix lies in such a way that it acts as a rim to this pocket. Although mainly lined by hydrophobic residues, this pocket features a cluster of polar groups that lie at its deepest point and constitute the enzyme’s active site. LEH is also a dimer with two subunits at an angle of 179° to each other. The two subunits are largely symmetrical, excluding the amino acids at the N-terminus that are proximal to the main fold.

While the LEH structure is distinct from the majority of EHs, it is not entirely unrecognizable from all of them. For example, epoxide hydrolase Rv2740, native to Mycobacterium tuberculosis, contains an active site and catalytic triad similar to LEH, with three helices packed onto a curved six-stranded beta sheet. Like LEH, it lacks the α/β-hydrolase fold found in most EHs. With this emerging class of enzymes, LEH and similarly unique EHs may be novel tools with large potential for industrial catalysis.
