= Phosphonoacetate hydrolase =

Class of enzymes

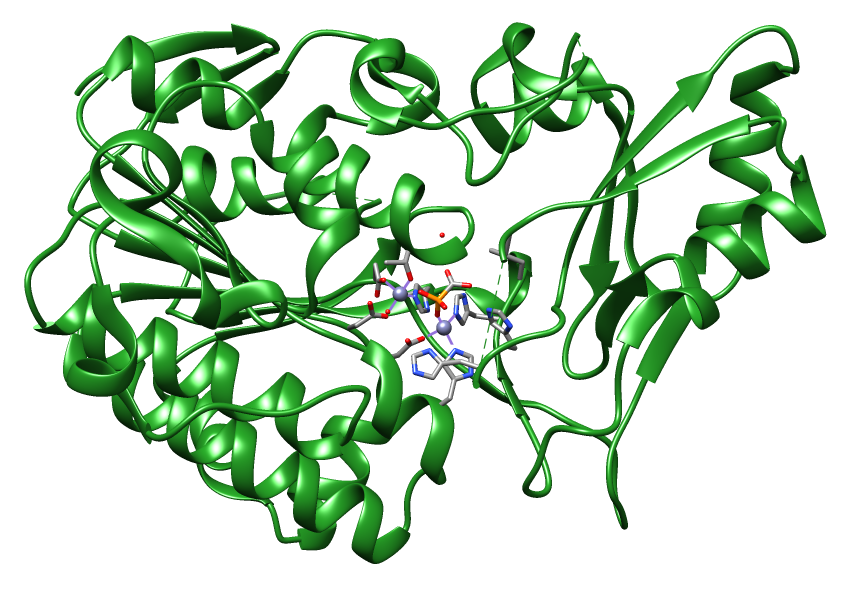
- Structure of phosphonoacetate hydrolase. PDB entry 1e16. Zinc ions and phosphonoformate are shown in the active site.

Identifiers
- EC no.: 3.11.1.2
- CAS no.: 153570-68-4

Databases
- BRENDA: enzyme data
- ExPASy: NiceZyme view
- KEGG: enzyme entry
- MetaCyc: metabolic pathway
- Rhea: reactions
- PDB structures: RCSB PDB PDBe PDBsum
- Gene Ontology: AmiGO / QuickGO
Search
- PMC: articles
- PubMed: articles
- NCBI: proteins

Phosphonoacetate hydrolase (EC 3.11.1.2) is an enzyme characterised from Pseudomonas fluorescens that catalyzes the hydrolysis of phosphonoacetic acid to acetic acid and orthophosphate (P_{i}):

phosphonoacetic acid
H_{2}O
P_{i}
acetic acid

The reaction is part of biochemical pathways that allow soil bacteria to recycle phosphorus.

This enzyme belongs to the family of hydrolases, specifically those acting on carbon-phosphorus bonds. The systematic name of this enzyme class is phosphonoacetate phosphonohydrolase. This enzyme participates in aminophosphonate metabolism. It employs one cofactor, zinc.

== Structural studies ==
The structure of this enzyme, with the PDB accession code PDB: 1EI6, shows it adopts the alkaline phosphatase fold and has a zinc ion, Zn^{2+}, at the active site.
