= Vitamin-K-epoxide reductase (warfarin-insensitive) =

Class of enzymes

vitamin-K-epoxide reductase (warfarin-insensitive)

Identifiers
- EC no.: 1.17.4.5
- CAS no.: 97089-80-0

Databases
- IntEnz: IntEnz view
- BRENDA: BRENDA entry
- ExPASy: NiceZyme view
- KEGG: KEGG entry
- MetaCyc: metabolic pathway
- PRIAM: profile
- PDB structures: RCSB PDB PDBe PDBsum
- Gene Ontology: AmiGO / QuickGO
Search
- PMC: articles
- PubMed: articles
- NCBI: proteins

In enzymology, a vitamin-K-epoxide reductase (warfarin-insensitive) (EC 1.17.4.5) is an enzyme that catalyzes the chemical reaction

3-hydroxy-2-methyl-3-phytyl-2,3-dihydronaphthoquinone + oxidized dithiothreitol $\rightleftharpoons$ 2,3-epoxy-2,3-dihydro-2-methyl-3-phytyl-1,4-naphthoquinone + 1,4-dithiothreitol

Thus, the two substrates of this enzyme are 3-hydroxy-2-methyl-3-phytyl-2,3-dihydronaphthoquinone and oxidized dithiothreitol, whereas its two products are 2,3-epoxy-2,3-dihydro-2-methyl-3-phytyl-1,4-naphthoquinone and 1,4-dithiothreitol.

This enzyme belongs to the family of oxidoreductases, specifically those acting on the CH or CH2 groups of donor with a disulfide as acceptor. The systematic name of this enzyme class is 3-hydroxy-2-methyl-3-phytyl-2,3-dihydronaphthoquinone:oxidized-dithi othreitol oxidoreductase.
