= Caffeine dehydrogenase =

Enzyme

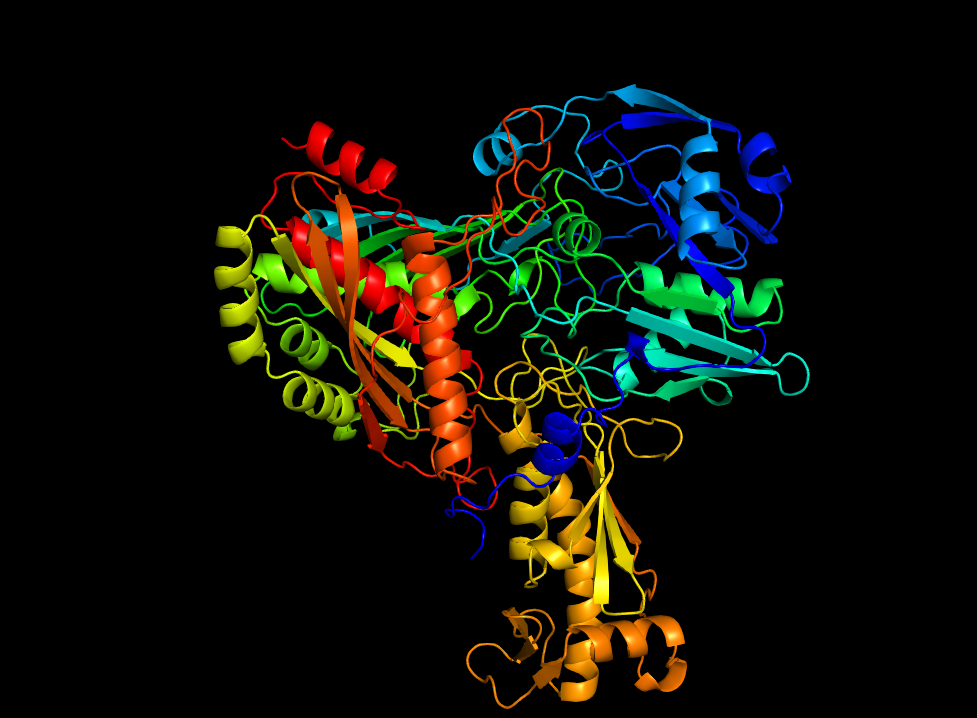
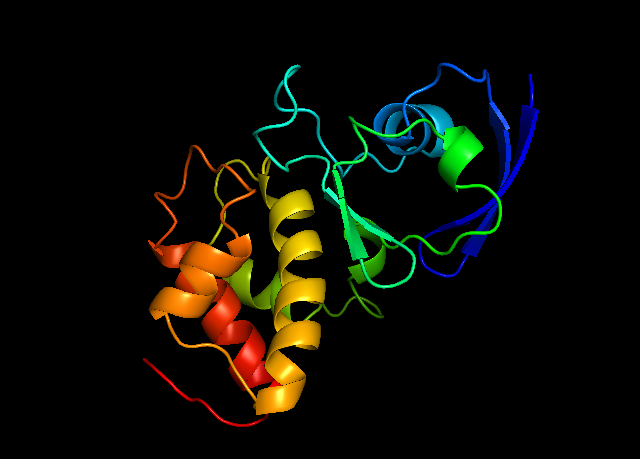

Identifiers
- EC no.: 1.17.5.2

Databases
- IntEnz: IntEnz view
- BRENDA: BRENDA entry
- ExPASy: NiceZyme view
- KEGG: KEGG entry
- MetaCyc: metabolic pathway
- PRIAM: profile
- PDB structures: RCSB PDB PDBe PDBsum
Search
- PMC: articles
- PubMed: articles
- NCBI: proteins

Caffeine dehydrogenase, commonly referred to in scientific literature as caffeine oxidase (EC 1.17.5.2), is an enzyme with the systematic name caffeine:ubiquinone oxidoreductase. The enzyme is most well known for its ability to directly oxidize caffeine, a type of methylxanthine, to trimethyluric acid. Caffeine dehydrogenase can be found in bacterium Pseudomonas sp. CBB1 and in several species within the genera Alcaligenes, Rhodococcus, and Klebsiella.

== Structure ==
Caffeine dehydrogenase found in Pseudomonas sp. CBB1 is a heterotrimer with a αβγ structure and is encoded by the gene cdhA. The alpha subunit is the largest of the three, and the gamma subunit is the smallest. The molecular weights of the alpha, beta, and gamma subunits are 90.0 kD, 40.0 kD, and 20.0 kD respectively. However, caffeine dehydrogenase has also been found as a monomeric structure in Alcaligenes sp. strain CF8 (65 kDa) and a Rhodococcus sp.-Klebsiella sp. mixed-culture consortium. The heterotrimer is noted as being similar to the xanthine dehydrogenase found in Veillonella atypica.

== Reaction ==
In comparison to N-demethylases, another class of caffeine-degrading enzymes, caffeine dehydrogenase does not require the use of oxygen, NAD, or NADP as electron acceptors. Instead, caffeine dehydrogenase uses dichlorophenol, indophenol, coenzyme Q0, and cytochrome c as electron acceptors. Caffeine dehydrogenase has been noted as being more stable as well.

Caffeine dehydrogenase is responsible for catalyzing the oxidation of caffeine directly into trimethyluric acid, and the enzyme uses coenzyme Q0, also known as ubiquinone, as an electron acceptor. This is done by incorporating an oxygen atom from a water molecule into the C-8 position, and the overall reaction can be seen in the following chemical reaction:

caffeine + ubiquinone (Q_{0} ox) + H_{2}O $\rightleftharpoons$ 1,3,7-trimethyluric acid + ubiquinol (Q_{0} red)

The enzyme is specific for caffeine, less active on theobromine, and has no activity on xanthine. The product is stoichiometrically produced from caffeine at a 1:1 molar ratio, and there was no hydrogen peroxide byproduct. Enzyme activity is optimal at pH 7.0 in 50 mM potassium phosphate buffer, and activity increased linearly from 298 K to 339 K.

== Biological function ==
Trimethyluric acid can enter the purine catabolic pathway and further break down into other useful compounds. Trimethyluric acid has been reported to break down further into 3, 6, 8-trimethylallantoin by resting cells in a Rhodococcus and Klebsiella mixed culture.

== Industrial significance ==
Caffeine (1,3,7-trimethylxanthine), the substrate in the above reaction, is a purine alkaloid found in a variety of plant species, such as coffee, cacao, cola, and tea leaves. Caffeine has also been used as a cardiac, neurological, and respiratory stimulant. Because of its prevalence in the modern world in the form of beverages, food, and medicine, caffeine has become one of the world's major agro-industrial wastes. Thus, caffeine has become more noticeable in surface water, groundwater, and waste water effluents all over the world. In addition to being an addictive substance, it has also been shown to lead to adverse health effects, such as irregular sleeping patterns, increase in blood pressure, palpitations, and anxiety.

Decaffeination has been traditionally recommended to reduce caffeine content in food and beverages, but to perform decaffeination by physio-chemical treatments is expensive and can produce other waste that may require further treatment. Thus, microbial bioprocessing has begun to appear more attractive, with bacteria that are capable of metabolizing caffeine being considered. Specifically, bacteria containing caffeine dehydrogenase have been seen as helpful in treating caffeine in agro-industrial wastes of coffee pulps and husks, which can then be used to feed farm animals. In addition, the caffeine dehydrogenase found in Alcaligenes species CF8 may be useful in waste treatment and biosensor development.

Caffeine dehydrogenase, when in the presence of a tetrazolium dye, has been shown to be suitable for detecting caffeine in coffee, soda, and milk due to its high specificity for caffeine. Thus, been used to estimate caffeine levels in pharmaceuticals. However, it has been noted that caffeine dehydrogenase would not be useful in the recovery of methylxanthine intermediates that hold pharmaceutical value since the reaction is only a single step.
