= Nitrogenase (flavodoxin) =

Identifiers
- EC no.: 1.19.6.1
- CAS no.: 2598062

Databases
- IntEnz: IntEnz view
- BRENDA: BRENDA entry
- ExPASy: NiceZyme view
- KEGG: KEGG entry
- MetaCyc: metabolic pathway
- PRIAM: profile
- PDB structures: RCSB PDB PDBe PDBsum
Search
- PMC: articles
- PubMed: articles
- NCBI: proteins

Nitrogenase (flavodoxin) (EC 1.19.6.1) is an enzyme with systematic name reduced flavodoxin:dinitrogen oxidoreductase (ATP-hydrolysing). This enzyme catalyses the following chemical reaction

6 reduced flavodoxin + 6 H^{+} + N_{2} + n ATP $\rightleftharpoons$ 6 oxidized flavodoxin + 2 NH_{3} + n ADP + n phosphate

The enzyme is a complex of two proteins containing iron-sulfur centres and molybdenum.

== See also ==
- Nitrogenase
