= Alkenylglycerophosphocholine hydrolase =

Class of enzymes

alkenylglycerophosphocholine hydrolase

Identifiers
- EC no.: 3.3.2.2
- CAS no.: 37288-65-6

Databases
- IntEnz: IntEnz view
- BRENDA: BRENDA entry
- ExPASy: NiceZyme view
- KEGG: KEGG entry
- MetaCyc: metabolic pathway
- PRIAM: profile
- PDB structures: RCSB PDB PDBe PDBsum
- Gene Ontology: AmiGO / QuickGO
Search
- PMC: articles
- PubMed: articles
- NCBI: proteins

In enzymology, an alkenylglycerophosphocholine hydrolase (EC 3.3.2.2) is an enzyme that catalyzes the chemical reaction

1-(1-alkenyl)-sn-glycero-3-phosphocholine + H_{2}O $\rightleftharpoons$ an aldehyde + sn-glycero-3-phosphocholine

Thus, the two substrates of this enzyme are 1-(1-alkenyl)-sn-glycero-3-phosphocholine and H_{2}O, whereas its two products are aldehyde and sn-glycero-3-phosphocholine.

This enzyme belongs to the family of hydrolases, specifically those acting on ether bonds (ether hydrolases). The systematic name of this enzyme class is 1-(1-alkenyl)-sn-glycero-3-phosphocholine aldehydohydrolase. This enzyme is also called lysoplasmalogenase. This enzyme participates in ether lipid metabolism.
