= Cyclamate sulfohydrolase =

Class of enzymes

Identifiers
- EC no.: 3.10.1.2
- CAS no.: 52228-00-9

Databases
- BRENDA: enzyme data
- ExPASy: NiceZyme view
- KEGG: enzyme entry
- MetaCyc: metabolic pathway
- Rhea: reactions
- PDB structures: RCSB PDB PDBe PDBsum
- Gene Ontology: AmiGO / QuickGO
Search
- PMC: articles
- PubMed: articles
- NCBI: proteins

Cyclamate sulfohydrolase (EC 3.10.1.2) is an enzyme characterised from Pseudomonas species that catalyzes the hydrolysis of cyclamic acid to cyclohexylamine and sulfate:

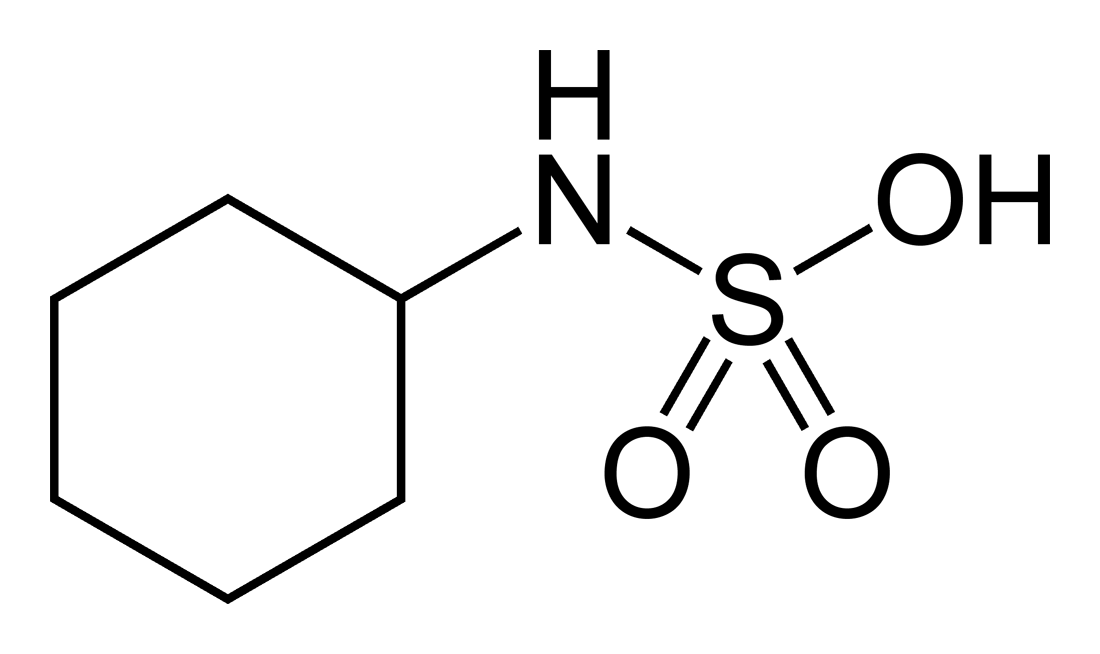
cyclamic acid
H_{2}O
H_{2}SO_{4}
cyclohexylamine

This enzyme is a hydrolase, specifically one acting on sulfur-nitrogen bonds. The systematic name of this enzyme class is cyclohexylsulfamate sulfohydrolase. Other names in common use include cyclamate sulfamatase, cyclamate sulfamidase, and cyclohexylsulfamate sulfamidase.
