= Propanediol-phosphate dehydrogenase =

propanediol-phosphate dehydrogenase

Identifiers
- EC no.: 1.1.1.7
- CAS no.: 9028-15-3

Databases
- BRENDA: enzyme data
- ExPASy: NiceZyme view
- KEGG: enzyme entry
- MetaCyc: metabolic pathway
- Rhea: reactions
- PDB structures: RCSB PDB PDBe PDBsum
- Gene Ontology: AmiGO / QuickGO
Search
- PMC: articles
- PubMed: articles
- NCBI: proteins

In enzymology, a propanediol-phosphate dehydrogenase (EC 1.1.1.7) is an enzyme that catalyzes the chemical reaction

Propanediol 1-phosphate
+ NAD^{+}
H^{+}
H^{+}
Hydroxyacetone phosphate
+ NADH

The two substrates of this enzyme are propane-1,2-diol 1-phosphate and NAD^{+}. Its products are hydroxyacetone phosphate, nicotinamide adenine dinucleotide (NADH), and a proton.

This enzyme belongs to the family of oxidoreductases, specifically those acting on the CH-OH group of donor with NAD^{+} or NADP^{+} as acceptor. The systematic name of this enzyme class is propane-1,2-diol-1-phosphate:NAD^{+} oxidoreductase. Other names in common use include PDP dehydrogenase, 1,2-propanediol-1-phosphate:NAD^{+} oxidoreductase, and propanediol phosphate dehydrogenase.

== Isozymes ==
This type of enzyme activity was reported in rabbits in a pair of papers in 1959 and 1966, but currently no proteins identified with this function are reported in databases like expasy.
