= Phosphonopyruvate hydrolase =

Class of enzymes

Identifiers
- EC no.: 3.11.1.3

Databases
- BRENDA: enzyme data
- ExPASy: NiceZyme view
- KEGG: enzyme entry
- MetaCyc: metabolic pathway
- Rhea: reactions
- PDB structures: RCSB PDB PDBe PDBsum
Search
- PMC: articles
- PubMed: articles
- NCBI: proteins

Phosphonopyruvate hydrolase (EC 3.11.1.3) is an enzyme characterised from Burkholderia cepacia and Variovorax species that catalyzes the hydrolysis of phosphonopyruvic acid to pyruvic acid and orthophosphate (P_{i}):

phosphonopyruvic acid
H_{2}O
P_{i}
pyruvic acid

The reaction is part of biochemical pathways that allow bacteria to recycle phosphorus in the environment.

This enzyme is a hydrolase, specifically one acting on carbon-phosphorus bonds. The systematic name of this enzyme class is '. This enzyme is also called PPH'.
