= (R)-6-hydroxynicotine oxidase =

Class of enzymes

Identifiers
- EC no.: 1.5.3.6
- CAS no.: 37233-46-8

Databases
- BRENDA: enzyme data
- ExPASy: NiceZyme view
- KEGG: enzyme entry
- MetaCyc: metabolic pathway
- Rhea: reactions
- PDB structures: RCSB PDB PDBe PDBsum
- Gene Ontology: AmiGO / QuickGO
Search
- PMC: articles
- PubMed: articles
- NCBI: proteins

In enzymology, a (R)-6-hydroxynicotine oxidase (EC 1.5.3.6) is an enzyme that catalyzes the chemical reaction

(R)-6-hydroxynicotine + H_{2}O + O_{2} $\rightleftharpoons$ 1-(6-hydroxypyridin-3-yl)-4-(methylamino)butan-1-one + H_{2}O_{2}

The 3 substrates of this enzyme are (R)-6-hydroxynicotine, H_{2}O, and O_{2}, whereas its two products are 1-(6-hydroxypyridin-3-yl)-4-(methylamino)butan-1-one and H_{2}O_{2}.

This enzyme belongs to the family of oxidoreductases, specifically those acting on the CH-NH group of donors with oxygen as acceptor. The systematic name of this enzyme class is (R)-6-hydroxynicotine:oxygen oxidoreductase. Other names in common use include D-6-hydroxynicotine oxidase, and 6-hydroxy-D-nicotine oxidase. It employs one cofactor, FAD.

== Structural studies ==
As of late 2007, 3 structures have been solved for this class of enzymes, with PDB accession codes PDB: 2BVF, PDB: 2BVG, and PDB: 2BVH.
