= Citrate (pro-3S)-lyase =

citrate (pro-3S)-lyase
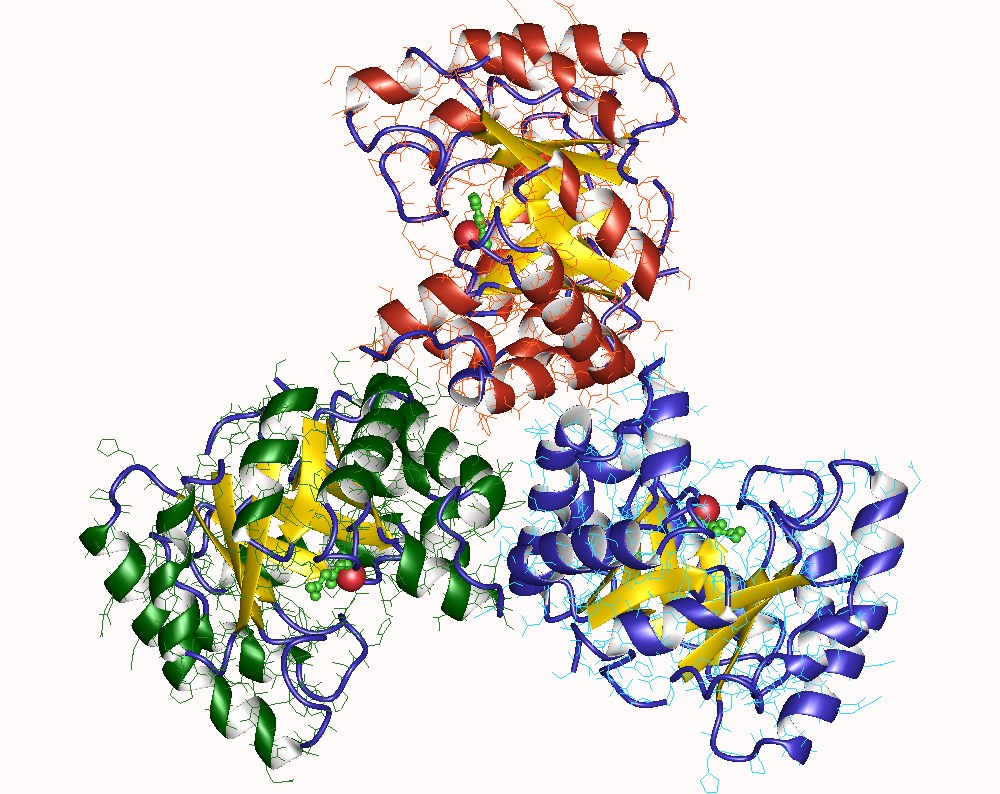

Identifiers
- EC no.: 4.1.3.6
- CAS no.: 9012-83-3

Databases
- IntEnz: IntEnz view
- BRENDA: BRENDA entry
- ExPASy: NiceZyme view
- KEGG: KEGG entry
- MetaCyc: metabolic pathway
- PRIAM: profile
- PDB structures: RCSB PDB PDBe PDBsum
- Gene Ontology: AmiGO / QuickGO
Search
- PMC: articles
- PubMed: articles
- NCBI: proteins

The enzyme citrate (pro-3S)-lyase (EC 4.1.3.6) catalyzes the chemical reaction

citrate $\rightleftharpoons$ acetate + oxaloacetate

This enzyme belongs to the family of lyases, specifically the oxo-acid-lyases, which cleave carbon-carbon bonds. The systematic name of this enzyme class is citrate oxaloacetate-lyase (forming acetate from the pro-S carboxymethyl group of citrate). Other names in common use include citrase, citratase, citritase, citridesmolase, citrate aldolase, citric aldolase, citrate lyase, citrate oxaloacetate-lyase, and citrate oxaloacetate-lyase [(pro-3S)-CH2COO→acetate]. This enzyme participates in citrate cycle and two-component system - general.

== Structural studies ==
As of late 2007, 4 structures have been solved for this class of enzymes, with PDB accession codes 1U5H, 1U5V, 1Z6K, and 2HJ0.
