= Acetate—CoA ligase (ADP-forming) =

Class of enzymes

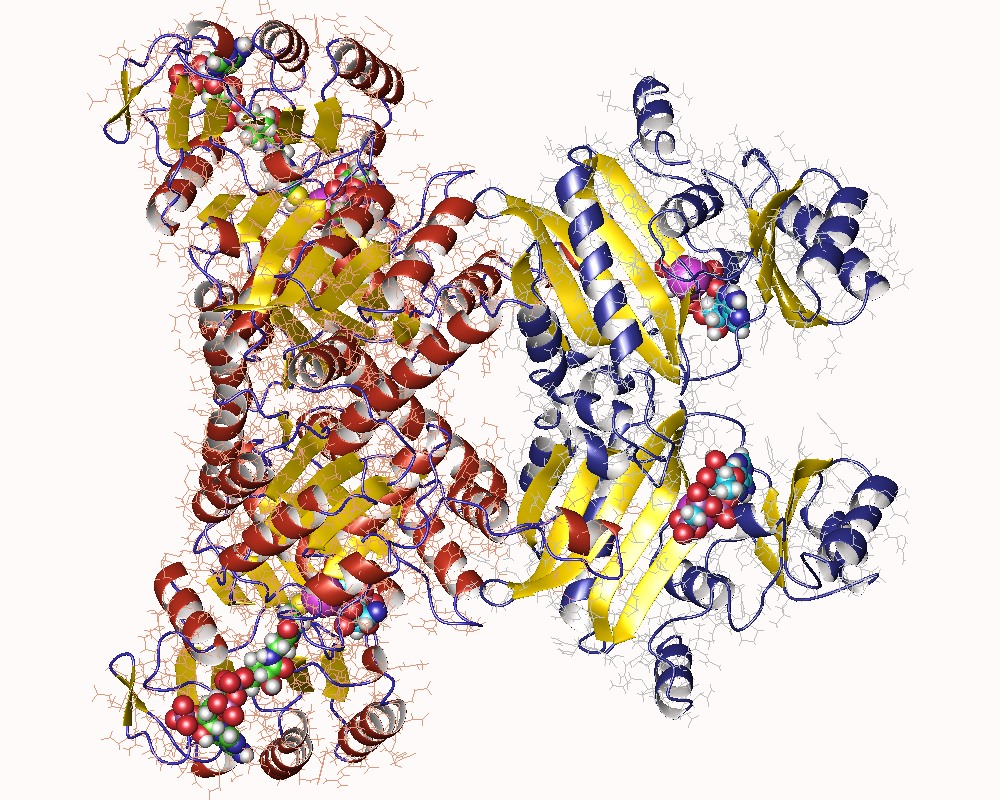
- Acyl-CoA synthetase (NDP forming) heterotetramer, Candidatus Korarchaeum

Identifiers
- EC no.: 6.2.1.13
- CAS no.: 62009-85-2

Databases
- IntEnz: IntEnz view
- BRENDA: BRENDA entry
- ExPASy: NiceZyme view
- KEGG: KEGG entry
- MetaCyc: metabolic pathway
- PRIAM: profile
- PDB structures: RCSB PDB PDBe PDBsum
- Gene Ontology: AmiGO / QuickGO
Search
- PMC: articles
- PubMed: articles
- NCBI: proteins

In enzymology, an acetate—CoA ligase (ADP-forming) (EC 6.2.1.13) is an enzyme that catalyzes the chemical reaction

ATP + acetate + CoA $\rightleftharpoons$ ADP + phosphate + acetyl-CoA

The 3 substrates of this enzyme are ATP, acetate, and CoA, whereas its 3 products are ADP, phosphate, and acetyl-CoA.

This enzyme belongs to the family of ligases, specifically those forming carbon-sulfur bonds as acid-thiol ligases. The systematic name of this enzyme class is acetate:CoA ligase (ADP-forming). Other names in common use include acetyl-CoA synthetase (ADP-forming), acetyl coenzyme A synthetase (adenosine diphosphate-forming), and acetate thiokinase. This enzyme participates in pyruvate metabolism and propanoate metabolism.
