= Sharkula =

American rapper

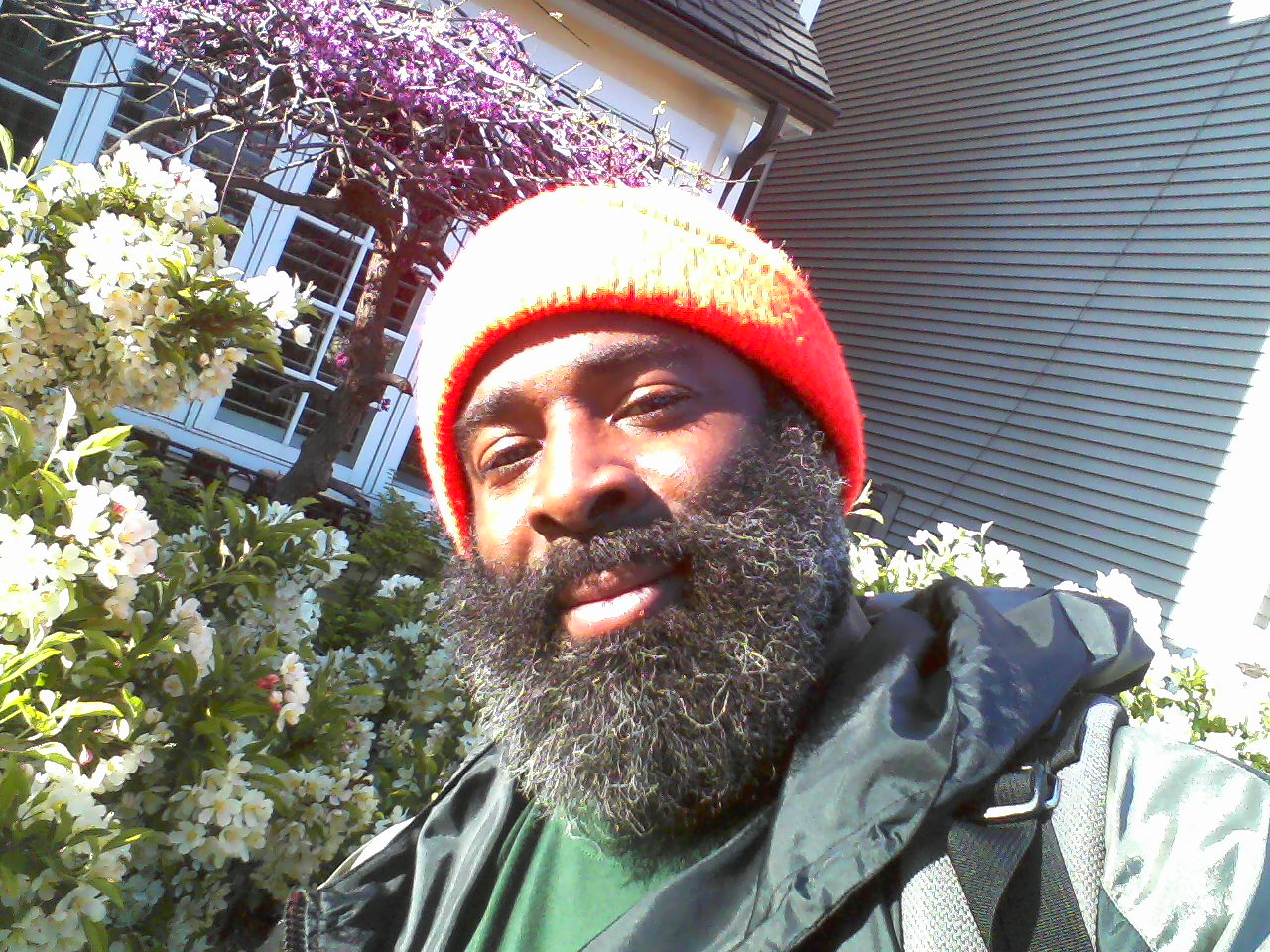
- Sharkula in 2016

Background information
- Born: Brian Wharton
- Origin: Chicago, Illinois, United States
- Genres: Hip hop
- Occupation: Recording artist
- Instrument: Vocals
- Years active: 1987–present
- Website: sharkula.com

Sharkula (born August 27, 1973) (other alter egos include Thig, Brian Wharton, Thigamahjigee, Sherlock Homeboy, Dirty Gilligan) is a Chicago-area rapper. His lyrics are known for being scatterbrained, discontinuous, free-associative, non-violent, apolitical and random. He is also known as a flâneur for promoting his music and shows via use of hand-made flyers and stickers scattered around vending boxes in Chicago, and street marketing often with phrases such as "Hey, you like Hip-Hop?". He has appeared on Chic-a-Go-Go and his album Martin Luther King Jr. Whopper with Cheese was voted by readers of the Chicago Reader as one of the 20 best albums of 2004.

He has collaborated with Willis Earl Beal, who looks up to Sharkula for inspiration.

in 2016, Sharkula was named runner-up best street character of the year by the Chicago Reader.

== Albums ==
- Sharkula w/DJ Felix (2002)
- New 2003 (2003)
- Roaches on the Eyelid
- Musik for to Shady Ass Musik for Yo Soul
- Thank You Chicago
- Sharkula vs. Dookiehead MCs
- Spidermania
- Willo & Thig
- Thig, The Graduate, and Chuck Sunshine Recorded at 2AM (2004)
- The 2004 Mix (2004)
- Martin Luther King Jr. Whopper with Cheese (2004)
- New 2004 (2004)
- The Longmix (2005)
- Lo Fidel Castrol Oil GTX Mixalicious Volume 1 (2005)
- Put Your Fins in the Air (Live at the Sub-T) (2005)
- Thig, The Graduate, and Chuck Sunshine 2005 (2005)
- Session (2006)
- Pyre (2006)
- Just for the Wizzard Haters (2006)
- The 2006 Mix (2006)
- Holy House of Fuck (2006)
- Blizzard Wizzard (2007)
- Kim Gee (2007)
- Hand Palm Spring into Action (2007)
- Paid Our Dues (2007)
- The Universe Hurts (2007)
- Flavor (2007)
- Don't Look Around (2007)
- Don't Look Around / Flavor (2007)
- The Diagnosis of Sharkula (2007)
- Drunk Skunks (2007)
- The Diagnosis of Sharkula (2007, The Secret Life of Sound)
- Computers & Beers (2007)
- New 2008 (2008)
- Awesome Black Mountain (2010)
- Black He-Manula (2013)
- Dirty Caviar (2015)
- Prune City (2019)
- BBQ Fingaprints (2020)

== EPs ==
- Sharkula & Shami EP (2013, re-released 2015)

== Video ==
- Magic Sundays Vol. 1, directed by Joshua Conro
- Magic Sundays Vol. 2, directed by Joshua Conro
- Sharkula Special Edition (2008, DVD)

Sharkula and Director Joshua Conro and Producer PJ Sumroc at the premiere of the film at the Gene Siskel Film Center on August 13, 2010

- Sharkula: Diarrhea of a Madman is a 2010 documentary film directed by Joshua Conro about Chicago-based MC Sharkula.

=== People interviewed in Sharkula: Diarrhea of a Madman ===
- PNS of the Molemen
- J2K of Flosstradamus
- Roburt Reynolds
- R-Rock of the Secret Life of Sound
- Victor Grigas
- Drunk Odd Kid
- PJ Sumroc
- Andrew Barber
- Polo Jay
- Graduate
- Arpad Lep of Jinxremoving Magazine

== Image gallery ==
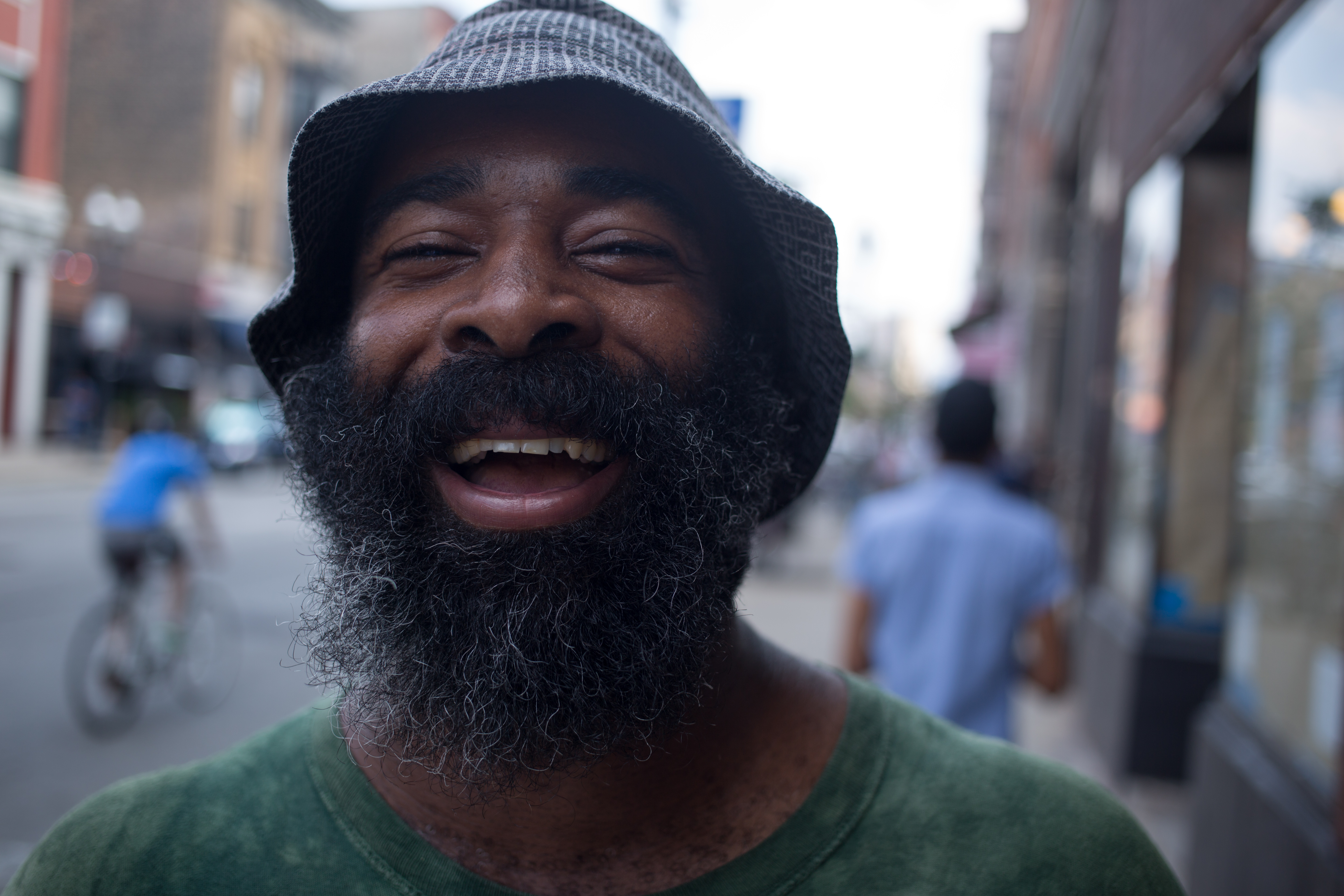
Sharkula in 2015

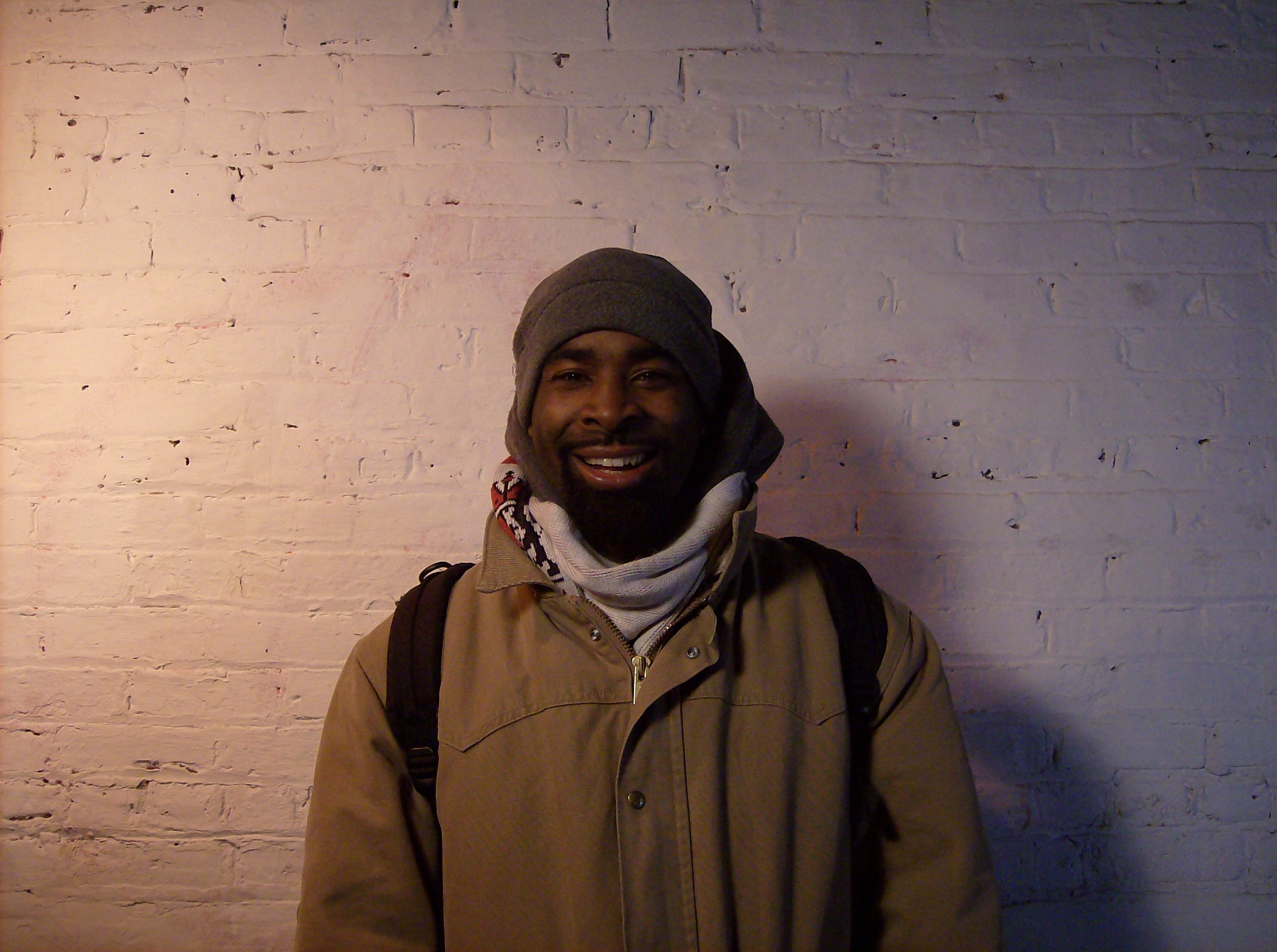
Sharkula

Sharkula on the set of 'School Fools' in 2006

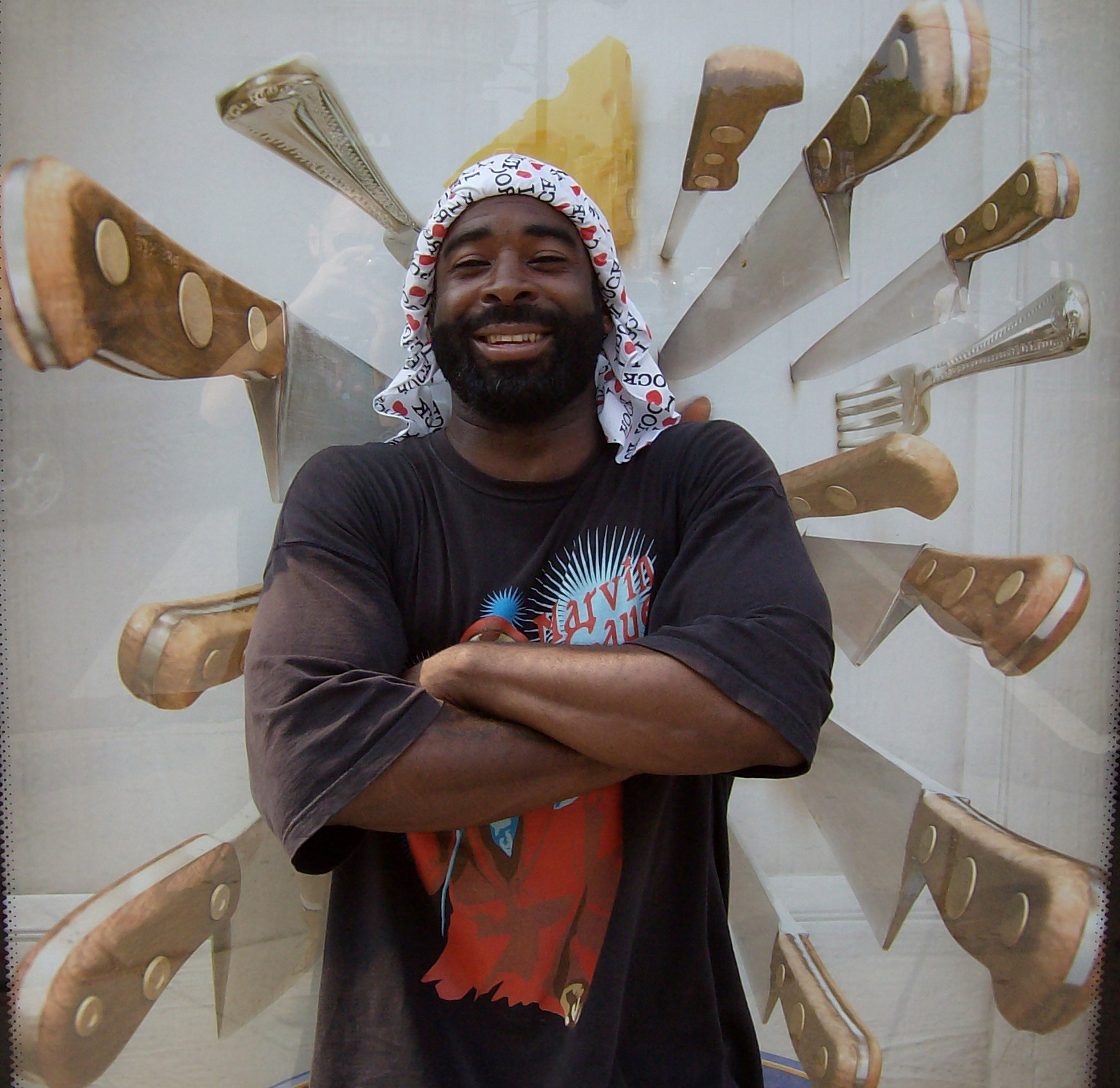
Sharkula on the set of 'School Fools' in 2006
