= Biotin-dependent malonate decarboxylase =

Identifiers
- EC no.: 4.1.1.89

Databases
- IntEnz: IntEnz view
- BRENDA: BRENDA entry
- ExPASy: NiceZyme view
- KEGG: KEGG entry
- MetaCyc: metabolic pathway
- PRIAM: profile
- PDB structures: RCSB PDB PDBe PDBsum
Search
- PMC: articles
- PubMed: articles
- NCBI: proteins

Biotin-dependent malonate decarboxylase (EC 4.1.1.89, malonate decarboxylase (with biotin), malonate decarboxylase) is an enzyme with systematic name malonate carboxy-lyase (biotin-dependent). This enzyme catalyses the following chemical reaction

malonate + H^{+} $\rightleftharpoons$ acetate + CO_{2}

Two types of malonate decarboxylase are currently known, both of which form multienzyme complexes.
