= Nicotinate dehydrogenase (cytochrome) =

Enzyme

Identifiers
- EC no.: 1.17.2.1

Databases
- IntEnz: IntEnz view
- BRENDA: BRENDA entry
- ExPASy: NiceZyme view
- KEGG: KEGG entry
- MetaCyc: metabolic pathway
- PRIAM: profile
- PDB structures: RCSB PDB PDBe PDBsum
Search
- PMC: articles
- PubMed: articles
- NCBI: proteins

Nicotinate dehydrogenase (cytochrome) (EC 1.17.2.1, nicotinic acid hydroxylase, nicotinate hydroxylase) is an enzyme with systematic name nicotinate:cytochrome 6-oxidoreductase (hydroxylating). This enzyme catalyses the following chemical reaction

nicotinate + a ferricytochrome + H_{2}O $\rightleftharpoons$ 6-hydroxynicotinate + a ferrocytochrome + 2 H^{+}

This two-component enzyme from Pseudomonas belongs to the family of xanthine dehydrogenases.

== See also ==
- Nicotinate dehydrogenase
