= Molybdopterin synthase sulfurtransferase =

Identifiers
- EC no.: 2.8.1.11

Databases
- IntEnz: IntEnz view
- BRENDA: BRENDA entry
- ExPASy: NiceZyme view
- KEGG: KEGG entry
- MetaCyc: metabolic pathway
- PRIAM: profile
- PDB structures: RCSB PDB PDBe PDBsum
Search
- PMC: articles
- PubMed: articles
- NCBI: proteins

Molybdopterin synthase sulfurtransferase (EC 2.8.1.11, adenylyltransferase and sulfurtransferase MOCS3, Cnx5 (gene), molybdopterin synthase sulfurylase) is an enzyme with systematic name persulfurated L-cysteine desulfurase:(molybdopterin-synthase sulfur-carrier protein)-Gly-Gly sulfurtransferase. This enzyme catalyses the following chemical reaction

[molybdopterin-synthase sulfur-carrier protein]-Gly-Gly-AMP + [cysteine desulfurase]-S-sulfanyl-L-cysteine $\rightleftharpoons$ AMP + [molybdopterin-synthase sulfur-carrier protein]-Gly-NH-CH2-C(O)SH + cysteine desulfurase

The enzyme transfers sulfur to form a thiocarboxylate moiety on the C-terminal glycine of the small subunit of molybdopterin synthase.
