= Carbonyl sulfide hydrolase =

Hydrolase enzyme

Carbonyl sulfide hydrolase (COSase)

Identifiers
- EC no.: 3.13.1.7

Databases
- BRENDA: enzyme data
- ExPASy: NiceZyme view
- KEGG: enzyme entry
- MetaCyc: metabolic pathway
- Rhea: reactions
- PDB structures: RCSB PDB PDBe PDBsum
- Gene Ontology: AmiGO / QuickGO
Search
- PMC: articles
- PubMed: articles
- NCBI: proteins

Carbonyl Sulfide Hydrolase (COSase)

Identifiers
- Symbol: Carbonyl Sulfide Hydrolase (COSase)
- Pfam: PF00484
- InterPro: IPR036874 IPR001765, IPR036874
- SMART: SM00947
Available protein structures:
- PDB: IPR036874/structure/PDB IPR001765, IPR036874 PF00484 (ECOD; PDBsum)
- AlphaFold: IPR036874/alphafold/ IPR001765, IPR036874; PF00484

Carbonyl sulfide hydrolase (EC 3.13.1.7; abbreviated as COSase) is an enzyme that degrades carbonyl sulfide (COS) to hydrogen sulfide (H_{2}S) and carbon dioxide (CO_{2}). Isolated from Thiobacillus thioparus bacterium, the potential of COSase would reduce the high global warming effect of COS and change the ozone chemistry, because COS is the source of sulfur in the troposphere.

== Etymology ==
Being that it is a hydrolase, which is an enzyme that uses water to break chemical bonds, the name suggests that within the mechanism are water molecules that are involved in disseminating molecules within the reaction. The very name when broken down means that it is an enzyme that breaks down carbonyl sulfide.

== History ==
COSase was isolated, characterized and structure was determined from Thiobacillus thioparus bacterium. In search for a chemical method to break down COS more efficiently than the biologically established methods that employ the soil environment for degradation enzymes. These enzymes are carbonic anhydrase, carbonic disulfide hydrolase, nitrogenase, carbon monoxide, and RuBisCO. The enzymes listed are limited in their use due to specificities and optimal environments, which is why chemical development of an enzyme unique to catalyzing the degradation of COS is researched. - Thiobacillus thioparus is a bacterium found both in soil and freshwater and is known for its sulfur-oxidizing properties. The strain used to create COSase is THI11, which was originally isolated as a thiocyanate degrading microorganism. The enzyme was found by putting the extract of T. thioparus strain THI115 through column chromatography to purify it and ICP-MS to deduce the structure.

== Structure ==
Using sodium dodecyl sulfate–polyacrylamide gel electrophoresis, a subunit molecular mass of 27 kDa was found. After testing for expression in E. coli the true molecular mass of ~94 kDa was found by SEC-MALS. ICP-MS shows that there is one zinc ion per sub unit. 35 amino acid sequence found on the N-terminal: MEKSNTDALLENNRLYAGGQATHRPGHPGMQPIQP. There are five strands (β1−β5) that make up β-sheet core and four α-helices (α1, α2, α3, and α6) in its flank, with two additional helices (α4 and α5) that protrude from its core. They arrange in homodimer pairs to form ten-stranded β-sheets. Between two subunits of a homodimer is the catalytic site. Cys44, His97, Cys 100, and a water molecule coordinate with a zinc ion, with a thiocyanate molecule in the catalytic site pocket.

== Function ==
COSase is responsible for the degradation of COS to H_{2}S and CO_{2} in the second step of SCN_{−} assimilation. It hydrolyzes COS with a certain specificity over a wide range of concentrations both in vivo and in vitro.

== Mechanism ==
Thiocyanate hydrolase (SCNase) found in THI115 initiates enzymatic formation of thiocyanate (SCN^{−}). SCNase hydrolyzes SCN^{−} to ammonia and COS. The COS that results from the hydrolysis is metabolized to form hydrogen sulfide (H_{2}S) which is oxidized to sulfate to produce energy.

Hydroxide and zinc io ns perform a nucleophilic attack on the carbon in the COS molecule, which creates an intermediate with zinc bound to hydroxide oxygen and sulfur of the COS molecule. Oxygen is then released from zinc and forms CO_{2}. Water from the solvent interacts with the su lfur-zinc ion and regenerates the active site and releases H_{2}S.

== Carbonyl sulfide hydrolase inhibitor ==
COSase is weakly inhibited by SCN^{−}.
