= List of enzymes =

Enzymes are listed here by their classification in the International Union of Biochemistry and Molecular Biology's Enzyme Commission (EC) numbering system:

== Category:Oxidoreductases (EC 1) (Oxidoreductase) ==
- Dehydrogenase
- Luciferase
- DMSO reductase

=== Category:EC 1.1 (act on the CH-OH group of donors) ===
- Category:EC 1.1.1 (with NAD^{+} or NADP^{+} as acceptor)
  - Alcohol Dehydrogenase (NAD) EC 1.1.1.1
  - Alcohol Dehydrogenase (NADP) EC 1.1.1.2
  - Homoserine Dehydrogenase EC 1.1.1.3
  - Aminopropanol Oxidoreductase EC 1.1.1.4
  - Diacetyl Reductase EC 1.1.1.5
  - Glycerol Dehydrogenase EC 1.1.1.6
  - Propanediol-Phosphate Dehydrogenase EC 1.1.1.7
  - Glycerol-3-Phoshitiendopene Dehydrogenase (NAD+) EC 1.1.1.8
  - D-xylulose reductase EC 1.1.1.9
  - L-xylulose reductase EC 1.1.1.10
  - Lactate dehydrogenase EC 1.1.1.27
  - Malate dehydrogenase EC 1.1.1.37
  - Isocitrate dehydrogenase EC 1.1.1.42
  - HMG-CoA reductase EC 1.1.1.88
- Category:EC 1.1.2 (with a cytochrome as acceptor)
- Category:EC 1.1.3 (with oxygen as acceptor)
  - Glucose oxidase EC 1.1.3.4
  - L-Gulonolactone oxidase EC 1.1.3.8
  - Thiamine oxidase EC 1.1.3.23
  - Xanthine oxidase EC 1.1.3.32
- Category:EC 1.1.4 (with a disulfide as acceptor)
- Category:EC 1.1.5 (with a quinone or similar compound as acceptor)
- Category:EC 1.1.99 (with other acceptors)

=== Category:EC 1.2 (act on the aldehyde or oxo group of donors) ===
- Category:EC 1.2.1 (with NAD^{+} or NADP^{+} as acceptor)
  - Acetaldehyde dehydrogenase EC 1.2.1.10
  - Glyceraldehyde 3-phosphate dehydrogenase EC 1.2.1.12
  - Pyruvate dehydrogenase EC 1.2.1.51
- Category:EC 1.2.4
  - Oxoglutarate dehydrogenase EC 1.2.4.2

=== Category:EC 1.3 (act on the CH-CH group of donors) ===
- Category:EC 1.3.1 (with NAD^{+} or NADP^{+} as acceptor)
  - Biliverdin reductase EC 1.3.1.24
- Category:EC 1.3.2 (with a cytochrome as acceptor)
- Category:EC 1.3.3 (with oxygen as acceptor)
  - Protoporphyrinogen oxidase EC 1.3.3.4
- Category:EC 1.3.5 (with a quinone or similar compound as acceptor)
- Category:EC 1.3.7 (with an iron–sulfur protein as acceptor)
- Category:EC 1.3.99 (with other acceptors)

=== Category:EC 1.4 (act on the CH-NH_{2} group of donors) ===
- Category:EC 1.4.3
  - Monoamine oxidase EC 1.4.3.4

=== Category:EC 1.5 (act on CH-NH group of donors) ===
- Category:EC 1.5.1 (with NAD^{+} or NADP^{+} as acceptor)
  - Dihydrofolate reductase EC 1.5.1.3
  - Methylenetetrahydrofolate reductase EC 1.5.1.20
- Category:EC 1.5.3 (with oxygen as acceptor)
  - Sarcosine oxidase EC 1.5.3.1
  - (R)-6-hydroxynicotine oxidase EC 1.5.3.6
  - Dihydrobenzophenanthridine oxidase EC 1.5.3.12
- Category:EC 1.5.4 (with a disulfide as acceptor)
- Category:EC 1.5.5 (with a quinone or similar compound as acceptor)
- Category:EC 1.5.7 (with an iron–sulfur protein as acceptor)
- Category:EC 1.5.8 (with a flavin as acceptor)
- Category:EC 1.5.99 (with other acceptors)

=== Category:EC 1.6 (act on NADH or NADPH) ===
- Category:EC 1.6.1 (with NAD^{+} or NADP^{+} as acceptor)
- Category:EC 1.6.2 (with a cytochrome as acceptor)
- Category:EC 1.6.3 (with oxygen as acceptor)
- Category:EC 1.6.4 now Category:EC 1.8.1
- Category:EC 1.6.5 (with a quinone or similar compound as acceptor)
  - NADH dehydrogenase EC 1.6.5.3
- Category:EC 1.6.6 (with a nitrogenous group as acceptor)
- Category:EC 1.6.7 now Category:EC 1.18.1
- Category:EC 1.6.8 now Category:EC 1.5.1
- Category:EC 1.6.99 (with other acceptors)

=== Category:EC 1.7 (act on other nitrogenous compounds as donors) ===
- Category:EC 1.7.1 (with NAD^{+} or NADP^{+} as acceptor)
- Category:EC 1.7.2 (with a cytochrome as acceptor)
- Category:EC 1.7.3 (with oxygen as acceptor)
  - Urate oxidase EC 1.7.3.3
- Category:EC 1.7.7 (with an iron–sulfur protein as acceptor)
- Category:EC 1.7.99 (with other acceptors)
  - Nitrite reductase EC 1.7.99.3
  - Nitrate reductase EC 1.7.99.4

=== Category:EC 1.8 (act on a sulfur group of donors) ===
- Category:EC 1.8.1 (with NAD^{+} or NADP^{+} as acceptor)
  - Glutathione reductase EC 1.8.1.7
  - Thioredoxin reductase EC 1.8.1.9
- Category:EC 1.8.2 (with a cytochrome as acceptor)
- Category:EC 1.8.3 (with oxygen as acceptor)
  - Sulfite oxidase EC 1.8.3.1
- Category:EC 1.8.4 (with a disulfide as acceptor)
- Category:EC 1.8.5 (with a quinone or similar compound as acceptor)
- Category:EC 1.8.6 deleted, included in EC 2.5.1.18
- Category:EC 1.8.7 (with an iron–sulfur protein as acceptor)
- Category:EC 1.8.98 (with other, known, acceptors)
- Category:EC 1.8.99 (with other acceptors)

=== Category:EC 1.9 (act on a heme group of donors) ===
- Category:EC 1.9.3 (with oxygen as acceptor)
  - Cytochrome c oxidase EC 1.9.3.1
- Category:EC 1.9.6 (with a nitrogenous as acceptor)
- Category:EC 1.9.99 transferred, now EC 1.9.98.1

=== Category:EC 1.10 (act on diphenols and related substances as donors) ===
- Category:EC 1.10.1(with NAD^{+} or NADP^{+} as acceptor)
- Category:EC 1.10.2 (with a cytochrome as acceptor)
  - Coenzyme Q - cytochrome c reductase EC 1.10.2.2
- Category:EC 1.10.3 (with oxygen as acceptor)
  - Catechol oxidase EC 1.10.3.1
  - Laccase EC 1.10.3.2
- Category:EC 1.10.99 (with other acceptors)

=== Category:EC 1.11 (act on peroxide as an acceptor -- peroxidases) ===
- Category:EC 1.11.1 (peroxidases)
  - Cytochrome c peroxidase EC 1.11.1.5
  - Catalase EC 1.11.1.6
  - Myeloperoxidase EC 1.11.1.7
  - Thyroid peroxidase EC 1.11.1.8
  - Glutathione peroxidase EC 1.11.1.9

=== Category:EC 1.12 (act on hydrogen as a donor) ===
- Category:EC 1.12.1 (with NAD^{+} or NADP^{+} as acceptor)
- Category:EC 1.12.2 (with a cytochrome as acceptor)
- Category:EC 1.12.5 (with a quinone or similar compound as acceptor)
- Category:EC 1.12.7 (with an iron–sulfur protein as acceptor)
- Category:EC 1.12.98 (with other known acceptors)
- Category:EC 1.12.99 (with other acceptors)

=== Category:EC 1.13 (act on single donors with incorporation of molecular oxygen) ===
- Category:EC 1.13.11 (With incorporation of two atoms of oxygen)
  - 4-hydroxyphenylpyruvate dioxygenase (EC 1.13.11.27)
- Category:EC 1.13.12 (With incorporation of one atom of oxygen (internal monooxygenases or internal mixed function oxidases))
  - Renilla-luciferin 2-monooxygenase EC 1.13.12.5
  - Cypridina-luciferin 2-monooxygenase EC 1.13.12.6
  - Firefly luciferase EC 1.13.12.7
  - Watasenia-luciferin 2-monooxygenase EC 1.13.12.8
  - Oplophorus-luciferin 2-monooxygenase EC 1.13.12.13

=== Category:EC 1.14 (act on paired donors with incorporation of molecular oxygen) ===
- Cytochrome P450 oxidase
- Category:Cytochrome P450
  - Aromatase EC 1.14.14.1
  - CYP2D6 EC 1.14.14.1
  - CYP2E1 EC 1.14.14.1
  - CYP3A4 EC 1.14.14.1
  - Cytochrome P450 oxidase
- Category:EC 1.14.12
  - Nitric oxide dioxygenase
- Category:EC 1.14.13
  - Nitric oxide synthase EC 1.14.13.39
- Category:EC 1.14.14
  - Aromatase EC 1.14.14.1
  - CYP2D6 EC 1.14.14.1
  - CYP2E1 EC 1.14.14.1
  - CYP3A4 EC 1.14.14.1
- Category:EC 1.14.16
  - Phenylalanine hydroxylase EC 1.14.16.1
- Category:EC 1.14.18
  - Tyrosinase EC 1.14.18.1

=== Category:EC 1.15 (act on superoxide radicals as acceptors) ===
- Category:EC 1.15.1
  - Superoxide dismutase EC 1.15.1.1

=== Category:EC 1.16 (oxidize metal ions) ===
- Category:EC 1.16.3
  - Ceruloplasmin EC 1.16.3.1

=== Category:EC 1.17 (act on CH or CH_{2} groups) ===
- Category:EC 1.17.1
  - Leucoanthocyanidin reductase EC 1.17.1.3
  - Xanthine dehydrogenase EC 1.17.1.4
  - Nicotinate dehydrogenase EC 1.17.1.5
  - 4-hydroxy-tetrahydrodipicolinate reductase EC 1.17.1.8
- Category:EC 1.17.2
  - Nicotinate dehydrogenase (cytochrome) EC 1.17.2.1
- Category:EC 1.17.3
  - Xanthine oxidase EC 1.17.3.2
- Category:EC 1.17.4
  - Ribonucleotide reductase EC 1.17.4.1
  - Ribonucleoside-triphosphate reductase EC 1.17.4.2
  - Vitamin K epoxide reductase
  - Vitamin-K-epoxide reductase (warfarin-sensitive) EC 1.17.4.4
  - Vitamin-K-epoxide reductase (warfarin-insensitive) EC 1.17.4.5
  - RRM1
  - RRM2
  - RRM2B
- Category:EC 1.17.5
  - Caffeine dehydrogenase EC 1.17.5.2
- Category:EC 1.17.7
- Category:EC 1.17.99

=== Category:EC 1.18 (act on iron–sulfur proteins as donors) ===
- Category:EC 1.18.6
  - Nitrogenase EC 1.18.6.1

=== Category:EC 1.19 (act on reduced flavodoxin as donor) ===
- Category:EC 1.19.6
  - Nitrogenase (flavodoxin) EC 1.19.6.1

=== Category:EC 1.20 (act on phosphorus or arsenic as donors) ===
- Category:EC 1.20.1
- Category:EC 1.20.2
- Category:EC 1.20.4
  - Arsenate reductase (glutaredoxin) EC 1.20.4.1
  - Glutaredoxin
- Category:EC 1.20.9
- Category:EC 1.20.99

=== Category:EC 1.21 (act on X-H and Y-H to form an X-Y bond) ===
- Category:EC 1.21.1
  - Iodotyrosine deiodinase EC 1.21.1.1
- Category:EC 1.21.3
  - Isopenicillin N synthase EC 1.21.3.1
  - Tetrahydrocannabinolic acid synthase EC 1.21.3.7
- Category:EC 1.21.4
- Category:EC 1.21.99
  - Thyroxine 5-deiodinase EC 1.21.99.3
  - Iodothyronine deiodinase EC 1.21.99.3 and EC 1.21.99.4

=== Category:EC 1.97 (other oxidoreductases) ===
- Category:EC 1.97.1
  - Deiodinase EC 1.97.1.10

== Category:Transferases (EC 2) (Transferase) ==
- Glutathione S-transferase

=== Category:EC 2.1 (transfer one-carbon groups, Methylase) ===
- Category:EC 2.1.1
  - Catechol-O-methyl transferase EC 2.1.1.6
  - DNA methyltransferase EC 2.1.1.72, EC 2.1.1.113, EC 2.1.1.37
  - Histone methyltransferase EC 2.1.1.43, EC 2.1.1.125
- Category:EC 2.1.3
  - Aspartate transcarbamoylase EC 2.1.3.2
  - Ornithine transcarbamoylase EC 2.1.3.3

=== Category:EC 2.2 (transfer aldehyde or ketone groups) ===
- Category:EC 2.2.1
  - Transketolase EC 2.2.1.1
  - Transaldolase EC 2.2.1.2
  - Acetolactate synthase EC 2.2.1.6
  - 2-Succinyl-5-enolpyruvyl-6-hydroxy-3-cyclohexene-1-carboxylic-acid synthase EC 2.2.1.9

=== Category:EC 2.3 (acyltransferases) ===
- Category:EC 2.3.1
  - Aminolevulinic acid synthase EC 2.3.1.37
  - Choline acetyltransferase EC 2.3.1.6
- Category:EC 2.3.2
  - Factor XIII EC 2.3.2.13
  - Gamma glutamyl transpeptidase EC 2.3.2.2
  - Transglutaminase EC 2.3.2.13

=== Category:EC 2.4 (glycosyltransferases) ===
- Category:EC 2.4.2
  - Hypoxanthine-guanine phosphoribosyltransferase EC 2.4.2.8

Category:EC 2.5

- Category:EC 2.5.1
  - Thiaminase EC 2.5.1.2

=== Category:EC 2.5 (transfer alkyl or aryl groups, other than methyl groups) ===
  - Flavin prenyltransferase EC 2.5.1.129

=== Category:EC 2.6 (transfer nitrogenous groups) ===
- Category:EC 2.6.1
  - 4-aminobutyrate—pyruvate transaminase EC 2.6.1.96
  - Alanine transaminase EC 2.6.1.2
  - Aspartate transaminase EC 2.6.1.1

=== Category:EC 2.7 (transfer phosphorus-containing groups) ===
- Category:EC 2.7.2
  - Butyrate kinase (EC 2.7.2.7)

=== Category:EC 2.8 (transfer sulfur-containing groups) ===
- EC 2.8.1.1: Thiosulfate sulfurtransferase
- EC 2.8.1.2: 3-mercaptopyruvate sulfurtransferase
- EC 2.8.1.3: Thiosulfate—thiol sulfurtransferase
- EC 2.8.1.4: tRNA uracil 4-sulfurtransferase
- EC 2.8.1.5: Thiosulfate—dithiol sulfurtransferase
- EC 2.8.1.6: Biotin synthase
- EC 2.8.1.7: Cysteine desulfurase
- EC 2.8.1.8: Lipoyl synthase
- EC 2.8.1.9: Molybdenum cofactor sulfurtransferase
- EC 2.8.1.10: Thiazole synthase
- EC 2.8.1.11: Molybdopterin synthase sulfurtransferase
- EC 2.8.1.12: Molybdopterin synthase
- EC 2.8.1.13: tRNA-uridine 2-sulfurtransferase
- EC 2.8.1.14: tRNA-5-taurinomethyluridine 2-sulfurtransferase
- EC 2.8.1.15: tRNA-5-methyluridine(54) 2-sulfurtransferase

=== Category:EC 2.9 (transfer selenium-containing groups) ===
- EC 2.9.1.1: L-seryl-tRNA(Sec) selenium transferase
- EC 2.9.1.2: O-phospho-L-seryl-tRNA(Sec):L-selenocysteinyl-tRNA synthase

== Category:Hydrolases (EC 3) (Hydrolase) ==
- Hydrolytic enzyme

=== Category:EC 3.1 (act on ester bonds) ===
- Nuclease
- Endonuclease
- Exonuclease
- Category:EC 3.1.1
  - Acid hydrolase
  - Phospholipase A (EC 3.1.1.4)
  - Acetylcholinesterase (EC 3.1.1.7)
  - Cholinesterase (EC 3.1.1.8)
  - Lipoprotein lipase (EC 3.1.1.34)
- Category:EC 3.1.2
  - Ubiquitin carboxy-terminal hydrolase L1 (EC 3.1.2.15)
- Category:EC 3.1.3
  - Phosphatase
  - Alkaline phosphatase (EC 3.1.3.1)
  - Fructose bisphosphatase (EC 3.1.3.11)
- Category:EC 3.1.4
  - Phospholipase C (EC 3.1.4.3)
  - CGMP specific phosphodiesterase type 5 (EC 3.1.4.17)
  - Phospholipase D (EC 3.1.4.50)
  - (3-methyl-2-oxobutanoate dehydrogenase (2-methylpropanoyl-transferring))-phosphatase
- Category:EC 3.1.21
  - Restriction enzyme Type 1 (EC 3.1.21.3)
  - Restriction enzyme Type 2 (EC 3.1.21.4)
  - Restriction enzyme Type 3 (EC 3.1.21.5)
  - Restriction enzyme Type 4 (?)
  - Deoxyribonuclease I (EC 3.1.21.1)
- Category:EC 3.1.26
  - RNase H (EC 3.1.26.4)
- Category:EC 3.1.27
  - Ribonuclease

=== Category:EC 3.2 (act on sugars - glycosylases) ===
- Category:EC 3.2.1
  - Amylase (EC 3.2.1.1)
  - Sucrase (EC 3.2.1.10)
  - Chitinase (EC 3.2.1.14)
  - Lysozyme (EC 3.2.1.17)
  - Maltase (EC 3.2.1.20)
  - Lactase (EC 3.2.1.23)
  - Beta-galactosidase (EC 3.2.1.23)
  - Hyaluronidase (EC 3.2.1.35)

=== Function and clinical importance of some enzymes in category 3.2.1 ===
==== Amylase ====
Function: Amylase is an enzyme that is responsible for the breaking of the bonds in starches, polysaccharides, and complex carbohydrates to be turned into simple sugars that will be easier to absorb.

Clinical Significance: Amylase also has medical history in the use of Pancreatic Enzyme Replacement Therapy (PERT). One of the components is Sollpura (liprotamase), which help in the breakdown of saccharides into simple sugars.

==== Lysozyme ====
Function: An enzyme that is produced by animals that forms part of the innate immune system and is abundant in the secretions of saliva, human milk, tears, and mucus. It functions as an antimicrobial agent by splitting the peptidoglycan component of bacterial cell walls, which then leads to cell death.

Clinical Significance: Toxic levels of blood are caused by the excessive production of lysozyme's by cancer cells. Lysozyme's have also been associated with Bronchopulmonary dysplasia (BPD) in newborns and is a key factor in providing the immunology of infants during breast feeding.

==== Sucrase ====
Function: Sucrase is a stomachs related protein that mobilizes hydrolysis to convert sucrose into glucose and fructose.

Clinical Significance: Low amounts of Sucrose also known as Sucrose intolerance happens when sucrose isn't being discharged in the small digestive tract. A result of this is extra gas.

==== Lactase ====
Function: lactase is located in the small digestives system of people and other creatures such as mammals. Lactase is the bases of the total absorption of milk.

Clinical Significance: People who are lactose intolerant have medicine that can help with the digestion. When you are lactose intolerant you might experience gas, bloating, and pain along with other symptoms regarding your digestive system.

=== Category:EC 3.3 (act on ether bonds) ===
- Category:EC 3.3
- Adenosylmethionine hydrolase
- S-adenosyl-L-homocysteine hydrolase
- Alkenylglycerophosphocholine hydrolase
- Alkenylglycerophosphoethanolamine hydrolase
- Cholesterol-5,6-oxide hydrolase
- Hepoxilin-epoxide hydrolase
- Isochorismatase
- Leukotriene-A4 hydrolase
- Limonene-1,2-epoxide hydrolase
- Microsomal epoxide hydrolase
- Trans-epoxysuccinate hydrolase

=== Category:EC 3.4 (act on peptide bonds - Peptidase) ===
- Category:EC 3.4.11
  - Alanine aminopeptidase
- Category:EC 3.4.15
  - Angiotensin converting enzyme
- Category:EC 3.4.21
  - Serine protease
  - Chymotrypsin (EC 3.4.21.1)
  - Trypsin (EC 3.4.21.4)
  - Thrombin (EC 3.4.21.5)
  - Factor X (EC 3.4.21.6)
  - Plasmin (EC 3.4.21.7)
  - Acrosin (EC 3.4.21.10)
  - Factor VII (EC 3.4.21.21)
  - Factor IX (EC 3.4.21.22)
  - Prolyl oligopeptidase (EC 3.4.21.26)
  - Factor XI (EC 3.4.21.27)
  - Elastase (EC 3.4.21.37)
  - Factor XII (EC 3.4.21.38)
  - Proteinase K (EC 3.4.21.64)
  - Tissue plasminogen activator (EC 3.4.21.68)
  - Protein C (EC 3.4.21.69)
- Category:EC 3.4.22
  - Separase (EC 3.4.22.49)
- Category:EC 3.4.23
  - Pepsin (EC 3.4.23.1)
  - Rennet (EC 3.4.23.4)
  - Renin (EC 3.4.23.15)
  - Trypsinogen (EC 3.4.23.18) and (20/21/23/24/26)
  - Plasmepsin (EC 3.4.23.39)
- Category:EC 3.4.24
  - Matrix metalloproteinase (EC 3.4.24.7)
- Category:EC 3.4.25
  - Metalloendopeptidase

=== Category:EC 3.5 (act on carbon–nitrogen bonds, other than peptide bonds) ===
- Category:EC 3.5.1 (In linear amides)
  - Urease (EC 3.5.1.5)
- Category:EC 3.5.2 (In cyclic amides)
  - Beta-lactamase (EC 3.5.2.6)
- Category:EC 3.5.3 (In linear amidines)
  - Arginase (EC 3.5.3.1)
- Category:EC 3.5.4 (In cyclic amidines)
  - Adenosine deaminase (EC 3.5.4.4)
  - GTP cyclohydrolase I (EC 3.5.4.16)
- Category:EC 3.5.5 (In nitriles)
  - Nitrilase (EC 3.5.5.1)

=== Category:EC 3.6 (act on acid anhydrides) ===
- Category:EC 3.6.1
  - Helicase
  - DnaB helicase
  - RecQ helicase
- Category:EC 3.6.3
  - ATPase
  - NaKATPase (EC 3.6.3.9)
  - ATP synthase (EC 3.6.3.14)

=== Category:EC 3.7 (act on carbon–carbon bonds) ===
- Kynureninase EC 3.7.1.3

=== Category:EC 3.8 (act on halide bonds) ===
- EC 3.8.1.3 Haloacetate dehalogenase

=== Category:EC 3.9 (act on phosphorus–nitrogen bonds) ===
- EC 3.9.1.1: Phosphoamidase
- EC 3.9.1.2: Protein arginine phosphatase
- EC 3.9.1.3: Phosphohistidine phosphatase

=== Category:EC 3.10 (act on sulfur–nitrogen bonds) ===
- EC 3.10.1.1: N-sulfoglucosamine sulfohydrolase
- EC 3.10.1.2: Cyclamate sulfohydrolase

=== Category:EC 3.11 (act on carbon–phosphorus bonds) ===
- EC 3.11.1.1: Phosphonoacetaldehyde hydrolase
- EC 3.11.1.2: Phosphonoacetate hydrolase
- EC 3.11.1.3: Phosphonopyruvate hydrolase

=== Category:EC 3.12 (act on sulfur–sulfur bonds) ===
- EC 3.12.1.1: Trithionate hydrolase

=== Category:EC 3.13 (act on carbon–sulfur bonds) ===
- EC 3.13.1.1: UDP-sulfoquinovose synthase
- EC 3.13.1.3: 2'-hydroxybiphenyl-2-sulfinate desulfinase
- EC 3.13.1.4: 3-sulfinopropanoyl—CoA desulfinase
- EC 3.13.1.5: Carbon disulfide hydrolase
- EC 3.13.1.6: (CysO sulfur-carrier protein)-S-L-cysteine hydrolase
- EC 3.13.1.7: Carbonyl sulfide hydrolase
- EC 3.13.1.8: S-adenosyl-L-methionine hydrolase (adenosine-forming)

== Category:Lyases (EC 4) (Lyase) ==
=== Category:EC 4.1 (carbon–carbon lyases) ===
- Category:EC 4.1.1
  - Ornithine decarboxylase (EC 4.1.1.17)
  - Uridine monophosphate synthetase (EC 4.1.1.23)
  - Aromatic-L-amino-acid decarboxylase (EC 4.1.1.28)
  - RubisCO (EC 4.1.1.39)
- Category:EC 4.1.2
  - Fructose-bisphosphate aldolase (EC 4.1.2.13)

=== Category:EC 4.2 (carbon–oxygen lyases) ===
- Category:EC 4.2.1
  - Carbonic anhydrase (EC 4.2.1.1)
  - Tryptophan synthase (EC 4.2.1.20)

=== Category:EC 4.3 (carbon–nitrogen lyases) ===
- Category:EC 4.3.1
  - Phenylalanine ammonia-lyase (EC 4.3.1.24)

=== Category:EC 4.4 (carbon–sulfur lyases) ===
- Category:EC 4.4.1
  - Cystathionine gamma-lyase
  - Cystathionine beta-lyase
  - Leukotriene C4 synthase

=== Category:EC 4.5 (carbon–halide lyases) ===
- Category:EC 4.5.1
  - Dichloromethane dehalogenase
  - Halohydrin dehalogenase

=== Category:EC 4.6 (phosphorus–oxygen lyases) ===
- Category:EC 4.6.1
  - Adenylate cyclase (EC 4.6.1.1)
  - Guanylate cyclase (EC 4.6.1.2)

== Category:Isomerases (EC 5) (Isomerase) ==
=== Category:EC 5.1 (racemases and epimerases) ===
- Category:EC 5.1.1
- Amino-acid racemase: Phenylalanine racemase (ATP-hydrolysing)
- Serine racemase
- Category:EC 5.1.2
- Mandelate racemase
- Category:EC 5.1.3
- UDP-glucose 4-epimerase
- Category:EC 5.1.99
- Methylmalonyl CoA epimerase

=== Category:EC 5.2 (cis-trans-isomerases) ===
- Category:EC 5.2
- FKBP: FKBP1A
- FKBP1B
- FKBP2
- FKBP3
- FKBP4
- FKBP5
- FKBP6
- FKBP8
- FKBP9
- FKBP10
- FKBPL
- Cyclophilin
- Parvulin
- Prolyl isomerase
- 2-chloro-4-carboxymethylenebut-2-en-1,4-olide isomerase
- Beta-carotene isomerase
- Farnesol 2-isomerase
- Furylfuramide isomerase
- Linoleate isomerase
- Maleate isomerase
- Maleylacetoacetate isomerase
- Maleylpyruvate isomerase
- Parvulin
- Photoisomerase
- Prolycopene isomerase
- Prolyl isomerase
- Retinal isomerase
- Retinol isomerase
- Zeta-carotene isomerase

=== Category:EC 5.3 (intramolecular oxidoreductases) ===
- Category:EC 5.3.3
  - Enoyl CoA isomerase (EC 5.3.3.8)
- Category:EC 5.3.4
  - Protein disulfide isomerase (EC 5.3.4.1)

=== Category:EC 5.4 (intramolecular transferases -- mutases) ===
- Category:EC 5.4.2
  - Phosphoglucomutase (EC 5.4.2.2)

=== Category:EC 5.5 (intramolecular lyases) ===
Intramolecular lyases:
EC number	Examples
EC 5.5.1.1	Muconate cycloisomerase
EC 5.5.1.2	3-carboxy-cis,cis-muconate cycloisomerase
EC 5.5.1.3	Tetrahydroxypteridine cycloisomerase
EC 5.5.1.4	Inositol-3-phosphate synthase
EC 5.5.1.5	Carboxy-cis,cis-muconate cyclase
EC 5.5.1.6	Chalcone isomerase
EC 5.5.1.7	Chloromuconate cycloisomerase
EC 5.5.1.8	(+)-bornyl diphosphate synthase
EC 5.5.1.9	Cycloeucalenol cycloisomerase
EC 5.5.1.10	Alpha-pinene-oxide decyclase
EC 5.5.1.11	Dichloromuconate cycloisomerase
EC 5.5.1.12	Copalyl diphosphate synthase
EC 5.5.1.13	Ent-copalyl diphosphate synthase
EC 5.5.1.14	Syn-copalyl-diphosphate synthase
EC 5.5.1.15	Terpentedienyl-diphosphate synthase
EC 5.5.1.16	Halimadienyl-diphosphate synthase
EC 5.5.1.17	(S)-beta-macrocarpene synthase
EC 5.5.1.18	Lycopene epsilon-cyclase
EC 5.5.1.19	Lycopene beta-cyclase
EC 5.5.1.20	Prosolanapyrone-III cycloisomerase
EC 5.5.1.n1	D-ribose pyranase
EC 5.5.1.22	Steroid Delta Isomerase

=== Category:EC 5.99 (other isomerases) ===
- Category:EC 5.99.1
  - Topoisomerase (type I: EC 5.99.1.2, type II: EC 5.99.1.3)

== Category:Ligases (EC 6) (Ligase) ==
=== Category:EC 6.1 (form carbon–oxygen bonds) ===
6-carboxytetrahydropterin synthase

- Category:EC 6.1.1
  - FARSB (EC 6.1.1.20)

=== Category:EC 6.2 (form carbon–sulfur bonds) ===
- EC 6.2.1.1: Acetate—CoA ligase
- EC 6.2.1.2: Medium-chain acyl—CoA ligase
- EC 6.2.1.3: Long-chain-fatty-acid—CoA ligase
- EC 6.2.1.4: Succinate—CoA ligase (GDP-forming)
- EC 6.2.1.5: Succinate—CoA ligase (ADP-forming)
- EC 6.2.1.6: Glutarate—CoA ligase
- EC 6.2.1.7: Cholate—CoA ligase
- EC 6.2.1.8: Oxalate—CoA ligase
- EC 6.2.1.9: Malate—CoA ligase
- EC 6.2.1.10: Acid—CoA ligase (GDP-forming)
- EC 6.2.1.11: Biotin—CoA ligase
- EC 6.2.1.12: 4-Coumarate—CoA ligase
- EC 6.2.1.13: Acetate—CoA ligase (ADP-forming)
- EC 6.2.1.14: 6-carboxyhexanoate—CoA ligase
- EC 6.2.1.15: Arachidonate—CoA ligase
- EC 6.2.1.16: Acetoacetate—CoA ligase
- EC 6.2.1.17: Propionate—CoA ligase
- EC 6.2.1.18: Citrate—CoA ligase
- EC 6.2.1.19: Long-chain-fatty-acid-luciferin-component ligase
- EC 6.2.1.20: Long-chain-fatty-acid-(acyl-carrier-protein) ligase
- EC 6.2.1.21: Transferred entry: 6.2.1.30
- EC 6.2.1.22: (citrate (pro-3S)-lyase) ligase
- EC 6.2.1.23: Dicarboxylate—CoA ligase
- EC 6.2.1.24: Phytanate—CoA ligase
- EC 6.2.1.25: Benzoate—CoA ligase
- EC 6.2.1.26: o-Succinylbenzoate—CoA ligase
- EC 6.2.1.27: 4-hydroxybenzoate—CoA ligase
- EC 6.2.1.28: 3-alpha,7-alpha-dihydroxy-5-beta-cholestanate—CoA ligase
- EC 6.2.1.29: Transferred entry: 6.2.1.7
- EC 6.2.1.30: Phenylacetate—CoA ligase
- EC 6.2.1.31: 2-furoate—CoA ligase
- EC 6.2.1.32: Anthranilate—CoA ligase
- EC 6.2.1.33: 4-chlorobenzoate—CoA ligase
- EC 6.2.1.34: trans-Feruloyl—CoA synthase
- EC 6.2.1.35: ACP-SH:acetate ligase
- EC 6.2.1.36: 3-hydroxypropionyl-CoA synthase
- EC 6.2.1.37: 3-hydroxybenzoate—CoA ligase
- EC 6.2.1.38: (2,2,3-trimethyl-5-oxocyclopent-3-enyl)acetyl-CoA synthase
- EC 6.2.1.39: (butirosin acyl-carrier protein)—L-glutamate ligase
- EC 6.2.1.40: 4-Hydroxybutyrate—CoA ligase
- EC 6.2.1.41: 3-((3aS,4S,7aS)-7a-methyl-1,5-dioxo-octahydro-1H-inden-4-yl)propanoate—CoA ligase
- EC 6.2.1.42: 3-oxocholest-4-en-26-oate—CoA ligase
- EC 6.2.1.43: 2-hydroxy-7-methoxy-5-methyl-1-naphthoate—CoA ligase
- EC 6.2.1.44: 3-(methylthio)propionyl—CoA ligase
- EC 6.2.1.45: E1 ubiquitin-activating enzyme
- EC 6.2.1.46: L-allo-Isoleucine—holo-CmaA peptidyl-carrier protein ligase
- EC 6.2.1.47: Medium-chain-fatty-acid-(acyl-carrier-protein) ligase
- EC 6.2.1.48: Carnitine—CoA ligase
- EC 6.2.1.49: Long-chain fatty acid adenylyltransferase FadD28
- EC 6.2.1.50: 4-hydroxybenzoate adenylyltransferase FadD22
- EC 6.2.1.51: 4-hydroxyphenylalkanoate adenylyltransferase FadD29
- EC 6.2.1.52: L-Firefly luciferin—CoA ligase
- EC 6.2.1.53: L-Proline—L-prolyl-carrier protein ligase
- EC 6.2.1.54: D-Alanine—D-alanyl-carrier protein ligase
- EC 6.2.1.55: E1 SAMP-activating enzyme

=== Category:EC 6.3 (form carbon–nitrogen bonds) ===
- Glutamine synthetase (EC 6.3.1.2)
- Argininosuccinate synthetase (EC 6.3.4.5)
- CTP synthase (EC 6.3.4.2)

=== Category:EC 6.4 (form carbon–carbon bonds) ===
- Pyruvate carboxylase (EC 6.4.1.1)
- Acetyl-CoA carboxylase (EC 6.4.1.2)

=== Category:EC 6.5 (form phosphoric ester bonds) ===
- DNA ligase (EC 6.5.1.1)

== Other list of enzymes ==
- List of EC numbers (EC 5)
- List of EC numbers (EC 6)
