= Thiazole synthase =

Class of enzymes

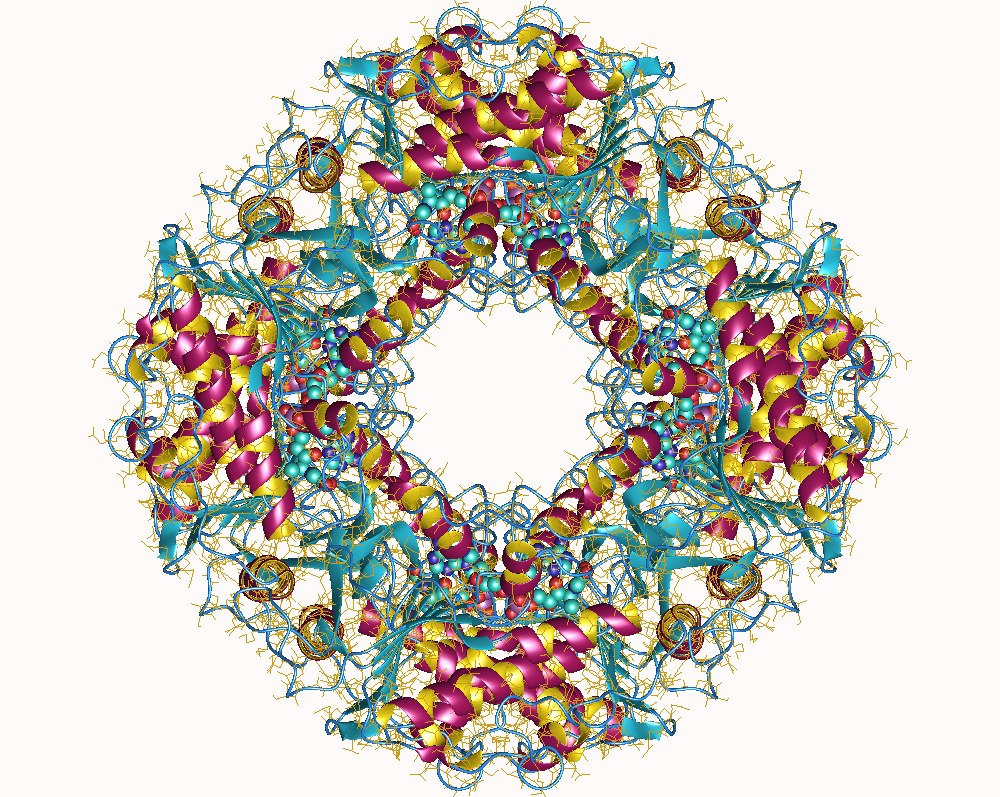
- Thiazole synthase oktamer, Saccharomyces cerevisiae

Identifiers
- EC no.: 2.8.1.10

Databases
- IntEnz: IntEnz view
- BRENDA: BRENDA entry
- ExPASy: NiceZyme view
- KEGG: KEGG entry
- MetaCyc: metabolic pathway
- PRIAM: profile
- PDB structures: RCSB PDB PDBe PDBsum
Search
- PMC: articles
- PubMed: articles
- NCBI: proteins

Thiazole synthase (EC 2.8.1.10, thiG (gene)) is an enzyme with systematic name 1-deoxy-D-xylulose 5-phosphate:thiol sulfurtransferase. This enzyme catalyses the following chemical reaction

1-deoxy-D-xylulose 5-phosphate + 2-iminoacetate + thiocarboxy-adenylate-[sulfur-carrier protein ThiS] $\rightleftharpoons$ 2-[(2R,5Z)-2-carboxy-4-methylthiazol-5(2H)-ylidene]ethyl phosphate + [sulfur-carrier protein ThiS] + 2 H_{2}O

H_{2}S can provide the sulfur in vitro.
