= Protein arginine phosphatase =

Enzyme that catalyzes the dephosphorylation of phosphoarginine residues in proteins

Identifiers
- EC no.: 3.9.1.2

Databases
- BRENDA: enzyme data
- ExPASy: NiceZyme view
- KEGG: enzyme entry
- MetaCyc: metabolic pathway
- Rhea: reactions
- PDB structures: RCSB PDB PDBe PDBsum
Search
- PMC: articles
- PubMed: articles
- NCBI: proteins

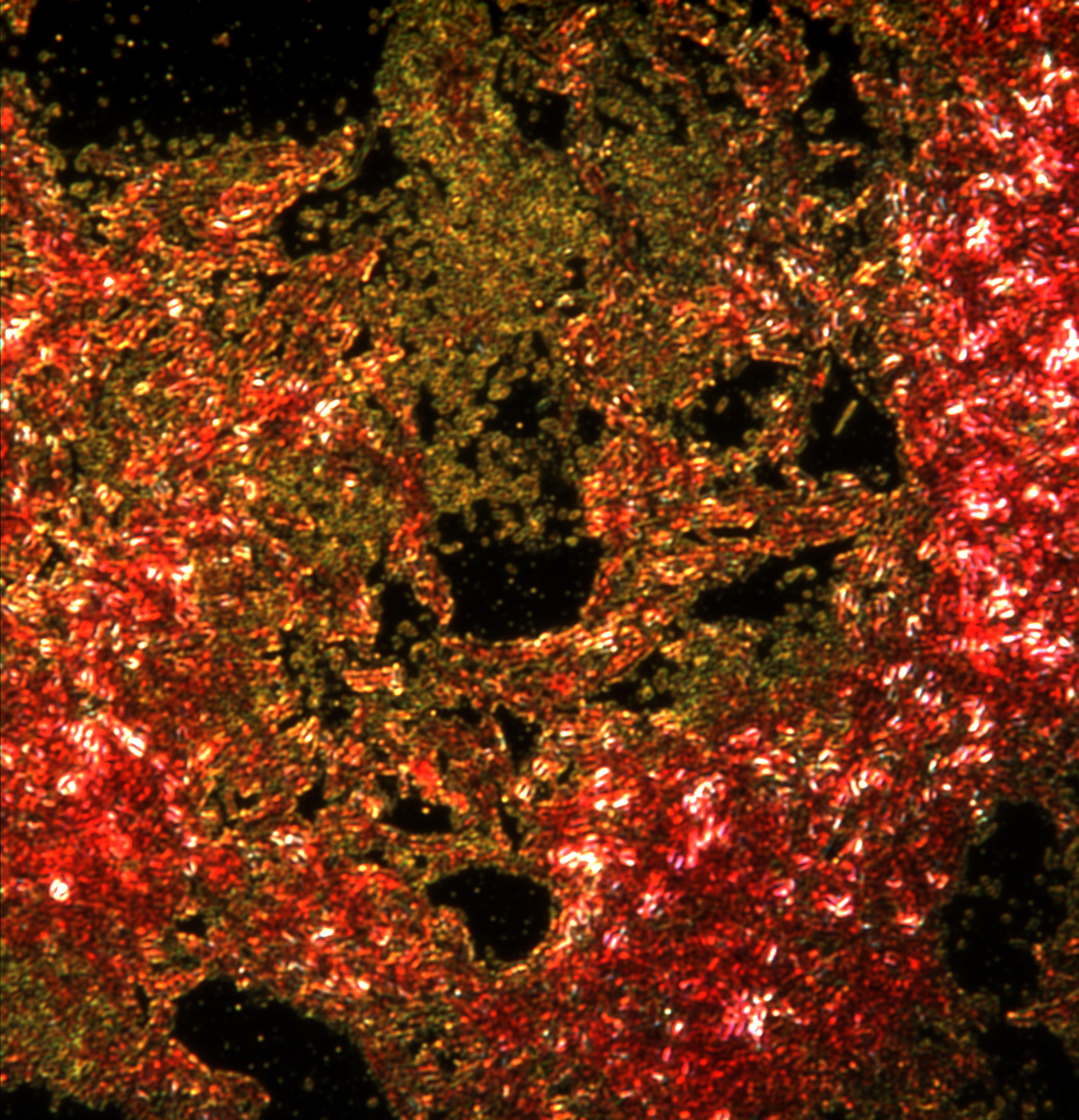
Stained B.Subtilis, a gram-positive bacteria, under a microscope. Image by Farida125 / CC By

Protein Arginine Phosphatase (PAPs), also known as Phosphoarginine Phosphatase, is an enzyme that catalyzes the dephosphorylation of phosphoarginine residues in proteins. Protein phosphatases (PPs) are "obligatory heteromers" made up of two maximum catalytic subunits attached to a non-catalytic subunit. Arginine modification is a post-translational protein modification in gram-positive bacteria. McsB and YwIE were recently identified as phosphorylating enzymes in Bacillus subtilis (B. subtilis). YwIE was thought to be a protein-tyrosine-phosphatase, and McsB a tyrosine-kinase, however in 2012 Elsholz et al. showed that McsB is a protein-arginine-kinase (PAK) and YwlE is a phosphatase-arginine-phosphatase (PAP).

Many proteins rely on protein phosphatase activity for regulating their stability, localization, and interaction with other proteins. Arginine modification is a post-translational protein modification in gram-positive bacteria, and protein arginine phosphorylation regulates transcription factors, in addition to tagging rogue proteins for degradation in gram-positive bacteria. Like phosphorylation, dephosphorylation is a reversible post-translational event. It is reversible through the action of kinases (enzymes that adds a phosphate group to a protein via phosphorylation), and this antagonist activity of phosphorylation and dephosphorylation of proteins controls all aspect of prokaryotic and eukaryotic life. In general, protein phosphatases play a crucial role in cell signaling regulation in both eukaryotes and prokaryotes. They act by removing a phosphate group from proteins, and their activity counteracts that of protein kinases.

== Function ==
YwIE is a member of the low-molecular-weight protein tyrosine phosphatase (LMW-PTP). It is the only active PAP present in B.subtilis, and PAPs exhibits almost no activity against Protein Serine, Protein Tyrosine, and Protein Threonine peptides. Also, YwIE has been shown to play a role in B.Subtilis's resistance to stress. Elsholz et al. (2012), reported in their paper that protein arginine phosphorylation likely plays a critical physiological and regulatory role in bacteria. They showed that protein arginine phosphorylation is involved in the regulation of homeostasis, biofilm formation, motility, competence, stress, and stringent responses by regulating gene expression and protein activity in Bacillus Subtilis. Their results suggested that the combined action of protein arginine phosphatase and kinase allows for rapid and reversible regulation of protein activity. Also, that protein-arginine-phosphatases reverse the effect of protein arginine kinases (PAKs) in living organisms. In B.Subtilis, YwIE, a PAP, counteracts the action of McsB, a protein arginine kinase (PAK). McsB phosphorylates arginine residues in the winged helix-turn-helix domain of CtsR4, preventing it from binding to DNA, allowing for the expression of the repressed gene. However, YwIE is capable of restoring the DNA-binding ability of the CtsR repressor, a stress response & heat shock regulator in B.Subtilis, by reversing the McsB-mediated phosphorylation4. It accomplishes this by dephosphorylating the CtsR Protein. Additionally, McsB and YwIE are capable of differentiating between phosphoarginine and other amino acid residues

=== Known PAPs ===
As of 2020, YwIE is the only known active PAP in B.Subtilis, although Fuhrmann et al. (2013). identified a YwIE homolog in Drosophila, but its role in the species is still unknown. In contrast, Suzuki et al. (2013) identified the presence of McsB in over 150 bacteria species

== Mechanism ==
The specific molecular mechanism of action of the ywIE protein is currently unknown. However, YwIE is believed to dephosphorylate phosphoarginine residues using a concerted, 2-step process via SN2 reactions. Step 1 involves a nucleophilic attack of Cys7 on the phosphorus atom of the phosphoric group. Then a thiophosphate intermediate is formed. In the second step, a phosphorylation-enzyme intermediate is hydrolyzed following the deprotonation of a water molecule by Asp118. Fuhrmann et al. (2016) believe that Asp118 likely promotes the reaction through the stabilization of the positive charge of the amino group via electrostatic interaction.

Sample general dephosphorylation reaction equation: $\ce{H2O + C6H15N4O5P-> C6H14N4O2 + PO4^3-}$

== History ==
=== 2005: YwIE was classified as a tyrosine phosphatase and McsB was identified as a tyrosine Kinase ===
In 2005, Suskiewicz et al. classified the enzyme YwIE as a tyrosine phosphatase. And Kirstein et al. (2005) found that McsB is a tyrosine kinase that needs McsA to become activated. They also found that the interaction of McsA and McsB with CtsR results in the formation of a 3-protein complex that stops the binding of CtsR to its target DNA and leads to subsequent phosphorylation of McsB, McsA, and CtsR.

=== 2009: McsB was unequivocally identified as a protein arginine kinase ===
In their study, Fuhrmann et al. (2009), performed a biochemical and structural analysis of the bacterial transcriptional regulators CtsR/McsB stress response. They sort to clarify and outline the exact function of CtsR and McsB in bacterial stress response. So, they screened proteins from various gram-negative bacteria for recombinant production and succeeded in reconstituting the Bacillus stearothermophilus CtsR/McsB system in vitro. Subsequently, they identified McsB as a protein kinase that targets arginine.

=== 2012: YwlE was identified as a protein arginine phosphatase (PAP) in vivo & McsB was identified as a protein arginine kinase (PAK) ===
Elsholz et al. (2012), showed that McsB and YwlE are a protein arginine kinase and phosphatase, rather than a tyrosine kinase and phosphatase because they observed only an McsB/YwlE-dependent detection of protein arginine phosphorylation or dephosphorylation in vivo. Specifically, they suggested that YwIE acts as a PAP in vivo.

McsB and YwlE were thought to be tyrosine kinases and phosphatases. However, in 2012, Elsholz et al. detected 121 arginine phosphorylation sites in 87 proteins in living Bacillus Subtilis (B.subtillis), a gram-positive bacterium present in soil and human gastrointestinal tract. Their observations led them to believe that protein arginine phosphorylation exists in vivo as a posttranslational modification in bacteria. The arginine-phosphorylated proteins they detected were distributed among "distinct physiological classes of proteins" such as regulators, metabolic enzymes, stress, and ribosomal proteins. This result suggested that YwlE acts as a protein arginine phosphatase that explicitly dephosphorylates arginine residues both in vitro and in vivo

Secondly, Elsholz et al. (2012) were only able to detect protein arginine phosphorylation in a YwIE mutant gene and not the wild-type strain. But protein phosphorylates on either serine, threonine, or tyrosine were detected in both wild-type and a YwIE mutant strain in equal amounts. Therefore, they thought that YwIE might solely act as a protein arginine phosphatase. That is, the detection of protein arginine phosphorylation depended on the presence of YwIE. They confirmed this hypothesis after failing to detect protein arginine phosphorylation after (1) analyzing a mutant extract treated in vitro with purified YwIE protein before conducting mass spectroscopy analysis; and (2) overexpressing the YwIE in trans in a YwIE mutant in-vivo. The close interaction of the arginine phosphorylated proteins with YwIE suggested that the stability of the modifications was indeed influenced by the YwIE protein.
