= Nicotinate dehydrogenase =

Class of enzymes

nicotinate dehydrogenase

Identifiers
- EC no.: 1.17.1.5
- CAS no.: 9059-03-4

Databases
- BRENDA: enzyme data
- ExPASy: NiceZyme view
- KEGG: enzyme entry
- MetaCyc: metabolic pathway
- Rhea: reactions
- PDB structures: RCSB PDB PDBe PDBsum
- Gene Ontology: AmiGO / QuickGO
Search
- PMC: articles
- PubMed: articles
- NCBI: proteins

In enzymology, a nicotinate dehydrogenase (EC 1.17.1.5) is an enzyme that catalyzes the chemical reaction

nicotinate + H_{2}O + NADP^{+} $\rightleftharpoons$ 6-hydroxynicotinate + NADPH + H^{+}

The 3 substrates of this enzyme are nicotinate, H_{2}O, and NADP^{+}, whereas its 3 products are 6-hydroxynicotinate, NADPH, and H^{+}.

== Classification ==
This enzyme belongs to the family of oxidoreductases, specifically those acting on CH or CH_{2} groups with NAD^{+} or NADP^{+} as acceptor.

== Nomenclature ==
The systematic name of this enzyme class is nicotinate:NADP^{+} 6-oxidoreductase (hydroxylating). Other names in common use include nicotinic acid hydroxylase, and nicotinate hydroxylase.

== Biological role ==
This enzyme participates in nicotinate and nicotinamide metabolism. It has 2 cofactors: FAD, and Iron.
