= Peroxin =

Protein families found in peroxisomes

Identifiers
- Symbol: PEX-2,10,12
- Membranome: 190

Peroxin 11

Identifiers
- Symbol: PEX-11
- Pfam: PF05648
- InterPro: IPR008733
- Membranome: 191
Available protein structures:
- PDB: IPR008733 PF05648 (ECOD; PDBsum)
- AlphaFold: IPR008733; PF05648

Peroxin 13

Identifiers
- Symbol: PEX-13
- Pfam: PF04088
- InterPro: IPR007223
- Membranome: 192
Available protein structures:
- PDB: IPR007223 PF04088 (ECOD; PDBsum)
- AlphaFold: IPR007223; PF04088

Peroxin 14

Identifiers
- Symbol: PEX-14
- InterPro: IPR025655
- Membranome: 468
Available protein structures:
- PDB: IPR025655
- AlphaFold: IPR025655

Peroxins (or peroxisomal/peroxisome biogenesis factors) represent several protein families found in peroxisomes. Deficiencies are associated with several peroxisomal disorders. Peroxins serve several functions including the recognition of cytoplasmic proteins that contain peroxisomal targeting signals (PTS) that tag them for transport by peroxisomal proteins to the peroxisome. Peroxins are structurally diverse and have been classified to different protein families. Some of them were predicted to be single-pass transmembrane proteins, for example Peroxisomal biogenesis factor 11.

== Genes ==
- PEX1
- PEX2
- PEX3
- PEX5
- PEX6
- PEX7
- PEX10
- PEX11A, PEX11B, PEX11G
- PEX12
- PEX13
- PEX14
- PEX16
- PEX19
- PEX26
