= Peroxisomal disorder =

- Basic structure of a peroxisome
- Specialty: Medical genetics

Peroxisomal disorders represent a class of medical conditions caused by defects in peroxisome functions. This may be due to defects in single enzymes important for peroxisome function or in peroxins, proteins encoded by PEX genes that are critical for normal peroxisome assembly and biogenesis.

== Peroxisome biogenesis disorders ==
Peroxisome biogenesis disorders (PBDs) include the Zellweger syndrome spectrum (PBD-ZSD) and rhizomelic chondrodysplasia punctata type 1 (RCDP1). PBD-ZSD represents a continuum of disorders including infantile Refsum disease, neonatal adrenoleukodystrophy, and Zellweger syndrome. Collectively, PBDs are autosomal recessive developmental brain disorders that also result in skeletal and craniofacial dysmorphism, liver dysfunction, progressive sensorineural hearing loss, and retinopathy.

PBD-ZSD is most commonly caused by mutations in the PEX1, PEX6, PEX10, PEX12, and PEX26 genes. This results in the over-accumulation of very long chain fatty acids and branched chain fatty acids, such as phytanic acid. In addition, PBD-ZSD patients show deficient levels of plasmalogens, ether-phospholipids necessary for normal brain and lung function.

RCDP1 is caused by mutations in the PEX7 gene, which encodes the PTS2 receptor. RCDP1 patients can develop large tissue stores of branched chain fatty acids, such as phytanic acid, and show reduced levels of plasmalogens.

Name	OMIM	Gene	ICD-10
Zellweger syndrome	214100	PEX1, PEX2, PEX3, PEX5, PEX6, PEX12, PEX14, PEX26	Q87.82
Infantile Refsum disease	266510	PEX1, PEX2, PEX26	E80.3
Neonatal adrenoleukodystrophy	202370	PEX5, PEX1, PEX10, PEX13, PEX26	E71.331
RCDP Type 1	215100	PEX7	Q77.3
Heimler syndrome	234580	PEX1, PEX6	

== Enzyme and transporter defects ==
Peroxisomal disorders also include:

Name	OMIM	Gene	ICD-10 NA
Pipecolic acidemia	600964	PHYH	E80.301
Acatalasia	115500	CAT	E80.310
Hyperoxaluria type 1	259900	AGXT	E80.311
Acyl-CoA oxidase deficiency	264470	ACOX1	E80.313
D-bifunctional protein deficiency	261515	HSD17B4	E80.314
Dihydroxyacetonephosphate acyltransferase deficiency	222765	GNPAT	E80.315
X-linked adrenoleukodystrophy	300100	ABCD1	E71.33
α-Methylacyl-CoA racemase deficiency	604489	AMACR	
RCDP Type 2	222765	DHAPAT	Q77.3
RCDP Type 3	600121	AGPS	Q77.3
Adult Refsum disease-1	266500	PHYH	G60.1
Mulibrey nanism	253250	TRIM37	
