= Zellweger spectrum disorders =

Group of rare genetic disorders

Zellweger spectrum disorders are a group of rare disorders that create the same disease process. The subdivisions of this spectrum are hyperpipecolic acidemia, infantile Refsum disease, neonatal adrenoleukodystrophy, and Zellweger syndrome. It can also be referred to as peroxisomal biogenesis disorders, Zellweger syndrome spectrum, NALD, cerebrohepatorenal syndrome, and ZSS. It can affect many body organs, including the kidneys, eyes, and hearing. It is named after Hans Zellweger.

== Signs and symptoms ==
The symptoms of the disorders can vary from every patient. Most symptoms are noticeable at birth. There is often lack in growth and muscle tone as the child develops. Also the disorders involve neurological problems. This would include frequent seizures, delays in intellectual development, and the absence in basic reflexes.

Facial abnormalities are also often common with patients. Including a small chin, upturned nostrils, and a mouth with a highly arched roof. There are also a variety of eye abnormalities that could happen. The eye abnormalities including clouding of the cataracts and retinopathy, which can lead to vision loss. Children with Zellweger Spectrum disorder can have hearing loss with onset during the first months following birth.

Infants with the disorder can also have abnormalities including their organs. They might have a large spleen or liver, as well as heart defects. Including holes in the heart, and high blood pressure. Due to the lack of muscle tone, infants can face respiratory problems as the disease progresses.

== Causes ==
Zellweger spectrum disorders are a group of autosomal recessive genetic disorders. They are caused due to pathogenic mutations in at least 13 different PEX genes that encode peroxins. It affects the peroxisomes, which are organelles in the body that are meant to breakdown items like acids and toxic compounds. Both parents will have to have the recessive gene for the child to show symptoms. If one parent has the gene and the other one does not, the child will be a carrier and will not show symptoms. Any mutation involving the genes that create or work the peroxisomes can lead to the development of any of the Zellweger Spectrum Disorders. Both genders have an equal chance to end up with these disorders.

== Diagnosis ==
Definite diagnosis requires evaluation of peroxisomal functions. Mutation analysis is done from fibroblast cell lines.

== Treatment ==
Treatment may involve a team of specialists. This would include neurologists, endocrinologists, and pediatricians.

Early intervention is important when treating someone with these disorders. Special education, physical therapy, and other medical services to aid the child through treatment. There are medical trials taking place to learn more about these disorders. Most infants that are diagnosed do not live past 6 months. It can be diagnosed by a blood test looking for PEX genes in the body.

== Epidemiology ==
It occurs in 1 in 50,000 individuals.
