= Zellweger syndrome =

Congenital disorder of nervous system

- Other names: Cerebrohepatorenal syndrome
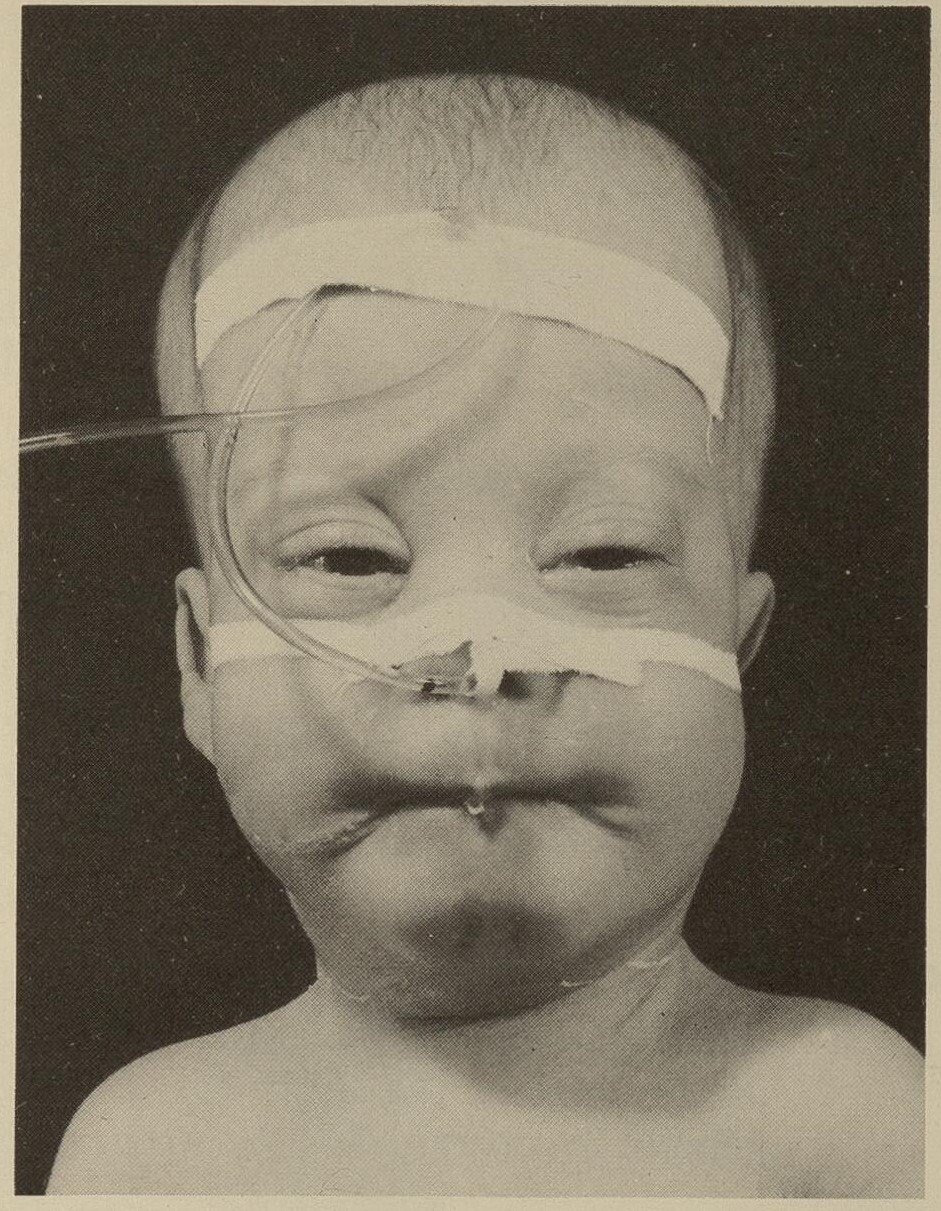
- Infant with Zellweger syndrome
- Specialty: Medical genetics
- Complications: pneumonia and respiratory distress.

Zellweger syndrome is a rare congenital disorder characterized by the reduction or absence of functional peroxisomes in the cells of an individual. It is one of a family of disorders called Zellweger spectrum disorders which are leukodystrophies. Zellweger syndrome is named after Hans Zellweger (1909–1990), a Swiss-American pediatrician, a professor of pediatrics and genetics at the University of Iowa who researched this disorder.

== Signs and symptoms ==
Zellweger syndrome is one of three peroxisome biogenesis disorders that belong to the Zellweger spectrum of peroxisome biogenesis disorders (PBD-ZSD). The other two disorders are neonatal adrenoleukodystrophy (NALD), and infantile Refsum disease (IRD). Although all have a similar molecular basis for disease, Zellweger syndrome is the most severe of these three disorders.

Zellweger syndrome is associated with impaired neuronal migration, neuronal positioning, and brain development. In addition, individuals with Zellweger syndrome can show a reduction in central nervous system (CNS) myelin (particularly cerebral), which is referred to as hypomyelination. Myelin is critical for normal CNS functions, and in this regard, serves to insulate nerve fibers in the brain. Patients can also show postdevelopmental sensorineural degeneration that leads to a progressive loss of hearing and vision.

Zellweger syndrome can also affect the function of many other organ systems. Patients can show craniofacial abnormalities (such as a high forehead, hypoplastic supraorbital ridges, epicanthal folds, midface hypoplasia, and a large fontanelle), hepatomegaly (enlarged liver), chondrodysplasia punctata (punctate calcification of the cartilage in specific regions of the body), eye abnormalities, and renal cysts. Newborns may present with profound hypotonia (low muscle tone), seizures, apnea, and an inability to eat.

== Cause ==
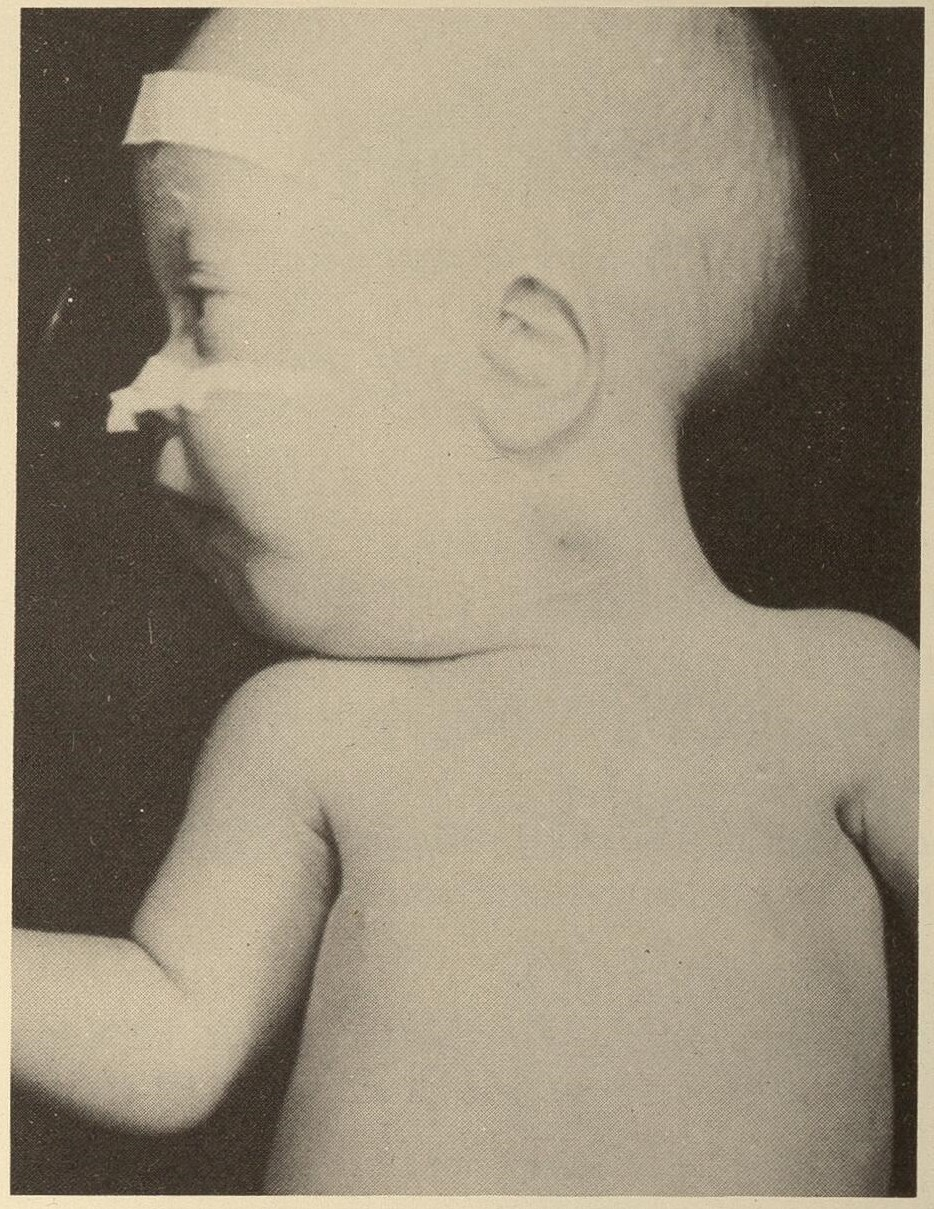
Same Infant with Zellweger syndrome.

Zellweger syndrome is an autosomal recessive disorder caused by mutations in genes that encode peroxins, proteins required for the normal assembly of peroxisomes. Most commonly, patients have mutations in the PEX1, PEX2, PEX3, PEX5, PEX6, PEX10, PEX12, PEX13, PEX14, PEX16, PEX19, or PEX26 genes. In almost all cases, patients have mutations that inactivate or greatly reduce the activity of both the maternal and paternal copies of one these aforementioned PEX genes.

As a result of impaired peroxisome function, an individual's tissues and cells can accumulate very long chain fatty acids (VLCFA) and branched-chain fatty acids (BCFA) that are normally degraded in peroxisomes. The accumulation of these lipids can impair the normal function of multiple organ systems, as discussed above. In addition, these individuals can show deficient levels of plasmalogens, ether-phospholipids that are especially important for brain and lung function. Bile acid synthesis is defective due to lack of side chain modifications; for example, the last steps in the synthesis of chenodeoxycholic acid and cholic acid involve beta-oxidation of the branched side chains of dihydroxycholestanoic acid or trihydroxycholestanoic acid, respectively, by peroxisomal enzymes.

== Diagnosis ==
In addition to genetic tests involving the sequencing of PEX genes, biochemical tests have proven highly effective for the diagnosis of Zellweger syndrome and other peroxisomal disorders. Typically, Zellweger syndrome patients show elevated very long chain fatty acids in their blood plasma. Cultured primary skin fibroblasts obtained from patients show elevated very long chain fatty acids, impaired very long chain fatty acid beta-oxidation, phytanic acid alpha-oxidation, pristanic acid alpha-oxidation, and plasmalogen biosynthesis.

== Treatment ==
The nutrient malabsorption resulting from a lack of bile acids has resulted in elemental formula being suggested for feeding. They are low in fat, with less than 3 percent of calories being derived from long-chain triglycerides (LCT). However, reducing dietary very long chain fatty acids (VLCFA) has not been shown to reduce blood VLCFA levels, likely because humans can endogenously produce most VLCFA. Plasma VLCFA levels are decreased when dietary VLCFA is reduced in conjunction with supplementation of Lorenzo's oil (a 4:1 mixture of glyceryl trioleate and glyceryl trierucate) in X-ALD patients. Since docosahexaenoic acid (DHA) synthesis is impaired [59], DHA supplementation was recommended, but a placebo-controlled study has since shown no clinical efficacy. Due to defective bile acid synthesis, fat-soluble supplements of vitamins A, D, E, and K are recommended.

== Prognosis ==
Currently, no cure for Zellweger syndrome is known, nor is there a standard course of treatment. In November 2023, at five months old, Christopher Donald Miller was the first patient with Zellweger Syndrome in the United States to have a bone marrow transplant. He did pass away at seven months old of veno-occlusive disease. Infections should be guarded against to prevent such complications as pneumonia and respiratory distress. Other treatment is symptomatic and supportive. Patients usually do not survive beyond one year of age.
