= Bile acid synthesis disorders =

Metabolic disorders

- Other names: BASDs
- Symptoms: Jaundice, growth deficiency, vitamin deficiency, cholestasis, steatorrhea
- Usual onset: Infancy to adulthood
- Types: Primary BASDs, secondary BASDs
- Causes: Genetic mutations
- Diagnostic method: Mass spectrometry, genetic testing
- Treatment: Cholic acid, ursodeoxycholic acid, liver transplantation
- Prognosis: Normal life with interventions
- Frequency: 1-9 per 1,000,000

Bile acid synthesis disorders (BASDs) are rare metabolic disorders characterized by defects in the synthesis of bile acids, which are crucial for cholesterol breakdown and the absorption of fats and fat-soluble vitamins. These disorders can lead to the accumulation of abnormal bile acids and intermediary metabolites, causing damage to various organs, especially the liver. BASDS can cause cholestatic liver disease (especially in infancy), interrupting or suppressing the flow of bile from the liver, as well neurological disease that will progressively worsen from childhood and/or adult life.

== Classification ==
Bile acid synthesis disorders may be classified as primary (originating from defects in the genes directly involved in bile acid synthesis) or secondary (from defects in genes for bile acid transport or for synthesis of metabolites needed for bile acid production). Major primary BASDs include 3β-hydroxy-Δ5-C27-steroid oxidoreductase deficiency, caused by mutations in the HSD3B7 gene; Δ4-3-oxosteroid 5β-reductase deficiency, caused by mutations in the gene AKR1D1 and; cerebrotendinous xanthomatosis, among others. These disorders are believed to be inherited in an autosomal recessive fashion.

Secondary BASDs are considered disorders of bile acid transport systems, such as progressive familial intrahepatic cholestasis. Peroxisomal diseases such as Zellweger syndrome and d-bifunctional protein deficiency, also affect bile acid production and may be considered secondary BASDs.

== Symptoms and signs ==
BASDs can generate a range of symptoms, some of which may begin to manifest as early as infancy or early childhood. Jaundice, characterized by yellowing of the skin and eyes, is one common early sign. Growth deficiencies are prevalent condition, with affected individuals often struggling to grow and gain weight properly due to malabsorption of fats and fat-soluble vitamins like A, D, E, and K. This can lead to vitamin deficiencies, resulting in vision problems (vitamin A), rickets (vitamin D), neurological issues (vitamin E), and blood coagulation problems (vitamin K). Patients may experience cholestasis, a condition where bile flow is interrupted, leading to pale stools, dark urine, and sometimes severe itching. Some patients also experience steatorrhea, or excess fat in stools, as a symptom because their bodies are incapable of properly digesting fats. In more severe cases, BASDs can progress to liver failure if untreated. The onset of symptoms can occur at different life stages and their level of severity will vary by genetic defect.

== Diagnosis ==
Physicians often consider diagnosing BASDs as challenging because the disorders are rare and their symptoms are similar to those of other liver diseasesliver diseases. Physicians are inclined to suspect BASDs in infants or children presenting with jaundice, unexplained liver disease, or fat-soluble vitamin deficiencies. Initial laboratory tests often include measuring serum bile acids.

Doctors can use a number of advanced diagnostic techniques involving mass spectrometry, including liquid chromatography-mass spectrometry (LC-MS/MS) and electrospray ionization-tandem mass spectrometry (ESI-MS/MS), to analyze bile acid profiles in urine and blood. These tests are utilized to identify abnormal bile acid patterns suspected to be caused by enzyme deficiencies. Fast atom bombardment-mass spectrometry (FAB-MS) is another technique used to detect specific bile acid patterns indicative of BASDs. Genetic testing is applied to confirm the diagnosis by identifying mutations in genes responsible for bile acid synthesis enzymes.

== Treatment ==
Treatment for BASDs primarily involves oral bile acid replacement therapy. Cholic acid, approved by the U.S. Food and Drug Administration (FDA) in 2015, is the primary treatment for patients with single enzyme defects and peroxisomal disorders. This therapy compensates for the lack of primary bile acids, restoring normal liver function and improving symptoms like jaundice and malabsorption. On the contrary, lifestyle change have not demonstrated any capability as a treatment of the condition.

In some cases, ursodeoxycholic acid may be used alongside cholic acid to enhance bile flow, although it is ineffective as a sole treatment. The dosage of cholic acid is carefully monitored to suppress abnormal metabolite production and improve liver biochemistry.

For patients unresponsive to medical therapy or with advanced liver disease, liver transplantation may be necessary. Early intervention with cholic acid has been shown to prevent progression to liver failure and improve long-term health outcomes, allowing many patients to lead normal lives into adulthood.

== Epidemiology ==
BASDs are thought to account for approximately 1-2% of all childhood cholestatic disorders (neonatal cholestasis). In Europe, a study found a minimum estimated combined prevalence of 1.13 cases per 10 million people for two common types of BASDs:

- 3β-hydroxy-Δ5-C27-steroid dehydrogenase deficiency: 0.99 cases per 10 million
- Δ4-3-oxosteroid 5β-reductase deficiency: 0.14 cases per 10 million

These disorders affect males and females equally and can occur in individuals of any race or ethnicity. The age of onset varies, with presentations possible in infancy, childhood, or adulthood, depending on the specific type of BASD.
