= Heimler syndrome =

- Other names: Deafness-enamel hypoplasia-nail defects syndrome
- Autosomal recessive pattern is the inheritance manner of this condition
- Causes: Mutations in the PEX1 or PEX6 genes

Heimler syndrome is a rare autosomal recessive condition characterized by sensorineural hearing loss, amelogenesis imperfecta, nail abnormalities and occasional or late-onset retinal pigmentation

== Signs and symptoms ==
This condition is characterised by sensorineural hearing loss, enamel hypoplasia of the secondary dentition, nail abnormalities and occasional or late-onset retinal pigmentation abnormalities.

== Genetics ==
This condition is caused by mutations in peroxisomal biogenesis factor 1 (PEX1) or peroxisomal biogenesis factor 6 (PEX6) genes. These gene are involved in peroxisome biogenesis. PEX 1 is located on long arm of chromosome 7 (7q21).2 PEX 6 is located on the short arm of chromosome 6 (6p21). These genes encode AAA+ ATPases. They form part of the mechanism that shuttles the peroxisome targeting signal receptor protein PEX5 back to the cytosol after release of its protein cargo within the peroxisomal lumen.

== Diagnosis ==
The diagnosis is made on clinical grounds and confirmed by gene sequencing.

== Treatment ==
There is no treatment for this condition known at present.

== Prognosis ==
This condition tends to produce only mild abnormalities. Life expectancy is normal.

== Epidemiology ==
This is rare disorder. Precise estimates of its prevalence are not known but it appears be to be < 1/10^{6}

== History ==
This condition was first described in 1991.
