= NALD =

NALD may refer to:

- Neonatal adrenoleukodystrophy
- Non-alcoholic liver disease
- PEX10, peroxisome gene
- PEX13, peroxisome gene
