= Peroxisomal targeting signal =

Recognizable amino acid sequence

In biochemical protein targeting, a peroxisomal targeting signal (PTS) is a region of the peroxisomal protein that receptors recognize and bind to. It is responsible for specifying that proteins containing this motif are localised to the peroxisome.

== Overview ==
All peroxisomal proteins are synthesized in the cytoplasm and must be directed to the peroxisome. The first step in this process is the binding of the protein to a receptor. The receptor then directs the complex to the peroxisome. Receptors recognize and bind to a region of the peroxisomal protein called a peroxisomal targeting signal, or PTS.

Peroxisomes consist of a matrix surrounded by a specific membrane. Most peroxisomal matrix proteins contain a short sequence, usually three amino acids at the extreme carboxy tail of the protein, that serves as the PTS. The prototypic sequence (many variations exist) is serine-lysine-leucine (-SKL in the one-letter amino acid code). This motif, and its variations, is known as the PTS1, and the receptor is termed the PTS1 receptor.

It was found that the PTS1 receptor is encoded by the PEX5 gene. PEX5 imports folded proteins into the peroxisome, shuttling between the peroxisome and cytosol. PEX5 interacts with a large number of other proteins, including Pex8p, 10p, 12p, 13p, 14p.

A few peroxisomal matrix proteins have a different, and less conserved sequence, at their amino termini. This PTS2 signal is recognized by the PTS2 receptor, encoded by the PEX7 gene.

"PEX" refers to a group of genes that were identified as being important for peroxisomal synthesis. The numerical attributions, such as PEX5, generally refer to the order in which they were first discovered.

A distinct motif is used for proteins destined for the peroxisomal membrane called the "mPTS" motif, which is more poorly defined and may consist of discontinuous subdomains. One of these usually is a cluster of basic amino acids (arginines and lysines) within a loop of protein (i.e., between membrane spans) that will face the matrix. The mPTS receptor is the product of PEX19.
