= Woronin body =

Woronin bodies (arrows) immobilized on the cortex of Sordaria fimicola cells as protoplasm streams by.

A Woronin body (named after the Russian botanist Mikhail Stepanovich Woronin) is an organelle found near the septae that divide hyphal compartments in filamentous Ascomycota. It is formed by budding from conventional peroxisomes. Woronin bodies are present in the fungal class Pezizomycotina, which includes species such as Neurospora crassa, Aspergillus fumigatus, and various plant pathogenic fungi, like Zymoseptoria tritici.

Transmission electron microscopy (TEM) reveals Woronin bodies as structures with a dense, proteinaceous core surrounded by a tightly bound unit membrane. The membrane-bound structure contains a dense core made of a protein called HEX-1, which self-assembles into a hexagonal crystal and forms a 3D protein lattice. The size of Woronin bodies range from 100 nm to over 1 μm, consistently exceeding the diameter of the septal pore.

In most species, Woronin bodies are positioned on both sides of the septum and are connected to the pore via a mesh-like tether. Evidence for this tether was strengthened by laser tweezer experiments, which demonstrated that Woronin bodies, when displaced from the septum, return to their original position upon release.

A series of images depicts BUD-6-GFP moving to the septal plug before the hyphae tip repolarizes. BUD-6 and membranous material (stained with FM4-64) assemble around the Woronin body.

One established function of Woronin bodies is the plugging of the septal pores after hyphal wounding, which restricts the loss of cytoplasm to the sites of injury. This plug is reinforced as new material is deposited over the septal plate and on the cytoplasmic side of the Woronin body, consolidating it into a permanent seal. The plugging process occurs rapidly within the mycelium near the site of significant damage.

Woronin bodies can also regulate pore opening and closure, which aids in the control of hyphal heterogeneity. This dynamic function enables the fungus to adapt to changing environmental conditions while maintaining cellular homeostasis by selectively regulating the flow of materials between hyphal compartments.

== Woronin Body Biogenesis ==
Although Woronin bodies were discovered over 140 years ago, understanding of their biogenesis (the process of formation and development) remains incomplete.

Woronin Body biogenesis occurs in the growing apical hyphal compartment, a process determined in part by apically biased hex-1 gene expression. Woronin body formation starts near Glyoxysomes and may occur through fission from them.

=== Biogenesis by peroxisomal protein sorting ===
Three genetic loci are specifically required for the biogenesis of Woronin bodies. These loci encode the core matrix protein HEX-1, its membrane receptor WSC (Woronin sorting complex), and the cytoplasmic tether called Leashin. Woronin bodies are formed in the growing tip of the hyphae, where the hex gene is more actively expressed. Newly made HEX-1 is directed into the peroxisome matrix using a C-terminal peroxisomal-targeting signal, where it self-assembles into large protein clusters. These clusters are wrapped by WSC, a membrane protein with four transmembrane regions, creating budding structures.

Real-time live imaging of GFP-tagged Leashin protein.

HEX-1 and WSC work together to shape and position Woronin bodies. HEX-1 attracts WSC to newly forming Woronin bodies, while WSC helps anchor them to the cell cortex. This anchoring depends on WSC's level in the membrane and its ability to recruit the cytoplasmic protein Leashin, which secures the Woronin bodies at the cortex. Leashin proteins in filamentous fungi are unusually large proteins that tether the Woronin body. It has highly conserved N- and C-terminal regions, and a nonconserved middle region of approximately 2,500 amino acids which contain repetitive sequences that vary between species. These sequences likely determine the distance between the Woronin body and the septal pore (100–200 nm) and provide elasticity to the tether.

These WSC, HEX-1, and Leashin proteins work together to ensure that each compartment of the fungal hypha contains tethered, immobilized Woronin bodies, ready to respond to cellular damage.

If WSC or Leashin is absent, Woronin body development stops, and HEX-1 proteins remain trapped in peroxisomes within the growing hyphal tips. Once the Woronin body is anchored to the cell cortex, PEX-11, a conserved peroxisomal membrane protein, facilitates the separation of the Woronin body from its parent peroxisome.

== HEX-1 Protein ==
The hex-1 gene encodes HEX-1, the major protein first identified as the main component of Woronin bodies. Peroxisomal HEX-1 forms small, crystalline, membrane-bound, hexagonal protein granules that aggregate to maintain the structural integrity of Woronin bodies.

=== HEX-1 in Fungal Species ===
The gene encoding the HEX-1 protein has conserved homologs found in several Pezizomycotina species, such as Neurospora crassa. The hex-1 gene features a conserved intron near their N-terminus, and is believed to have originated from the duplication of the ancestral gene encoding the eukaryotic initiation factor 5A (eIF-5A). Following this duplication, hex-1 evolved a distinct function by acquiring amino acids necessary for peroxisomal targeting and self-assembly. In several fungi, deletion of hex-1 leads to excessive hyphal bleeding after wounding, along with pleiotropic effects on phenotypes related to asexual reproduction, vegetative growth, and stress responses to osmotic and cell wall-perturbing agents. In Neurospora crassa, two forms of the hex-1 gene are activated in more alkaline and low phosphate environments. Studies show that the PacC protein in N. crassa upregulates hex-1 transcription at basic pH (~pH 7.8), influencing the formation of Woronin bodies.

== Microscopy and Imaging Woronin Bodies ==
=== Confocal Microscopy ===
Confocal microscopy is a type of standard fluorescence microscopy that employs specific optical components to produce live, detailed visualization of Woronin bodies stained with fluorescent probes. Dual fluorescence labeling is frequently used, with GFP-tagged RNase T1 marking the septa and DsRed2-tagged HEX-1 protein labeling the Woronin bodies. Woronin bodies appear red in the final 3-D reconstruction image, while septal pores appear as dark regions surrounded by green fluorescence. Under hypotonic shock, red fluorescent Woronin bodies cluster at septal pores adjacent to lysed compartments, plugging them and preventing cytoplasmic leakage. Confocal microscopy is significantly advantageous to scientific research on Woronin bodies as it allows researchers to watch the interaction of Woronin bodies and fungal septa under stress conditions in real time.

=== Scanning Electron Microscopy ===
Scanning electron microscopy (SEM) employs a focused beam of electrons to scan the surface of a fungal specimen, producing images with much higher resolution than optical microscopy.

SEM is regarded as a promising tool for analyzing fungal hyphae, allowing researchers to study cell physiology and how organelles respond to different conditions. For SEM experiments, 48-hour cultures of fungal species are fixed and dehydrated with ethanol. The samples are dried in a desiccator before being placed on a stub covered in carbon conductive tape, sputter-coated with gold, and examined under a scanning electron microscope. The result of this SEM imaging is detailed 3D images of Woronin bodies.

=== Electron Spectroscopic Imaging ===
Electron spectroscopic imaging (ESI) creates images from fungal tissue sections by filtering and transmitting electrons that are inelastically scattered.

Small sections (30-50 nm thick) of fungal tissue are fixed and stained, then examined using a transmission electron microscope equipped with an electron energy loss spectroscopic imaging (EELS) system. Elemental distribution maps are created by measuring energy intensity at specific absorption edges. ESI enables high-resolution imaging of Woronin bodies and surrounding structures, providing detailed structural visualization and analysis of elemental composition.
