= Acatalasia =

- Other names: Acatalasemia, or Takahara's disease
- Basic structure of a peroxisome
- Specialty: Endocrinology

Acatalasia is an autosomal recessive peroxisomal disorder caused by absent or very low levels of the enzyme catalase. Catalase breaks down hydrogen peroxide in cells into water and oxygen. Low levels of catalase can cause hydrogen peroxide to build up, causing damage to cells.

== Signs and symptoms ==
The disorder is relatively benign, although it causes an increased incidence of oral ulcers, and can under rare circumstances lead to gangrene. Symptoms primarily affect children.

== Causes ==
Acatalasia is often the result of mutations in both copies of the CAT gene which codes for the enzyme catalase. There are multiple types of mutation that can cause this condition. Inheriting a single CAT mutation results in hypocatalasia, in which catalase levels are reduced, but still at functional levels.

== Diagnosis ==
This disorder is commonly diagnosed pouring hydrogen peroxide on the patient's blood sample. Instead of a very bubbling reaction, blood turns brown-colored, which means the patient suffers from acatalasia.

== Epidemiology ==
In parts of Japan, approximately 1.4% of people were found to be heterozygous carriers for this condition. Researchers estimate that the condition occurs in 1 in 20,000 people in Hungary and Switzerland.

== History ==
In 1948, Dr. Shigeo Takahara (1908–1994), a Japanese otolaryngologist first reported this new disease. He had examined a patient with an oral ulcer. He had spread hydrogen peroxide on the diseased part, but oxygen was not generated due to the lack of catalase.

== See also ==
- List of cutaneous conditions
