= Rhizomelic chondrodysplasia punctata =

Recessive genetic condition

- Low levels of plasmalogens is a characteristic of rhizomelic chondrodysplasia punctata.
- Specialty: Medical genetics
- Symptoms: Alopecia, flat face
- Causes: PEX7 gene, GNPAT gene and AGPS gene mutations
- Diagnostic method: Clinical and radiologic finding
- Treatment: Physical therapy

Rhizomelic chondrodysplasia punctata is a rare developmental brain disorder characterized by abnormally short arms and legs (rhizomelia), seizures, recurrent respiratory tract infections and congenital cataracts.

The cause is a genetic mutation that results in low levels of plasmalogens, which are a type of lipid found in cell membranes throughout the body, but whose function is not known.

== Signs and symptoms ==
Rhizomelic chondrodysplasia punctata has the following symptoms:

- Bilateral shortening of the femur, resulting in short legs
- Post-natal growth problems (deficiency)
- Cataracts
- Intellectual disability
- Possible seizures
- Possible infections of respiratory tract

== Genetics ==
This condition is a consequence of mutations in the PEX7 gene, the GNPAT gene (which is located on chromosome 1) or the AGPS gene. The condition is acquired in an autosomal recessive manner.

== Pathophysiology ==
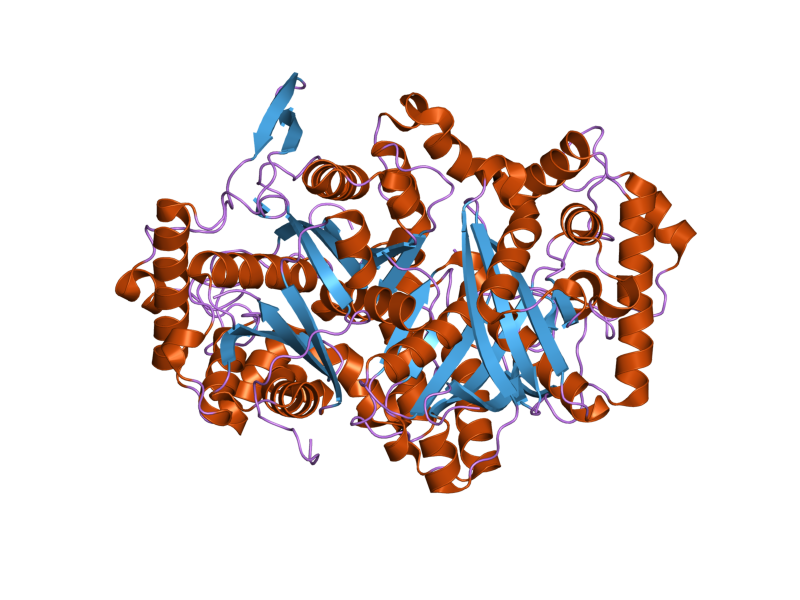
ACAA1

The mechanism of rhizomelic chondrodysplasia punctata in the case of type 1 of this condition involves a defect in PEX7, whose product is involved in peroxisome assembly. There are 3 pathways that depend on peroxisomal biogenesis factor 7 activities, including:

- AGPS (catalyzes plasmalogen biosynthesis)
- PhYH (catalyzes catabolism of phytanic acid)
- ACAA1 (catalyzes beta-oxidation of VLCFA - straight)

== Diagnosis ==
Peroxisome (this condition affects the peroxisome, causing peroxisome biogenesis disorders.)

The diagnosis of rhizomelic chondrodysplasia punctata can be based on genetic testing as well as radiography results, plus a physical examination of the individual.

=== Types ===
- Type 1 (RCDP1) is associated with PEX7 mutations; these are peroxisome biogenesis disorders where proper assembly of peroxisomes is impaired.
- Type 2 (RCDP2) is associated with DHAPAT mutations.
- Type 3 (RCDP3) is associated with AGPS mutations.

== Treatment ==
Management of rhizomelic chondrodysplasia punctata can include physical therapy; additionally orthopedic procedures improved function sometimes in affected people.

== Prognosis ==
The prognosis is poor in this condition, and most children die before the age of 10. However, some survive to adulthood, especially if they have a non-classical (mild) form of RCDP.

Children with classical, or severe, RCDP1 have severe developmental disabilities. Most of them achieve early developmental skills, such as smiling, but they will not develop skills expected from a baby older than six months (such as feeding themselves or walking). By contrast, children with non-classical mild RCDP1 often learn to walk and talk.

== See also ==
- Plasmalogen
- Peroxisomal disorder
