= Peroxisome-assembly ATPase =

Class of enzymes

Identifiers
- EC no.: 3.6.4.7

Databases
- IntEnz: IntEnz view
- BRENDA: BRENDA entry
- ExPASy: NiceZyme view
- KEGG: KEGG entry
- MetaCyc: metabolic pathway
- PRIAM: profile
- PDB structures: RCSB PDB PDBe PDBsum
Search
- PMC: articles
- PubMed: articles
- NCBI: proteins

In enzymology, a peroxisome-assembly ATPase (EC 3.6.4.7) is an enzyme that catalyzes the chemical reaction

ATP + H_{2}O $\rightleftharpoons$ ADP + phosphate

Thus, the two substrates of this enzyme are ATP and H_{2}O, whereas its two products are ADP and phosphate. Its function is to transport components of the peroxisome in and out of the organelle.

This enzyme belongs to the family of hydrolases, specifically those acting on acid anhydrides to facilitate cellular and subcellular movement. The systematic name of this enzyme class is ATP phosphohydrolase (peroxisome-assembling). This enzyme is also called peroxisome assembly factor-2.
