= Pipecolic acidemia =

- Other names: Hyperpipecolic acidemia or Hyperpipecolatemia
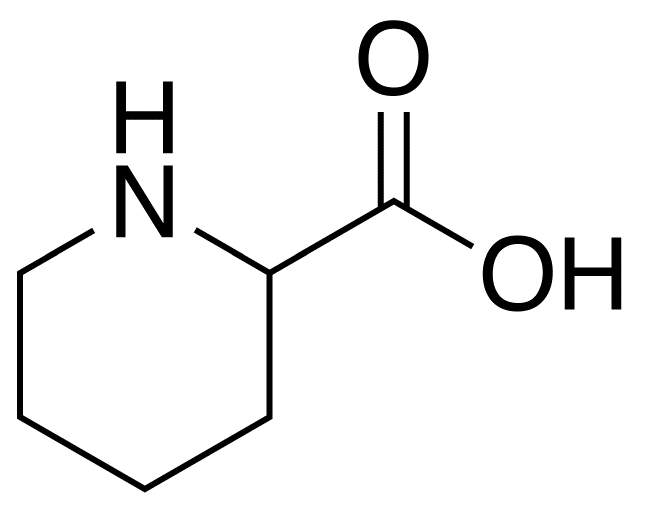
- Pipecolic acid
- Specialty: Medical genetics, endocrinology

Pipecolic acidemia is a very rare autosomal recessive metabolic disorder that is caused by a peroxisomal defect.

Pipecolic acidemia can also be an associated component of Refsum disease with increased pipecolic acidemia (RDPA), as well as other peroxisomal disorders, including both infantile and adult Refsum disease, and Zellweger syndrome.

The disorder is characterized by an increase in pipecolic acid levels in the blood, leading to neuropathy and hepatomegaly.

== See also ==
- AASDHPPT
- PHYH
