= Neonatal cholestasis =

Neonatal cholestasis refers to elevated levels of conjugated bilirubin identified in newborn infants within the first few months of life. Conjugated hyperbilirubinemia is clinically defined as >20% of total serum bilirubin or conjugated bilirubin concentration greater than 1.0 mg/dL regardless of total serum bilirubin concentration. The differential diagnosis for neonatal cholestasis can vary extensively. However, the underlying disease pathology is caused by improper transport and/or defects in excretion of bile from hepatocytes leading to an accumulation of conjugated bilirubin in the body. Generally, symptoms associated with neonatal cholestasis can vary based on the underlying cause of the disease. However, most infants affected will present with jaundice, conjunctival icterus, failure to thrive, acholic or pale stools, and dark urine.

== Epidemiology ==
Neonatal cholestasis can present in newborn infants within the first few months of life. The incidence of neonatal cholestasis is approximately 1 in 2,500 term births. While neonatal cholestasis can present from a number of pathologic causes, 35-40% of neonatal cholestasis cases are caused by biliary atresia. This is one of the most common causes for neonatal cholestasis. Metabolic and genetic disorders cause 9-17% of cases, infectious processes cause 1-9% of cases, Alagille syndrome causes 2-6% of cases, and idiopathic cases arise 13-30% of the time.

== Causes ==
While neonatal cholestasis refers to conjugated hyperbilirubinemia in newborn infants, there are many pathologic processes that can cause this to occur. Any anatomic disturbance or obstruction in the hepatobiliary tract can cause elevated levels of conjugated bilirubin. Some of the causes of neonatal cholestasis are listed below:

=== Anatomic and structural ===
- Biliary atresia
- Choledochal cyst
- Cholelithiasis
- Malignancy

=== Genetic and inborn errors of metabolism ===
- Alpha-1 antitrypsin deficiency
- Alagille syndrome
- Cystic fibrosis
- Galactosemia
- Gaucher disease
- Niemann–Pick disease, type C
- Mitochondrial disorders
- Peroxisomal disorders

=== Biliary ===
- Biliary sludge
- Neonatal sclerosing cholangitis

=== Infectious ===
- TORCH infections
- Viral (e.g. HIV, hepatitis, adenovirus, echovirus)
- Bacterial (e.g. tuberculosis, syphilis)

=== Toxins ===
- Drugs
- Endotoxins

=== Endocrine ===
- Hypothyroidism
- Panhypopituitarism

== Pathophysiology ==
=== Formation of bilirubin ===
Bilirubin is formed from two sources: hemoglobin in red blood cells and heme-containing proteins in other tissues of the body. The breakdown of hemoglobin and heme releases unconjugated bilirubin into the blood stream. This unconjugated bilirubin is transported to the liver by albumin In the liver, unconjugated bilirubin is converted to conjugated bilirubin, making it more water-soluble.

=== Transport of bile ===
Conjugated bilirubin is released from the liver as bile and drains into the common hepatic duct. The common hepatic duct will combine with the cystic duct from the gallbladder to form the common bile duct. The common bile duct will drain into the duodenum of the small intestine to release the bile, which helps breakdown fat from meals.

=== Mechanism ===
Any disturbance within the hepatobiliary system, excretion of bilirubin from the liver, or the transport of bilirubin to the small intestine can cause neonatal cholestasis and elevated levels of conjugated bilirubin.

== Clinical presentation ==
Physiologic jaundice can be a benign condition that presents in newborns until two weeks of life. However, jaundice that continues after two weeks requires follow up with measurement of total and conjugated bilirubin. Elevated levels of conjugated bilirubin are never benign and require further evaluation for neonatal cholestasis. Most infants affected by neonatal cholestasis will present with jaundice, conjunctival icterus, failure to thrive after two weeks, acholic/pale stools, and dark urine. Additional symptoms may vary based on the cause of neonatal cholestasis. For example, if a patient's symptoms are caused by a choledochal cyst, they may present with abdominal pain, vomiting, and a palpable abdominal mass. Patients with alpha-1 antitrypsin deficiency may present with hepatomegaly and elevated liver enzymes.

== Evaluation and diagnosis ==
If neonatal cholestasis is suspected or an infant is presenting with jaundice after two weeks of life, total and conjugated bilirubin must be measured. Neonatal cholestasis is present if conjugated bilirubin value is >20% of total serum bilirubin or if serum conjugated bilirubin concentration is greater than 1.0 mg/dL.

If conjugated hyperbilirubinemia is present, an abdominal ultrasound is often obtained for further evaluation of the hepatobiliary tract. Imaging can provide structural information to indicate if neonatal cholestasis is caused by an anatomic variant.

Additional laboratory studies are ordered to further evaluate the cause of neonatal cholestasis. Complete blood count (CBC), comprehensive metabolic panel (CMP) including liver enzymes, serum protein and albumin, and coagulation studies can be useful in determining if the symptoms are associated with the liver, red blood cells and hemoglobin, or gallbladder. If imaging and lab results are not sufficient in determining a cause for neonatal cholestasis, genetic testing is available to determine if the cause is a genetic disease.

Liver biopsy performed through the skin can be completed if initial evaluation does not indicate neonatal cholestasis but is clinically suspected. Histopathology would show dilation and proliferation of bile ducts, with the presence of inflammation and plugging of the bile ducts.

== Treatment and prognosis ==
Treatment and prognosis for neonatal cholestasis depends on the specific cause. Some infants will fully recover with lifestyle modifications and surgical intervention, while others may progress to chronic liver disease and liver failure. For patients that present with neonatal cholestasis from galactosemia, patients are advised to avoid galactose in their diet for life. This modification can be sufficient in treating neonatal complications.

Biliary atresia requires urgent surgical intervention with intraoperative cholangiography. A hepatoportoenterostomy (HPE) procedure is performed to restore the flow of bile from the liver to small intestine.

Neonatal cholestasis caused by alpha-1 antitrypsin deficiency does not have any specific treatment. Instead, children with alpha-1 antitrypsin deficiency are primarily managed by treating symptoms clinically. Most children will also require a liver transplant in the future because they will progress to having cirrhosis, hepatocellular carcinoma, and/or chronic liver disease.

Generally, treatment of neonatal cholestasis involves treating the underlying disease. Prognosis of neonatal cholestasis also varies based on the underlying pathologic process.

== See also ==
- Neonatal jaundice
