= PEX6 =

Protein-coding gene in the species Homo sapiens

Identifiers
- Aliases: PEX6, PAF-2, PAF2, PBD4A, PDB4B, PXAAA1, HMLR2, peroxisomal biogenesis factor 6
- External IDs: OMIM: 601498; MGI: 2385054; GeneCards: PEX6

Gene location (Human)
| Chr. | Chromosome 6 (human) |
| Band | 6p21.1 | Start | 42,963,865 bp |
| Band | 6p21.1 | End | 42,979,181 bp |

Gene location (Mouse)
| Chr. | Chromosome 17 (mouse) |
| Band | 17|17 C | Start | 47,022,389 bp |
| Band | 17|17 C | End | 47,036,467 bp |
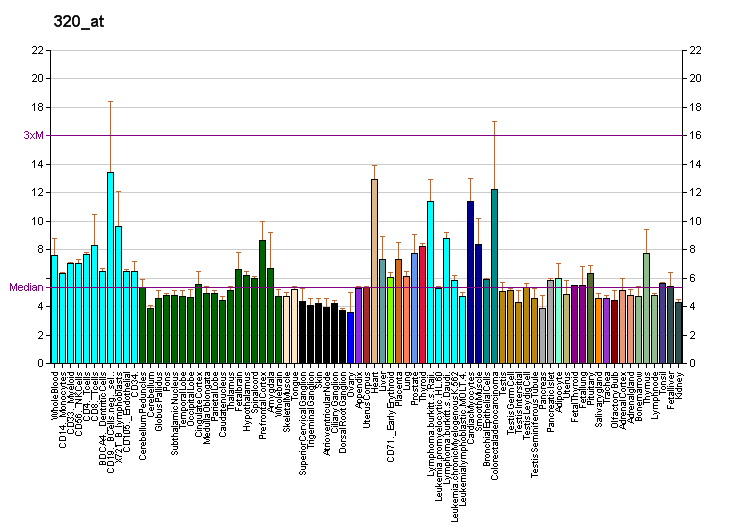

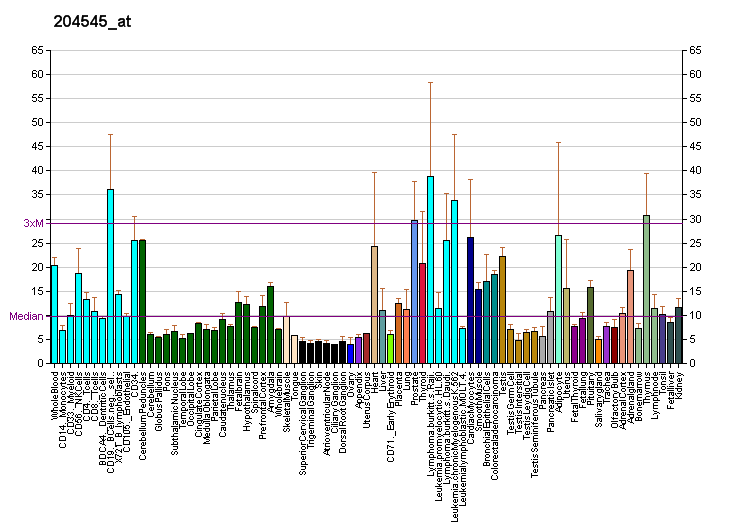
RNA expression pattern
| Bgee | Human / Mouse (ortholog); Top expressed in: right uterine tube; body of pancreas; mucosa of transverse colon; right hemisphere of cerebellum; right lobe of liver; anterior pituitary; right ovary; left ovary; right frontal lobe; right adrenal gland / Top expressed in: Rostral migratory stream; internal carotid artery; left lobe of liver; external carotid artery; brown adipose tissue; ciliary body; transitional epithelium of urinary bladder; motor neuron; Paneth cell; vas deferens; More reference expression data |
| BioGPS | More reference expression data |
Gene ontology
| Molecular function | nucleotide binding; protein C-terminus binding; ATPase activity; protein binding; ATP binding; protein-containing complex binding |
| Cellular component | cytoplasm; peroxisomal membrane; peroxisome; membrane; photoreceptor cell cilium; photoreceptor outer segment; cell projection; cytosol |
| Biological process | protein stabilization; peroxisome organization; protein import into peroxisome matrix, translocation; protein targeting to peroxisome; protein import into peroxisome matrix |
Sources:Amigo / QuickGO
Orthologs
| Databases | NCBI: entry; OMA: entry |
| Species | Human | Mouse |
| Entrez | 5190 | 224824 |
| Ensembl | ENSG00000124587 | ENSMUSG00000002763 |
| UniProt | Q13608 | Q99LC9 |
| RefSeq (mRNA) | NM_000287; NM_001316313 | NM_145488 |
| RefSeq (protein) | NP_000278; NP_001303242 | NP_663463 |
| Location (UCSC) | Chr 6: 42.96 – 42.98 Mb | Chr 17: 47.02 – 47.04 Mb |
| PubMed search |
- Wikidata
| View/Edit Human | View/Edit Mouse |

Peroxisome assembly factor 2 is a protein that in humans is encoded by the PEX6 gene. PEX6 is an AAA ATPase that localizes to the peroxisome. PEX6 forms a hexamer with PEX1 and is recruited to the membrane by PEX26.

== Function ==
From yeast to plants to humans, there is only one verified function of PEX6; PEX6 (and PEX1) removes PEX5 from the peroxisomal membrane so that PEX5 may do additional rounds of peroxisomal import. Human PEX6 can genetically complement plant pex6 mutants, which highlights functional conservation. Work with pex6 mutants in Arabidopsis thaliana has shown that PEX6 may have a role in consuming oil body (plant-specific lipid droplets). Work with yeast pex6 mutants has shown that PEX6 is a key player in the autophagy of peroxisomes called pexophagy.

== Related diseases ==
Mutations in the genes encoding PEX6, along with PEX1, are the leading causes of peroxisomal biogenesis disorders, such as Zellweger Syndrome spectrum, infantile Refsum disease, and neonatal adrenoleukodystrophy. These genetic diseases are autosomal recessive and occur in 1 of every 50,000 births. Because of the autosomal recessive inheritance of Zellweger Syndrome, PEX6 can usually be found in larger carrier screening gene panels.
