= PEX1 =

Protein-coding gene in the species Homo sapiens

Identifiers
- Aliases: PEX1, PBD1A, PBD1B, ZWS, ZWS1, HMLR1, peroxisomal biogenesis factor 1
- External IDs: OMIM: 602136; MGI: 1918632; GeneCards: PEX1
Available structures
| PDB | Ortholog search: PDBe RCSB |
| PDB | List of PDB id codes 1WLF |

Gene location (Human)
| Chr. | Chromosome 7 (human) |
| Band | 7q21.2 | Start | 92,487,020 bp |
| Band | 7q21.2 | End | 92,528,520 bp |

Gene location (Mouse)
| Chr. | Chromosome 5 (mouse) |
| Band | 5|5 A1 | Start | 3,646,066 bp |
| Band | 5|5 A1 | End | 3,687,232 bp |
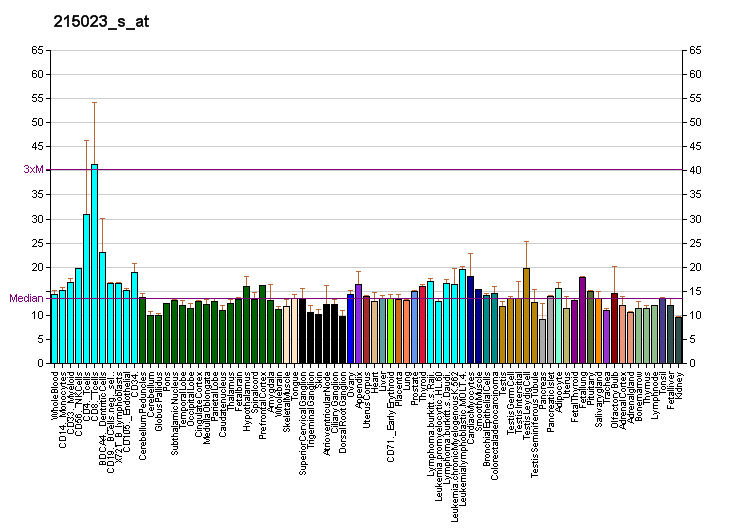

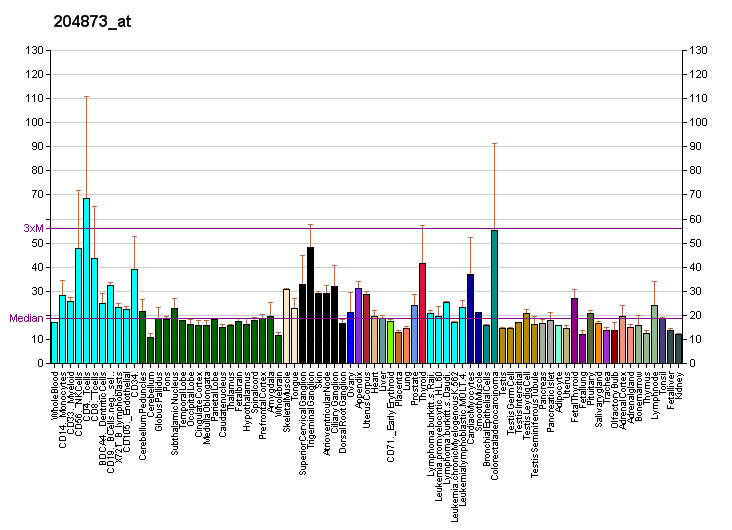
RNA expression pattern
| Bgee | Human / Mouse (ortholog); Top expressed in: Achilles tendon; body of pancreas; gastric mucosa; skin of leg; right hemisphere of cerebellum; skin of abdomen; rectum; C1 segment; left lobe of thyroid gland; tibial nerve / Top expressed in: zygote; secondary oocyte; neural layer of retina; hand; left lobe of liver; primary oocyte; tail of embryo; epithelium of small intestine; superior frontal gyrus; yolk sac; More reference expression data |
| BioGPS | More reference expression data |
Gene ontology
| Molecular function | protein-containing complex binding; nucleotide binding; protein C-terminus binding; protein binding; ATP binding; ATPase activity |
| Cellular component | cytoplasm; cytosol; peroxisomal membrane; peroxisome; extracellular exosome; membrane |
| Biological process | protein targeting to peroxisome; protein transport; microtubule-based peroxisome localization; peroxisome organization; protein import into peroxisome matrix; transport |
Sources:Amigo / QuickGO
Orthologs
| Databases | NCBI: entry; OMA: entry |
| Species | Human | Mouse |
| Entrez | 5189 | 71382 |
| Ensembl | ENSG00000127980 | ENSMUSG00000005907 |
| UniProt | O43933 | Q5BL07 |
| RefSeq (mRNA) | NM_000466; NM_001282677; NM_001282678 | NM_001293806; NM_027777; NM_177211 |
| RefSeq (protein) | NP_000457; NP_001269606; NP_001269607 | NP_001280735; NP_082053 |
| Location (UCSC) | Chr 7: 92.49 – 92.53 Mb | Chr 5: 3.65 – 3.69 Mb |
| PubMed search |
- Wikidata
| View/Edit Human | View/Edit Mouse |

Peroxisome biogenesis factor 1, also known as PEX1, is a protein which in humans is encoded by the PEX1 gene.

This gene encodes a member of the AAA protein family, a large group of ATPases associated with diverse cellular activities. This protein is cytoplasmic but is often anchored to a peroxisomal membrane where it forms a heteromeric complex and plays a role in the import of proteins into peroxisomes and peroxisome biogenesis. Mutations in this gene have been associated with complementation group 1 peroxisomal disorders such as neonatal adrenoleukodystrophy, infantile Refsum disease, and Zellweger syndrome.

== Interactions ==
PEX1 has been shown to interact with PEX6 and PEX26.

== Related diseases ==
Mutations in the genes encoding PEX1, along with PEX6, are the leading causes of peroxisomal biogenesis disorders, such as Zellweger Syndrome spectrum, infantile Refsum disease, and neonatal adrenoleukodystrophy. These genetic diseases are autosomal recessive and occur in 1 of every 50,000 births. Because of the autosomal recessive inheritance of Zellweger Syndrome, PEX1 is usually found in carrier screening gene panels. A very common PEX1 variant, Gly843Asp, is a mild allele well-reported in the literature.
