= Hans Zellweger =

American physician

Hans Ulrich Zellweger
- Born: 19 June 1909; Lugano, Switzerland
- Died: 24 February 1990 (aged 80); Iowa City, Iowa
- Known for: Zellweger syndrome
- Scientific career
- Fields: Pediatrics
- Workplaces: University of Iowa

Hans Ulrich Zellweger (19 June 1909, in Lugano – 24 February 1990, in Iowa City, Iowa) was a Swiss-American pediatrician known for his research on Zellweger syndrome.

Zellweger trained in Zurich, Hamburg, Rome and Berlin and received his doctorate in Zurich in 1934, where he worked until 1950. In the 1950s he was appointed Professor at the American University in Beirut and from 1959 until his retirement in 1977, he was Professor of Paediatrics at the University of Iowa. There he performed research on neuromuscular disorders and genetic diseases and is known for his research on Zellweger syndrome which is named after him.

== Literature ==
- H. R. Wiedemann: Hans-Ulrich Zellweger (1909-1990). In: European Journal of Pediatrics. Band 150, Nummer 7, Mai 1991, S. 451, ISSN 0340-6199. PMID 1915492.
