= Peroxisomal biogenesis factor 2 =

Protein found in humans

PEX2

Identifiers
- Aliases: PEX2, PAF1, PBD5A, PBD5B, PMP3, PMP35, PXMP3, RNF72, ZWS3, peroxisomal biogenesis factor 2
- External IDs: OMIM: 170993; MGI: 107486; GeneCards: PEX2
Enzyme activity
EC #	BRENDA	ExPASy	KEGG	MetaCyc
2.3.2.27	↗	↗	↗	↗
2.3.2.36	↗	↗	↗	↗

Gene location (Human)
Chr.	Chromosome 8 (human)
Band	8q21.13	Start	76,980,258 bp
Band	8q21.13	End	77,001,044 bp

Gene location (Mouse)
Chr.	Chromosome 3 (mouse)
Band	3 A1|3 1.96 cM	Start	5,625,248 bp
Band	3 A1|3 1.96 cM	End	5,641,299 bp
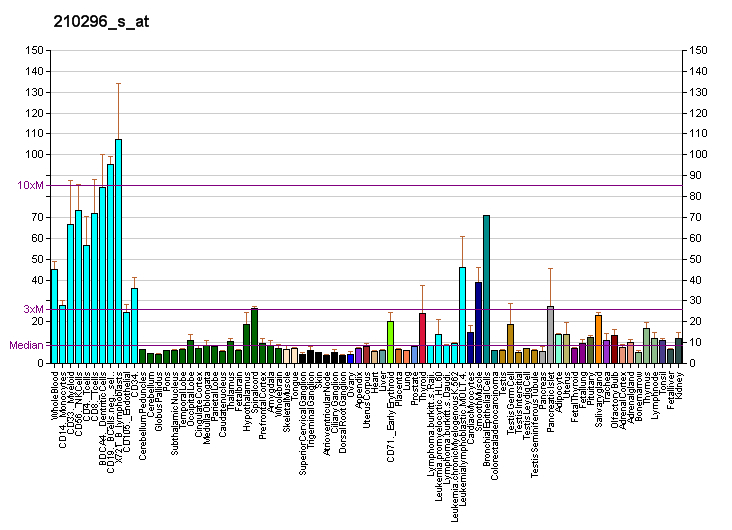
RNA expression pattern
Bgee	Human / Mouse (ortholog); Top expressed in: seminal vesicula; ventricular zone; olfactory zone of nasal mucosa; islet of Langerhans; rectum; monocyte; epithelium of colon; right adrenal cortex; gallbladder; body of pancreas / Top expressed in: proximal tubule; right kidney; medullary collecting duct; seminal vesicula; intercostal muscle; epithelium of lens; medial ganglionic eminence; vestibular sensory epithelium; atrioventricular valve; parotid gland; More reference expression data
BioGPS	More reference expression data
Gene ontology
Molecular function	protein binding; metal ion binding; ubiquitin protein ligase activity
Cellular component	Cdc73/Paf1 complex; peroxisome; integral component of peroxisomal membrane; integral component of membrane; membrane; peroxisomal membrane
Biological process	negative regulation of fibroblast proliferation; protein import into peroxisome matrix; fatty acid beta-oxidation; protein destabilization; very long-chain fatty acid metabolic process; negative regulation of transcription by RNA polymerase II; peroxisome organization; negative regulation of epithelial cell proliferation; protein ubiquitination; protein targeting to peroxisome
Sources:Amigo / QuickGO
Orthologs
Databases	NCBI: entry; OMA: entry
Species	Human	Mouse
Entrez	5828	19302
Ensembl	ENSG00000164751	ENSMUSG00000040374
UniProt	P28328	P55098
RefSeq (mRNA)	NM_001172087; NM_000318; NM_001079867; NM_001172086	NM_001163301; NM_001163302; NM_001163304; NM_001163305; NM_001163306 NM_001267714; NM_001267715; NM_008994
RefSeq (protein)	NP_000309; NP_001073336; NP_001165557; NP_001165558	NP_001156773; NP_001156774; NP_001156777; NP_001156778; NP_001254643 NP_001254644; NP_033020
Location (UCSC)	Chr 8: 76.98 – 77 Mb	Chr 3: 5.63 – 5.64 Mb
PubMed search
- Wikidata
View/Edit Human	View/Edit Mouse

Peroxisomal biogenesis factor 2 is a protein that in humans is encoded by the PEX2 gene.

This gene encodes an integral peroxisomal membrane protein required for peroxisome biogenesis. The protein is thought to be involved in peroxisomal matrix protein import. Mutations in this gene result in one form of Zellweger syndrome and infantile Refsum disease. Alternative splicing results in multiple transcript variants encoding the same protein.
