= Peroxisome =

Type of organelle

Basic structure of a peroxisome

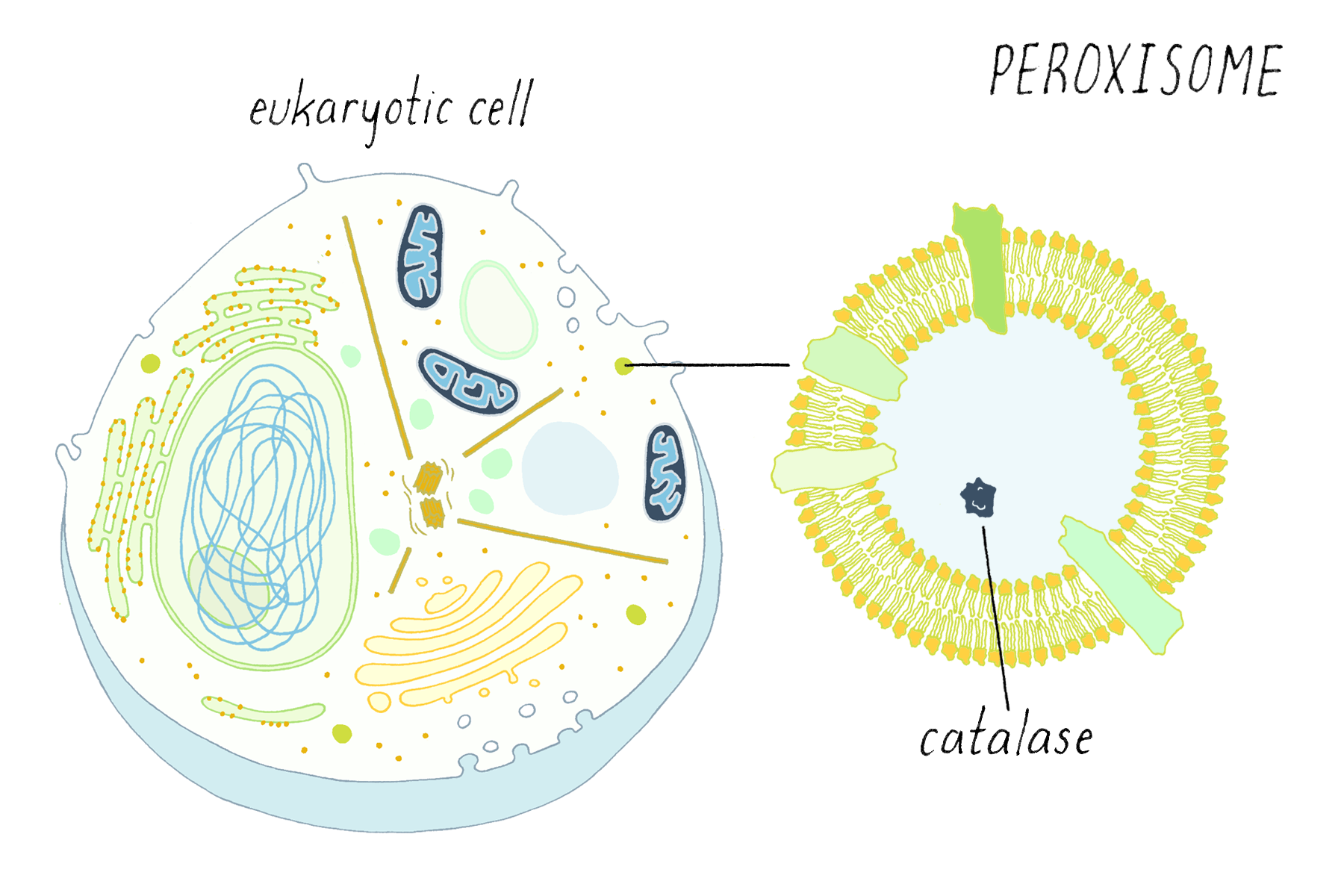
A peroxisome is a membrane bound organelle in eukaryotic cells that contains critical enzymes involved in the conversion of long chain fatty acids and branched fatty acids into simpler substrates for use by mitochondria in energy production.

Distribution of peroxisomes (white) in HEK 293 cells during mitosis

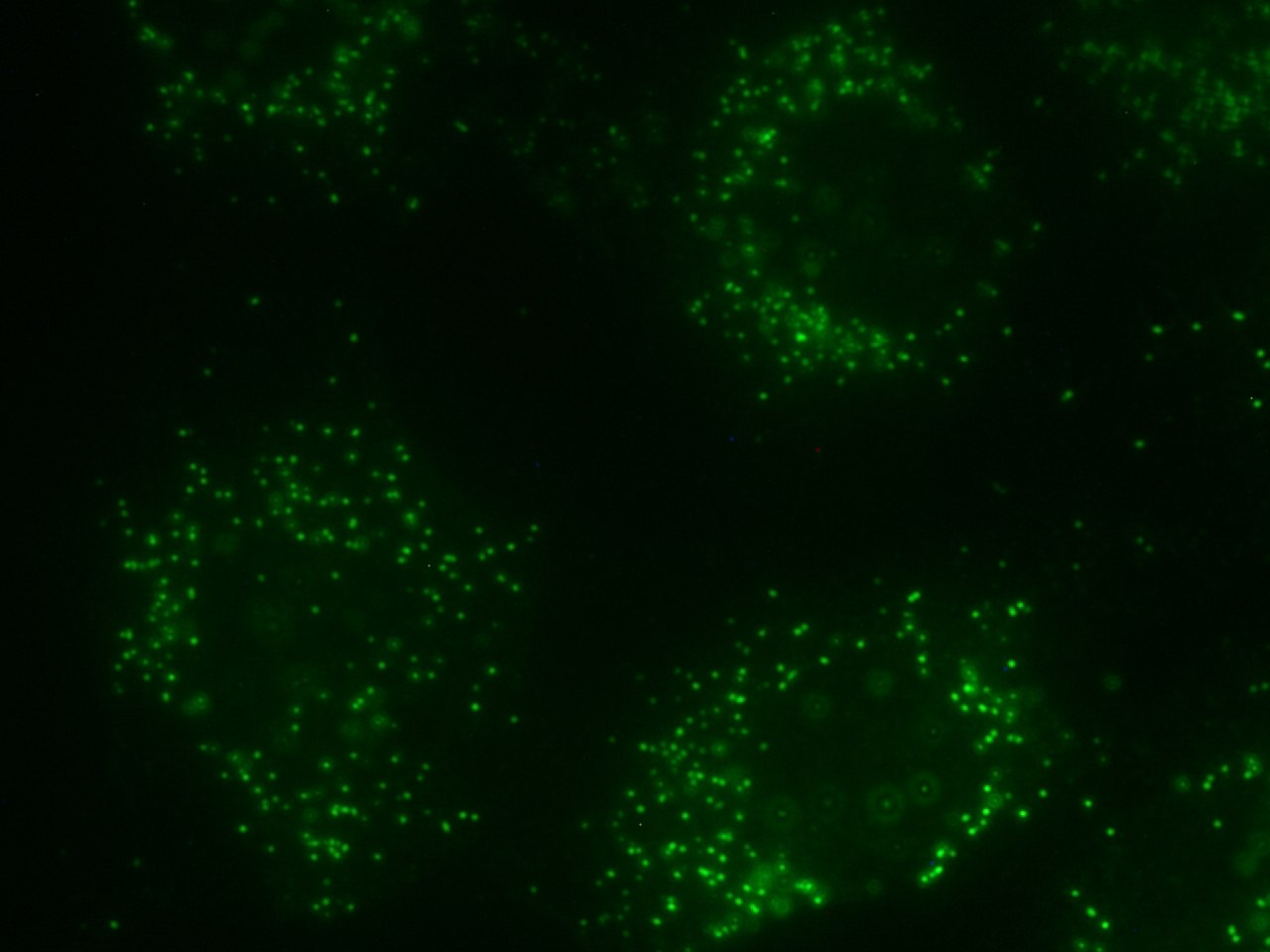
Peroxisome in rat neonatal cardiomyocyte

A peroxisome (/pəˈrɒksɪˌsoʊm/) is a membrane-bound organelle, a type of microbody, found in the cytoplasm of virtually all eukaryotic cells. Peroxisomes are oxidative organelles. Frequently, molecular oxygen serves as a co-substrate, from which hydrogen peroxide (H_{2}O_{2}) is then formed. Peroxisomes owe their name to hydrogen peroxide-generating and scavenging activities. They perform key roles in lipid metabolism and the reduction of reactive oxygen species.

Peroxisomes are involved in the catabolism of very long chain fatty acids, branched chain fatty acids, bile acid intermediates (in the liver), D-amino acids, and polyamines. Peroxisomes also play a role in the biosynthesis of plasmalogens: ether phospholipids critical for the normal function of mammalian brains and lungs. Peroxisomes contain approximately 10% of the total activity of two enzymes (Glucose-6-phosphate dehydrogenase and 6-Phosphogluconate dehydrogenase) in the pentose phosphate pathway, which is important for energy metabolism. It is debated whether peroxisomes are involved in isoprenoid and cholesterol synthesis in animals. Other peroxisomal functions include the glyoxylate cycle in germinating seeds ("glyoxysomes"), photorespiration in leaves, glycolysis in trypanosomes ("glycosomes"), and methanol and amine oxidation and assimilation in some yeasts.

== History ==
Peroxisomes (microbodies) were first described by a Swedish doctoral student, J. Rhodin in 1954. They were identified as organelles by Christian de Duve and Pierre Baudhuin in 1966. De Duve and co-workers discovered that peroxisomes contain several oxidases involved in the production of hydrogen peroxide (H_{2}O_{2}) as well as catalase involved in the decomposition of H_{2}O_{2} to oxygen and water. Due to their role in peroxide metabolism, De Duve named them "peroxisomes", replacing the formerly used morphological term "microbodies". Later, it was described that firefly luciferase is targeted to peroxisomes in mammalian cells, allowing the discovery of the import targeting signal for peroxisomes, and triggering many advances in the peroxisome biogenesis field.

== Structure ==
Peroxisomes are small (0.1–1 μm diameter) organelles with a fine, granular matrix, surrounded by a single biomembrane located in the cytoplasm of a cell. Compartmentalization creates an optimized environment to promote various metabolic reactions within peroxisomes required to sustain cellular functions and viability of the organism.

The number, size, and protein composition of peroxisomes are variable and depend on cell type and environmental conditions. For example, in baker's yeast (S. cerevisiae), it has been observed that, with a good glucose supply, only a few, small peroxisomes are present. In contrast, when the yeasts were supplied with long-chain fatty acids as sole carbon source up to 20 to 25 large peroxisomes can be formed.

== Metabolic functions ==
A major function of the peroxisome is the breakdown of very long chain fatty acids through beta oxidation. In animal cells, the long fatty acids are converted to medium chain fatty acids, which are subsequently shuttled to mitochondria where they eventually are broken down to carbon dioxide and water. In yeast and plant cells, this process is carried out exclusively in peroxisomes.

The first reactions in the formation of plasmalogen in animal cells also occur in peroxisomes. Plasmalogen is the most abundant phospholipid in myelin. Deficiency of plasmalogens causes profound abnormalities in the myelination of nerve cells, which is one reason why many peroxisomal disorders affect the nervous system. Peroxisomes also play a role in the production of bile acids important for the absorption of fats and fat-soluble vitamins, such as vitamins A and K. Skin disorders are features of genetic disorders affecting peroxisome function as a result.

The specific metabolic pathways that occur exclusively in mammalian peroxisomes are:

- α-oxidation of phytanic acid
- β-oxidation of very-long-chain and polyunsaturated fatty acids
- biosynthesis of plasmalogens
- conjugation of cholic acid as part of bile acid synthesis

Peroxisomes contain oxidative enzymes, such as D-amino acid oxidase and uric acid oxidase. However the last enzyme is absent in humans, explaining the disease known as gout, caused by the accumulation of uric acid. Certain enzymes within the peroxisome, by using molecular oxygen, remove hydrogen atoms from specific organic substrates (labeled as R), in an oxidative reaction, producing hydrogen peroxide (H_{2}O_{2}, itself toxic):

$$\mathrm{RH}_\mathrm{2} + \mathrm{O}_\mathrm{2} \rightarrow \mathrm{R }+ \mathrm{H}_2\mathrm{O}_2$$

Catalase, another peroxisomal enzyme, uses this H_{2}O_{2} to oxidize other substrates, including phenols, formic acid, formaldehyde, and alcohol, by means of the peroxidation reaction:

$\mathrm{H}_2\mathrm{O}_2 + \mathrm{R'H}_2 \rightarrow \mathrm{R'} + 2\mathrm{H}_2\mathrm{O}$, thus eliminating the poisonous hydrogen peroxide in the process.

This reaction is important in liver and kidney cells, where the peroxisomes detoxify various toxic substances that enter the blood. About 25% of the ethanol that humans consume by drinking alcoholic beverages is oxidized to acetaldehyde in this way. In addition, when excess H_{2}O_{2} accumulates in the cell, catalase converts it to H_{2}O through this reaction:

$$2\mathrm{H}_2\mathrm{O}_2 \rightarrow 2\mathrm{H}_2\mathrm{O} + \mathrm{O}_2$$

In higher plants, peroxisomes contain also a complex battery of antioxidative enzymes such as superoxide dismutase, the components of the ascorbate-glutathione cycle, and the NADP-dehydrogenases of the pentose-phosphate pathway. It has been demonstrated that peroxisomes generate superoxide (O_{2}^{•−}) and nitric oxide (^{•}NO) radicals.

There is evidence now that those reactive oxygen species including peroxisomal H_{2}O_{2} are also important signaling molecules in plants and animals and contribute to healthy aging and age-related disorders in humans.

The peroxisome of plant cells is polarised when fighting fungal penetration. Infection causes a glucosinolate molecule to play an antifungal role to be made and delivered to the outside of the cell through the action of the peroxisomal proteins (PEN2 and PEN3).

Peroxisomes in mammals and humans also contribute to anti-viral defense, and to the combat of pathogens.

== Peroxisome assembly ==
Peroxisomes are derived from the smooth endoplasmic reticulum under certain experimental conditions and replicate by membrane growth and division out of pre-existing organelles. Peroxisome matrix proteins are translated in the cytoplasm prior to import. Specific amino acid sequences (PTS or peroxisomal targeting signal) at the C-terminus (PTS1) or N-terminus (PTS2) of peroxisomal matrix proteins signal them to be imported into the organelle by a targeting factor. There are currently 36 known proteins involved in peroxisome biogenesis and maintenance, called peroxins, which participate in the process of peroxisome assembly in different organisms. In mammalian cells, there are 13 characterized peroxins. In contrast to protein import into the endoplasmic reticulum (ER) or mitochondria, proteins do not need to be unfolded to be imported into the peroxisome lumen. The matrix protein import receptors, the peroxins PEX5 and PEX7, accompany their cargoes (containing a PTS1 or a PTS2 amino acid sequence, respectively) all the way to the peroxisome where they release the cargo into the peroxisomal matrix and then return to the cytosol – a step named recycling. A special way of peroxisomal protein targeting is called piggybacking. Proteins transported by this unique method do not have a canonical PTS but bind on a PTS protein to be transported as a complex. A model describing the import cycle is referred to as the extended shuttle mechanism. There is now evidence that ATP hydrolysis is required for the recycling of receptors to the cytosol. Also, ubiquitination is crucial for the export of PEX5 from the peroxisome to the cytosol. The biogenesis of the peroxisomal membrane and the insertion of peroxisomal membrane proteins (PMPs) requires the peroxins PEX19, PEX3, and PEX16. PEX19 is a PMP receptor and chaperone, which binds the PMPs and routes them to the peroxisomal membrane, where it interacts with PEX3, a peroxisomal integral membrane protein. PMPs are then inserted into the peroxisomal membrane.

The degradation of peroxisomes is called pexophagy.

== Peroxisome interaction and communication ==
The diverse functions of peroxisomes require dynamic interactions and cooperation with many organelles involved in cellular lipid metabolisms such as the endoplasmic reticulum, mitochondria, lipid droplets, and lysosomes.

Peroxisomes interact with mitochondria in several metabolic pathways, including β-oxidation of fatty acids and the metabolism of reactive oxygen species. Both organelles are in close contact with the endoplasmic reticulum and share several proteins, including organelle fission factors. Peroxisomes also interact with the endoplasmic reticulum and cooperate in the synthesis of ether lipids (plasmalogens), which are important for nerve cells (see above). In filamentous fungi, peroxisomes move on microtubules by 'hitchhiking,' a process involving contact with rapidly moving early endosomes. Physical contact between organelles is often mediated by membrane contact sites, where membranes of two organelles are physically tethered to enable rapid transfer of small molecules, enable organelle communication and are crucial for coordination of cellular functions and hence human health. Alterations of membrane contacts have been observed in various diseases.

== Associated medical conditions ==
Peroxisomal disorders are a class of medical conditions that typically affect the human nervous system as well as many other organ systems. Two common examples are X-linked adrenoleukodystrophy and the peroxisome biogenesis disorders.

== Genes ==
PEX genes encode the protein machinery (peroxins) required for proper peroxisome assembly. Peroxisomal membrane proteins are imported through at least two routes, one of which depends on the interaction between peroxin 19 and peroxin 3, while the other is required for the import of peroxin 3, either of which may occur without the import of matrix (lumen) enzymes, which possess the peroxisomal targeting signal PTS1 or PTS2 as previously discussed. Elongation of the peroxisome membrane and the final fission of the organelle are regulated by Pex11p.

Genes that encode peroxin proteins include: PEX1, PEX2 (PXMP3), PEX3, PEX5, PEX6, PEX7, PEX9, PEX10, PEX11A, PEX11B, PEX11G, PEX12, PEX13, PEX14, PEX16, PEX19, PEX26, PEX28, PEX30, and PEX31. Between organisms, PEX numbering and function can differ.

== Evolutionary origins ==
Two independent evolutionary analyses of the peroxisomal proteome found homologies between the peroxisomal import machinery and the ERAD pathway in the endoplasmic reticulum, along with a number of metabolic enzymes that were likely recruited from the mitochondria. This theory is in line with the experimental derivation of peroxisome from the ER described above.

The protein content of peroxisomes varies across species or organism, but the presence of proteins common to many species has been used to suggest an endosymbiotic origin; that is, peroxisomes evolved from bacteria that invaded larger cells as parasites, and very gradually evolved a symbiotic relationship. (A specific theory posits the possibility of an Actinomycetota origin; but there was no phylogenetic support.) However, this view has been challenged by recent discoveries. For example, peroxisome-less mutants can restore peroxisomes upon introduction of the wild-type gene.

== Other related organelles ==
Other organelles of the microbody family related to peroxisomes include glyoxysomes of plants and filamentous fungi, glycosomes of kinetoplastids, and Woronin bodies of filamentous fungi.

== See also ==
- Peroxisome proliferator-activated receptor
