= Infantile Refsum disease =

- Other names: Infantile phytanic acid storage disease'
- Phytanic acid

Infantile Refsum disease (IRD) is a rare autosomal recessive congenital peroxisomal biogenesis disorder within the Zellweger spectrum. These are disorders of the peroxisomes that are clinically similar to Zellweger syndrome and associated with mutations in the PEX family of genes. IRD is associated with deficient phytanic acid catabolism, as is adult Refsum disease, but they are different disorders that should not be confused.

== Presentation ==
Infantile Refsum disease is one of three peroxisome biogenesis disorders that belong to the Zellweger spectrum of peroxisome biogenesis disorders (PBD-ZSD). The other two disorders are Zellweger syndrome (ZS) and neonatal adrenoleukodystrophy (NALD). Although they share a similar molecular basis for disease, Infantile Refsum disease is less severe than Zellweger syndrome.

Infantile Refsum disease is a developmental brain disorder. In addition, patients can show a reduction in central nervous system (CNS) myelin (particularly cerebral), which is referred to as (hypomyelination). Myelin is critical for normal CNS functions. Patients can also show postdevelopmental sensorineural degeneration that leads to a progressive loss of hearing and vision.

Infantile Refsum disease can also affect the function of many other organ systems. Patients can show craniofacial abnormalities, hepatomegaly (enlarged liver), and progressive adrenal dysfunction. Newborns may present with profound hypotonia (low muscle tone), and a poor ability to feed. In some patients, a progressive leukodystrophy has been observed that has a variable age of onset.

== Molecular mechanism ==
Infantile Refsum disease is an autosomal recessive disorder caused by mutations in genes that encode peroxins, proteins required for normal peroxisome assembly. Most commonly, patients have mutations in the PEX1, PEX3, PEX6, PEX12, and PEX26 genes. In almost all cases, patients have mutations that inactivate or greatly reduce the activity of both the maternal and paternal copies of one of these aforementioned PEX genes.

As a result of impaired peroxisome function, an individual's tissues and cells can accumulate very long-chain fatty acids (VLCFA) and branched-chain fatty acids (BCFA) that are normally degraded in peroxisomes. The accumulation of these lipids can impair the normal function of multiple organ systems, as discussed below. In addition, these individuals can show deficient levels of plasmalogens, ether-phospholipids that are especially important for brain, lung, and heart functions.

== Diagnosis ==
In addition to genetic tests involving PEX genes, biochemical tests have proven highly effective for the diagnosis of infantile Refsum disease and other peroxisomal disorders. Typically, IRD patients show elevated very long chain fatty acids in their blood plasma. Cultured primarily skin fibroblasts obtained from patients show elevated very long chain fatty acids, impaired very long chain fatty acid beta-oxidation, phytanic acid alpha-oxidation, pristanic acid alpha-oxidation, and plasmalogen biosynthesis.

== Management ==
Currently, there is no cure for infantile Refsum disease syndrome, nor is there a standard course of treatment. Infections should be guarded against to prevent such complications as pneumonia and respiratory distress. Other treatment is symptomatic and supportive.

== Prognosis ==
Patients show variable lifespans with some individuals surviving until adulthood and into old age.
