= PEX12 =

Protein-coding gene in humans

Identifiers
- Aliases: PEX12, PAF-3, PBD3A, peroxisomal biogenesis factor 12
- External IDs: OMIM: 601758; MGI: 2144177; GeneCards: PEX12

Gene location (Human)
Chr.	Chromosome 17 (human)
Band	17q12	Start	35,574,795 bp
Band	17q12	End	35,578,863 bp

Gene location (Mouse)
Chr.	Chromosome 11 (mouse)
Band	11|11 C	Start	83,185,468 bp
Band	11|11 C	End	83,193,412 bp
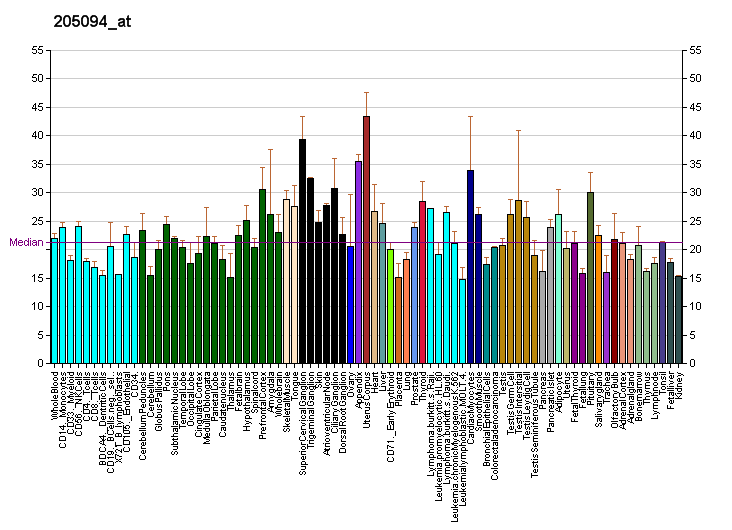
RNA expression pattern
Bgee	Human / Mouse (ortholog); Top expressed in: secondary oocyte; Epithelium of choroid plexus; gonad; germinal epithelium; islet of Langerhans; tibialis anterior muscle; biceps brachii; ventricular zone; deltoid muscle; corpus epididymis / Top expressed in: secondary oocyte; primary oocyte; spermatid; muscle of thigh; zygote; otic vesicle; seminal vesicula; medial ganglionic eminence; proximal tubule; lacrimal gland; More reference expression data
BioGPS	More reference expression data
Gene ontology
Molecular function	ubiquitin-protein transferase activity; zinc ion binding; protein C-terminus binding; protein binding; metal ion binding
Cellular component	integral component of membrane; peroxisomal importomer complex; peroxisome; membrane; integral component of peroxisomal membrane; peroxisomal membrane
Biological process	protein targeting to peroxisome; peroxisome organization; protein import into peroxisome matrix; protein monoubiquitination; protein ubiquitination
Sources:Amigo / QuickGO
Orthologs
Databases	NCBI: entry; OMA: entry
Species	Human	Mouse
Entrez	5193	103737
Ensembl	ENSG00000108733	ENSMUSG00000018733
UniProt	O00623	Q8VC48
RefSeq (mRNA)	NM_000286	NM_134025; NM_001364762; NM_001364763
RefSeq (protein)	NP_000277	NP_598786; NP_001351691; NP_001351692
Location (UCSC)	Chr 17: 35.57 – 35.58 Mb	Chr 11: 83.19 – 83.19 Mb
PubMed search
- Wikidata
View/Edit Human	View/Edit Mouse

Peroxisome assembly protein 12 is a protein that in humans is encoded by the PEX12 gene.

== Function ==
PEX12 is needed for protein import into peroxisomes. This gene belongs to the peroxin-12 family. Peroxins (PEXs) are proteins that are essential for the assembly of functional peroxisomes.

== Clinical significance ==
The peroxisome biogenesis disorders (PBDs; MIM 601539) are a group of genetically heterogeneous diseases that are usually lethal in early infancy. Although the clinical features of PBD patients vary, cells from all PBD patients exhibit a defect in the import of one or more classes of peroxisomal matrix proteins into the organelle. This cellular phenotype is shared by yeast 'pex' mutants, and human orthologs of yeast PEX genes defective in some PBD complementation groups (CGs).

== Interactions ==
PEX12 has been shown to interact with PEX10, PEX5 and PEX19.
