= Plasmalogen =

Subclass of glycerophospholipids

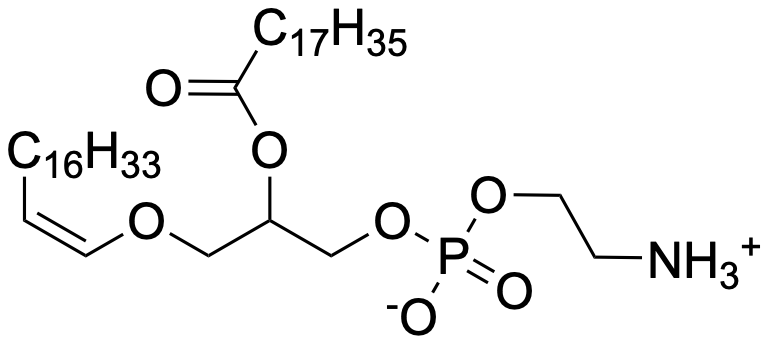
Example of an ethanolamine plasmalogen with the characteristic vinyl ether linkage at the sn-1 position and an ester linkage at the sn-2 position

Plasmalogens are a class of glycerophospholipid with a plasmenyl group linked to a lipid at the sn-1 position of the glycerol backbone. Plasmalogens are found in multiple domains of life, including mammals, invertebrates, protozoa, and anaerobic bacteria. They are commonly found in cell membranes in the nervous, immune, and cardiovascular systems. In humans, lower levels of plasmalogens are studied in relation to some diseases. Plasmalogens are also associated with adaptations to extreme environments in non-human organisms.

== Structure ==
Glycerophospholipids of biochemical relevance are divided into three subclasses based on the substitution present at the sn-1 position of the glycerol backbone: acyl, alkyl and alkenyl. Of these, the alkyl and alkenyl moiety in each case form an ether bond, which makes for two types of ether phospholipids, plasmanyl (alkyl moiety at sn-1), and plasmenyl (alkenyl moiety with vinyl ether linkage at sn-1). Plasmalogens are plasmenyls with an ester (acyl group) linked lipid at the sn-2 position of the glycerol backbone, chemically designated 1-0(1Z-alkenyl)-2-acyl-glycerophospholipids. The lipid attached to the vinyl ether at sn-1 can be C16:0, C18:0, or C18:1 (saturated and monounsaturated), and the lipid attached to the acyl group at sn-2 can be C22:6 ω-3 (docosahexaenoic acid) or C20:4 ω-6 (arachidonic acid), (both are polyunsaturated acids). Plasmalogens are classified according to their head group, mainly as PC plasmalogens (plasmenylcholines) and PE plasmalogens (plasmenylethanolamines). Plasmalogens should not be confused with plasmanyls.

== Functions ==
Plasmalogens are found in numerous human tissues, with particular enrichment in the nervous, immune, and cardiovascular systems. In human heart tissue, nearly 30–40% of choline glycerophospholipids are plasmalogens. 32% of the glycerophospholipids in the adult human heart, 20% in the brain and up to 70% of myelin sheath ethanolamine glycerophospholipids are plasmalogens.

Although the functions of plasmalogens have not yet been fully elucidated, it has been demonstrated that they can protect mammalian cells against the damaging effects of reactive oxygen species. In addition, they have been implicated as being signaling molecules and modulators of membrane dynamics.

== History ==
Plasmalogens were first described by Feulgen and Voit in 1924 based on studies of tissue sections. They treated these tissue sections with acid or mercuric chloride as part of a method to stain the nucleus. This resulted in the breakage of the plasmalogen vinyl-ether bond to yield aldehydes. In turn, the latter reacted with a fuchsine-sulfurous acid stain used in this nuclear staining method and gave rise to colored compounds inside the cytoplasm of the cells. Plasmalogens were named based on the fact that these colored compounds were present in the "plasmal" or inside of the cell.

== Biosynthesis ==
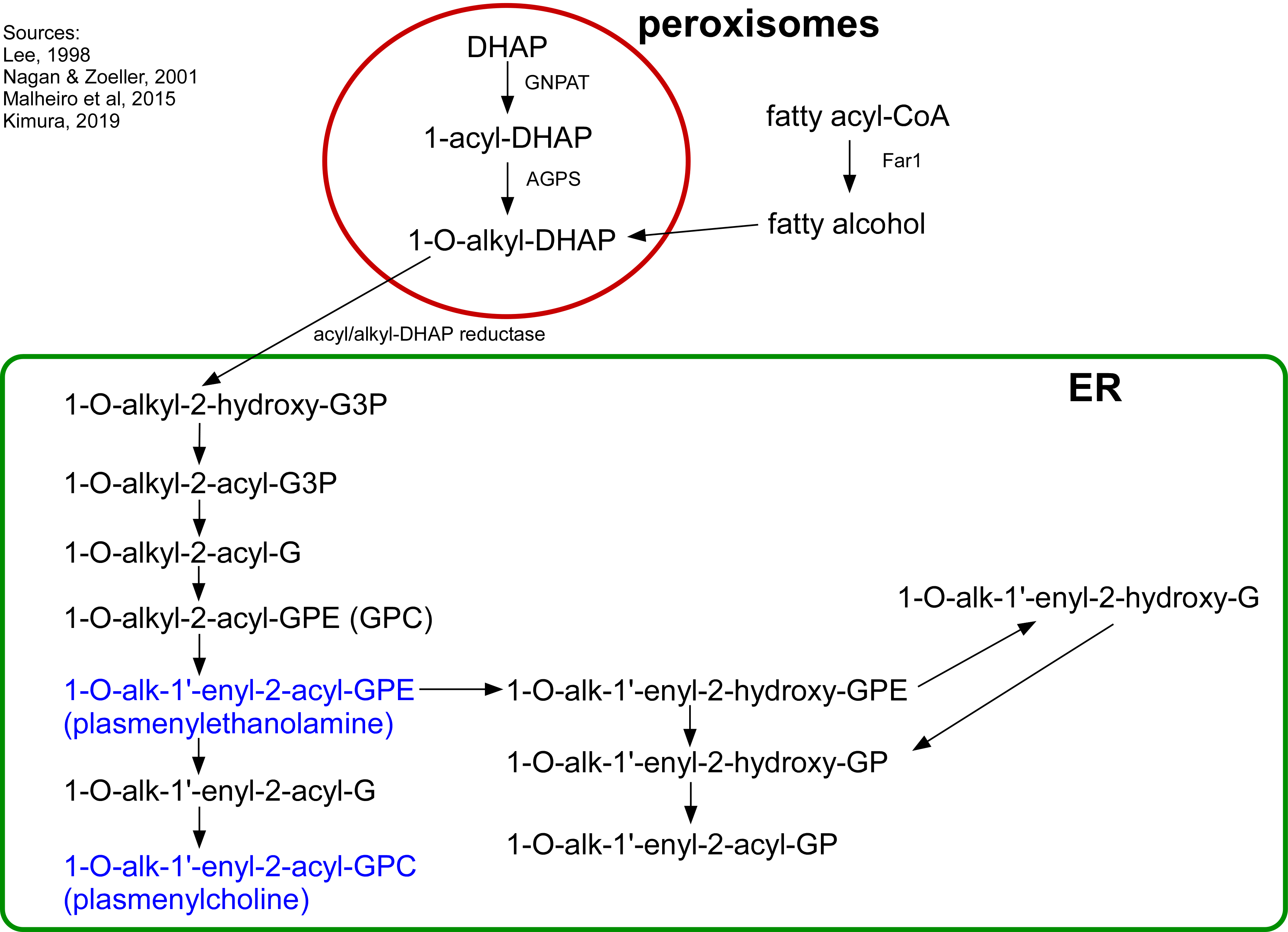
Pathway of plasmalogen synthesis

Biosynthesis of plasmalogens begins with association of peroxisomal matrix enzymes glyceronephosphate O-acyltransferase (GNPAT) and alkylglycerone phosphate synthase (AGPS) on the luminal side of the peroxisomal membrane. These two enzymes can interact with each other to increase efficiency. Therefore, fibroblasts without AGPS activity have a reduced GNPAT level and activity.

The first step of the biosynthesis is catalyzed by GNPAT. This enzyme acylates dihydroxyacetone phosphate at the sn-1 position. This is followed by the exchange of the acyl group for an alkyl group by AGPS. The 1-alkyl-DHAPdihydroxyacetone phosphate is then reduced to 1-O-alkyl-2-hydroxy-sn-glycerophosphate (GPA) by an acyl/alkyl-dihydroxyacetone phosphate reductase located in both peroxisomal and endoplasmatic reticulum membranes. All other modifications occur in the endoplasmatic reticulum. There an acyl group is placed at the sn-2 position by an alkyl/acyl GPA acyltransferase and the phosphate group is removed by a phosphatidic acid phosphatase to form 1-O-alkyl-2-acyl-sn-glycerol.

Using CDP-ethanolamine a phosphotransferase forms 1-O-alkyl-2-acyl-sn-GPEtn. After dehydrogenation at the 1- and 2-positions of the alkyl group by an electron transport system and plasmanylethanolamine desaturase the vinyl ether bond of plasmalogens is finally formed. The protein corresponding to plasmanylethanolamine desaturase has been identified and is called CarF in bacteria and PEDS1 (TMEM189) in humans (and animals).

Plasmenylcholine is formed from 1-O-alkyl-2-acyl-sn-glycerol by choline phosphotransferase. As there is no plasmenylcholine desaturase choline plasmalogens can be formed only after hydrolysis of ethanolamine plasmalogens to 1-O-(1Z-alkenyl)-2-acyl-sn-glycerol that can be modified by choline phosphotransferase and CDP choline.

== Pathology ==
Peroxisome biogenesis disorders are autosomal recessive disorders often characterized by impaired plasmalogen biosynthesis. In these cases, the peroxisomal enzyme GNPAT, necessary for the initial steps of plasmalogen biosynthesis, is mislocalized to the cytoplasm where it is inactive. In addition, genetic mutations in the GNPAT or AGPS genes can result in plasmalogen deficiencies, which lead to the development of rhizomelic chondrodysplasia punctata (RCDP) type 2 or 3, respectively. In such cases, both copies of the GNPAT or AGPS gene must be mutated in order for disease to manifest. Unlike the peroxisome biogenesis disorders, other aspects of peroxisome assembly in RCDP2 and RCDP3 patients are normal as is their ability to metabolize very long chain fatty acids. Individuals with severe plasmalogen deficiencies frequently show abnormal neurological development, skeletal malformation, impaired respiration, and cataracts.

Deficits in plasmalogen levels contribute to pathology in Zellweger syndrome.

Plasmalogen-knockout mice show similar alterations like arrest of spermatogenesis, development of cataract and defects in central nervous system myelination.

Plasmalogen alkyl chains have been shown to promote or inhibit the cell death from ferroptosis, depending on their degree of saturation.

=== During inflammation ===
During inflammation, neutrophil-derived myeloperoxidase produces hypochlorous acid, which causes oxidative chlorination of plasmalogens at the sn-1 chain by reacting with the vinyl ether bond. Several researchers are currently investigating the impact of chlorinated lipids on pathology.

== Possible disease links ==
The lack of good methods to assay plasmalogen has created difficulties for scientists to assess how plasmalogen might be involved in human diseases other than RCDP and Zellweger spectrum, in which the involvement is certain. There is some evidence in humans that low plasmalogens are involved in the pathology of bronchopulmonary dysplasia, which is an important complication of premature birth. One study showed that plasmalogen levels are reduced in people with chronic obstructive pulmonary disease (COPD) who smoked compared with non-smokers.

There is some evidence from humans and animals that there are reduced levels of plasmalogens in the brain in neurodegenerative disorders including Alzheimer's disease, Parkinson's disease, Niemann–Pick disease type C, Down syndrome, and multiple sclerosis, it is not clear if this is causal or correlative. A study with mice concluded that plasmalogens can eliminate aging-associated synaptic defects.

More recently, population studies have also associated lower circulating plasmalogen levels with cardiometabolic disease. Animal studies have also demonstrated lower cardiac plasmalogen levels under settings of dilated cardiomyopathy and myocardial infarction.

== Evolution ==
=== In bacteria ===
Plasmalogens are found in bacteria, but there are two separate biosynthetic pathways. One is the aerobic oxidation pathway of Myxobacteria based on the plasmanylethanolamine desaturase (CarF), which is homologous to the animal (and thus human) pathway. The other is the anaerobic reduction pathway of Clostridia, Megasphaera, and Veillonella, which instead generates plasmalogen directly from an ester. The fact that there are two different pathways suggest that plasmalogens have evolved twice in the history of life.

=== Among eukaryotes ===
Eukaryotes inherited an aerobic oxidation pathway from bacteria. In addition to mammals, plasmalogens are also found in invertebrates and single cell organisms loosely grouped as protozoans.

Plasmalogens form a major component in the cell membranes of deep-sea animals like the comb jelly, enhancing molecular resistance to high pressure.

==== Among primates ====
In 2011 it was reported that the red blood cells of humans and great apes (chimpanzees, gorillas and orangutans) have differences in their plasmalogen composition. Total RBC plasmalogen levels were found to be lower in humans than in chimpanzees, or gorillas, but higher than in orangutans. Gene expression data from all these species caused the authors to speculate that other human and great ape cells and tissues differ in plasmalogen levels. Although the consequences of these potential differences are unknown, cross-species differences in tissue plasmalogens could influence organ functions and multiple biological processes.

== See also ==
- Ether lipid
