= PEX16 =

Protein-coding gene in the species Homo sapiens

Identifiers
- Aliases: PEX16, PBD8A, PBD8B, peroxisomal biogenesis factor 16
- External IDs: OMIM: 603360; MGI: 1338829; GeneCards: PEX16

Gene location (Human)
Chr.	Chromosome 11 (human)
Band	11p11.2	Start	45,909,663 bp
Band	11p11.2	End	45,918,812 bp

Gene location (Mouse)
Chr.	Chromosome 2 (mouse)
Band	2|2 E1	Start	92,205,021 bp
Band	2|2 E1	End	92,211,562 bp
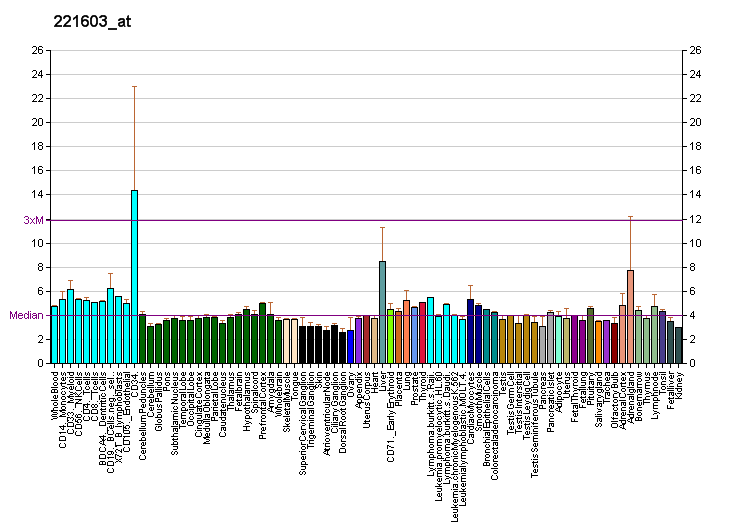

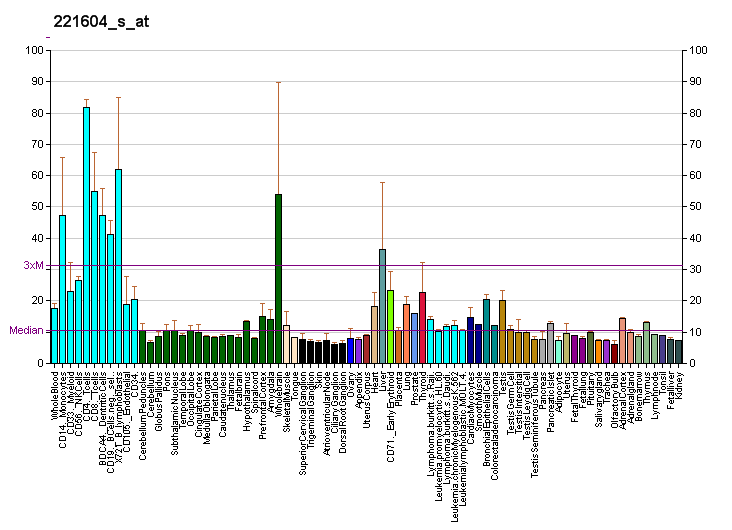

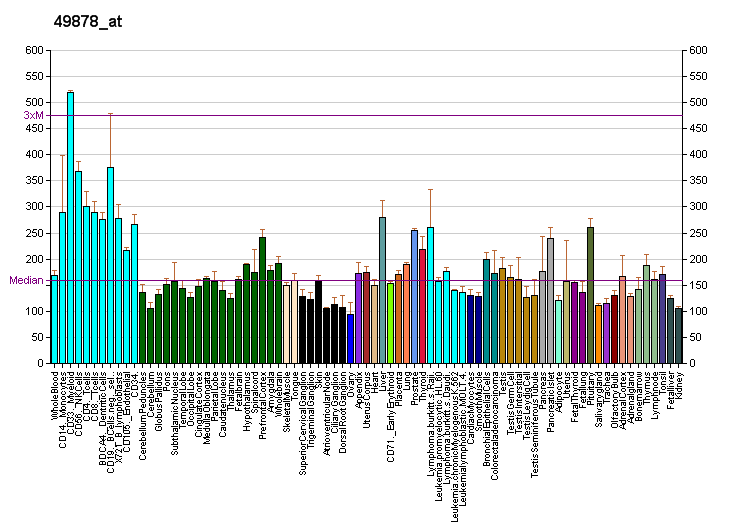
RNA expression pattern
Bgee	Human / Mouse (ortholog); Top expressed in: prefrontal cortex; granulocyte; right lobe of liver; anterior pituitary; C1 segment; body of pancreas; mucosa of transverse colon; endothelial cell; right frontal lobe; anterior cingulate cortex / Top expressed in: left lobe of liver; morula; right kidney; lip; brown adipose tissue; subcutaneous adipose tissue; white adipose tissue; gastrula; duodenum; proximal tubule; More reference expression data
BioGPS	More reference expression data
Gene ontology
Molecular function	protein C-terminus binding; protein binding
Cellular component	integral component of membrane; peroxisomal membrane; peroxisome; endoplasmic reticulum membrane; endoplasmic reticulum; membrane; integral component of peroxisomal membrane
Biological process	protein targeting to peroxisome; protein localization to endoplasmic reticulum; peroxisome membrane biogenesis; peroxisome organization; protein import into peroxisome matrix; protein to membrane docking; ER-dependent peroxisome organization; protein import into peroxisome membrane; ER-dependent peroxisome localization
Sources:Amigo / QuickGO
Orthologs
Databases	NCBI: entry; OMA: entry
Species	Human	Mouse
Entrez	9409	18633
Ensembl	ENSG00000121680	ENSMUSG00000027222
UniProt	Q9Y5Y5	Q91XC9
RefSeq (mRNA)	NM_004813; NM_057174	NM_145122
RefSeq (protein)	NP_004804; NP_476515	NP_660104
Location (UCSC)	Chr 11: 45.91 – 45.92 Mb	Chr 2: 92.21 – 92.21 Mb
PubMed search
- Wikidata
View/Edit Human	View/Edit Mouse

Peroxisomal membrane protein PEX16 is a protein that in humans is encoded by the PEX16 gene.

== Function ==
The protein encoded by this gene is an integral peroxisomal membrane protein. An inactivating nonsense mutation localized to this gene was observed in a patient with Zellweger syndrome of the complementation group CGD/CG9. Expression of this gene product morphologically and biochemically restores the formation of new peroxisomes, suggesting a role in peroxisome organization and biogenesis. Alternative splicing has been observed for this gene and two variants have been described.

== Interactions ==
PEX16 has been shown to interact with PEX19.
