= PEX10 =

Protein-coding gene in humans

Identifiers
- Aliases: PEX10, NALD, PBD6A, PBD6B, RNF69, peroxisomal biogenesis factor 10
- External IDs: OMIM: 602859; MGI: 2684988; GeneCards: PEX10
Enzyme activity
EC #	BRENDA	ExPASy	KEGG	MetaCyc
2.3.2.27	↗	↗	↗	↗

Gene location (Human)
Chr.	Chromosome 1 (human)
Band	1p36.32	Start	2,403,964 bp
Band	1p36.32	End	2,413,797 bp

Gene location (Mouse)
Chr.	Chromosome 4 (mouse)
Band	4|4 E2	Start	155,151,473 bp
Band	4|4 E2	End	155,156,890 bp
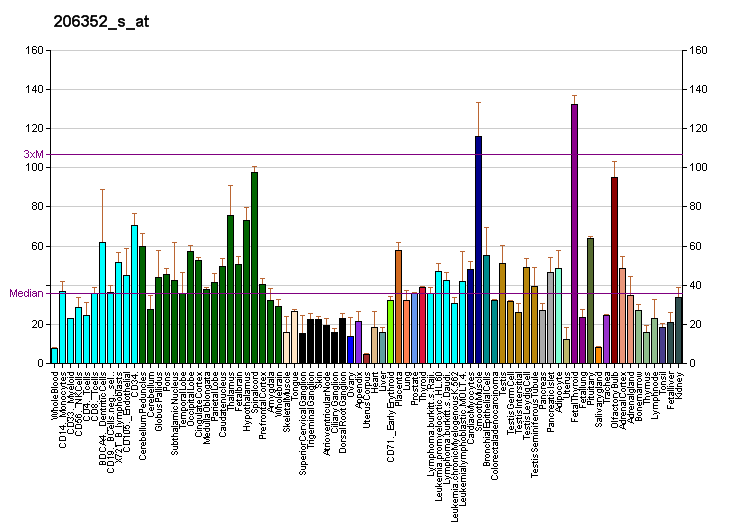

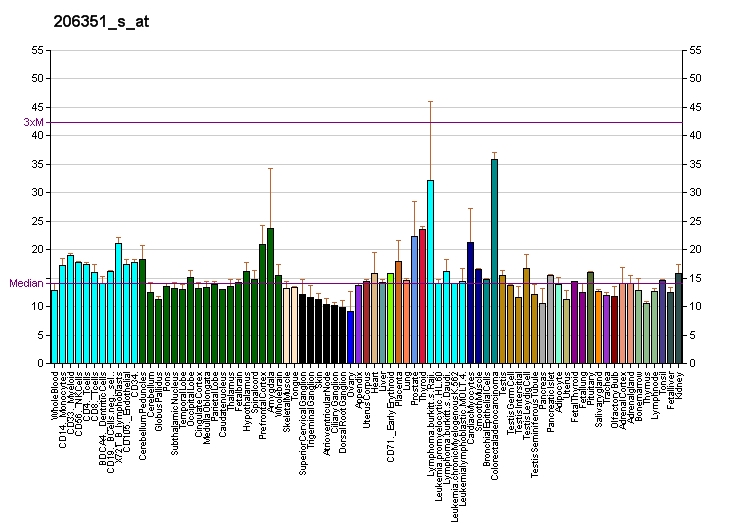
RNA expression pattern
Bgee	Human / Mouse (ortholog); Top expressed in: parotid gland; tendon of biceps brachii; C1 segment; right adrenal cortex; left adrenal gland; left adrenal cortex; amygdala; internal globus pallidus; left testis; right testis / Top expressed in: yolk sac; hand; aortic valve; otolith organ; utricle; neural layer of retina; muscle of thigh; right kidney; ascending aorta; soleus muscle; More reference expression data
BioGPS	More reference expression data
Gene ontology
Molecular function	zinc ion binding; protein C-terminus binding; protein binding; metal ion binding
Cellular component	peroxisome; membrane; integral component of peroxisomal membrane; intracellular anatomical structure; peroxisomal membrane
Biological process	peroxisome organization; protein import into peroxisome matrix; protein ubiquitination; protein targeting to peroxisome
Sources:Amigo / QuickGO
Orthologs
Databases	NCBI: entry; OMA: entry
Species	Human	Mouse
Entrez	5192	668173
Ensembl	ENSG00000157911	ENSMUSG00000029047
UniProt	O60683	B1AUE5
RefSeq (mRNA)	NM_002617; NM_153818; NM_001374425; NM_001374426; NM_001374427	NM_001042407
RefSeq (protein)	NP_002608; NP_722540; NP_001361354; NP_001361355; NP_001361356	NP_001035866
Location (UCSC)	Chr 1: 2.4 – 2.41 Mb	Chr 4: 155.15 – 155.16 Mb
PubMed search
- Wikidata
View/Edit Human	View/Edit Mouse

Peroxisome biogenesis factor 10 is a protein that in humans is encoded by the PEX10 gene. Alternative splicing results in two transcript variants encoding different isoforms.

== Function ==
Peroxisome biogenesis factor 10 is involved in import of peroxisomal matrix proteins. This protein localizes to the peroxisomal membrane.

== Clinical significance ==
Mutations in this gene result in phenotypes within the Zellweger spectrum of peroxisomal biogenesis disorders, ranging from neonatal adrenoleukodystrophy to Zellweger syndrome.

== Interactions ==
PEX10 has been shown to interact with PEX12 and PEX19.
