= Peroxin-7 =

Family of transport proteins

PEX7

Identifiers
- Aliases: PEX7, PBD9B, PTS2R, RCDP1, RD, peroxisomal biogenesis factor 7
- External IDs: OMIM: 601757; MGI: 1321392; GeneCards: PEX7

Gene location (Human)
Chr.	Chromosome 6 (human)
Band	6q23.3	Start	136,822,564 bp
Band	6q23.3	End	136,913,934 bp

Gene location (Mouse)
Chr.	Chromosome 10 (mouse)
Band	10|10 A3	Start	19,729,646 bp
Band	10|10 A3	End	19,783,435 bp
RNA expression pattern
Bgee	Human / Mouse (ortholog); Top expressed in: retinal pigment epithelium; sperm; right adrenal gland; right adrenal cortex; left adrenal gland; secondary oocyte; gonad; body of pancreas; left adrenal cortex; kidney tubule / Top expressed in: left lobe of liver; right kidney; right ventricle; triceps brachii muscle; spermatocyte; proximal tubule; sternocleidomastoid muscle; epithelium of stomach; pyloric antrum; brown adipose tissue; More reference expression data
BioGPS	n/a
Gene ontology
Molecular function	enzyme binding; peroxisome matrix targeting signal-2 binding; protein homodimerization activity
Cellular component	cytoplasm; peroxisome; peroxisomal matrix; peroxisomal membrane; cytosol
Biological process	protein transport; fatty acid beta-oxidation; peroxisome organization; neuron migration; protein import into peroxisome matrix; endochondral ossification; ether lipid biosynthetic process; protein targeting to peroxisome
Sources:Amigo / QuickGO
Orthologs
Databases	NCBI: entry; OMA: entry
Species	Human	Mouse
Entrez	5191	18634
Ensembl	ENSG00000112357	ENSMUSG00000020003
UniProt	O00628	P97865
RefSeq (mRNA)	NM_000288	NM_001161825; NM_008822
RefSeq (protein)	NP_000279	NP_001155297; NP_032848
Location (UCSC)	Chr 6: 136.82 – 136.91 Mb	Chr 10: 19.73 – 19.78 Mb
PubMed search
- Wikidata
View/Edit Human	View/Edit Mouse

peroxisomal biogenesis factor 7

Identifiers
- Symbol: PEX7
- NCBI gene: 5191
- HGNC: 8860
- OMIM: 601757
- RefSeq: NM_000288
- UniProt: O00628

Other data
- Locus: Chr. 6 q21-q22.2
Search for
- Structures: Swiss-model
- Domains: InterPro

Peroxin-7 is a receptor associated with Refsum's disease and rhizomelic chondrodysplasia punctata type 1. Peroxin-7 is encoded in humans by the PEX7 gene.

== See also ==
- Peroxin
