= PEX19 =

Protein-coding gene in humans

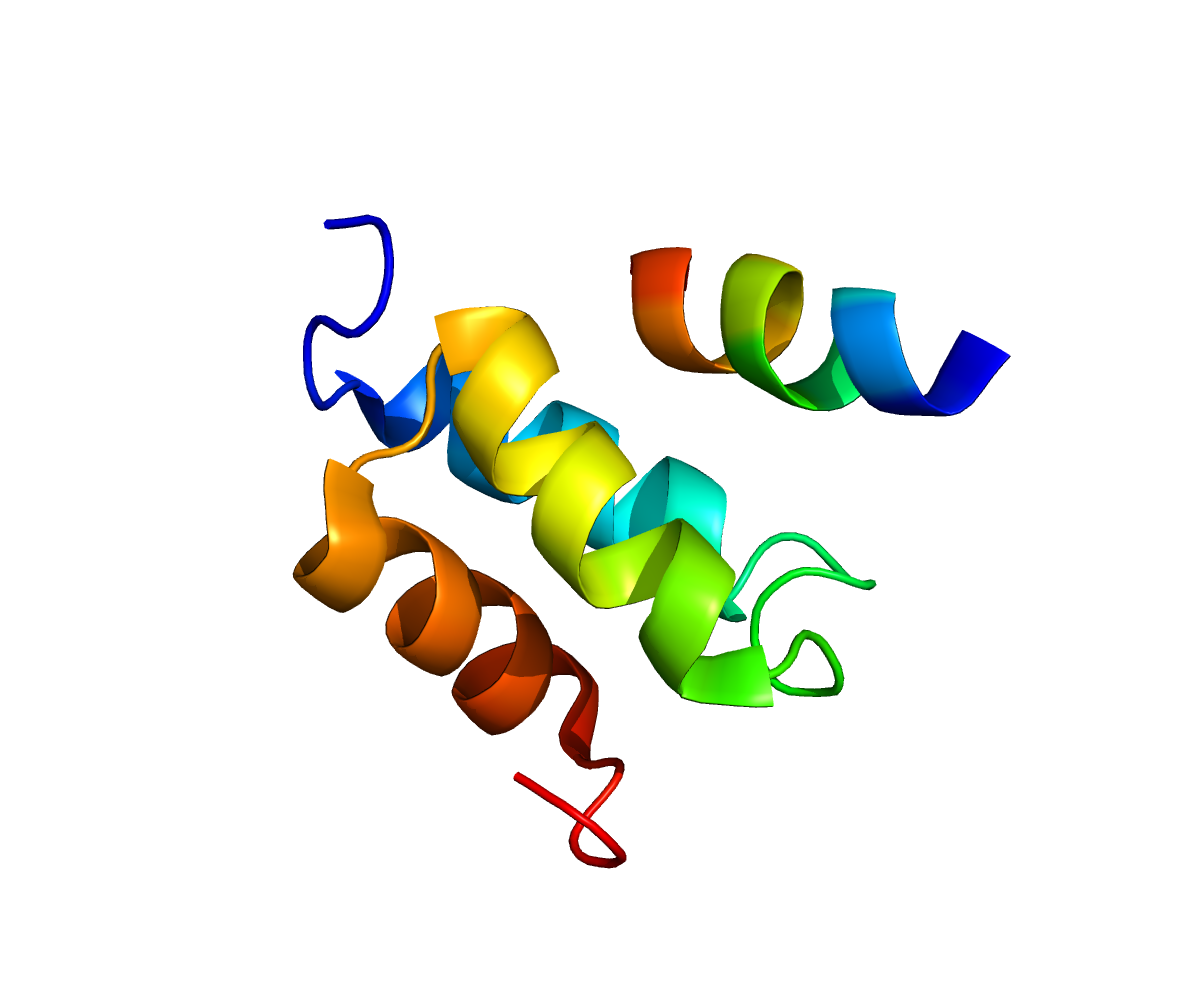

Identifiers
- Aliases: PEX19, D1S2223E, HK33, PBD12A, PMP1, PMPI, PXF, PXMP1, peroxisomal biogenesis factor 19
- External IDs: OMIM: 600279; MGI: 1334458; GeneCards: PEX19
Available structures
PDB	Ortholog search: PDBe RCSB
PDB	List of PDB id codes 2W85, 2WL8, 3AJB, 3MK4

Gene location (Human)
Chr.	Chromosome 1 (human)
Band	1q23.2	Start	160,276,807 bp
Band	1q23.2	End	160,286,348 bp

Gene location (Mouse)
Chr.	Chromosome 1 (mouse)
Band	1 H3|1 79.54 cM	Start	171,954,322 bp
Band	1 H3|1 79.54 cM	End	171,964,060 bp
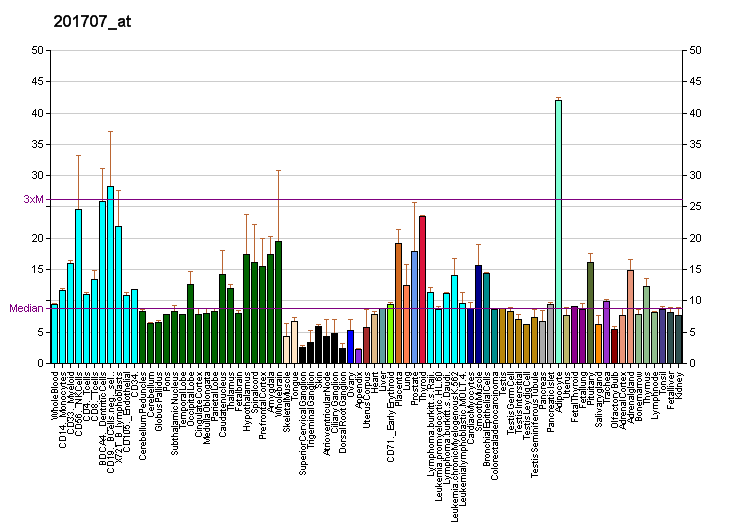

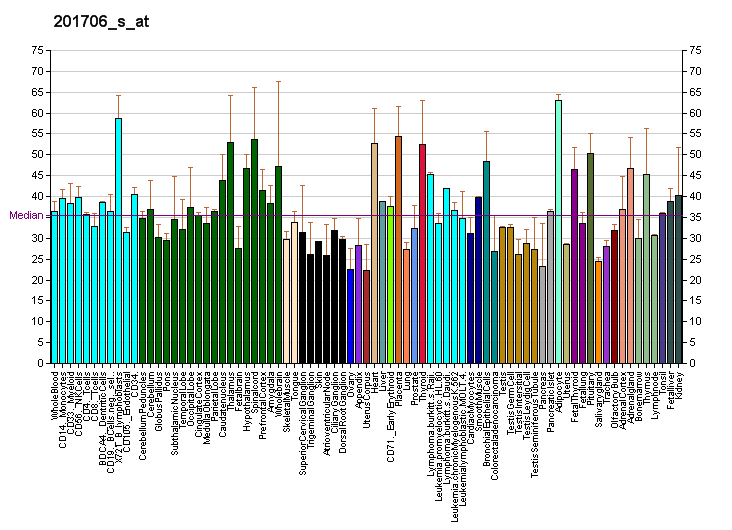
RNA expression pattern
Bgee	Human / Mouse (ortholog); Top expressed in: muscle of thigh; gastrocnemius muscle; Skeletal muscle tissue of biceps brachii; ventricular zone; epithelium of colon; abdominal fat; thoracic diaphragm; subcutaneous adipose tissue; islet of Langerhans; right lobe of liver / Top expressed in: yolk sac; tail of embryo; lip; muscle of thigh; right kidney; ventricular zone; digastric muscle; temporal muscle; brown adipose tissue; triceps brachii muscle; More reference expression data
BioGPS	More reference expression data
Gene ontology
Molecular function	peroxisome membrane class-1 targeting sequence binding; protein N-terminus binding; ATPase binding; protein binding
Cellular component	cytoplasm; integral component of membrane; cytosol; membrane; peroxisomal membrane; peroxisome; nucleoplasm; brush border membrane; nucleus; protein-containing complex
Biological process	protein targeting to peroxisome; peroxisome organization; protein stabilization; peroxisome membrane biogenesis; peroxisome fission; protein import into peroxisome membrane; transmembrane transport; establishment of protein localization to peroxisome; negative regulation of lipid binding; chaperone-mediated protein folding
Sources:Amigo / QuickGO
Orthologs
Databases	NCBI: entry; OMA: entry
Species	Human	Mouse
Entrez	5824	19298
Ensembl	ENSG00000162735	ENSMUSG00000003464
UniProt	P40855	Q8VCI5
RefSeq (mRNA)	NM_001131039; NM_001193644; NM_002857	NM_001159525; NM_023041; NM_001356513; NM_001356514
RefSeq (protein)	NP_001180573; NP_002848	NP_001152997; NP_075528; NP_001343442; NP_001343443
Location (UCSC)	Chr 1: 160.28 – 160.29 Mb	Chr 1: 171.95 – 171.96 Mb
PubMed search
- Wikidata
View/Edit Human	View/Edit Mouse

Peroxisomal biogenesis factor 19 is a protein that in humans is encoded by the PEX19 gene.

== Interactions ==
PEX19 has been shown to interact with:

- ABCD1,
- ABCD2,
- ABCD3,
- PEX10,
- PEX11B,
- PEX12,
- PEX13,
- PEX16, and
- PEX3.
