= PEX3 =

Protein-coding gene in the species Homo sapiens

Identifiers
- Aliases: PEX3, PBD10A, TRG18, peroxisomal biogenesis factor 3, PBD10B
- External IDs: OMIM: 603164; MGI: 1929646; GeneCards: PEX3
Available structures
PDB	Ortholog search: PDBe RCSB
PDB	List of PDB id codes 3AJB, 3MK4

Gene location (Human)
Chr.	Chromosome 6 (human)
Band	6q24.2	Start	143,450,805 bp
Band	6q24.2	End	143,490,616 bp

Gene location (Mouse)
Chr.	Chromosome 10 (mouse)
Band	10|10 A2	Start	13,399,586 bp
Band	10|10 A2	End	13,428,886 bp
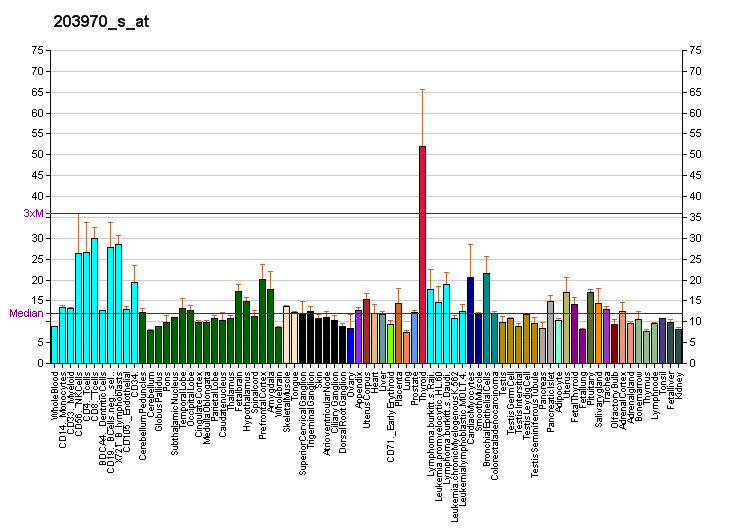

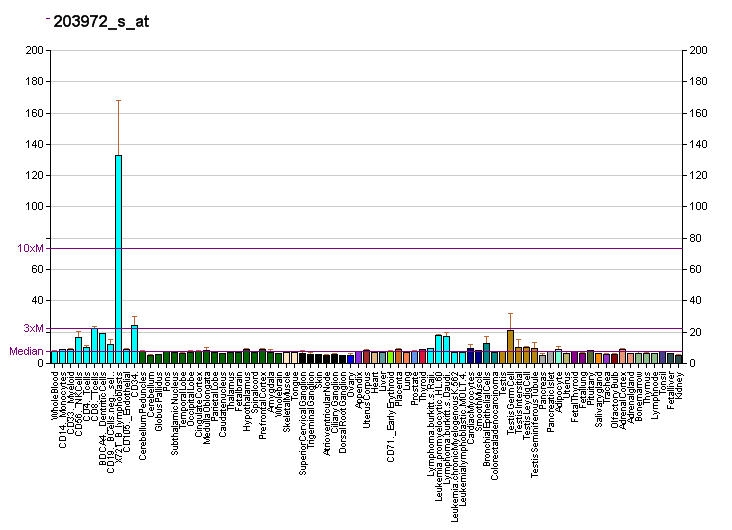
RNA expression pattern
Bgee	Human / Mouse (ortholog); Top expressed in: endothelial cell; right adrenal cortex; left adrenal gland; left adrenal cortex; oocyte; skin of thigh; human penis; renal medulla; testicle; vulva / Top expressed in: spermatid; seminiferous tubule; skin of external ear; brown adipose tissue; seminal vesicula; spermatocyte; tunica adventitia of aorta; white adipose tissue; Epithelium of choroid plexus; left lobe of liver; More reference expression data
BioGPS	More reference expression data
Gene ontology
Molecular function	protein dimerization activity; protein binding; lipid binding; protein-macromolecule adaptor activity
Cellular component	integral component of membrane; cytosol; membrane; peroxisomal membrane; peroxisome; nucleoplasm; protein-lipid complex; endoplasmic reticulum; integral component of peroxisomal membrane; protein-containing complex
Biological process	peroxisome organization; peroxisome membrane biogenesis; protein import into peroxisome membrane; transmembrane transport
Sources:Amigo / QuickGO
Orthologs
Databases	NCBI: entry; OMA: entry
Species	Human	Mouse
Entrez	8504	56535
Ensembl	ENSG00000034693	ENSMUSG00000019809
UniProt	P56589; Q7Z6V3	Q9QXY9
RefSeq (mRNA)	NM_003630	NM_001164195; NM_019961; NM_001347361
RefSeq (protein)	NP_003621	NP_001157667; NP_001334290; NP_064345
Location (UCSC)	Chr 6: 143.45 – 143.49 Mb	Chr 10: 13.4 – 13.43 Mb
PubMed search
- Wikidata
View/Edit Human	View/Edit Mouse

Peroxisomal biogenesis factor 3 is a protein that in humans is encoded by the PEX3 gene.

== Interactions ==
PEX3 has been shown to interact with PEX19.
