= PEX26 =

Protein-coding gene in the species Homo sapiens

Identifiers
- Aliases: PEX26, PBD7A, PBD7B, PEX26M1T, Pex26pM1T, peroxisomal biogenesis factor 26
- External IDs: OMIM: 608666; MGI: 1921293; GeneCards: PEX26

Gene location (Human)
Chr.	Chromosome 22 (human)
Band	22q11.21	Start	18,077,923 bp
Band	22q11.21	End	18,105,396 bp

Gene location (Mouse)
Chr.	Chromosome 6 (mouse)
Band	6|6 F1	Start	121,160,626 bp
Band	6|6 F1	End	121,175,796 bp
RNA expression pattern
Bgee	Human / Mouse (ortholog); Top expressed in: mucosa of transverse colon; tendon of biceps brachii; islet of Langerhans; prefrontal cortex; rectum; ganglionic eminence; stromal cell of endometrium; anterior cingulate cortex; duodenum; ventricular zone / Top expressed in: secondary oocyte; Paneth cell; primary oocyte; lacrimal gland; left lung lobe; medullary collecting duct; hair follicle; left lobe of liver; otic vesicle; transitional epithelium of urinary bladder; More reference expression data
BioGPS	n/a
Gene ontology
Molecular function	ATPase binding; protein C-terminus binding; protein binding; protein-containing complex binding
Cellular component	integral component of membrane; peroxisome; membrane; integral component of peroxisomal membrane; peroxisomal membrane
Biological process	protein transport; protein import into peroxisome matrix; protein import into peroxisome membrane; protein targeting to peroxisome
Sources:Amigo / QuickGO
Orthologs
Databases	NCBI: entry; OMA: entry
Species	Human	Mouse
Entrez	55670	74043
Ensembl	ENSG00000215193	ENSMUSG00000067825
UniProt	Q7Z412	Q8BGI5
RefSeq (mRNA)	NM_017929; NM_001127649; NM_001199319	NM_028730; NM_001304773; NM_001304774
RefSeq (protein)	NP_001121121; NP_001186248; NP_060399; NP_001121121.1; NP_060399.1	NP_001291702; NP_001291703; NP_083006
Location (UCSC)	Chr 22: 18.08 – 18.11 Mb	Chr 6: 121.16 – 121.18 Mb
PubMed search
- Wikidata
View/Edit Human	View/Edit Mouse

Peroxisome assembly protein 26 is a protein that in humans is encoded by the PEX26 gene.

== Interactions ==
PEX26 has been shown to interact with PEX1, PEX6 and SUFU.
