= Neonatal adrenoleukodystrophy =

- Other names: NALD

Neonatal adrenoleukodystrophy is an inborn error of peroxisome biogenesis. It is part of the Zellweger spectrum. It has been linked with multiple genes (at least five) associated with peroxisome biogenesis and has an autosomal recessive pattern of inheritance.
