= PEX5 =

Protein-coding gene in the species Homo sapiens

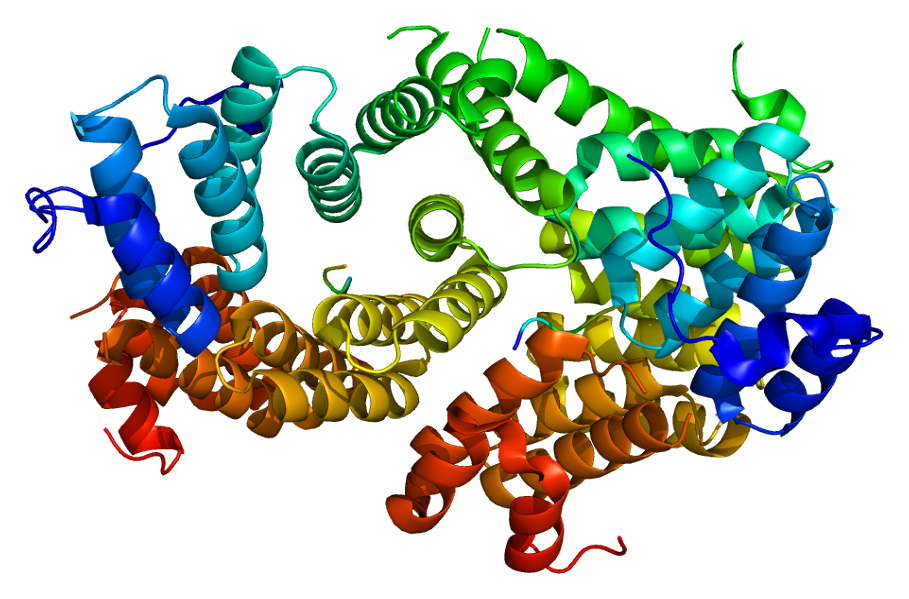

Identifiers
- Aliases: PEX5, peroxisomal biogenesis factor 5, RCDP5, PTS1R, PBD2B, PTS1-BP, PXR1, PBD2A
- External IDs: OMIM: 600414; MGI: 1098808; GeneCards: PEX5
Available structures
PDB	Ortholog search: PDBe RCSB
PDB	List of PDB id codes 1FCH, 2C0L, 2C0M, 2J9Q, 2W84, 3R9A, 4BXU, 4KXK, 4KYO

Gene location (Human)
Chr.	Chromosome 12 (human)
Band	12p13.31	Start	7,188,685 bp
Band	12p13.31	End	7,218,574 bp

Gene location (Mouse)
Chr.	Chromosome 6 (mouse)
Band	6 F2|6 59.15 cM	Start	124,373,775 bp
Band	6 F2|6 59.15 cM	End	124,392,026 bp
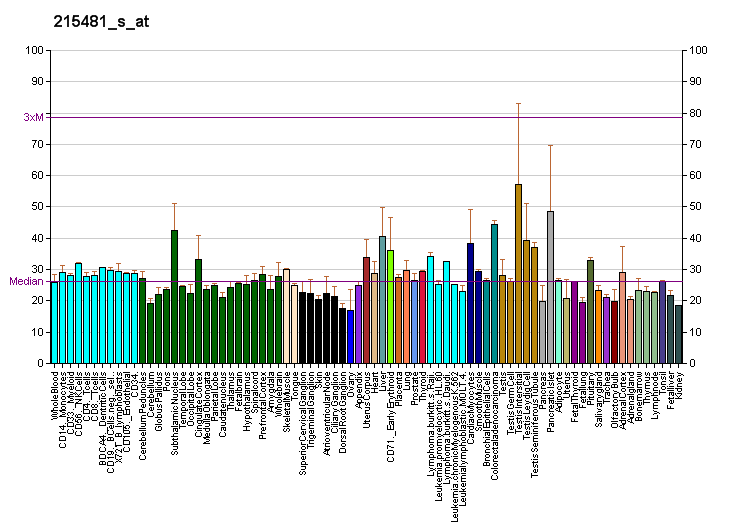

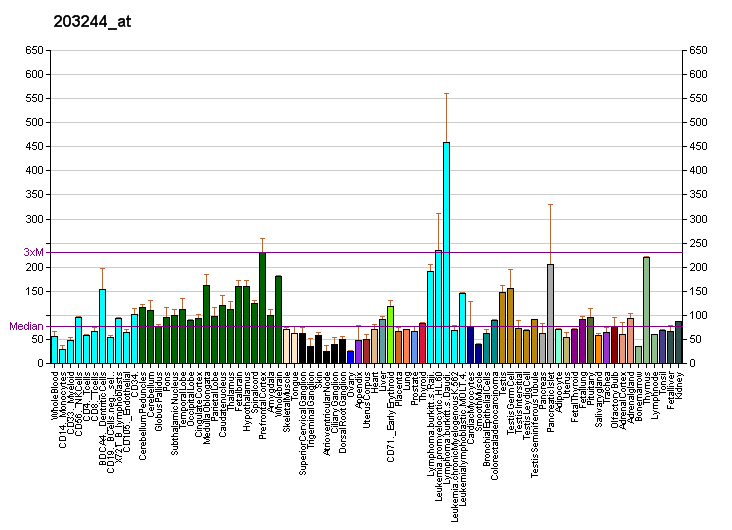
RNA expression pattern
Bgee	Human / Mouse (ortholog); Top expressed in: gastrocnemius muscle; left testis; right testis; C1 segment; skeletal muscle tissue; substantia nigra; prefrontal cortex; putamen; hippocampus proper; right frontal lobe / Top expressed in: right kidney; left lobe of liver; granulocyte; proximal tubule; lip; spermatocyte; muscle of thigh; ventricular zone; stroma of bone marrow; brown adipose tissue; More reference expression data
BioGPS	More reference expression data
Gene ontology
Molecular function	protein C-terminus binding; small GTPase binding; protein N-terminus binding; peroxisome targeting sequence binding; enzyme binding; protein binding; peroxisome matrix targeting signal-1 binding
Cellular component	cytoplasm; peroxisome; membrane; peroxisomal matrix; intracellular anatomical structure; Golgi apparatus; cytosol; peroxisomal membrane; protein-containing complex
Biological process	negative regulation of protein homotetramerization; protein import into peroxisome membrane; protein import into peroxisome matrix, docking; protein tetramerization; protein transport; protein targeting to peroxisome; protein import into peroxisome matrix, translocation; protein import into peroxisome matrix; protein ubiquitination; transport
Sources:Amigo / QuickGO
Orthologs
Databases	NCBI: entry; OMA: entry
Species	Human	Mouse
Entrez	5830	19305
Ensembl	ENSG00000139197; ENSG00000288217	ENSMUSG00000005069
UniProt	P50542	O09012
RefSeq (mRNA)	NM_000319; NM_001131023; NM_001131024; NM_001131025; NM_001131026 NM_001300789; NM_001351124; NM_001351126; NM_001351127; NM_001351128; NM_001351130; NM_001351131; NM_001351132; NM_001351133; NM_001351134; NM_001351135; NM_001351136; NM_001351137; NM_001351138; NM_001351139; NM_001351140; NM_001374645; NM_001374646; NM_001374647; NM_001374648; NM_001374649	NM_001277330; NM_001277805; NM_008995; NM_175933; NM_001360570
RefSeq (protein)	NP_000310; NP_001124495; NP_001124496; NP_001124497; NP_001124498 NP_001287718; NP_001338053; NP_001338055; NP_001338056; NP_001338057; NP_001338059; NP_001338060; NP_001338061; NP_001338062; NP_001338063; NP_001338064; NP_001338065; NP_001338066; NP_001338067; NP_001338068; NP_001338069	NP_001264259; NP_001264734; NP_033021; NP_787947; NP_001347499
Location (UCSC)	Chr 12: 7.19 – 7.22 Mb	Chr 6: 124.37 – 124.39 Mb
PubMed search
- Wikidata
View/Edit Human	View/Edit Mouse

Peroxisomal targeting signal 1 receptor (PTS1R) is a protein that in humans is encoded by the PEX5 gene.

PTS1R is a peroxisomal targeting sequence involved in the specific transport of molecules for oxidation inside the peroxisome. SKL binds to PTS1R in the cytosol followed by binding to the Pex14p receptor allowing importation of the peroxisomal protein through the pexsubunit transporter.

Diseases associated with dysfunctional PTS1R receptors include X-linked adrenoleukodystrophy and Zellweger syndrome.

== Interactions ==
PEX5 has been shown to interact with PEX12, PEX13 and PEX14.
