= Peroxisomal biogenesis factor 11 =

Peroxisomal membrane protein

Peroxisomal biogenesis factor 11 (PEX11)

Identifiers
- Symbol: PEX11
- Pfam: PF05648
- InterPro: IPR008733
- Membranome: 191
Available protein structures:
- PDB: IPR008733 PF05648 (ECOD; PDBsum)
- AlphaFold: IPR008733; PF05648

Peroxisomal biogenesis factor 11 (PEX11) are peroxisomal membrane proteins which promote peroxisome division in eukaryotic cells.

== Human proteins from this family ==
- PEX11A
- PEX11B
- PEX11G
