= PDZK1 =

Protein-coding gene in humans

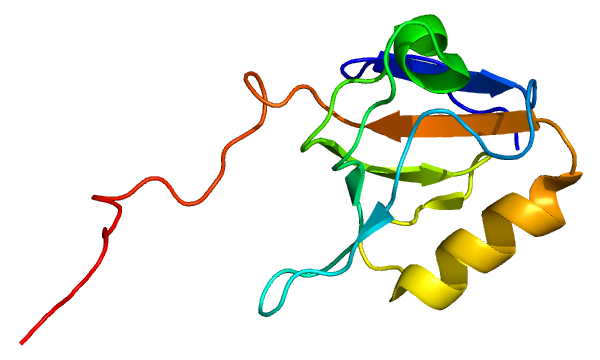

Identifiers
- Aliases: PDZK1, CAP70, CLAMP, NHERF-3, NHERF3, PDZD1, PDZ domain containing 1
- External IDs: OMIM: 603831; MGI: 1928901; GeneCards: PDZK1
Available structures
PDB	Ortholog search: PDBe RCSB
PDB	List of PDB id codes 2EEI, 2EEJ, 2VSP, 3TMH, 4Q2P

Gene location (Human)
Chr.	Chromosome 1 (human)
Band	1q21.1	Start	145,670,852 bp
Band	1q21.1	End	145,708,148 bp

Gene location (Mouse)
Chr.	Chromosome 3 (mouse)
Band	3|3 F2.1	Start	96,736,600 bp
Band	3|3 F2.1	End	96,778,242 bp
RNA expression pattern
Bgee	Human / Mouse (ortholog); Top expressed in: duodenum; right lobe of liver; cerebellar cortex; cerebellar hemisphere; gallbladder; human kidney; right hemisphere of cerebellum; body of pancreas; islet of Langerhans; testicle / Top expressed in: right kidney; human kidney; proximal tubule; efferent ductule; yolk sac; seminiferous tubule; jejunum; spermatid; primary oocyte; ileum; More reference expression data
BioGPS	n/a
Gene ontology
Molecular function	scavenger receptor binding; protein-containing complex binding; PDZ domain binding; protein binding; transporter activity
Cellular component	membrane raft; brush border membrane; plasma membrane; extracellular exosome; apical plasma membrane; membrane; microvillus membrane
Biological process	cell population proliferation; carnitine transport; positive regulation of ion transmembrane transport; regulation of anion transport; positive regulation of protein targeting to membrane; transport; positive regulation of ion transmembrane transporter activity; positive regulation of cation transmembrane transport; xenobiotic detoxification by transmembrane export across the plasma membrane
Sources:Amigo / QuickGO
Orthologs
Databases	NCBI: entry; OMA: entry
Species	Human	Mouse
Entrez	5174	59020
Ensembl	ENSG00000174827	ENSMUSG00000038298
UniProt	Q5T2W1	Q9JIL4
RefSeq (mRNA)	NM_001201325; NM_001201326; NM_002614	NM_001146001; NM_021517; NM_001355710
RefSeq (protein)	NP_001188254; NP_001188255; NP_002605; NP_001358288; NP_001358290	NP_001139473; NP_067492; NP_001342639
Location (UCSC)	Chr 1: 145.67 – 145.71 Mb	Chr 3: 96.74 – 96.78 Mb
PubMed search
- Wikidata
View/Edit Human	View/Edit Mouse

Na(+)/H(+) exchange regulatory cofactor NHE-RF3 is a protein that in humans is encoded by the PDZK1 gene.

== Interactions ==
PDZK1 has been shown to interact with:

- AKAP10,
- CLCN3,
- Cystic fibrosis transmembrane conductance regulator
- FARP2,
- PDZK1IP1,
- SLC22A12,
- SLC22A4,
- SLC34A3,
- SLK, and
- Sodium-hydrogen antiporter 3 regulator 1.

== Related gene problems ==
- TAR syndrome
- 1q21.1 deletion syndrome
- 1q21.1 duplication syndrome
