= LIX1L =

Protein-coding gene found in humans

Identifiers
- Aliases: LIX1L, limb and CNS expressed 1 like
- External IDs: MGI: 3036267; GeneCards: LIX1L

Gene location (Human)
Chr.	Chromosome 1 (human)
Band	1q21.1	Start	145,933,423 bp
Band	1q21.1	End	145,958,017 bp

Gene location (Mouse)
Chr.	Chromosome 3 (mouse)
Band	3|3 F2.1	Start	96,508,465 bp
Band	3|3 F2.1	End	96,533,487 bp
RNA expression pattern
Bgee	Human / Mouse (ortholog); Top expressed in: tibialis anterior muscle; cardiac muscle tissue of right atrium; myocardium of left ventricle; urethra; saphenous vein; superficial temporal artery; synovial membrane; tibia; parietal pleura; seminal vesicula / Top expressed in: endocardial cushion; atrioventricular valve; vas deferens; hand; Gonadal ridge; otolith organ; calvaria; iris; utricle; stroma of kidney; More reference expression data
BioGPS	n/a
Gene ontology
Molecular function	molecular function
Cellular component	cytoplasm; cellular component
Biological process	autophagosome maturation; biological process; autophagy
Sources:Amigo / QuickGO
Orthologs
Databases	NCBI: entry; OMA: entry
Species	Human	Mouse
Entrez	128077	280411
Ensembl	ENSG00000271601	ENSMUSG00000049288
UniProt	Q8IVB5	Q8BQ89
RefSeq (mRNA)	NM_153713	NM_001163170
RefSeq (protein)	NP_714924	NP_001156642
Location (UCSC)	Chr 1: 145.93 – 145.96 Mb	Chr 3: 96.51 – 96.53 Mb
PubMed search
- Wikidata
View/Edit Human	View/Edit Mouse

LIX1-like protein also known as LIX1L is a protein which in humans is encoded by the LIX1L gene.

== Related gene problems ==
- TAR syndrome
- 1q21.1 deletion syndrome
- 1q21.1 duplication syndrome
