= TXNIP =

Mammalian protein found in humans

Identifiers
- Aliases: TXNIP, thioredoxin interacting protein, EST01027, HHCPA78, THIF, VDUP1, ARRDC6
- External IDs: OMIM: 606599; MGI: 1889549; GeneCards: TXNIP
Available structures
PDB	Ortholog search: PDBe RCSB
PDB	List of PDB id codes 4GEI, 4GEJ, 4GFX, 4LL1, 4LL4, 4ROF, 4ROJ, 5CQ2, 5DF6, 5DWS, 5DZD

Gene location (Human)
Chr.	Chromosome 1 (human)
Band	1q21.1	Start	145,992,435 bp
Band	1q21.1	End	145,996,579 bp

Gene location (Mouse)
Chr.	Chromosome 3 (mouse)
Band	3 F2.1|3 41.93 cM	Start	96,465,273 bp
Band	3 F2.1|3 41.93 cM	End	96,469,199 bp
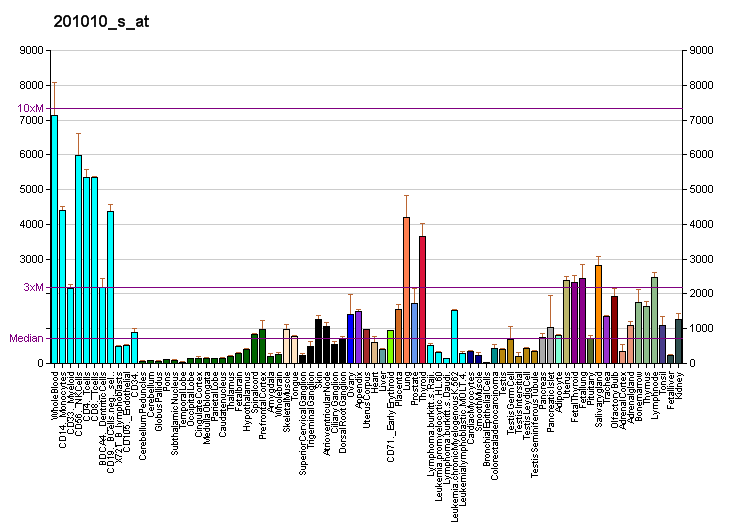

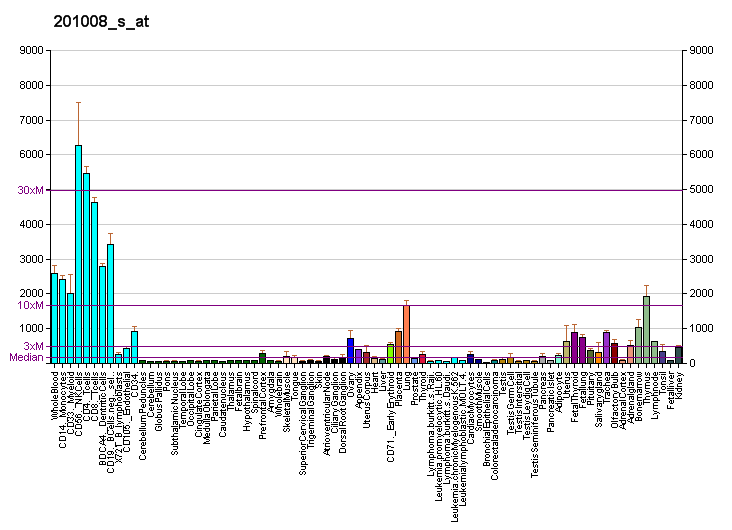

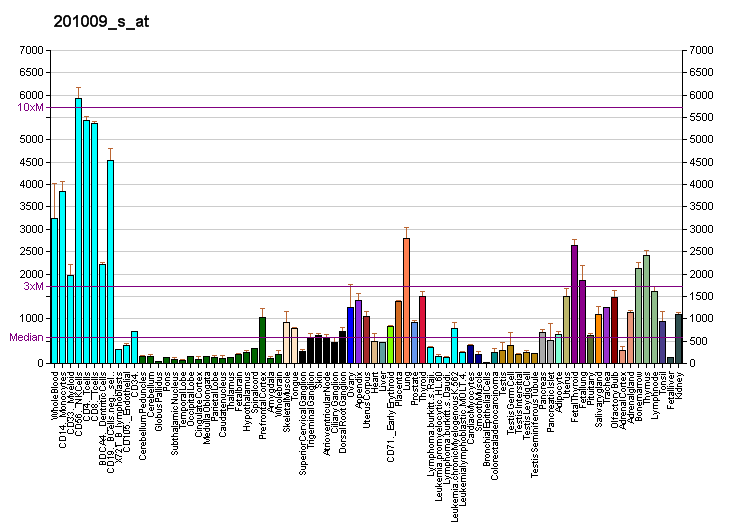
RNA expression pattern
Bgee	Human / Mouse (ortholog); Top expressed in: right lung; gastric mucosa; cardia; pericardium; skin of hip; renal medulla; deltoid muscle; canal of the cervix; nipple; glutes / Top expressed in: right lung; submandibular gland; right lung lobe; masseter muscle; left lung; muscle of thigh; brown adipose tissue; left lung lobe; secondary oocyte; gastrula; More reference expression data
BioGPS	More reference expression data
Gene ontology
Molecular function	enzyme inhibitor activity; protein binding; ubiquitin protein ligase binding
Cellular component	cytoplasm; cytosol; mitochondrial intermembrane space; nucleus
Biological process	cellular response to tumor cell; response to estradiol; negative regulation of catalytic activity; regulation of transcription, DNA-templated; protein import into nucleus; response to progesterone; response to mechanical stimulus; negative regulation of transcription by RNA polymerase II; response to glucose; response to oxidative stress; transcription, DNA-templated; keratinocyte differentiation; response to calcium ion; negative regulation of cell division; regulation of cell population proliferation; positive regulation of apoptotic process; cell cycle; platelet-derived growth factor receptor signaling pathway; response to hydrogen peroxide; signal transduction
Sources:Amigo / QuickGO
Orthologs
Databases	NCBI: entry; OMA: entry
Species	Human	Mouse
Entrez	10628	56338
Ensembl	ENSG00000265972	ENSMUSG00000038393
UniProt	Q9H3M7	Q8BG60
RefSeq (mRNA)	NM_006472; NM_001313972	NM_001009935; NM_023719
RefSeq (protein)	NP_001300901; NP_006463	NP_001009935; NP_076208
Location (UCSC)	Chr 1: 145.99 – 146 Mb	Chr 3: 96.47 – 96.47 Mb
PubMed search
- Wikidata
View/Edit Human	View/Edit Mouse

Thioredoxin-interacting protein is a protein that in humans is encoded by the TXNIP gene.

== Interactions ==
TXNIP has been shown to interact with Thioredoxin and ZBTB32.

== Related gene problems ==
- TAR syndrome
- 1q21.1 deletion syndrome
- 1q21.1 duplication syndrome
