= CD160 =

Protein found in humans

Identifiers
- Aliases: CD160, BY55, NK1, NK28, CD160 molecule
- External IDs: OMIM: 604463; MGI: 1860383; GeneCards: CD160

Gene location (Human)
Chr.	Chromosome 1 (human)
Band	1q21.1	Start	145,719,471 bp
Band	1q21.1	End	145,739,288 bp

Gene location (Mouse)
Chr.	Chromosome 3 (mouse)
Band	3|3 F2.1	Start	96,706,079 bp
Band	3|3 F2.1	End	96,736,667 bp
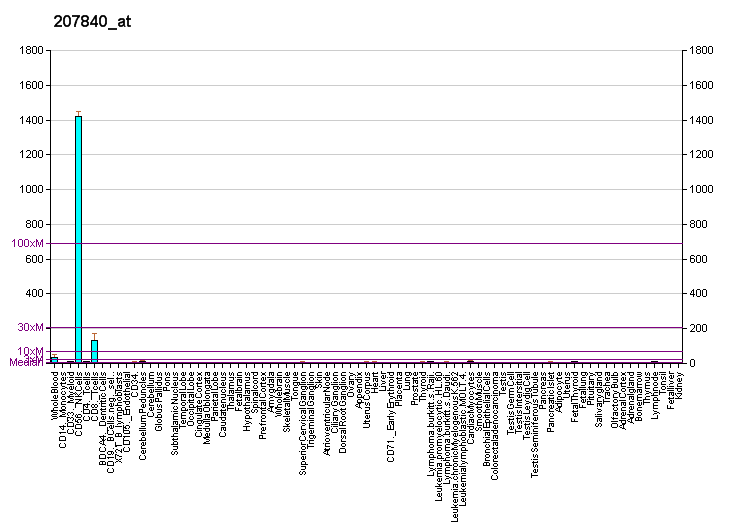
RNA expression pattern
Bgee	Human / Mouse (ortholog); Top expressed in: granulocyte; jejunal mucosa; blood; testicle; spleen; duodenum; stromal cell of endometrium; bone marrow; bone marrow cell; mononuclear cell / Top expressed in: secondary oocyte; zygote; primary oocyte; embryo; morula; embryo; ascending aorta; aortic valve; granulocyte; thymus; More reference expression data
BioGPS	More reference expression data
Gene ontology
Molecular function	signaling receptor binding; protein binding; MHC class I receptor activity; signaling receptor activity
Cellular component	anchored component of membrane; anchored component of plasma membrane; plasma membrane; membrane
Biological process	cellular defense response; cell surface receptor signaling pathway; cell population proliferation; defense response to Gram-negative bacterium; regulation of immune response; negative regulation of angiogenesis; positive regulation of endothelial cell apoptotic process
Sources:Amigo / QuickGO
Orthologs
Databases	NCBI: entry; OMA: entry
Species	Human	Mouse
Entrez	11126	54215
Ensembl	ENSG00000117281	ENSMUSG00000038304
UniProt	O95971	O88875
RefSeq (mRNA)	NM_007053	NM_001163496; NM_001163497; NM_018767
RefSeq (protein)	NP_008984	NP_001156968; NP_001156969; NP_061237
Location (UCSC)	Chr 1: 145.72 – 145.74 Mb	Chr 3: 96.71 – 96.74 Mb
PubMed search
- Wikidata
View/Edit Human	View/Edit Mouse

CD160 antigen is a protein that in humans is encoded by the CD160 gene.

CD160 is a 27 kDa glycoprotein which was initially identified with the monoclonal antibody BY55. Its expression is tightly associated with peripheral blood NK cells and CD8 T lymphocytes with cytolytic effector activity. The cDNA sequence of CD160 predicts a cysteine-rich, glycosylphosphatidylinositol-anchored protein of 181 amino acids with a single Ig-like domain weakly homologous to KIR2DL4 molecule. CD160 is expressed at the cell surface as a tightly disulfide-linked multimer. RNA blot analysis revealed CD160 mRNAs of 1.5 and 1.6 kb whose expression was highly restricted to circulating NK and T cells, spleen and small intestine. Within NK cells CD160 is expressed by CD56dimCD16+ cells whereas among circulating T cells its expression is mainly restricted to TCRgd bearing cells and to TCRab+CD8brightCD95+CD56+CD28-CD27-cells. In tissues, CD160 is expressed on all intestinal intraepithelial lymphocytes. CD160 shows a broad specificity for binding to both classical and nonclassical MHC class I molecules.

== Clinical significance ==
CD160 is a ligand for HVEM, and considered a proposed immune checkpoint inhibitor with anti-cancer activity along with anti- PD-1 antibodies. CD160 has also been proposed as a potential new target in cases of human pathological ocular and tumor neoangiogenesis that do not respond or become resistant to existing antiangiogenic drugs.

== Related gene problems ==
- TAR syndrome
- 1q21.1 deletion syndrome
- 1q21.1 duplication syndrome

== See also ==
- Cluster of differentiation
