= Btz domain =

Btz
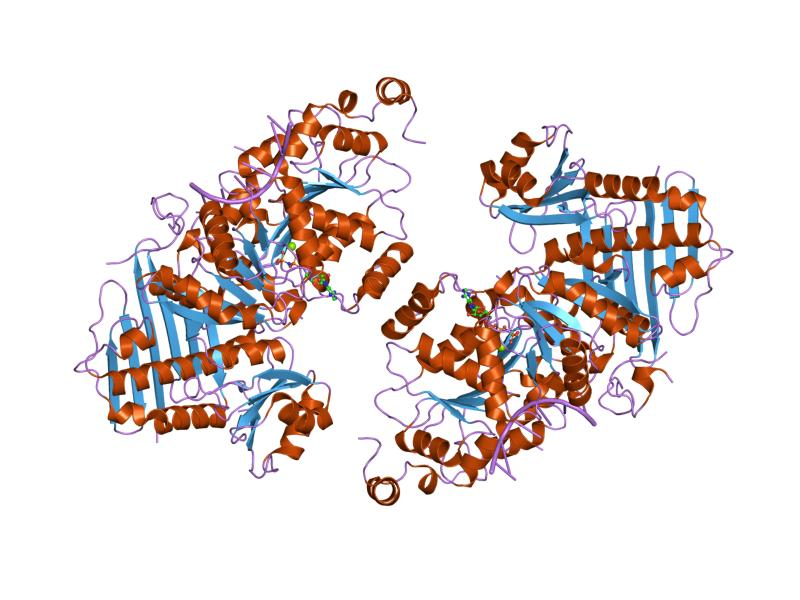
- Structure of the human exon junction complex with a trapped dead-box helicase bound to RNA

Identifiers
- Symbol: Btz
- Pfam: PF09405
- InterPro: IPR018545
Available protein structures:
- PDB: IPR018545 PF09405 (ECOD; PDBsum)
- AlphaFold: IPR018545; PF09405

In molecular biology, the Btz domain (CASC3/Barentsz eIF4AIII binding domain) is a protein domain found on CASC3 (cancer susceptibility candidate gene 3 protein) which is also known as Barentsz (Btz). CASC3 is a component of the EJC (exon junction complex) which is a complex that is involved in post-transcriptional regulation of mRNA in metazoa. The complex is formed by the association of four proteins (eIF4AIII, Barentsz, Mago, and Y14), mRNA, and ATP. This domain wraps around eIF4AIII and stacks against the 5' nucleotide.
