= Integrin alpha 10 =

Protein found in humans

ITGA10

Identifiers
- Aliases: ITGA10, PRO827, integrin subunit alpha 10
- External IDs: OMIM: 604042; MGI: 2153482; GeneCards: ITGA10
Available structures
PDB	Human UniProt search: PDBe RCSB
PDB	List of PDB id codes 1PT6, 1QC5, 1QCY, 2L8S, 2M32, 4A0Q

Gene location (Human)
Chr.	Chromosome 1 (human)
Band	1q21.1	Start	145,891,208 bp
Band	1q21.1	End	145,910,111 bp

Gene location (Mouse)
Chr.	Chromosome 3 (mouse)
Band	3|3 F2.1	Start	96,552,900 bp
Band	3|3 F2.1	End	96,571,835 bp
RNA expression pattern
Bgee	Human / Mouse (ortholog); Top expressed in: tibia; Descending thoracic aorta; cartilage tissue; ascending aorta; right coronary artery; Achilles tendon; gastric mucosa; periodontal fiber; left coronary artery; right lung / Top expressed in: facial skeleton; calvaria; Dermatocranium; membranous bone; mandible; sphenoid bone; fossa; maxilla; basisphenoid; body of femur; More reference expression data
BioGPS	n/a
Gene ontology
Molecular function	metal ion binding; collagen binding involved in cell-matrix adhesion; collagen binding
Cellular component	integrin complex; plasma membrane; membrane; integrin alpha10-beta1 complex; integral component of membrane
Biological process	cell-matrix adhesion; extracellular matrix organization; cell adhesion; integrin-mediated signaling pathway
Sources:Amigo / QuickGO
Orthologs
Databases	NCBI: entry; OMA: entry
Species	Human	Mouse
Entrez	8515	213119
Ensembl	ENSG00000143127	ENSMUSG00000090210
UniProt	O75578	n/a
RefSeq (mRNA)	NM_001303040; NM_001303041; NM_003637	NM_001081053; NM_001302471
RefSeq (protein)	NP_001289969; NP_001289970; NP_003628	n/a
Location (UCSC)	Chr 1: 145.89 – 145.91 Mb	Chr 3: 96.55 – 96.57 Mb
PubMed search
- Wikidata
View/Edit Human	View/Edit Mouse

Integrin alpha-10 also known as ITGA10 is a protein that in humans is encoded by the ITGA10 gene.

== Function ==
Integrins are integral membrane proteins composed of an alpha chain and a beta chain, and are known to participate in cell adhesion as well as cell-surface mediated signalling. The I-domain containing alpha 10 combines with the integrin beta 1 chain (ITGB1) to form a novel collagen type II-binding integrin expressed in cartilage tissue.

== Related gene problems ==
- TAR syndrome
- 1q21.1 deletion syndrome
- 1q21.1 duplication syndrome
