= ANKRD35 =

Protein-coding gene in humans

Identifiers
- Aliases: ANKRD35, ankyrin repeat domain 35
- External IDs: MGI: 2442590; GeneCards: ANKRD35

Gene location (Human)
Chr.	Chromosome 1 (human)
Band	1q21.1	Start	145,866,560 bp
Band	1q21.1	End	145,885,866 bp

Gene location (Mouse)
Chr.	Chromosome 3 (mouse)
Band	3|3 F2.1	Start	96,577,447 bp
Band	3|3 F2.1	End	96,598,348 bp
RNA expression pattern
Bgee	Human / Mouse (ortholog); Top expressed in: skin of arm; skin of leg; skin of abdomen; parotid gland; tendon of biceps brachii; nasal epithelium; mucosa of pharynx; human penis; gingival epithelium; nipple / Top expressed in: skin of external ear; lip; esophagus; transitional epithelium of urinary bladder; skin of back; lumbar subsegment of spinal cord; conjunctival fornix; epidermis; skin of abdomen; ascending aorta; More reference expression data
BioGPS	n/a
Orthologs
Databases	NCBI: entry; OMA: entry
Species	Human	Mouse
Entrez	148741	213121
Ensembl	ENSG00000198483	ENSMUSG00000038354
UniProt	Q8N283	n/a
RefSeq (mRNA)	NM_144698; NM_001280799	NM_001081139; NM_001356538; NM_001356539; NM_001356540
RefSeq (protein)	NP_001267728; NP_653299	n/a
Location (UCSC)	Chr 1: 145.87 – 145.89 Mb	Chr 3: 96.58 – 96.6 Mb
PubMed search
- Wikidata
View/Edit Human	View/Edit Mouse

Ankyrin repeat domain 35 also known as ANKRD35 is a protein which in humans is encoded by the ANKRD35 gene.

== Related gene problems ==
- TAR syndrome
- 1q21.1 deletion syndrome
- 1q21.1 duplication syndrome
