= POLR3C =

Protein-coding gene in humans

Identifiers
- Aliases: POLR3C, RPC3, RPC62, polymerase (RNA) III subunit C, RNA polymerase III subunit C, C82
- External IDs: OMIM: 617454; MGI: 1921664; GeneCards: POLR3C
Available structures
PDB	Ortholog search: PDBe RCSB
PDB	List of PDB id codes 2XUB, 2XV4, 5AFQ

Gene location (Human)
Chr.	Chromosome 1 (human)
Band	1q21.1	Start	145,824,088 bp
Band	1q21.1	End	145,844,402 bp

Gene location (Mouse)
Chr.	Chromosome 3 (mouse)
Band	3|3 F2.1	Start	96,618,806 bp
Band	3|3 F2.1	End	96,634,944 bp
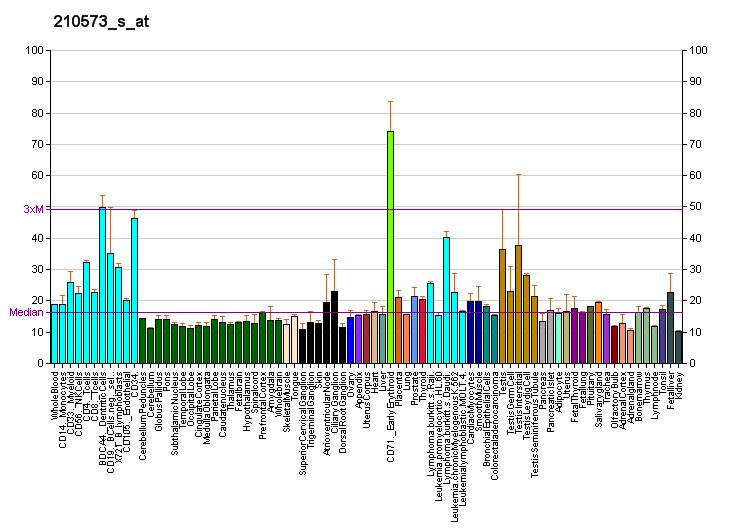

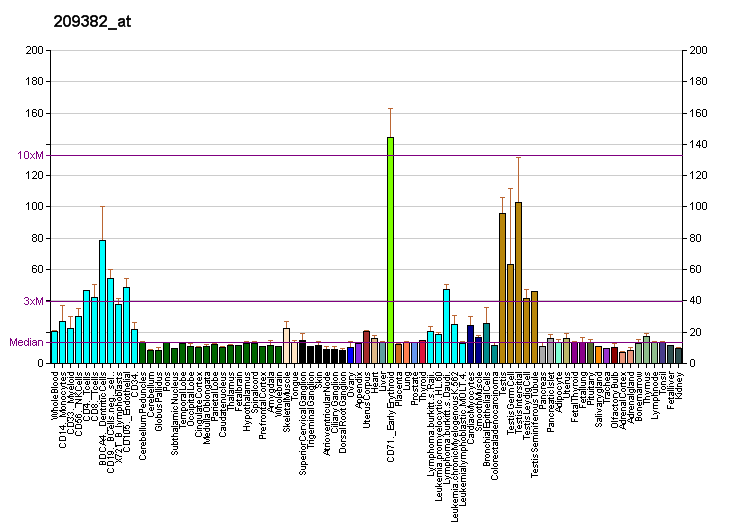
RNA expression pattern
Bgee	Human / Mouse (ortholog); Top expressed in: gonad; Achilles tendon; stromal cell of endometrium; monocyte; left testis; right testis; canal of the cervix; granulocyte; gallbladder; right ovary / Top expressed in: otic vesicle; intestinal villus; yolk sac; mesenteric lymph nodes; granulocyte; epiblast; seminiferous tubule; ventricular zone; jejunum; ileum; More reference expression data
BioGPS	More reference expression data
Gene ontology
Molecular function	DNA-directed 5'-3' RNA polymerase activity; DNA binding; protein binding; RNA polymerase III activity; single-stranded DNA binding
Cellular component	RNA polymerase III complex; cytosol; nucleoplasm; nucleus
Biological process	positive regulation of interferon-beta production; regulation of transcription by RNA polymerase III; defense response to virus; transcription, DNA-templated; positive regulation of innate immune response; immune system process; innate immune response; transcription by RNA polymerase III; positive regulation of type I interferon production
Sources:Amigo / QuickGO
Orthologs
Databases	NCBI: entry; OMA: entry
Species	Human	Mouse
Entrez	10623	74414
Ensembl	ENSG00000186141	ENSMUSG00000028099
UniProt	Q9BUI4	Q9D483
RefSeq (mRNA)	NM_001303456; NM_006468	NM_028925
RefSeq (protein)	NP_001290385; NP_006459	NP_083201
Location (UCSC)	Chr 1: 145.82 – 145.84 Mb	Chr 3: 96.62 – 96.63 Mb
PubMed search
- Wikidata
View/Edit Human	View/Edit Mouse

DNA-directed RNA polymerase III subunit RPC3 is an enzyme that in humans is encoded by the POLR3C gene.

== Interactions ==
POLR3C has been shown to interact with GTF3C4.

== Related gene problems ==
- TAR syndrome
- 1q21.1 deletion syndrome
- 1q21.1 duplication syndrome
