= POLR3GL =

Protein found in humans

Identifiers
- Aliases: POLR3GL, RPC32HOM, flj32422, polymerase (RNA) III subunit G like, RNA polymerase III subunit G like, RNA polymerase III subunit GL, SOFM
- External IDs: OMIM: 617457; MGI: 1917120; GeneCards: POLR3GL

Gene location (Human)
Chr.	Chromosome 1 (human)
Band	1q21.1	Start	145,964,690 bp
Band	1q21.1	End	145,978,848 bp

Gene location (Mouse)
Chr.	Chromosome 3 (mouse)
Band	3|3 F2.1	Start	96,485,188 bp
Band	3|3 F2.1	End	96,501,497 bp
RNA expression pattern
Bgee	Human / Mouse (ortholog); Top expressed in: gastrocnemius muscle; skeletal muscle tissue; right auricle of heart; granulocyte; left ventricle; muscle of thigh; Descending thoracic aorta; subcutaneous adipose tissue; apex of heart; gastric mucosa / Top expressed in: neural layer of retina; saccule; muscle of thigh; skeletal muscle tissue; temporal muscle; triceps brachii muscle; sternocleidomastoid muscle; gastrocnemius muscle; granulocyte; quadriceps femoris muscle; More reference expression data
BioGPS	n/a
Gene ontology
Molecular function	protein binding; DNA-directed 5'-3' RNA polymerase activity
Cellular component	RNA polymerase III complex; cytosol; nucleoplasm; nucleus
Biological process	transcription by RNA polymerase III; positive regulation of type I interferon production
Sources:Amigo / QuickGO
Orthologs
Databases	NCBI: entry; OMA: entry
Species	Human	Mouse
Entrez	84265	69870
Ensembl	ENSG00000121851	ENSMUSG00000028104
UniProt	Q9BT43	Q8R0C0
RefSeq (mRNA)	NM_032305; NM_001330685	NM_001293701; NM_027241
RefSeq (protein)	NP_001317614; NP_115681	NP_001280630; NP_081517
Location (UCSC)	Chr 1: 145.96 – 145.98 Mb	Chr 3: 96.49 – 96.5 Mb
PubMed search
- Wikidata
View/Edit Human	View/Edit Mouse

Polymerase (RNA) III (DNA directed) polypeptide G (32kD)-like also known as POLR3GL is a protein which in humans is encoded by the POLR3GL gene.

== Related gene problems ==
- TAR syndrome
- 1q21.1 deletion syndrome
- 1q21.1 duplication syndrome
