= FMO5 =

Protein-coding gene in humans

Identifiers
- Aliases: FMO5, flavin containing monooxygenase 5, flavin containing dimethylaniline monoxygenase 5, hBVMO1
- External IDs: OMIM: 603957; MGI: 1310004; GeneCards: FMO5
Enzyme activity
EC #	BRENDA	ExPASy	KEGG	MetaCyc
1.6.3.1	↗	↗	↗	↗
1.14.13.8	↗	↗	↗	↗

Gene location (Human)
Chr.	Chromosome 1 (human)
Band	1q21.1	Start	147,175,351 bp
Band	1q21.1	End	147,243,050 bp

Gene location (Mouse)
Chr.	Chromosome 3 (mouse)
Band	3|3 F2.2	Start	97,536,120 bp
Band	3|3 F2.2	End	97,562,598 bp
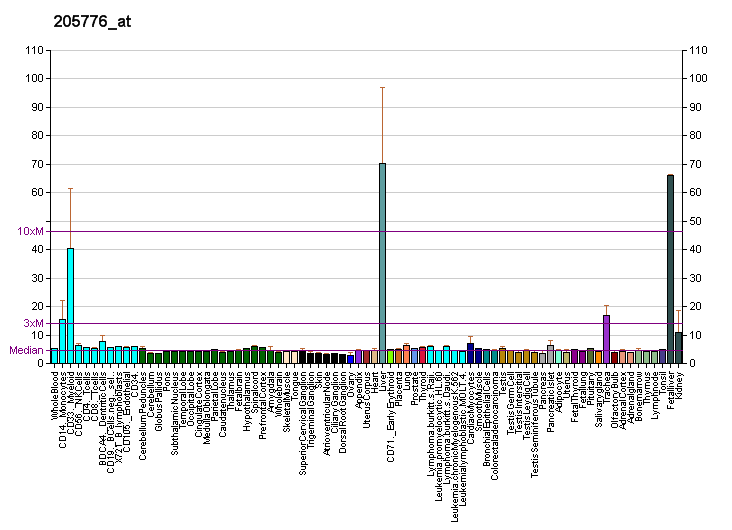

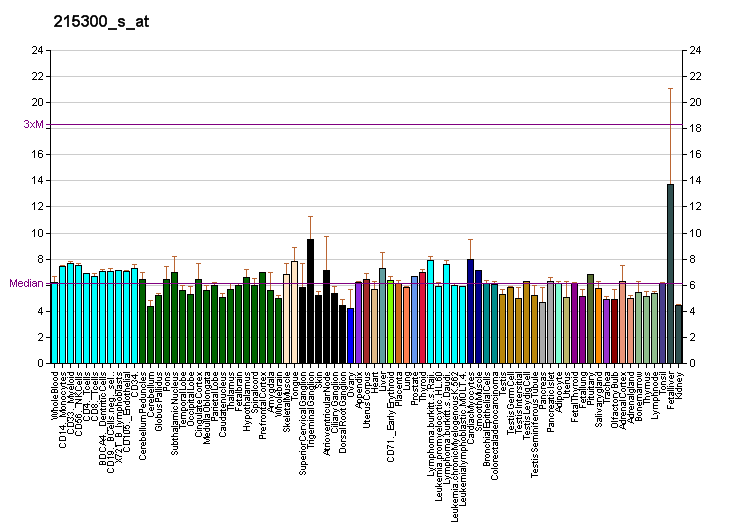
RNA expression pattern
Bgee	Human / Mouse (ortholog); Top expressed in: right lobe of liver; rectum; jejunal mucosa; buccal mucosa cell; duodenum; body of pancreas; body of stomach; mucosa of colon; mucosa of sigmoid colon; right lung / Top expressed in: transitional epithelium of urinary bladder; left lobe of liver; right kidney; jejunum; granulocyte; duodenum; olfactory epithelium; proximal tubule; ileum; conjunctival fornix; More reference expression data
BioGPS	More reference expression data
Gene ontology
Molecular function	oxidoreductase activity; N,N-dimethylaniline monooxygenase activity; NADP binding; flavin adenine dinucleotide binding; monooxygenase activity
Cellular component	organelle membrane; integral component of membrane; endoplasmic reticulum membrane; endoplasmic reticulum; membrane; intracellular membrane-bounded organelle; cytosol
Biological process	biological process
Sources:Amigo / QuickGO
Orthologs
Databases	NCBI: entry; OMA: entry
Species	Human	Mouse
Entrez	2330	14263
Ensembl	ENSG00000131781	ENSMUSG00000028088
UniProt	P49326	P97872
RefSeq (mRNA)	NM_001144829; NM_001144830; NM_001461	NM_001161763; NM_001161765; NM_010232; NM_001355119
RefSeq (protein)	NP_001138301; NP_001138302; NP_001452	NP_001155235; NP_001155237; NP_034362; NP_001342048
Location (UCSC)	Chr 1: 147.18 – 147.24 Mb	Chr 3: 97.54 – 97.56 Mb
PubMed search
- Wikidata
View/Edit Human	View/Edit Mouse

Dimethylaniline monooxygenase [N-oxide-forming] 5 is an enzyme in humans encoded by the FMO5 gene.

Metabolic N-oxidation of the diet-derived amino-trimethylamine (TMA) is mediated by flavin-containing monooxygenase and is subject to an inherited FMO3 polymorphism in man resulting in a small subpopulation with reduced TMA N-oxidation capacity resulting in fish odor syndrome Trimethylaminuria. Three forms of the enzyme, FMO1 found in fetal liver, FMO2 found in adult liver, and FMO3 are encoded by genes clustered in the 1q23-q25 region. Flavin-containing monooxygenases are NADPH-dependent flavoenzymes that catalyzes the oxidation of soft nucleophilic heteroatom centers in drugs, pesticides, and xenobiotics.

== Related gene problems ==
- 1q21.1 deletion syndrome
- 1q21.1 duplication syndrome
