= PRKAB2 =

Protein-coding gene in humans

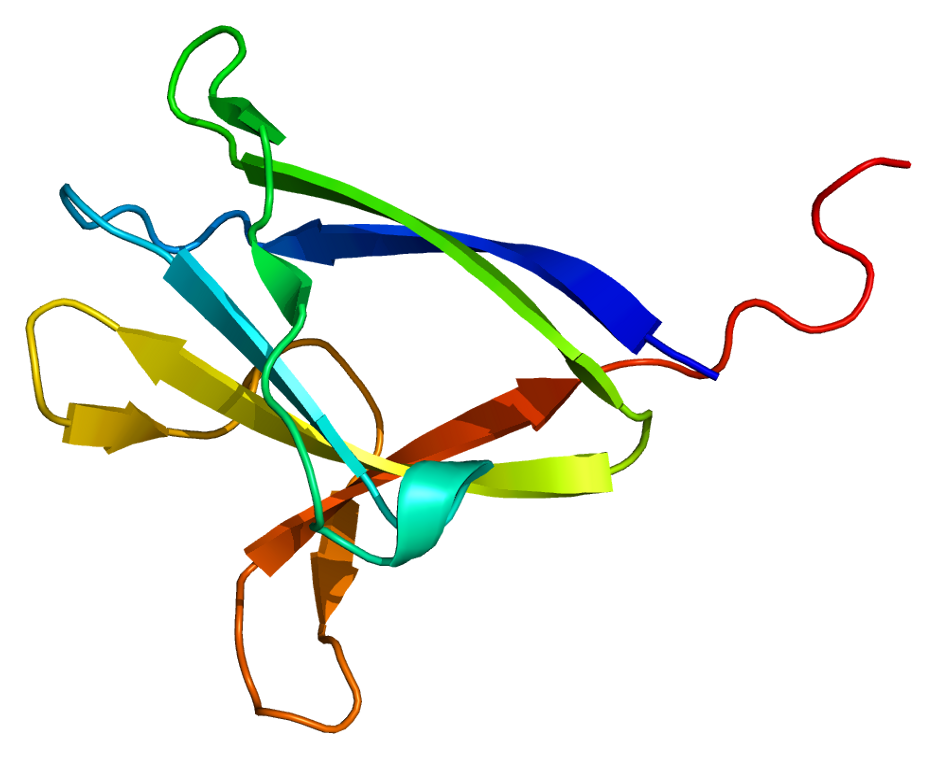

Identifiers
- Aliases: PRKAB2, protein kinase AMP-activated non-catalytic subunit beta 2
- External IDs: OMIM: 602741; MGI: 1336185; GeneCards: PRKAB2
Available structures
PDB	Ortholog search: PDBe RCSB
PDB	List of PDB id codes 2F15, 2V8Q, 2V92, 2V9J, 2Y8L, 2Y8Q, 2YA3, 4CFH, 4EAI, 4EAJ, 4RER, 4REW

Gene location (Human)
Chr.	Chromosome 1 (human)
Band	1q21.1	Start	147,155,106 bp
Band	1q21.1	End	147,172,550 bp

Gene location (Mouse)
Chr.	Chromosome 3 (mouse)
Band	3|3 F2.2	Start	97,565,509 bp
Band	3|3 F2.2	End	97,581,128 bp
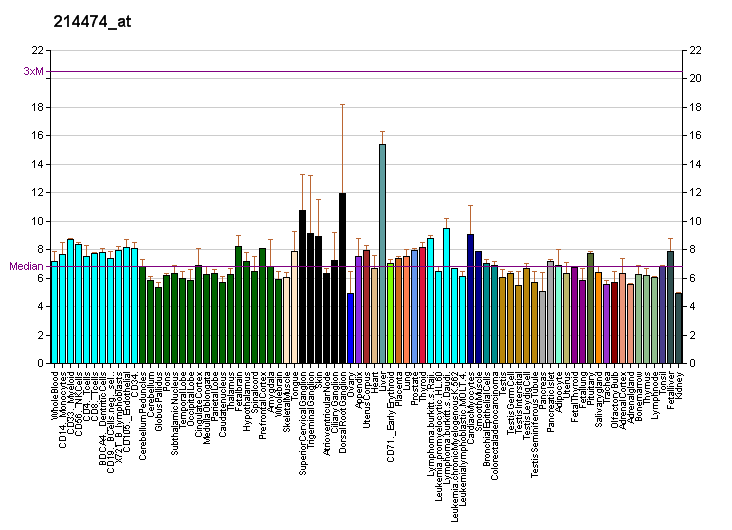
RNA expression pattern
Bgee	Human / Mouse (ortholog); Top expressed in: jejunal mucosa; biceps brachii; Skeletal muscle tissue of rectus abdominis; Skeletal muscle tissue of biceps brachii; gastrocnemius muscle; body of tongue; saphenous vein; muscle of thigh; buccal mucosa cell; tibial arteries / Top expressed in: epithelium of lens; knee joint; medial head of gastrocnemius muscle; quadriceps femoris muscle; facial motor nucleus; muscle of thigh; triceps brachii muscle; ascending aorta; tibialis anterior muscle; vastus lateralis muscle; More reference expression data
BioGPS	More reference expression data
Gene ontology
Molecular function	AMP-activated protein kinase activity; protein binding; identical protein binding; protein kinase binding
Cellular component	cytosol; nucleoplasm; nucleotide-activated protein kinase complex; nucleus; cytoplasm
Biological process	lipid metabolism; regulation of fatty acid biosynthetic process; fatty acid metabolic process; fatty acid biosynthetic process; macroautophagy; protein phosphorylation; signal transduction; regulation of catalytic activity; positive regulation of cold-induced thermogenesis; carnitine shuttle; regulation of macroautophagy; regulation of signal transduction by p53 class mediator
Sources:Amigo / QuickGO
Orthologs
Databases	NCBI: entry; OMA: entry
Species	Human	Mouse
Entrez	5565	108097
Ensembl	ENSG00000131791	ENSMUSG00000038205
UniProt	O43741	Q6PAM0
RefSeq (mRNA)	NM_005399	NM_182997
RefSeq (protein)	NP_005390	NP_892042
Location (UCSC)	Chr 1: 147.16 – 147.17 Mb	Chr 3: 97.57 – 97.58 Mb
PubMed search
- Wikidata
View/Edit Human	View/Edit Mouse

5'-AMP-activated protein kinase subunit beta-2 is an enzyme that in humans is encoded by the PRKAB2 gene.

The protein encoded by this gene is a regulatory subunit of the AMP-activated protein kinase (AMPK). AMPK is a heterotrimer consisting of an alpha catalytic subunit, and non-catalytic beta and gamma subunits. AMPK is an important energy-sensing enzyme that monitors cellular energy status. In response to cellular metabolic stresses, AMPK is activated, and thus phosphorylates and inactivates acetyl-CoA carboxylase (ACC) and beta-hydroxy beta-methylglutaryl-CoA reductase (HMGCR), key enzymes involved in regulating de novo biosynthesis of fatty acid and cholesterol. This subunit may be a positive regulator of AMPK activity. It is highly expressed in skeletal muscle and thus may have tissue-specific roles.

== Related gene problems ==
- 1q21.1 deletion syndrome
- 1q21.1 duplication syndrome

== Interactions ==
PRKAB2 has been shown to interact with PRKAG2 and PRKAG1.

Research on the genes CHD1L and PRKAB2 within lymphoblast cells lead to the conclusion that anomalies appear with the 1q21.1 deletion syndrome:

- CHD1L is an enzyme which is involved in untangling the chromatids and the DNA repair system. With 1q21.1 deletion syndrome a disturbance occurs, which leads to increased DNA breaks. The role of CHD1L is similar to that of helicase with the Werner syndrome
- PRKAB2 is involved in maintaining the energy level of cells. With 1q21.1-deletion syndrome this function was attenuated.
