= GPHRB =

Protein encoding gene in humans

Identifiers
- Aliases: GPHRB, GPHR, GPR89, GPR89C, SH120, UNQ192, G protein-coupled receptor 89B, GPR89B, Golgi pH regulator B
- External IDs: OMIM: 612806; MGI: 1914799; GeneCards: GPHRB

Gene location (Human)
Chr.	Chromosome 1 (human)
Band	1q21.2	Start	147,928,393 bp
Band	1q21.2	End	147,993,592 bp

Gene location (Mouse)
Chr.	Chromosome 3 (mouse)
Band	3|3 F2.1	Start	96,775,597 bp
Band	3|3 F2.1	End	96,812,662 bp
RNA expression pattern
Bgee	Human / Mouse (ortholog); Top expressed in: testicle; duodenum; corpus callosum; Achilles tendon; human kidney; body of pancreas; granulocyte; cerebellar cortex; cerebellar hemisphere; right lobe of liver / Top expressed in: spermatocyte; lacrimal gland; jejunum; otic vesicle; ileum; saccule; intestinal epithelium; interventricular septum; epithelium of small intestine; right lobe of liver; More reference expression data
BioGPS	n/a
Gene ontology
Molecular function	voltage-gated ion channel activity; voltage-gated anion channel activity
Cellular component	membrane; Golgi membrane; Golgi apparatus; integral component of membrane; Golgi cisterna membrane
Biological process	regulation of ion transmembrane transport; protein transport; ion transport; intracellular pH reduction; ion transmembrane transport; inorganic anion transport
Sources:Amigo / QuickGO
Orthologs
Databases	NCBI: entry; OMA: entry
Species	Human	Mouse
Entrez	51463	67549
Ensembl	ENSG00000188092	ENSMUSG00000028096
UniProt	P0CG08	Q8BS95
RefSeq (mRNA)	NM_001097616; NM_001350180; NM_001350181; NM_001350182; NM_001350183 NM_001350184; NM_016334	NM_026229
RefSeq (protein)	NP_001337109; NP_001337110; NP_001337111; NP_001337112; NP_001337113 NP_057418; NP_001091081; NP_001091082	NP_080505
Location (UCSC)	Chr 1: 147.93 – 147.99 Mb	Chr 3: 96.78 – 96.81 Mb
PubMed search
- Wikidata
View/Edit Human	View/Edit Mouse

Golgi pH regulator B is a protein that in humans is encoded by the GPHRB gene (previously GPR89B). Golgi pH regulator B is a golgi apparatus membrane protein that enables voltage-gated monoatomic anion channel activity and participates in intracellular pH reduction. There are multiple identical GPHR genes in humans. GPHRB denotes the most telomeric copy, while GPHRA denotes the most centromeric copy.

== Related gene problems ==
- 1q21.1 deletion syndrome
- 1q21.1 duplication syndrome
