= SLK =

slk or SLK may stand for:

- SLK (album), a 2014 album by Stam1na
- SLK (gene), a gene that in humans encodes the enzyme STE20-like serine/threonine-protein kinase
- SLK (group), a British grime music group
- Adirondack Regional Airport, US (IATA code)
- Mercedes-Benz SLK-Class, a sports car
- Saaremaa Laevakompanii (Saaremaa Shipping Company), former Estonian ferry operator
- SilkAir (ICAO code)
- .slk, filename extension for the SYmbolic LinK (SYLK) format
- Slovak language (ISO 639-2 code)
- Starostové pro Liberecký kraj (Mayors for Liberec Region), Czech political party
- Super League Kerala, a men's professional franchise football league based in Kerala, India
