= RNA-binding protein 8A =

Protein found in humans

RBM8A
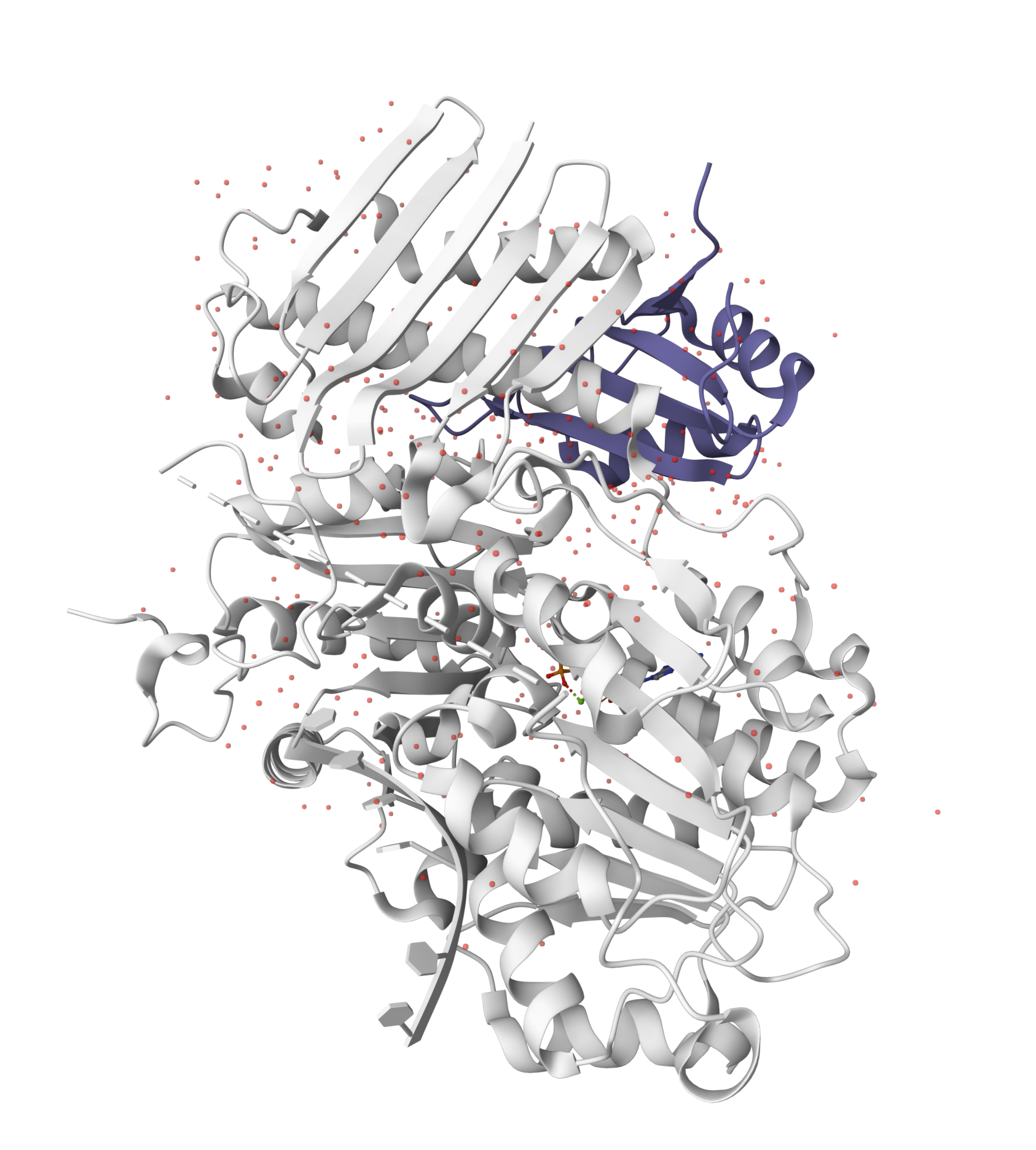

Identifiers
- Aliases: RBM8A, BOV-1A, BOV-1B, BOV-1C, C1DELq21.1, DEL1q21.1, MDS014, RBM8, RBM8B, TAR, Y14, ZNRP, ZRNP1, RNA binding motif protein 8A
- External IDs: OMIM: 605313; MGI: 1913129; GeneCards: RBM8A
Available structures
PDB	Ortholog search: PDBe RCSB
PDB	List of PDB id codes 1P27, 2HYI, 2J0Q, 2J0S, 2XB2, 3EX7

Gene location (Human)
Chr.	Chromosome 1 (human)
Band	1q21.1	Start	145,921,556 bp
Band	1q21.1	End	145,927,678 bp

Gene location (Mouse)
Chr.	Chromosome 3 (mouse)
Band	3|3 F2.1	Start	96,537,249 bp
Band	3|3 F2.1	End	96,541,107 bp
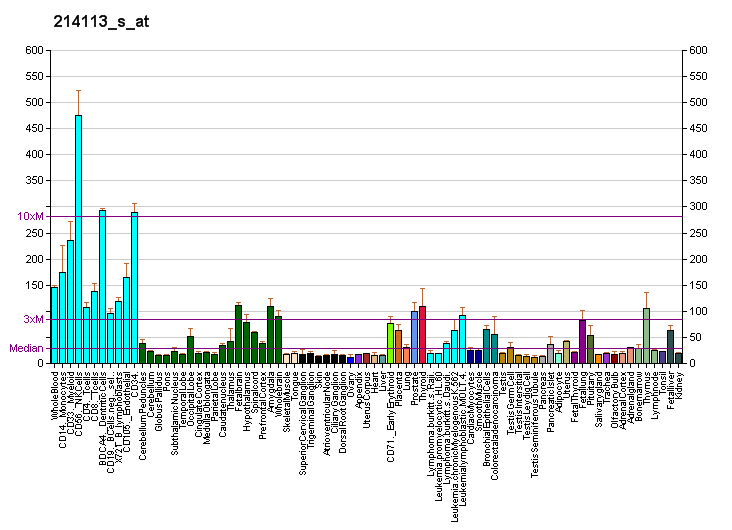

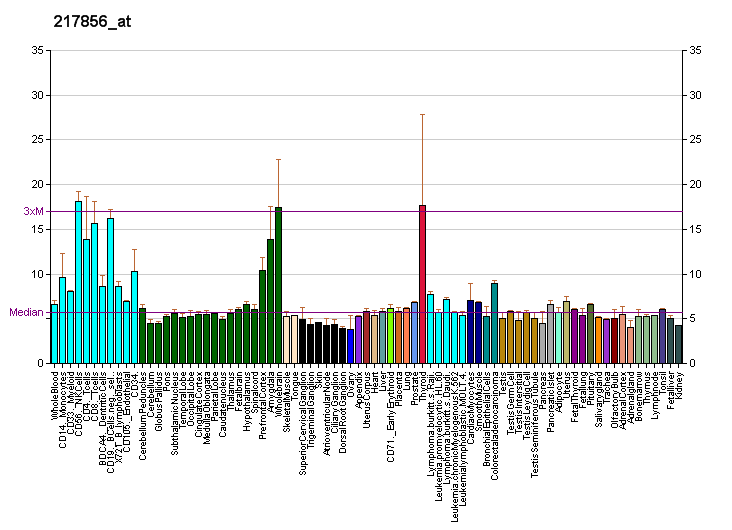

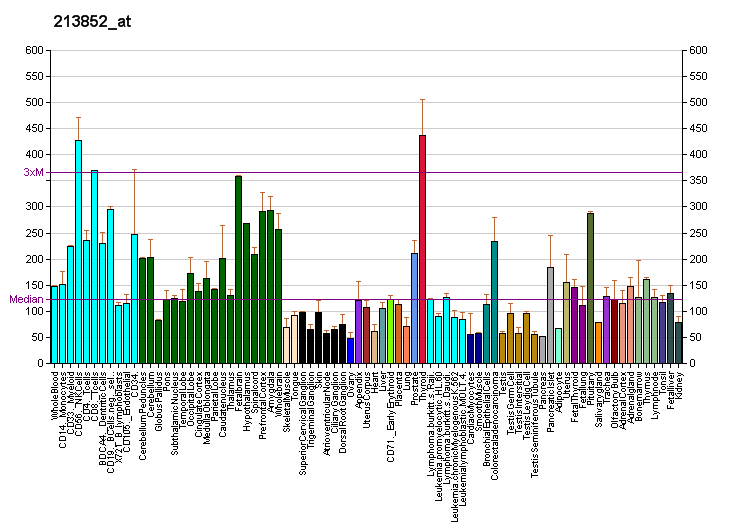
RNA expression pattern
Bgee	Human / Mouse (ortholog); Top expressed in: ganglionic eminence; ventricular zone; Achilles tendon; olfactory zone of nasal mucosa; gastrocnemius muscle; islet of Langerhans; skin of abdomen; monocyte; right testis; left testis / Top expressed in: embryo; embryo; interventricular septum; ventricular zone; blastocyst; yolk sac; morula; dentate gyrus of hippocampal formation granule cell; epiblast; neural layer of retina; More reference expression data
BioGPS	More reference expression data
Gene ontology
Molecular function	protein binding; nucleic acid binding; RNA binding; mRNA binding
Cellular component	cytosol; catalytic step 2 spliceosome; exon-exon junction complex; soma; dendrite; spliceosomal complex; nucleus; cytoplasm; nucleoplasm; nuclear speck; U2-type catalytic step 1 spliceosome
Biological process	mRNA splicing, via spliceosome; termination of RNA polymerase II transcription; mRNA transport; RNA processing; mRNA processing; regulation of alternative mRNA splicing, via spliceosome; mRNA export from nucleus; mRNA 3'-end processing; regulation of translation; RNA export from nucleus; nuclear-transcribed mRNA catabolic process, nonsense-mediated decay; RNA splicing; transport
Sources:Amigo / QuickGO
Orthologs
Databases	NCBI: entry; OMA: entry
Species	Human	Mouse
Entrez	9939	60365
Ensembl	ENSG00000265241	ENSMUSG00000038374
UniProt	Q9Y5S9	Q9CWZ3
RefSeq (mRNA)	NM_005105	NM_001102407; NM_025875
RefSeq (protein)	NP_005096	NP_001095877; NP_080151
Location (UCSC)	Chr 1: 145.92 – 145.93 Mb	Chr 3: 96.54 – 96.54 Mb
PubMed search
- Wikidata
View/Edit Human	View/Edit Mouse

RNA-binding protein 8A is a protein that in humans is encoded by the RBM8A gene.

This gene encodes a protein with a conserved RNA-binding motif. The protein is found predominantly in the nucleus, although it is also present in the cytoplasm. It is preferentially associated with mRNAs produced by splicing, including both nuclear mRNAs and newly exported cytoplasmic mRNAs. It is thought that the protein remains associated with spliced mRNAs as a tag to indicate where introns had been present, thus coupling pre- and post-mRNA splicing events. Previously, it was thought that two genes encode this protein, RBM8A and RBM8B; it is now thought that the RBM8B locus is a pseudogene. Two alternative start codons result in two forms of the protein, and this gene also uses multiple polyadenylation sites.

== Interactions ==
RBM8A has been shown to interact with IPO13, MAGOH and UPF3A.

== Related gene problems ==
- TAR syndrome
- 1q21.1 deletion syndrome
- 1q21.1 duplication syndrome
