= PEX11B =

Protein-coding gene in humans

Identifiers
- Aliases: PEX11B, PEX11-BETA, PEX14B, peroxisomal biogenesis factor 11 beta, PEX11beta
- External IDs: OMIM: 603867; MGI: 1338882; GeneCards: PEX11B

Gene location (Human)
Chr.	Chromosome 1 (human)
Band	1q21.1	Start	145,911,350 bp
Band	1q21.1	End	145,918,717 bp

Gene location (Mouse)
Chr.	Chromosome 3 (mouse)
Band	3|3 F2.1	Start	96,542,692 bp
Band	3|3 F2.1	End	96,552,682 bp
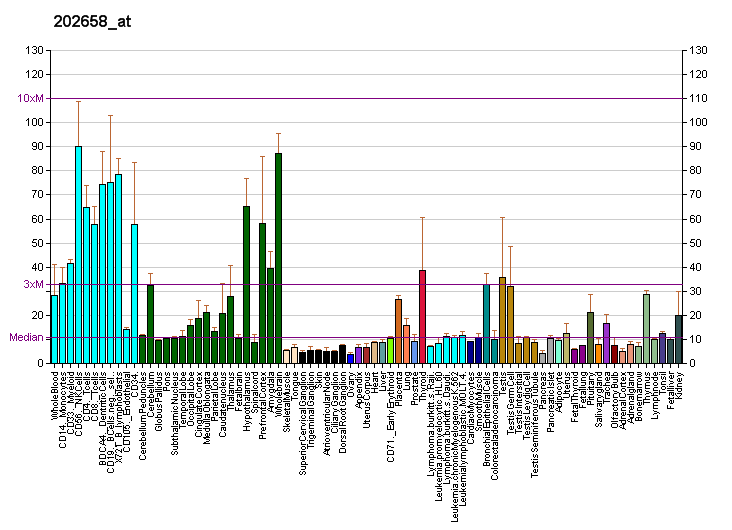
RNA expression pattern
Bgee	Human / Mouse (ortholog); Top expressed in: prefrontal cortex; Brodmann area 9; internal globus pallidus; palpebral conjunctiva; cingulate gyrus; right frontal lobe; nucleus accumbens; anterior cingulate cortex; mucosa of transverse colon; caudate nucleus / Top expressed in: spermatocyte; spermatid; right kidney; dentate gyrus of hippocampal formation granule cell; muscle of thigh; lip; entorhinal cortex; primary visual cortex; perirhinal cortex; CA3 field; More reference expression data
BioGPS	More reference expression data
Gene ontology
Molecular function	protein binding; protein homodimerization activity
Cellular component	integral component of membrane; peroxisomal membrane; peroxisome; extracellular exosome; membrane; integral component of peroxisomal membrane; mitochondrion; protein-containing complex
Biological process	regulation of peroxisome size; peroxisome organization; protein homooligomerization; signal transduction; peroxisome fission
Sources:Amigo / QuickGO
Orthologs
Databases	NCBI: entry; OMA: entry
Species	Human	Mouse
Entrez	8799	18632
Ensembl	ENSG00000131779	ENSMUSG00000028102
UniProt	O96011	Q9Z210
RefSeq (mRNA)	NM_001184795; NM_003846	NM_001162387; NM_001162388; NM_011069
RefSeq (protein)	NP_001171724; NP_003837	NP_001155859; NP_001155860; NP_035199
Location (UCSC)	Chr 1: 145.91 – 145.92 Mb	Chr 3: 96.54 – 96.55 Mb
PubMed search
- Wikidata
View/Edit Human	View/Edit Mouse

Peroxisomal membrane protein 11B is a protein that in humans is encoded by the PEX11B gene. It is involved in the regulation of peroxisome abundance.

== Interactions ==
PEX11B has been shown to interact with PEX19.

== Related gene problems ==
- 1q21.1 deletion syndrome
- 1q21.1 duplication syndrome
