= GPHRA =

Protein encoding gene in humans

Identifiers
- Aliases: GPHRA, GPHR, GPR89, SH120, UNQ192, G protein-coupled receptor 89A, GPR89A, Golgi pH regulator A
- External IDs: OMIM: 612821; MGI: 1914799; GeneCards: GPHRA

Gene location (Human)
Chr.	Chromosome 1 (human)
Band	1q21.1	Start	145,607,988 bp
Band	1q21.1	End	145,670,650 bp

Gene location (Mouse)
Chr.	Chromosome 3 (mouse)
Band	3|3 F2.1	Start	96,775,597 bp
Band	3|3 F2.1	End	96,812,662 bp
RNA expression pattern
Bgee	Human / Mouse (ortholog); Top expressed in: corpus callosum; duodenum; body of pancreas; testicle; endometrium; cerebellar cortex; cerebellar hemisphere; rectum; right hemisphere of cerebellum; Achilles tendon / Top expressed in: spermatocyte; lacrimal gland; jejunum; otic vesicle; ileum; saccule; intestinal epithelium; interventricular septum; epithelium of small intestine; right lobe of liver; More reference expression data
BioGPS	n/a
Gene ontology
Molecular function	voltage-gated anion channel activity; signal transducer activity; voltage-gated ion channel activity
Cellular component	integral component of membrane; Golgi cisterna membrane; Golgi-associated vesicle membrane; Golgi membrane; Golgi apparatus; membrane
Biological process	protein transport; positive regulation of I-kappaB kinase/NF-kappaB signaling; regulation of ion transmembrane transport; ion transport; intracellular pH reduction; signal transduction; regulation of anion transmembrane transport; transport
Sources:Amigo / QuickGO
Orthologs
Databases	NCBI: entry; OMA: entry
Species	Human	Mouse
Entrez	653519	67549
Ensembl	ENSG00000117262	ENSMUSG00000028096
UniProt	B7ZAQ6	Q8BS95
RefSeq (mRNA)	NM_001097612; NM_001097613	NM_026229
RefSeq (protein)	NP_001091081; NP_001091082; NP_001337109; NP_001337110; NP_001337111 NP_001337112; NP_001337113; NP_057418	NP_080505
Location (UCSC)	Chr 1: 145.61 – 145.67 Mb	Chr 3: 96.78 – 96.81 Mb
PubMed search
- Wikidata
View/Edit Human	View/Edit Mouse

Golgi pH regulator A is a protein that in humans is encoded by the GPHRA gene. Golgi pH regulator A is a golgi apparatus membrane protein that functions as a voltage-gated ion channel that allows the transfer of monoatomic anions such as iodide, chloride, bromide and fluoride. This is important for maintaining the acidic pH inside of the golgi. There are multiple identical GPHR genes in humans. GPHRA denotes the most centromeric copy, while GPHRB denotes the most telomeric copy.
