= AKAP10 =

Protein-coding gene in the species Homo sapiens

Identifiers
- Aliases: AKAP10, AKAP-10, D-AKAP-2, D-AKAP2, PRKA10, A-kinase anchoring protein 10
- External IDs: OMIM: 604694; MGI: 1890218; GeneCards: AKAP10
Available structures
PDB	Ortholog search: PDBe RCSB
PDB	List of PDB id codes 3IM4, 3TMH

Gene location (Mouse)
Chr.	Chromosome 11 (mouse)
Band	11|11 B2	Start	61,762,133 bp
Band	11|11 B2	End	61,821,078 bp
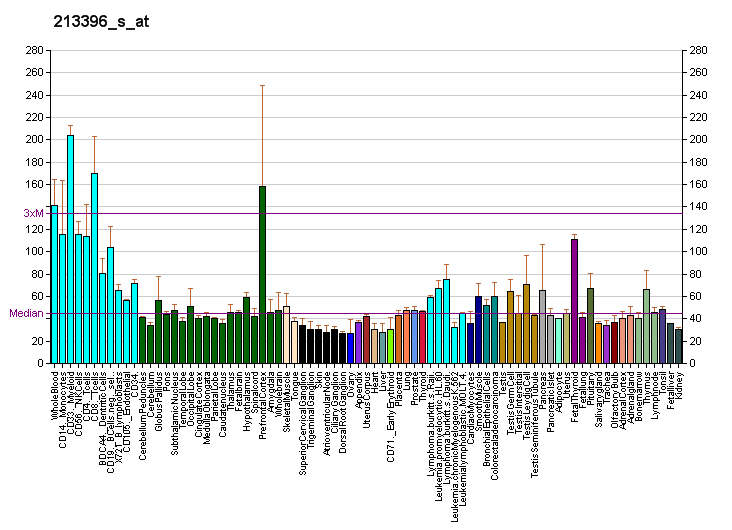

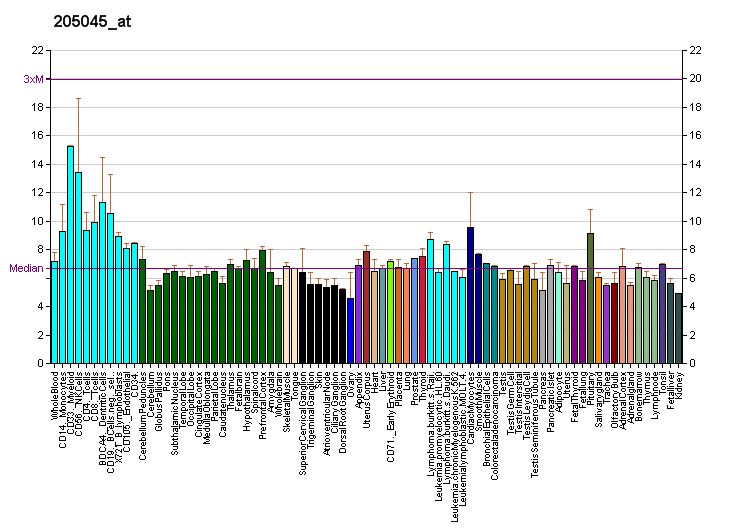
RNA expression pattern
Bgee	Human / Mouse (ortholog); Top expressed in: sural nerve; Achilles tendon; trabecular bone; monocyte; nipple; blood; optic nerve; bone marrow cell; visceral pleura; pancreatic ductal cell / Top expressed in: spermatid; endocardial cushion; zygote; secondary oocyte; renal corpuscle; medullary collecting duct; Rostral migratory stream; seminiferous tubule; spermatocyte; primary oocyte; More reference expression data
BioGPS	More reference expression data
Gene ontology
Molecular function	protein binding; protein kinase A binding
Cellular component	plasma membrane; membrane; mitochondrion; cytoplasm; cytosol; protein-containing complex
Biological process	blood coagulation; signal transduction; protein localization
Sources:Amigo / QuickGO
Orthologs
Databases	NCBI: entry
Species	Human	Mouse
Entrez	11216	56697
Ensembl	n/a	ENSMUSG00000047804
UniProt	O43572	O88845
RefSeq (mRNA)	NM_007202; NM_001330152	NM_019921
RefSeq (protein)	NP_001317081; NP_009133	NP_064305
Location (UCSC)	n/a	Chr 11: 61.76 – 61.82 Mb
PubMed search
- Wikidata
View/Edit Human	View/Edit Mouse

A kinase anchor protein 10, mitochondrial is an enzyme that in humans is encoded by the AKAP10 gene.

== Function ==
The A-kinase anchor proteins (AKAPs) are a group of structurally diverse proteins, which have the common function of binding to the regulatory subunit of protein kinase A (PKA) and confining the holoenzyme to discrete locations within the cell. This gene encodes a member of the AKAP family. The encoded protein interacts with both the type I and type II regulatory subunits of PKA; therefore, it is a dual-specific AKAP. This protein is highly enriched in mitochondria. It contains RGS (regulator of G protein signalling) domains, in addition to a PKA-RII subunit-binding domain. The mitochondrial localization and the presence of RGS domains may have important implications for the function of this protein in PKA and G protein signal transduction.

== Interactions ==
AKAP10 has been shown to interact with PDZK1 and PRKAR1A.
