= PDZK1IP1 =

Protein-coding gene in humans

Identifiers
- Aliases: PDZK1IP1, DD96, MAP17, SPAP, PDZK1 interacting protein 1
- External IDs: OMIM: 607178; MGI: 1914432; GeneCards: PDZK1IP1

Gene location (Human)
| Chr. | Chromosome 1 (human) |
| Band | 1p33 | Start | 47,183,582 bp |
| Band | 1p33 | End | 47,191,044 bp |

Gene location (Mouse)
| Chr. | Chromosome 4 (mouse) |
| Band | 4|4 D1 | Start | 114,945,905 bp |
| Band | 4|4 D1 | End | 114,951,096 bp |
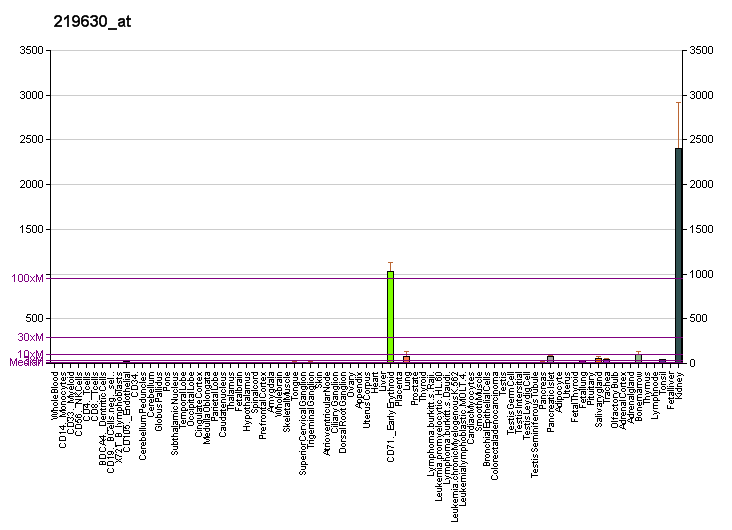
RNA expression pattern
| Bgee | Human / Mouse (ortholog); Top expressed in: metanephric glomerulus; minor salivary glands; kidney tubule; palpebral conjunctiva; skin of abdomen; gallbladder; human kidney; skin of leg; gums; body of pancreas / Top expressed in: right kidney; human kidney; proximal tubule; corneal stroma; esophagus; medullary collecting duct; lip; conjunctival fornix; gastrula; left colon; More reference expression data |
| BioGPS | More reference expression data |
Orthologs
| Databases | NCBI: entry; OMA: entry |
| Species | Human | Mouse |
| Entrez | 10158 | 67182 |
| Ensembl | ENSG00000162366 | ENSMUSG00000028716 |
| UniProt | Q13113 | Q9CQH0 |
| RefSeq (mRNA) | NM_005764 | NM_001164557; NM_001164558; NM_026018 |
| RefSeq (protein) | NP_005755 | NP_001158029; NP_001158030; NP_080294 |
| Location (UCSC) | Chr 1: 47.18 – 47.19 Mb | Chr 4: 114.95 – 114.95 Mb |
| PubMed search |
- Wikidata
| View/Edit Human | View/Edit Mouse |

PDZK1-interacting protein 1 is a protein that in humans is encoded by the PDZK1IP1 gene.

== Interactions ==
PDZK1IP1 has been shown to interact with PDZK1.
