= SLK (gene) =

Protein-coding gene in the species Homo sapiens

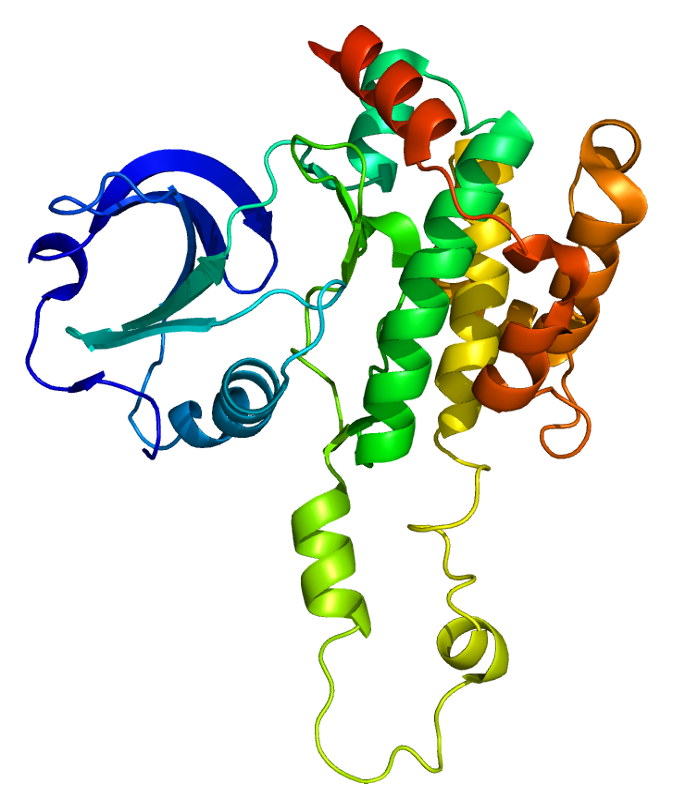

Identifiers
- Aliases: SLK, LOSK, STK2, bA16H23.1, se20-9, STE20 like kinase
- External IDs: OMIM: 616563; MGI: 103241; GeneCards: SLK
Available structures
PDB	Ortholog search: PDBe RCSB
PDB	List of PDB id codes 2J51, 2JFL, 2JFM, 2UV2, 4USF
Enzyme activity
EC #	BRENDA	ExPASy	KEGG	MetaCyc
2.7.11.1	↗	↗	↗	↗

Gene location (Human)
Chr.	Chromosome 10 (human)
Band	10q24.33-q25.1	Start	103,967,140 bp
Band	10q24.33-q25.1	End	104,029,233 bp

Gene location (Mouse)
Chr.	Chromosome 19 (mouse)
Band	19|19 C3- D1	Start	47,568,117 bp
Band	19|19 C3- D1	End	47,633,685 bp
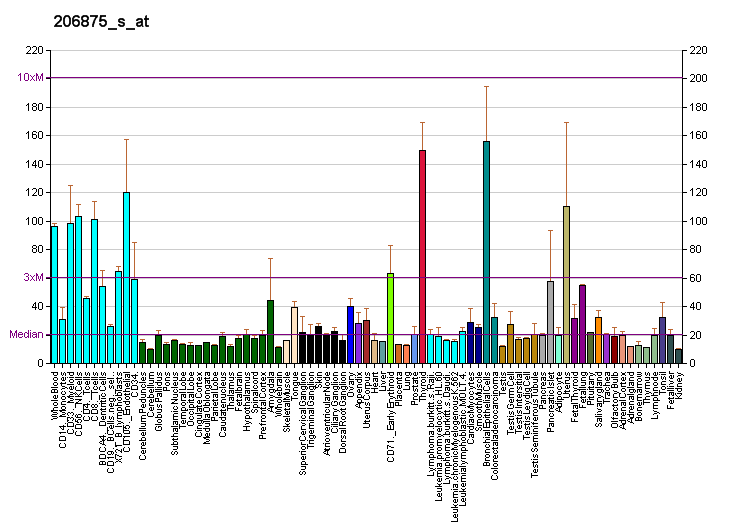

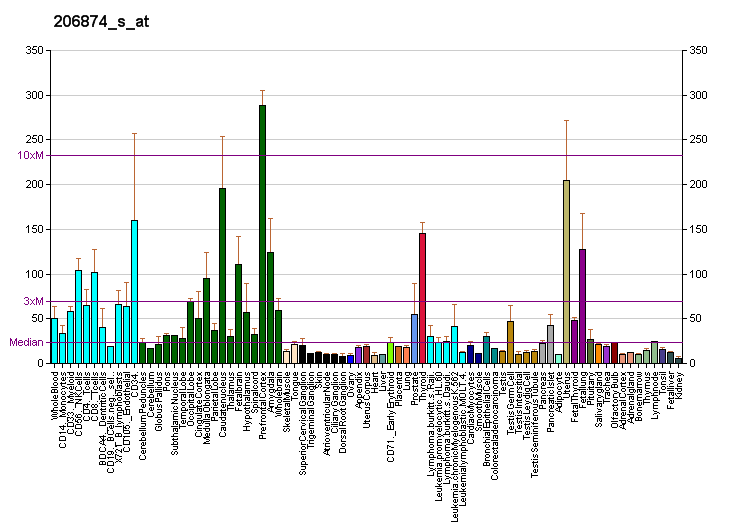
RNA expression pattern
Bgee	Human / Mouse (ortholog); Top expressed in: endothelial cell; amniotic fluid; glomerulus; metanephric glomerulus; Achilles tendon; Epithelium of choroid plexus; Brodmann area 23; oral cavity; gingival epithelium; mucosa of pharynx / Top expressed in: Ileal epithelium; genital tubercle; gastrula; aortic valve; tail of embryo; ciliary body; ascending aorta; Paneth cell; retinal pigment epithelium; saccule; More reference expression data
BioGPS	More reference expression data
Gene ontology
Molecular function	transferase activity; nucleotide binding; protein kinase activity; protein homodimerization activity; kinase activity; protein serine/threonine kinase activity; protein binding; identical protein binding; ATP binding; cadherin binding
Cellular component	extracellular exosome; cell leading edge; perinuclear region of cytoplasm; cytoplasm
Biological process	phosphorylation; protein phosphorylation; cytoplasmic microtubule organization; regulation of focal adhesion assembly; protein autophosphorylation; apoptotic process; regulation of cell migration; regulation of apoptotic process; regulation of mitotic cell cycle; signal transduction; stress-activated protein kinase signaling cascade; activation of protein kinase activity
Sources:Amigo / QuickGO
Orthologs
Databases	NCBI: entry; OMA: entry
Species	Human	Mouse
Entrez	9748	20874
Ensembl	ENSG00000065613	ENSMUSG00000025060
UniProt	Q9H2G2	O54988
RefSeq (mRNA)	NM_001304743; NM_014720	NM_001164639; NM_009289
RefSeq (protein)	NP_001291672; NP_055535	NP_001158111; NP_033315
Location (UCSC)	Chr 10: 103.97 – 104.03 Mb	Chr 19: 47.57 – 47.63 Mb
PubMed search
- Wikidata
View/Edit Human	View/Edit Mouse

STE20-like serine/threonine-protein kinase is an enzyme that in humans is encoded by the SLK gene.

== Interactions ==
SLK (gene) has been shown to interact with PDZK1.

SLK is a mammalian gene located on chromosome 10, it has also been cloned in rats. There is a whole family of STE20 like protein kinases, which has been divided into three categories. the most important p21-activated kinase (PAK), germinal center kinases (GCK) and Pleckstrin homology domain containing PAK (PHPAK). SLK gene plays an important role in development, termination and differentiation of cells and tissues. the main enzyme SLK gene produces is called Ste20-like kinases which was formerly known as Ste20-like serine/threonine protein kinase. the balanced expression of SLK gene is very essential for the correct development of body parts in all mammals. this enzyme is also involved in cell movement and cell cycle. The expression of SLK gene in germ line cell is regulated by phosphorylation of PLK1, which is another gene involved in mitosis. Ste20- like kinases manages the correct orientation of micro-tubules during inter-phase level of cell cycles. Underproduction of Ste20-like serine/threonine-protein kinases can result in micro-tubule fibers to detach from chromosomes. It also functions in activation/deactivation of apoptosis in cells, as well as organization and adhesion of cell to shape an appropriate organ.
