= RFPL3S =

Identifiers
- Aliases: RFPL3S, NCRNA00005, RFPL3-AS, RFPL3ANT, RFPL3AS, RFPL3-AS1, RFPL3 antisense
- External IDs: OMIM: 605971; GeneCards: RFPL3S

Gene location (Human)
Chr.	Chromosome 22 (human)
Band	22q12.3	Start	32,359,886 bp
Band	22q12.3	End	32,382,106 bp
RNA expression pattern
Bgee	Human / Mouse (ortholog); Top expressed in: sperm; left testis; right testis; testicle; gonad; secondary oocyte; cerebellar hemisphere; right hemisphere of cerebellum; ventricular zone; epithelium of colon / n/a; More reference expression data
BioGPS	n/a
Orthologs
Databases	NCBI: entry; OMA: entry
Species	Human	Mouse
Entrez	10737	n/a
Ensembl	ENSG00000205853	n/a
UniProt	n a	n/a
RefSeq (mRNA)	n/a	n/a
RefSeq (protein)	n/a	n/a
Location (UCSC)	Chr 22: 32.36 – 32.38 Mb	n/a
PubMed search		n/a
- Wikidata
View/Edit Human

RFPL3 antisense is a long non-coding RNA that in humans is encoded by the gene RFPL3S (previously RFPL3-AS). RFPL3S is antisense to the RFPL3 gene encoding a RING finger domain-containing protein. It may function in the post-transcriptional regulation of this gene.

== See also ==
- Long noncoding RNA
