= PEX11A =

Protein-coding gene in the species Homo sapiens

Identifiers
- Aliases: PEX11A, PEX11-ALPHA, PMP28, hsPEX11p, peroxisomal biogenesis factor 11 alpha, PEX11alpha
- External IDs: OMIM: 603866; MGI: 1338788; GeneCards: PEX11A

Gene location (Human)
Chr.	Chromosome 15 (human)
Band	15q26.1	Start	89,677,764 bp
Band	15q26.1	End	89,690,783 bp

Gene location (Mouse)
Chr.	Chromosome 7 (mouse)
Band	7|7 D2	Start	79,385,705 bp
Band	7|7 D2	End	79,392,879 bp
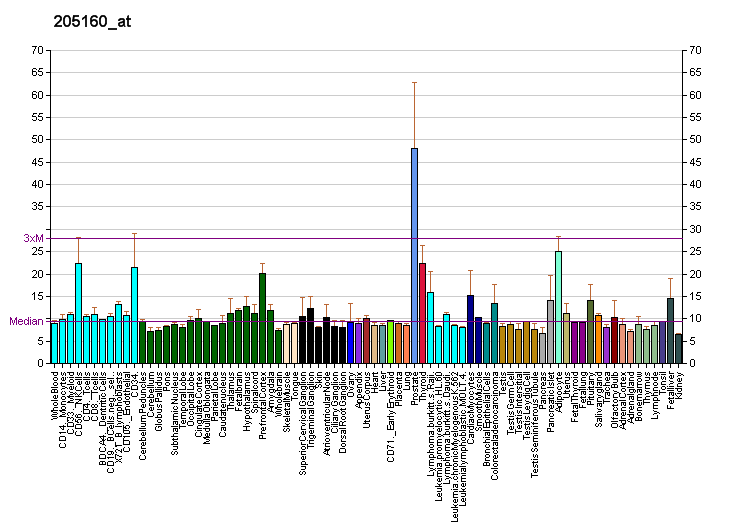

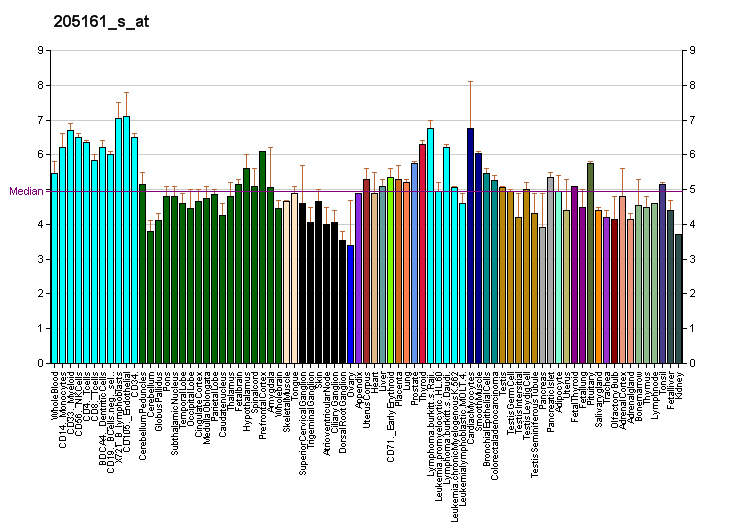
RNA expression pattern
Bgee	Human / Mouse (ortholog); Top expressed in: jejunal mucosa; germinal epithelium; mucosa of transverse colon; parotid gland; adipose tissue; lactiferous gland; right lobe of liver; mucosa of sigmoid colon; palpebral conjunctiva; subcutaneous adipose tissue / Top expressed in: salivary gland; lacrimal gland; brown adipose tissue; parotid gland; left lobe of liver; right kidney; submandibular gland; zygote; Paneth cell; proximal tubule; More reference expression data
BioGPS	More reference expression data
Gene ontology
Molecular function	protein binding; protein homodimerization activity
Cellular component	integral component of membrane; peroxisomal membrane; peroxisome; membrane; integral component of peroxisomal membrane; protein-containing complex
Biological process	regulation of peroxisome size; peroxisome membrane biogenesis; peroxisome organization; signal transduction; peroxisome fission; brown fat cell differentiation; regulation of lipid metabolic process
Sources:Amigo / QuickGO
Orthologs
Databases	NCBI: entry; OMA: entry
Species	Human	Mouse
Entrez	8800	18631
Ensembl	ENSG00000166821	ENSMUSG00000030545
UniProt	O75192	Q9Z211
RefSeq (mRNA)	NM_003847; NM_001271572; NM_001271573	NM_011068
RefSeq (protein)	NP_001258501; NP_001258502; NP_003838	NP_035198
Location (UCSC)	Chr 15: 89.68 – 89.69 Mb	Chr 7: 79.39 – 79.39 Mb
PubMed search
- Wikidata
View/Edit Human	View/Edit Mouse

Peroxisomal membrane protein 11A is a protein that in humans is encoded by the PEX11A gene.
