= PEX11G =

Protein-coding gene in the species Homo sapiens

Identifiers
- Aliases: PEX11G, peroxisomal biogenesis factor 11 gamma, PEX11gamma
- External IDs: OMIM: 607583; MGI: 1920905; GeneCards: PEX11G

Gene location (Human)
| Chr. | Chromosome 19 (human) |
| Band | 19p13.2 | Start | 7,476,875 bp |
| Band | 19p13.2 | End | 7,497,449 bp |

Gene location (Mouse)
| Chr. | Chromosome 8 (mouse) |
| Band | 8|8 A1.1 | Start | 3,457,105 bp |
| Band | 8|8 A1.1 | End | 3,467,680 bp |
RNA expression pattern
| Bgee | Human / Mouse (ortholog); Top expressed in: right testis; right lobe of liver; left testis; testicle; right adrenal gland; right adrenal cortex; left adrenal gland; left adrenal cortex; mucosa of transverse colon; sperm / Top expressed in: spermatocyte; spermatid; left lobe of liver; parotid gland; lacrimal gland; seminiferous tubule; right kidney; proximal tubule; seminal vesicula; duodenum; More reference expression data |
| BioGPS | n/a |
Gene ontology
| Molecular function | protein binding |
| Cellular component | peroxisome; intrinsic component of peroxisomal membrane; peroxisomal membrane; membrane; integral component of peroxisomal membrane; integral component of membrane; protein-containing complex |
| Biological process | regulation of peroxisome size; peroxisome fission |
Sources:Amigo / QuickGO
Orthologs
| Databases | NCBI: entry; OMA: entry |
| Species | Human | Mouse |
| Entrez | 92960 | 69129 |
| Ensembl | ENSG00000104883 | ENSMUSG00000069633 |
| UniProt | Q96HA9 | Q6P6M5 |
| RefSeq (mRNA) | NM_001270539; NM_001300881; NM_080662 | NM_026951 |
| RefSeq (protein) | NP_001257468; NP_001287810; NP_542393 | NP_081227; NP_001355305; NP_001355306; NP_001355307; NP_082870 |
| Location (UCSC) | Chr 19: 7.48 – 7.5 Mb | Chr 8: 3.46 – 3.47 Mb |
| PubMed search |
- Wikidata
| View/Edit Human | View/Edit Mouse |

PEX11G is a human gene that encodes the peroxisomal biogenesis factor 11 gamma for peroxisomes. It is located on chromosome 19.
