= RNF115 =

Protein-coding gene in the species Homo sapiens

Identifiers
- Aliases: RNF115, BCA2, ZNF364, ring finger protein 115, ZFP364, RABRING7
- External IDs: MGI: 1915095; GeneCards: RNF115
Enzyme activity
| EC # | BRENDA | ExPASy | KEGG | MetaCyc |
|---|---|---|---|---|
| 2.3.2.27 | ↗ | ↗ | ↗ | ↗ |

Gene location (Human)
| Chr. | Chromosome 1 (human) |
| Band | 1q21.1 | Start | 145,738,868 bp |
| Band | 1q21.1 | End | 145,824,095 bp |

Gene location (Mouse)
| Chr. | Chromosome 3 (mouse) |
| Band | 3|3 F2.1 | Start | 96,634,980 bp |
| Band | 3|3 F2.1 | End | 96,698,954 bp |
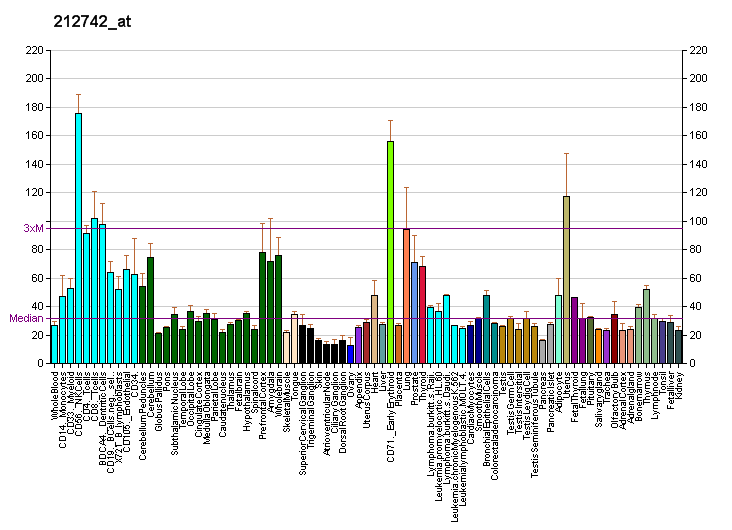
RNA expression pattern
| Bgee | Human / Mouse (ortholog); Top expressed in: glutes; right ventricle; Skeletal muscle tissue of rectus abdominis; triceps brachii muscle; Skeletal muscle tissue of biceps brachii; paraflocculus of cerebellum; tail of epididymis; myocardium; vastus lateralis muscle; myocardium of left ventricle / Top expressed in: soleus muscle; substantia nigra; vastus lateralis muscle; barrel cortex; intercostal muscle; motor neuron; facial motor nucleus; trigeminal ganglion; tibialis anterior muscle; conjunctival fornix; More reference expression data |
| BioGPS | More reference expression data |
Gene ontology
| Molecular function | protein binding; metal ion binding; ubiquitin protein ligase activity; ubiquitin-protein transferase activity; transferase activity |
| Cellular component | cytoplasm; cytosol |
| Biological process | protein K63-linked ubiquitination; protein K48-linked ubiquitination; ubiquitin-dependent protein catabolic process via the multivesicular body sorting pathway; negative regulation of epidermal growth factor receptor signaling pathway; protein ubiquitination; proteasome-mediated ubiquitin-dependent protein catabolic process; protein autoubiquitination; protein polyubiquitination |
Sources:Amigo / QuickGO
Orthologs
| Databases | NCBI: entry; OMA: entry |
| Species | Human | Mouse |
| Entrez | 27246 | 67845 |
| Ensembl | ENSG00000265491 | ENSMUSG00000028098 |
| UniProt | Q9Y4L5 | Q9D0C1 |
| RefSeq (mRNA) | NM_014455 | NM_026406 |
| RefSeq (protein) | NP_055270 | NP_080682 |
| Location (UCSC) | Chr 1: 145.74 – 145.82 Mb | Chr 3: 96.63 – 96.7 Mb |
| PubMed search |
- Wikidata
| View/Edit Human | View/Edit Mouse |

RING finger protein 115 is a protein, that in humans, is encoded by the RNF115 gene.
