= NUDT17 =

Protein-coding gene in humans

Identifiers
- Aliases: NUDT17, nudix hydrolase 17
- External IDs: MGI: 1925623; GeneCards: NUDT17
Enzyme activity
EC #	BRENDA	ExPASy	KEGG	MetaCyc
3.6.1.62	↗	↗	↗	↗

Gene location (Human)
Chr.	Chromosome 1 (human)
Band	1q21.1	Start	145,845,630 bp
Band	1q21.1	End	145,848,954 bp

Gene location (Mouse)
Chr.	Chromosome 3 (mouse)
Band	3|3 F2.1	Start	96,613,383 bp
Band	3|3 F2.1	End	96,615,878 bp
RNA expression pattern
Bgee	Human / Mouse (ortholog); Top expressed in: tendon of biceps brachii; testicle; buccal mucosa cell; cerebellar hemisphere; right hemisphere of cerebellum; granulocyte; gonad; apex of heart; ventricular zone; nucleus accumbens / Top expressed in: lip; skin of external ear; embryo; blastocyst; embryo; morula; facial motor nucleus; neural tube; dentate gyrus of hippocampal formation granule cell; mesenteric lymph nodes; More reference expression data
BioGPS	n/a
Gene ontology
Molecular function	hydrolase activity; metal ion binding; NADH pyrophosphatase activity
Cellular component	peroxisome; cytosol
Biological process	NADH metabolic process; NADP catabolic process; NAD catabolic process
Sources:Amigo / QuickGO
Orthologs
Databases	NCBI: entry; OMA: entry
Species	Human	Mouse
Entrez	200035	78373
Ensembl	ENSG00000186364	ENSMUSG00000028100
UniProt	P0C025	Q9CWD3
RefSeq (mRNA)	NM_001012758	NM_001162925; NM_030094
RefSeq (protein)	NP_001012776	NP_001156397; NP_084370
Location (UCSC)	Chr 1: 145.85 – 145.85 Mb	Chr 3: 96.61 – 96.62 Mb
PubMed search
- Wikidata
View/Edit Human	View/Edit Mouse

Nudix hydrolase 17 is a protein that in humans is encoded by the NUDT17 gene.
