= CHD1L =

Protein-coding gene in humans

Identifiers
- Aliases: CHD1L, ALC1, CHDL, chromodomain helicase DNA binding protein 1-like, chromodomain helicase DNA binding protein 1 like
- External IDs: OMIM: 613039; MGI: 1915308; GeneCards: CHD1L

Gene location (Human)
Chr.	Chromosome 1 (human)
Band	1q21.1	Start	147,242,654 bp
Band	1q21.1	End	147,295,765 bp

Gene location (Mouse)
Chr.	Chromosome 3 (mouse)
Band	3|3 F2.2	Start	97,468,058 bp
Band	3|3 F2.2	End	97,517,519 bp
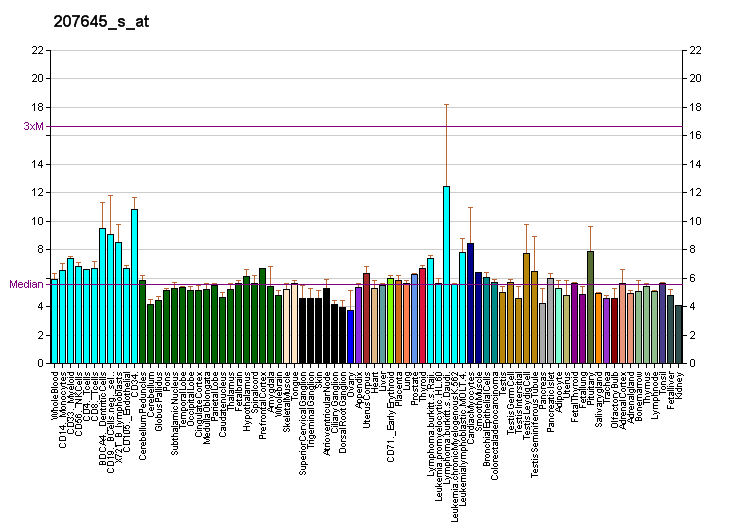

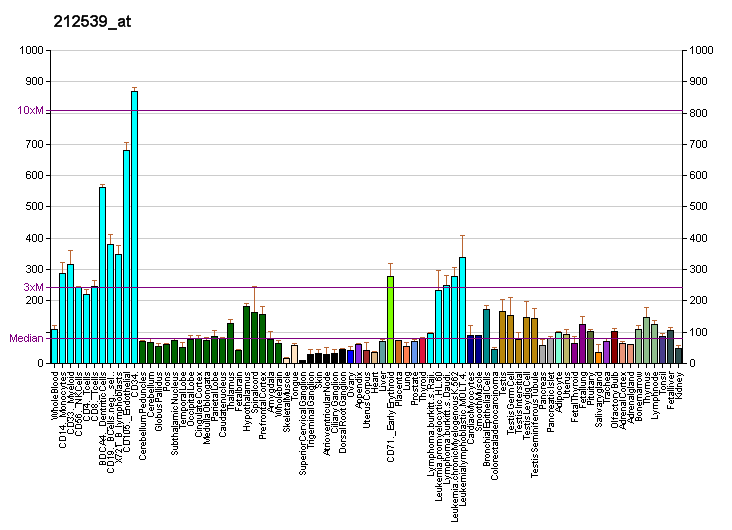
RNA expression pattern
Bgee	Human / Mouse (ortholog); Top expressed in: gonad; C1 segment; right hemisphere of cerebellum; right lobe of liver; anterior pituitary; ascending aorta; mucosa of transverse colon; granulocyte; spleen; Descending thoracic aorta / Top expressed in: saccule; otic placode; transitional epithelium of urinary bladder; seminiferous tubule; otic vesicle; spermatocyte; spermatid; primitive streak; Paneth cell; Gonadal ridge; More reference expression data
BioGPS	More reference expression data
Gene ontology
Molecular function	nucleotide binding; ATPase activity; protein binding; hydrolase activity; ATP binding; helicase activity; DNA helicase activity
Cellular component	plasma membrane; nucleus; nucleoplasm; cytosol
Biological process	global genome nucleotide-excision repair; nucleotide-excision repair, DNA incision; DNA repair; cellular response to DNA damage stimulus; nucleotide-excision repair, preincision complex stabilization; nucleotide-excision repair, preincision complex assembly; nucleotide-excision repair, DNA incision, 5'-to lesion; chromatin remodeling; DNA duplex unwinding; nucleotide-excision repair, DNA duplex unwinding; nucleotide-excision repair, DNA incision, 3'-to lesion
Sources:Amigo / QuickGO
Orthologs
Databases	NCBI: entry; OMA: entry
Species	Human	Mouse
Entrez	9557	68058
Ensembl	ENSG00000131778	ENSMUSG00000028089
UniProt	Q86WJ1	Q9CXF7
RefSeq (mRNA)	NM_001256336; NM_001256337; NM_001256338; NM_001348451; NM_001348452 NM_001348453; NM_001348454; NM_001348455; NM_001348456; NM_001348457; NM_001348458; NM_001348459; NM_001348460; NM_001348461; NM_001348462; NM_001348463; NM_001348464; NM_001348465; NM_001348466; NM_004284; NM_024568	NM_026539
RefSeq (protein)	NP_001243265; NP_001243266; NP_001243267; NP_004275; NP_078844 NP_001335380; NP_001335381; NP_001335382; NP_001335383; NP_001335384; NP_001335385; NP_001335386; NP_001335387; NP_001335388; NP_001335389; NP_001335390; NP_001335391; NP_001335392; NP_001335393; NP_001335394; NP_001335395	NP_080815
Location (UCSC)	Chr 1: 147.24 – 147.3 Mb	Chr 3: 97.47 – 97.52 Mb
PubMed search
- Wikidata
View/Edit Human	View/Edit Mouse

Chromodomain-helicase-DNA-binding protein 1-like (ALC1) is an enzyme that in humans is encoded by the CHD1L gene. It has been implicated in chromatin remodeling and DNA relaxation process required for DNA replication, repair and transcription. The ALC1 comprises ATPase domain and macro domain. On the basis of homology within the ATPase domain, ALC1 belongs to Snf2 family.

It has 897 amino acids and is approximately 101kDa in size.

== Function ==
=== In development ===
CHD1L, a DNA helicase, possesses chromatin remodeling activity and interacts with PARP1/PARylation in regulating pluripotency during developmental reprogramming. The CHD1L macro-domain interacts with the PAR moiety of PARylated-PARP1 to facilitate early-stage reprogramming and pluripotency in stem cells. It appears that CHD1L expression is vital for early events in embryonic development. CHD1L's role in embryonic development is related to its role as a transcriptional activator of several genes (Akt, METP2, TCF4) which lead to EMT (epithelial to mesenchymal transition) Notably, EMT is also implicated in tumor metastasis, further complicating CHD1L's role in both healthy and diseased cells.

=== In DNA repair ===
To allow the critical cellular process of DNA repair, the chromatin must be remodeled at sites of damage. CHD1L (ALC1) a chromatin remodeling protein, acts very early in DNA repair. Chromatin relaxation occurs rapidly at the site of a DNA damage. This process is initiated by PARP1 protein that starts to appear at DNA damage in less than a second, with half maximum accumulation within 1.6 seconds after the damage occurs. PARP1 then PARylates itself, with these PAR chains attracting the macro domain of CHD1L, relieving autoinhibition and allowing the N-terminal domains to interact with chromatin. The linker between the macro and N-terminal domains wraps around the histone, interacting with the acidic nucleosome patch via an R611 anchor. Next the chromatin remodeler CHD1L (ALC1) quickly attaches to the product of PARP1, and completes arrival at the DNA damage within 10 seconds of the damage. About half of the maximum chromatin relaxation, due to action of CHD1L (ALC1), occurs by 10 seconds. This then allows recruitment of the DNA repair enzyme MRE11, to initiate DNA repair, within 13 seconds. MRE11 is involved in homologous recombinational repair. CHD1L (ALC1) is also required for repair of UV-damaged chromatin through nucleotide excision repair.

== Related gene problems ==
- 1q21.1 deletion syndrome
- 1q21.1 duplication syndrome

With 1q21.1 deletion syndrome a disturbance occurs, which leads to increased DNA breaks. The role of CHD1L is similar to that of helicase with the Werner syndrome
