= MAGOH =

Protein-coding gene in humans

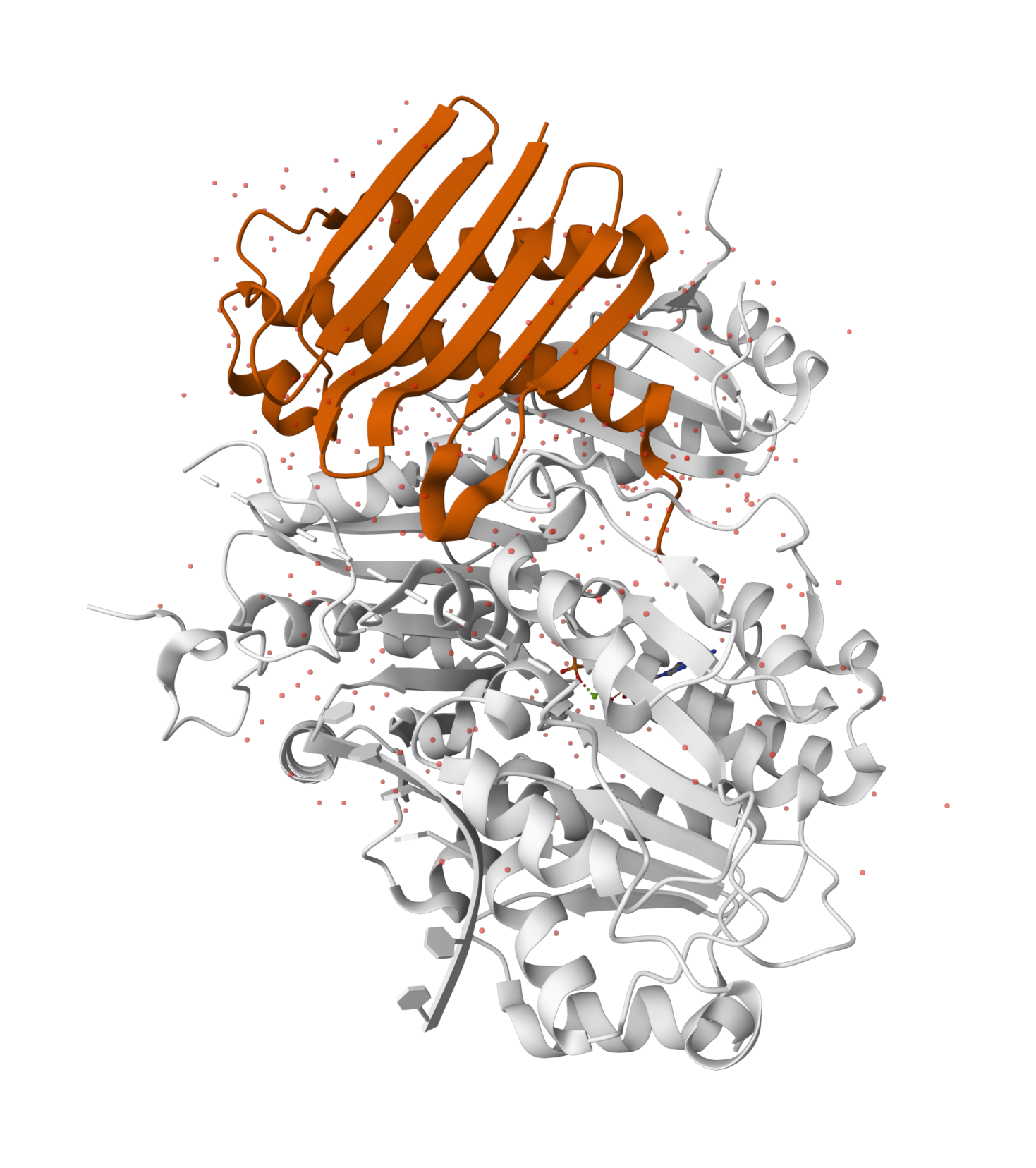

Identifiers
- Aliases: MAGOH, MAGOH1, MAGOHA, mago homolog, exon junction complex core component, mago homolog, exon junction complex subunit
- External IDs: OMIM: 602603; MGI: 1330312; GeneCards: MAGOH
Available structures
PDB	Ortholog search: PDBe RCSB
PDB	List of PDB id codes 1P27, 2HYI, 2J0Q, 2J0S, 2XB2, 3EX7

Gene location (Human)
Chr.	Chromosome 1 (human)
Band	1p32.3	Start	53,226,900 bp
Band	1p32.3	End	53,238,518 bp

Gene location (Mouse)
Chr.	Chromosome 4 (mouse)
Band	4 C7|4 50.18 cM	Start	107,736,952 bp
Band	4 C7|4 50.18 cM	End	107,744,621 bp
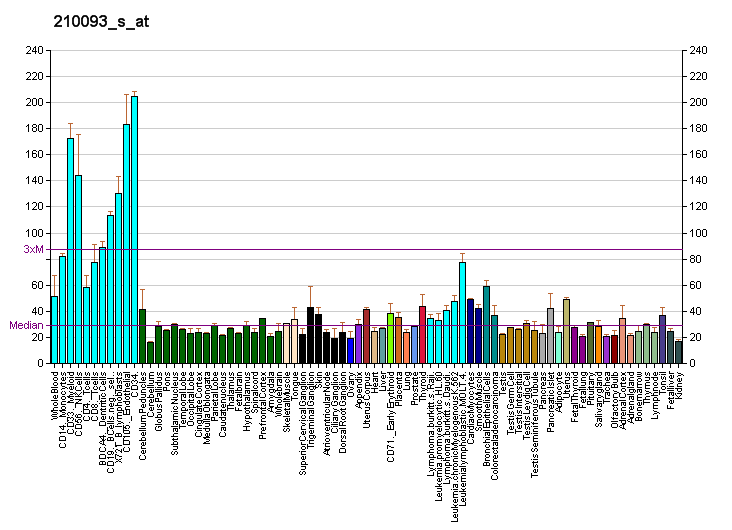

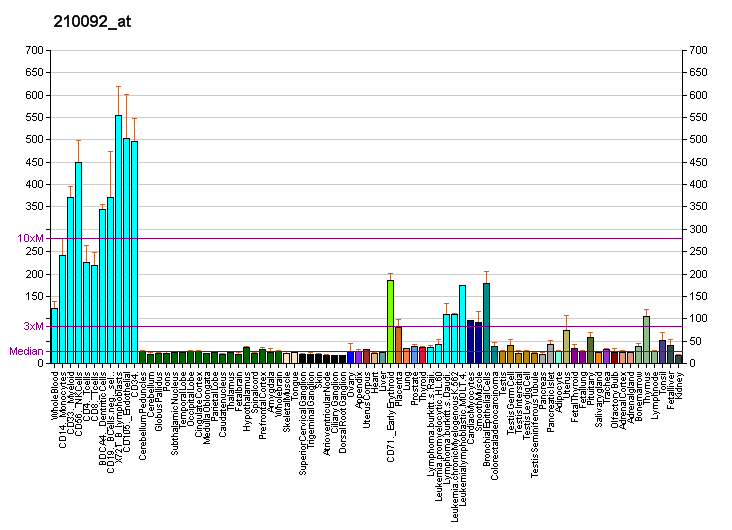
RNA expression pattern
Bgee	Human / Mouse (ortholog); Top expressed in: oocyte; secondary oocyte; monocyte; olfactory zone of nasal mucosa; rectum; mucosa of transverse colon; left lobe of thyroid gland; ventricular zone; body of uterus; granulocyte / Top expressed in: zygote; secondary oocyte; yolk sac; epiblast; embryo; ventricular zone; embryo; placenta; morula; primary oocyte; More reference expression data
BioGPS	More reference expression data
Gene ontology
Molecular function	protein binding; RNA binding
Cellular component	cytoplasm; nuclear speck; catalytic step 2 spliceosome; exon-exon junction complex; nucleoplasm; spliceosomal complex; nucleus
Biological process	mRNA splicing, via spliceosome; termination of RNA polymerase II transcription; mRNA transport; mRNA processing; regulation of alternative mRNA splicing, via spliceosome; mRNA export from nucleus; nuclear-transcribed mRNA catabolic process, nonsense-mediated decay; mRNA 3'-end processing; regulation of translation; RNA splicing; RNA export from nucleus; transport
Sources:Amigo / QuickGO
Orthologs
Databases	NCBI: entry; OMA: entry
Species	Human	Mouse
Entrez	4116	17149
Ensembl	ENSG00000162385	ENSMUSG00000028609
UniProt	P61326	P61327
RefSeq (mRNA)	NM_002370	NM_001282737
RefSeq (protein)	NP_002361	NP_001269666
Location (UCSC)	Chr 1: 53.23 – 53.24 Mb	Chr 4: 107.74 – 107.74 Mb
PubMed search
- Wikidata
View/Edit Human	View/Edit Mouse

Protein mago nashi homolog is a human protein encoded by the MAGOH gene. This gene encodes the mammalian homolog of the Drosophila mago nashi gene. In mammals, mRNA expression is not limited to the germplasm, but is ubiquitous in adult tissues and can be induced by serum stimulation of quiescent fibroblasts.

== In Drosophila ==
Drosophila flies produce unfit progeny when they have mutations in their mago nashi (Japanese: 孫なし, Hepburn: mago nashi; lit. 'grandchildless') gene. The progeny have defects in germplasm assembly and germline development.

== Interactions ==
MAGOH interacts with RBM8A and NXF1.

In Drosophila melanogaster, Mago Nashi and Tsunagi/Y14 are core components of the exon junction complex. They complex with novel zinc finger protein Ranshi, which is involved in oocyte differentiation.
