= TAR syndrome =

- Other names: Thrombocytopenia with absent radius syndrome
- Specialty: Medical genetics

TAR syndrome (thrombocytopenia with absent radius) is a rare genetic disorder that is characterized by the absence of the radius bone in the forearm and a dramatically reduced platelet count. It is associated with cardiac defects, dysmorphic features, and petechiae. It involves a 1q21 deletion with RMB8A variant on other allele.

== Signs and symptoms ==
- Presents with symptoms of thrombocytopenia, or a lowered platelet count, leading to bruising and potentially life-threatening hemorrhage.
- Absence of the radius bone in the forearm with preservation of the thumb.

Other common links between people with TAR syndrome include anemia, heart problems, kidney problems, knee joint problems, and frequently milk allergy. Different cases with leukemia in patients with TAR are described in.

== Genetics ==
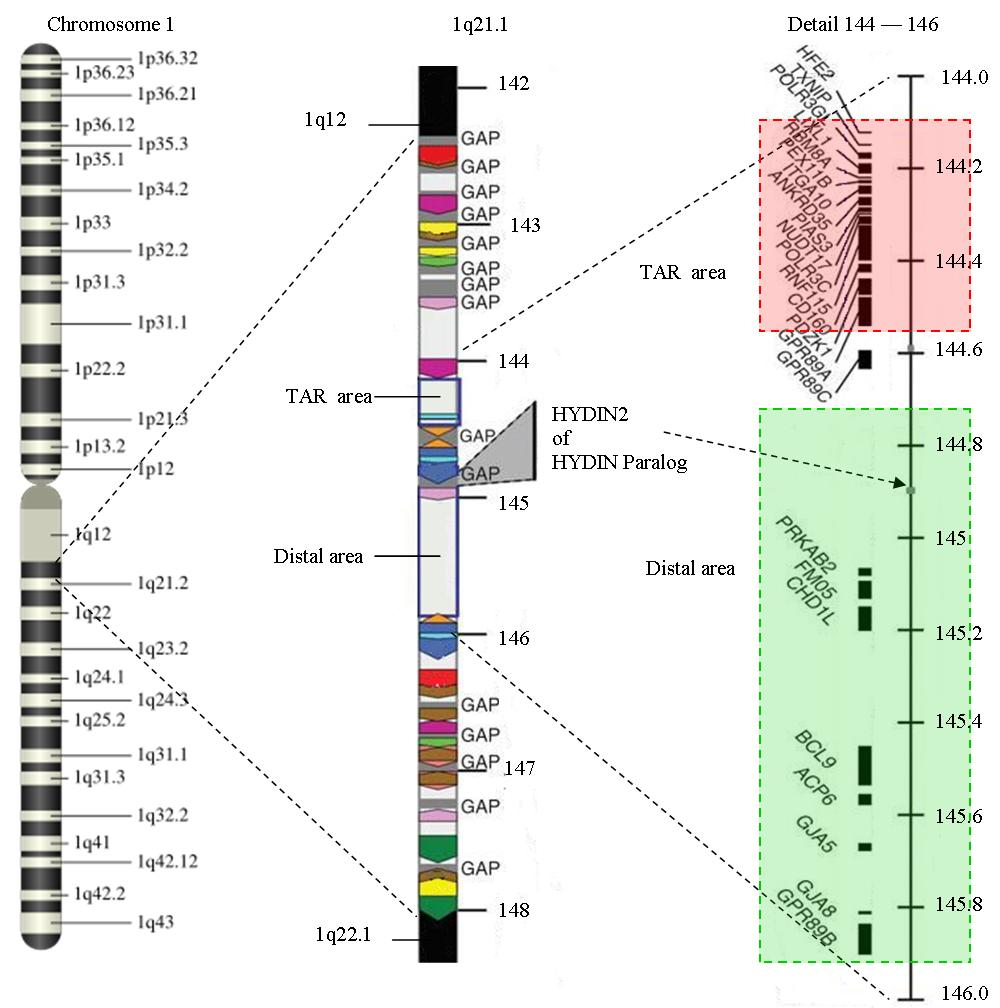
The cytogenetic location (pink box) of the RBM8A gene 0lon 1q21.1

This condition requires mutations in both chromosomes. The first mutation is inheritance of a 1q21.1 deletion and the second is in the remaining in the RBM8A gene.

Approximately 95% of TAR patients have one non-functional copy of the RBM8A gene.

== Treatment ==
Treatments range from platelet transfusions to surgery aimed at either centralizing the hand over the ulna to improve functionality of the hand or aimed at 'normalizing' the appearance of the arm, which is much shorter and 'clubbed'. There is some controversy surrounding the role of surgery.. The infant mortality rate has been curbed by new technology, including platelet transfusions, which can even be performed in utero. The critical period is the first and sometimes second year of life. For most people with TAR, platelet counts improve as they grow out of childhood.

== Epidemiology ==
The incidence is 0.42 per 100,000 live births.

== History ==
In 1929 Greenwald and Sherman described the first patient with TAR Syndrome. 40 years later Hall collected 40 cases and introduced the name "Thrombocytopenia with absent radius". In 1988 Hedberg published an article with 100 cases.
