= 1q21.1 deletion syndrome =

- Other names: Chromosome 1q21.1 microdeletion syndrome, 1q21.1 microdeletion, Monosomy 1q21.1, Del(1)(q21), 1q21.1 contiguous gene deletion, 1q21.1 deletion, Chromosome 1q21.1 deletion syndrome, Chromosome 1q21.1 deletion syndrome, 1.35-Mb.
- Specialty: Genetics.
- Symptoms: Delayed development, intellectual disability, physical abnormalities, neurological abnormalities and psychiatric problems.
- Usual onset: Infancy.
- Causes: Deletion of genetic material on the long arm (or q arm) of chromosome 1 at position 21.1.
- Diagnostic method: Chromosomal microarray analysis.
- Differential diagnosis: 22q11.2 microdeletion syndrome Coffin-Siris syndrome
- Frequency: 0.015% of the population.

1q21.1 deletion syndrome is a rare aberration of chromosome 1. A human cell has one pair of identical chromosomes on chromosome 1. With the 1q21.1 deletion syndrome, one chromosome of the pair is not complete, because a part of the sequence of the chromosome is missing. One chromosome has the normal length and the other is too short.

In 1q21.1 the initial '1' stands for chromosome 1, the 'q' stands for the long arm of the chromosome and '21.1' stands for the part of the long arm in which the deletion is situated.

The syndrome is a form of the 1q21.1 copy number variations, and it is a deletion in the distal area of the 1q21.1 part. The CNV leads to a very variable phenotype, and the manifestations in individuals are quite variable. Some people who have the syndrome can function in a normal way, while others have symptoms of intellectual impairment and various physical anomalies.

1q21.1 microdeletion is a very rare chromosomal condition. As of 2024, only 102 people with 1q21.1 deletion syndrome have been identified in medical research.

The recurrent 1q21.1 microdeletion was first identified in 2008 through a chromosomal microarray studies published in Nature Genetics and the New England Journal of Medicine.

== Signs and symptoms ==
Approximately 75% of all children with a 1q21.1 microdeletion exhibit delayed development, notably in motor skills such as sitting, standing, and walking. Individuals may have generalized mild learning difficulties; about 30% of those diagnosed with 1q21.1 deletion syndrome are affected.

Dysmorphic craniofacial traits are common, however, they are highly varied and thus difficult to identify. Microcephaly has been reported in 39% of those with the 1q21.1 deletion.

It is not clear whether the list of symptoms is complete. Very little information is known about the syndrome. The syndrome can have completely different effects on members of the same family.

Genitourinary abnormalities include vesicoureteral reflux, hydronephrosis, inguinal hernia, cryptorchidism, and genital malformations. There have been two reported cases of Mayer-Rokitansky-Kuster-Hauser syndrome alongside 1q21.1 deletion syndrome.

The majority of affected people have normal neurologic physical examinations, however hypotonia and tremors are quite common. Seizures affect roughly 16% of children and typically begin during infancy.

Possible psychiatric and behavioral abnormalities include autism spectrum disorder, attention deficit hyperactivity disorder, and mood disorders. Furthermore, distal 1q21.1 microdeletions have been found in 0.2%-0.6% of those with schizophrenia.

A common deletion is between 1.0-1.9Mb. Mefford states that the standard for a deletion is 1.35Mb.

Physical and clinical features reported in individuals with the distal 1q21.1 deletion are highly variable, ranging from no apparent findings to multiple congenital and developmental differences. Commonly affected systems include growth, neurological and motor function, heart development, vision, and behavior.

Growth and Development. Frequently described findings include failure to thrive, poor postnatal growth, short stature, microcephaly, and structural brain anomalies such as corpus callosum malformations. Eye findings may include strabismus, coloboma, and cataracts; opthalmologic involvement is reported in roughly one-third of individuals. Cardiac abnormalities such as septal defects, outflow-tract anomalies, and tetralogy of Fallot have been observed. Craniofacial findings such as high-arched palate have also been described.

Neurological and Behavioral. Neurological and motor features can include hypotonia (low muscle tone), motor delay, seizures and oral-motor dysfunction contributing to feeding or speech difficulties and excessive drooling (sialorrhea). Neurobehavioral traits described include attention deficit/hyperactivity disorder (ADHD), autistic characteristics, mood or anxiety disorders, sleep disturbance, self-injurious behavior, and, in some adults, psychotic disorders such as schizophrenia. Families report mood swings, including intense temper outbursts such as screaming or aggression and oppositional behaviour. However, presentations vary, and individuals may also exhibit positive and engaging behaviour.

Other findings. Musculoskeletal and genitourinary findings may include skeletal differences or urinary tract anomalies. Feeding and gastrointestinal issues such as dysphagia, gastroesophageal reflux, or gastroparesis may require individualized management, and G-tube feeding can be indicated when oral intake is insufficient. In one study of 68 subjects, dental deformities were reported in 10.3%. Hearing loss has also been described.

== Causes ==
1q21.1 deletion is autosomal dominant, with 18%-50% of deletions developing de novo and 50%-82% inherited from a parent.

The majority of affected individuals are missing a 1.35 million DNA base pair sequence, also written as 1.35 megabases (Mb), in the q21.1 region of chromosome 1, though the exact size of the deleted region differs. This deletion affects one of each cell's two copies of chromosome 1.

The symptoms caused by a 1q21.1 microdeletion are most likely due to the loss of many genes in this region. Researchers are attempting to determine which missing genes may contribute to 1q21.1 deletions' specific characteristics. Because some people with a 1q21.1 microdeletion have no clear associated traits, it is hypothesized that additional genetic and environmental factors influence the development of symptoms.

== Diagnosis ==
The recurring distal 1.35-Mb heterozygous deletion within the position of 145–146.35 Mb in the reference genome confirms the diagnosis of 1q21.1 deletion. The copy number of sequences can be determined using chromosome microarrays or targeted deletion analysis by fluorescence in situ hybridization.

=== Differential diagnosis ===
22q11.2 microdeletion shares several characteristics with 1q21.1 microdeletion including developmental delays, learning disabilities, intellectual disability, and behavioral deviations. Those with recurrent 1q21.1 microdeletion, on the other hand, do not have the distinctive facial traits seen in the 22q11.2 microdeletion syndrome.

== Management ==
Several examinations should be performed to determine the level of disability and the needs of a person with the 1q21.1 deletion. Because of the vast range of symptoms, ophthalmologic, cardiac, developmental, neurological, and psychiatric evaluations may be helpful in identifying the manifestations of 1q21.1 deletion. Different developmental abnormalities of the skull and genitourinary system can be identified with brain imaging and renal ultrasounds. Consultations with a medical geneticist or genetic counselor can aid in determining the cause of 1q21.1 deletion.

Because of the variability in 1q21.1 deletion, management is dependent on specific symptoms. Occupational and physical therapy, as well as special learning programs, may be used to manage symptoms. Feeding therapy may be used to address poor growth, with a low threshold for feeding evaluation and/or radiographic swallowing study when there are clinical signs or symptoms of dysphagia.

== Epidemiology ==
Nonallelic homologous recombination (NAHR), mediated by low copy repeats (LCRs), is a well-known mechanism of copy number alterations in an array of genomic diseases. Individually, these conditions are uncommon, yet collectively, they impact a significant portion of the population. 1q21.1 deletions are estimated to occur in about 0.015% of the population. However, these CNVs are incompletely penetrant, therefore it is likely that the actual prevalence in the general population is greater than the current predictions.

== Research ==
Statistical research showed that schizophrenia is more common in combination with 1q21.1 deletion syndrome. On the other side, autism is significantly more common with 1q21.1 duplication syndrome. Further research confirmed that the odds on a relation between schizophrenia and deletions at 1q21.1, 3q29, 15q13.3, 22q11.21 en Neurexin 1 (NRXN1) and duplications at 16p11.2 are at 7.5% or higher.

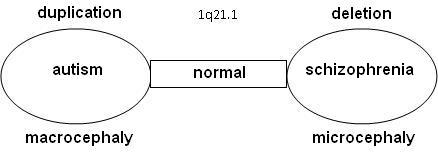
Observed relation within 1q21.1

Common variations in the BCL9 gene, which is in the distal area, confer risk of schizophrenia and may also be associated with bipolar disorder and major depressive disorder.

Research is done on 10–12 genes on 1q21.1 that produce DUF1220-locations. DUF1220 is an unknown protein, which is active in the neurons of the brain near the neocortex. Based on research on apes and other mammals, it is assumed that DUF1220 is related to cognitive development (man: 212 locations; chimpanzee: 37 locations; monkey: 30 locations; mouse: 1 location). It appears that the DUF1220-locations on 1q21.1 are in areas that are related to the size and the development of the brain. The aspect of the size and development of the brain is related to autism (macrocephaly) and schizophrenia (microcephaly). It has been proposed that a deletion or duplication of a gene that produces DUF1220-areas might cause growth and development disorders in the brain

Another relation between macrocephaly with duplications and microcephaly with deletions has been seen in research on the HYDIN Paralog or HYDIN2. This part of 1q21.1 is involved in the development of the brain. It is assumed to be a dosage-sensitive gene. When this gene is not available in the 1q21.1 area, it leads to microcephaly. HYDIN2 is a recent duplication (found only in humans) of the HYDIN gene found on 16q22.2. Research on the genes CHD1L and PRKAB2 within lymphoblast cells lead to the conclusion that anomalies appear with the 1q21.1-deletion syndrome:

- CHD1L is an enzyme which is involved in untangling the chromatids and the DNA repair system. With 1q21.1 deletion syndrome a disturbance occurs, which leads to increased DNA breaks. The role of CHD1L is similar to that of helicase with the Werner syndrome
- PRKAB2 is involved in maintaining the energy level of cells. With 1q21.1-deletion syndrome this function was attenuated.

GJA5 has been identified as the gene that is responsible for the phenotypes observed with congenital heart diseases on the 1q21.1 location. In case of a duplication of GJA5 tetralogy of Fallot is more common. In case of a deletion other congenital heart diseases than tetralogy of Fallot are more common.
