= 1q21.1 duplication syndrome =

- Other names: 1q21.1 microduplication, 1q21.1 duplication
- 1q21.1 duplication syndrome is inherited in an autosomal dominant manner
- Specialty: Medical genetics

1q21.1 duplication syndrome, also known as 1q21.1 microduplication, is an uncommon copy number variant associated with several congenital abnormalities, including developmental delay, dysmorphic traits, autism spectrum disorder, and congenital cardiac defects. Common facial features include frontal bossing, hypertelorism, and macrocephaly. Around 18 and 29% of patients with 1q21.1 microduplications have congenital cardiac abnormalities. 1q21.1 duplication syndrome is caused by microduplications of the BP3-BP4 region. 18-50% are de novo deletions and 50-82% inherited from parents. The 1q21.1 area, one of the largest regions in the human genome, is highly susceptible to copy number variation due to its frequent low-copy duplications. Whole exome sequencing and quantitative polymerase chain reaction can provide a precise molecular diagnosis for children with 1q21.1 microduplication syndrome.

== Signs and symptoms ==
Clinical signs of 1q21.1 recurrent microdeletion can vary greatly across individuals. Developmental delay and slightly dysmorphic facial features are the most frequent symptoms. But this isn't a diagnosis that can be diagnosed clinically, and some people with this microdeletion don't show any clear symptoms at all.

It is difficult to identify the dysmorphic facial traits associated with 1q21.1 microduplications. The findings that are most frequently recorded include frontal bossing, hypertelorism, and (relative) macrocephaly.

About 18 and 29% of patients with proximal and distal 1q21.1 microduplications, respectively, have congenital cardiac abnormalities. These include a wide range of anomalies, such as Septal Defects, conotruncal, left- and right-sided defects, and other heart abnormalities.

== Causes ==
1q21.1 duplication syndrome arises from microduplications of the BP3-BP4 region, containing at least seven genes and a minimum duplicated region of ~1.2 Mb of unique DNA sequence. 1q21.1 duplication syndrome has an autosomal dominant inheritance pattern, where 18–50% of deletions happen de novo and 50–82% are inherited from their parents.

=== Genetics ===
The 1q21.1 area is one of the largest regions in the human genome with repetitive duplication, rendering it prone to copy number variation. Because of its frequent low-copy duplications, it is thought to be the most genetically unstable fragment. The 1q21.1 area contains 20–40 genes. There are two main ways that the copy number variations of 1q21.1 might appear: Type I, which spans roughly 1.8 Mb and includes only the distal end area of 1q21.1, and type 2, which extends proximally to include the thrombocytopenia absent radius syndrome region, span around 2.7 Mb.

== Diagnosis ==
For children with 1q21.1 microduplication syndrome, whole exon sequencing in conjunction with quantitative polymerase chain reaction can yield a precise molecular diagnosis.

== Epidemiology ==
The ratio of sexes does not significantly differ. About 0.03% of adults exhibit microduplication of 1q21.1, while the frequency in live births is estimated to be 1/6309.

== Research ==
Statistical research showed that schizophrenia is significantly more common in combination with 1q21.1 deletion syndrome. On the other side, autism is significantly more common with 1q21.1 duplication syndrome. Similar observations were done for chromosome 16 on 16p11.2 (deletion: autism/duplication: schizophrenia), chromosome 22 on 22q11.21 (deletion (Velo-cardio-facial syndrome): schizophrenia/duplication: autism) and 22q13.3 (deletion (Phelan-McDermid syndrome): schizophrenia/duplication: autism). Further research confirmed that the odds on a relation between schizophrenia and deletions at 1q21.1, 3q29, 15q13.3, 22q11.21 en Neurexin 1 (NRXN1) and duplications at 16p11.2 are at 7.5% or higher.

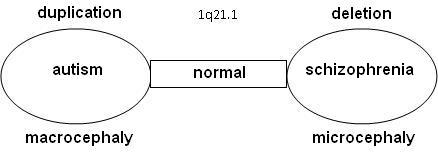
Observed relation within 1q21.1

Common variations in the BCL9 gene, which is in the distal area, confer risk of schizophrenia and may also be associated with bipolar disorder and major depressive disorder.

Research is done on 10-12 genes on 1q21.1 that produce DUF1220-locations. DUF1220 is an unknown protein, which is active in the neurons of the brain near the neocortex. Based on research on apes and other mammals, it is assumed that DUF1220 is related to cognitive development (man: 212 locations; chimpanzee: 37 locations; monkey: 30 locations; mouse: 1 location). It appears that the DUF1220-locations on 1q21.1 are in areas that are related to the size and the development of the brain. The aspect of the size and development of the brain is related to autism (macrocephaly) and schizophrenia (microcephaly). It is assumed that a deletion or a duplication of a gene that produces DUF1220-areas might cause growth and development disorders in the brain

Another relation between macrocephaly with duplications and microcephaly with deletions has been seen in research on the HYDIN Paralog or HYDIN2. This part of 1q21.1 is involved in the development of the brain. It is assumed to be a dosage-sensitive gene. When this gene is not available in the 1q21.1 area it leads to microcephaly. HYDIN2 is a recent duplication (found only in humans) of the HYDIN gene found on 16q22.2.

GJA5 has been identified as the gene that is responsible for the phenotypes observed with congenital heart diseases on the 1q21.1 location. In case of a duplication of GJA5 tetralogy of Fallot is more common. In case of a deletion other congenital heart diseases than tetralogy of Fallot are more common.

== See also ==
- 1q21.1 copy number variations
- 1q21.1 deletion syndrome
