= Acyl-CoA synthetase =

Family of enzymes

Acyl-CoA synthetases, also known as acyl-CoA ligases, are enzymes that "activate" fatty acids by thioesterification to coenzyme A. It represents the initial step of fatty acid metabolism so that fatty acids can participate in catabolic and anabolic pathways. Among these are, for example, the synthesis of triacylglycerol, phospholipids, plasmalogens, sphingolipids, the degradation of fatty acids for energy production, the conversion to alcohols or aldehydes, the elongation of fatty acids, the insertion and removal of double bonds or the covalent binding to proteins.

The members of this family mainly activate fatty acids, but there are also members that activate other substrates instead, such as AACS, which activates the keto acid acetoacetic acid, or ACSF3, which activates the dicarboxylic acids methylmalonic acid and malonic acid.

== Reaction ==
Acyl-CoA synthetases catalyze fatty acid activation, which consists of 2 steps. First, an ATP-dependent adenylation and release of pyrophophates takes place:

$\mathrm{Fatt{y}\ acid + ATP\ \xrightarrow \ Acyl{-}AMP + PP_i}$

In the 2nd step, CoA-SH displaces the adenylate group, which is released as AMP, and forms a thioester bond with the substrate.

$\mathrm{Acyl{-}AMP + CoA{-}SH\ \xrightarrow \ Acyl{-S-}CoA + AMP}$

In summary:

$\mathrm{Fatt{y}\ acid + CoA + ATP\ \xrightarrow \ Acyl{-}CoA + AMP + PP_i}$

== Members ==
| Symbol | Name | Localization | EC number | Preferred substrate | Product | Enzyme defect | Prevalence |
|---|---|---|---|---|---|---|---|
Short-chain acyl-CoA synthetase family
| ACSS1 | Acyl-CoA synthetase short-chain family member 1 | Mitochondrion | EC 6.2.1.1 EC 6.2.1.17 | Acetate | Acetyl-CoA | | |
| ACSS2 | Acyl-CoA synthetase short-chain family member 2 | Cytosol | EC 6.2.1.1 EC 6.2.1.17 | Acetate | Acetyl-CoA | | |
| ACSS3 | Acyl-CoA synthetase short-chain family member 3 | Mitochondrial matrix | EC 6.2.1.1 EC 6.2.1.17 | Propionate | Propionyl-CoA | | |
Medium-chain acyl-CoA synthetase family (C6-C10)
| ACSM1 | Acyl-CoA synthetase medium-chain family member 1 | Mitochondrial matrix | EC 6.2.1.2 EC 6.2.1.25 | | | | |
| ACSM2A | Acyl-CoA synthetase medium-chain family member 2A | Mitochondrion | EC 6.2.1.2 EC 6.2.1.25 | Medium chain fatty acids | | | |
| ACSM2B | Acyl-CoA synthetase medium-chain family member 2B | Mitochondrion | EC 6.2.1.2 EC 6.2.1.25 | | | | |
| ACSM3 | Acyl-CoA synthetase medium-chain family member 3 | Mitochondrion | EC 6.2.1.17 EC 6.2.1.2 | | | | |
| ACSM4 | Acyl-CoA synthetase medium-chain family member 4 | Mitochondrion | EC 6.2.1.2 | | Decanoate-CoA (predicted) | | |
| ACSM5 | Acyl-CoA synthetase medium-chain family member 5 | Mitochondrion | EC 6.2.1.2 | | | | |
| ACSM6 | Acyl-CoA synthetase medium-chain family member 6 | Mitochondrion | EC 6.2.1.2 | | | | |
Long-chain acyl-CoA synthetase family
| ACSL1 | Acyl-CoA synthetase long-chain family member 1 | | EC 6.2.1.15 EC 6.2.1.24 EC 6.2.1.3 | Free long-chain fatty acids | Fatty acyl-CoA esters | | |
| ACSL3 | Acyl-CoA synthetase long-chain family member 3 | | EC 6.2.1.15 EC 6.2.1.2 EC 6.2.1.3 | Myristate, arachidonate, eicosapentaenoate | | | |
| ACSL4 | Acyl-CoA synthetase long-chain family member 4 | Peroxisome | EC 6.2.1.15 EC 6.2.1.3 | Arachidonate | | Intellectual developmental disorder, X-linked 63 | |
| ACSL5 | Acyl-CoA synthetase long-chain family member 5 | | EC 6.2.1.15 EC 6.2.1.3 | | | | |
| ACSL6 | Acyl-CoA synthetase long-chain family member 6 | | EC 6.2.1.15 EC 6.2.1.3 | | | | |
Very long-chain acyl-CoA synthetase family (>C22)
| SLC27A1 | Solute carrier family 27 (fatty acid transporter), member 1 | Plasma membrane | EC 6.2.1.15 EC 6.2.1.3 | | | | |
| SLC27A2 | Solute carrier family 27 (fatty acid transporter), member 2 | Endoplasmic reticulum, peroxisome | EC 6.2.1.15 EC 6.2.1.24 EC 6.2.1.3 EC 6.2.1.7 | Long-chain, branched-chain and very long-chain fatty acids | Fatty acyl-CoA esters | | |
| SLC27A3 | Solute carrier family 27 (fatty acid transporter), member 3 | | EC 6.2.1.15 EC 6.2.1.3 | | | | |
| SLC27A4 | Solute carrier family 27 (fatty acid transporter), member 4 | Peroxisome | EC 6.2.1.15 EC 6.2.1.3 | | | Ichthyosis prematurity syndrome | |
| SLC27A5 | Solute carrier family 27 (fatty acid transporter), member 5 | Endoplasmic reticulum | EC 6.2.1.3 EC 6.2.1.7 | Very long-chain fatty-acids containing 24- and 26-carbons | | | |
| SLC27A6 | Solute carrier family 27 (fatty acid transporter), member 6 | | EC 6.2.1.15 EC 6.2.1.3 | | | | |
Bubblegum acyl-CoA synthetase family
| ACSBG1 | Acyl-CoA synthetase bubblegum family member 1 | | EC 6.2.1.3 | | | | |
| ACSBG2 | Acyl-CoA synthetase bubblegum family member 2 | Cytosol, Mitochondrion | EC 6.2.1.15 EC 6.2.1.3 | | | | |
Other acyl-CoA synthetases
| AACS | Acetoacetyl-CoA synthetase | Cytosol (predicted) | EC 6.2.1.16 | Acetoacetate | Acetoacetyl-CoA (predicted) | | |
| ACSF2 | Acyl-CoA synthetase family member 2 | Mitochondrion | EC 6.2.1.2 | | | | |
| ACSF3 | Acyl-CoA synthetase family member 3 | Mitochondrion | EC 6.2.1.76 | Malonate, methylmalonate, lignocerate | Malonyl-CoA, methylmalonyl-CoA | Combined malonic and methylmalonic aciduria (CMAMMA) | 1: 30,000 |
| AASDH | Aminoadipate-semialdehyde dehydrogenase | | EC 6.2.1.- | | | | |

== See also ==
- Acyl-CoA
- Long-chain acyl-CoA synthetase
