= Alpha oxidation =

Metabolic pathway

Enzymatic steps of alpha oxidation

Alpha oxidation (α-oxidation) is a process by which certain fatty acids are broken down by removal of a single carbon from the carboxyl end. This is generally applied to fatty acids resistant to beta-oxidation, the other process for fatty acid breakdown. In humans, alpha-oxidation is used:

- In peroxisomes to break down dietary phytanic acid, which cannot undergo beta-oxidation due to its β-methyl branch, into pristanic acid. Pristanic acid can then acquire CoA and subsequently become beta oxidized, yielding propionyl-CoA.
- In the endoplasmic reticulum to break down phytosphingosine, which cannot undergo beta-oxidation due to its 4-hydroxy group, into pentadecanoic acid, which can then be beta-oxidized after acquiring CoA.

== Pathway ==
=== Phytanic acid ===
Alpha-oxidation of phytanic acid is believed to take place entirely within peroxisomes.

1. Phytanic acid is first attached to CoA to form phytanoyl-CoA.
2. Phytanoyl-CoA is oxidized by phytanoyl-CoA dioxygenase (PHYH), in a process using Fe^{2+} and O_{2}, to yield 2-hydroxyphytanoyl-CoA.
3. 2-hydroxyphytanoyl-CoA is cleaved by 2-hydroxyphytanoyl-CoA lyase (specifically HACL1) in a TPP-dependent reaction to form pristanal and formyl-CoA (in turn later broken down into formate and eventually CO_{2}).
4. Pristanal is oxidized by aldehyde dehydrogenase (specifically ALDH3A2) to form pristanic acid.

(Propionyl-CoA is released as a result of beta oxidation when the beta carbon is substituted)

=== Phytosphingosine ===
Alpha-oxidation of phytosphingosine and other sphingolipid components can entirely happen in the endoplasmic reticulum (ER), as all components of the main pathway are found in the ER.

1. Phytosphingosine (PHS) is phosphorylated to PHS 1-phosphate by SPH kinase. This is mainly catalyzed by SPHK2.
2. PHS-1P is converted to 2-hydroxypalmital (2-OH C16:0-CHO) by SGPL1.
3. 2-OH C16:0-CHO is converted to 2-hydroxypalmitate (2-OH C16:0-COOH) by ALDH3A2.
4. 2-OH C16:0-COOH is converted to 2-hydroxypalmityl-CoA (2-OH C16:0-CoA) by one of the long-chain acyl-CoA synthetases (ACSs).
5. 2-OH C16:0-CoA is converted to pentadecanoal (C15:0-CHO) by HACL2, which is also TPP-dependent (HACL1 can compensate if HACL2 is knocked out).
6. C15:0-CHO is converted to pentadecanoic acid (C15:0-COOH) by ALDH3A2.
7. C15:0-COOH is converted to pentadecanoyl-CoA by one of the long-chain ACSs.

== Deficiency ==
Enzymatic deficiency in phytanic acid alpha-oxidation (most frequently in phytanoyl-CoA dioxygenase) leads to Refsum's disease, in which the accumulation of phytanic acid and its derivatives leads to neurological damage. Other disorders of peroxisome biogenesis also prevent alpha-oxidation from occurring.

ALDH3A2 deficiency is known to cause the neurocutaneous disorder Sjögren–Larsson syndrome, in which accumulated aldehydes damage skin and nerve cells: cells that have the most sphingolipid turnover.
