= 2-hydroxyacyl-CoA lyase =

Class of enzymes

Identifiers
- EC no.: 4.1.2.63
- Alt. names: 2-Hydroxyphytanoyl-CoA lyase (technically narrower)

Databases
- BRENDA: enzyme data
- ExPASy: NiceZyme view
- KEGG: enzyme entry
- MetaCyc: metabolic pathway
- Rhea: reactions
- PDB structures: RCSB PDB PDBe PDBsum
- Gene Ontology: AmiGO / QuickGO
Search
- PMC: articles
- PubMed: articles
- NCBI: proteins

2-Hydroxyacyl-CoA lyase (EC 4.1.2.63) is an enzyme found in the peroxisomes of eukaryotes that catalyzes the following leading-up step of alpha oxidation:

1. a 2-hydroxy-3-methyl fatty acyl-CoA = a 2-methyl-branched fatty aldehyde + formyl-CoA
2. an (R)-2-hydroxy-long-chain-fatty acyl-CoA = a long-chain fatty aldehyde + formyl-CoA

It requires thiamine diphosphate (ThDP) as cofactor.

== In animals ==
The entry is intended to mainly represent the class of enzymes examplified by human HACL1 (gene), which can catalyze both reactions and is found in the peroxisome. It is required for handling phytanic acid.

Humans and other mammals have another similar enzymes that only catalyzes reaction (2) and is instead located in the endoplasmic reticulum, HACL2 (gene). This one participates in phytosphingosine degradation.

== In fungi ==
Both the baker's yeast and the fission yeast have a Pxp1 gene corresponding to this activity, as annotated on UniProt by sequence similarity (not by experimental characterization of enzyme activity). These two versions are known to appear in the cytoplasm and the peroxisome based on experimental evidence listed in UniProt.

== In plants ==
Both the mouse-ear cress (Arath) and the rice have a HACL gene corresponding to this activity, as annotated on UniProt by sequence similarity (not by experimental characterization of enzyme activity). The Arath version is experimentally detected in the cytoplasm, peroxisome, and plastid.

== In other organisms ==
UniProt reports that the social ameoba Dictyostelium discoideum has a version of this enzyme, as annotated on UniProt by sequence similarity (not by experimental characterization of enzyme activity).
