= Alpha-methylacyl-CoA racemase =

Protein-coding gene in the species Homo sapiens

AMACR

Identifiers
- Aliases: AMACR, AMACRD, CBAS4, RACE, RM, alpha-methylacyl-CoA racemase, P504S
- External IDs: OMIM: 604489; MGI: 1098273; HomoloGene: 7410; GeneCards: AMACR; OMA:AMACR - orthologs
- EC number: 5.1.99.4

Gene location (Human)
Chr.	Chromosome 5 (human)
Band	5p13.2	Start	33,986,165 bp
Band	5p13.2	End	34,008,104 bp

Gene location (Mouse)
Chr.	Chromosome 15 (mouse)
Band	15|15 A1	Start	10,981,842 bp
Band	15|15 A1	End	10,996,712 bp
RNA expression pattern
Bgee	Human / Mouse (ortholog); Top expressed in: rectum; liver; human kidney; mucosa of transverse colon; right lobe of liver; islet of Langerhans; Achilles tendon; fundus; renal cortex; gallbladder / Top expressed in: right kidney; left lobe of liver; proximal tubule; human kidney; myocardium of ventricle; intercostal muscle; digastric muscle; sternocleidomastoid muscle; cardiac muscles; triceps brachii muscle; More reference expression data
BioGPS	n/a
Gene ontology
Molecular function	signaling receptor binding; catalytic activity; isomerase activity; alpha-methylacyl-CoA racemase activity
Cellular component	cytoplasm; peroxisome; peroxisomal matrix; mitochondrion; plasma membrane; intracellular membrane-bounded organelle; cytosol
Biological process	bile acid biosynthetic process; fatty acid beta-oxidation using acyl-CoA oxidase; fatty acid metabolic process; bile acid metabolic process; protein targeting to peroxisome
Sources:Amigo / QuickGO
Orthologs
Species	Human	Mouse
Entrez	23600	17117
Ensembl	ENSG00000242110	ENSMUSG00000022244
UniProt	Q9UHK6	O09174
RefSeq (mRNA)	NM_203382; NM_001167595; NM_001167596; NM_001167597; NM_001167598 NM_014324	NM_008537
RefSeq (protein)	NP_001161067; NP_055139; NP_976316	NP_032563
Location (UCSC)	Chr 5: 33.99 – 34.01 Mb	Chr 15: 10.98 – 11 Mb
PubMed search
- Wikidata
View/Edit Human	View/Edit Mouse

α-Methylacyl-CoA racemase (AMACR, EC 5.1.99.4) is an enzyme that in humans is encoded by the AMACR gene. AMACR catalyzes the following chemical reaction:

(2R)-2-methylacyl-CoA $\rightleftharpoons$ (2S)-2-methylacyl-CoA

In mammalian cells, the enzyme is responsible for converting (2R)-methylacyl-CoA esters to their (2S)-methylacyl-CoA epimers and known substrates, including coenzyme A esters of pristanic acid (mostly derived from phytanic acid, a 3-methyl branched-chain fatty acid that is abundant in the diet) and bile acids derived from cholesterol. This transformation is required in order to degrade (2R)-methylacyl-CoA esters by β-oxidation, which process requires the (2S)-epimer. The enzyme is known to be localised in peroxisomes and mitochondria, both of which are known to β-oxidize 2-methylacyl-CoA esters.

== Nomenclature ==
alpha-methylacyl-CoA racemase

Identifiers
- EC no.: 5.1.99.4
- CAS no.: 156681-44-6

Databases
- IntEnz: IntEnz view
- BRENDA: BRENDA entry
- ExPASy: NiceZyme view
- KEGG: KEGG entry
- MetaCyc: metabolic pathway
- PRIAM: profile
- PDB structures: RCSB PDB PDBe PDBsum
- Gene Ontology: AmiGO / QuickGO
Search
- PMC: articles
- PubMed: articles
- NCBI: proteins

This enzyme belongs to the family of isomerases, specifically the racemases and epimerases which act on other compounds. The systematic name of this enzyme class is 2-methylacyl-CoA 2-epimerase. In vitro experiments with the human enzyme AMACR 1A show that both (2S)- and (2R)-methyldecanoyl-CoA esters are substrates and are converted by the enzyme with very similar efficiency. Prolonged incubation of either substrate with the enzyme establishes an equilibrium with both substrates or products present in a near 1:1 ratio. The mechanism of the enzyme requires removal of the α-proton of the 2-methylacyl-CoA to form a deprotonated intermediate (which is probably the enol or enolate) followed by non-sterespecific reprotonation. Thus either epimer is converted into a near 1:1 mixture of both isomers upon full conversion of the substrate.

== Clinical significance ==
Both decreased and increased levels of the enzyme in humans are linked with diseases.

=== Neurological diseases ===
Reduction of the protein level or activity results in the accumulation of (2R)-methyl fatty acids such as bile acids which causes neurological symptoms. The symptoms are similar to those of adult Refsum disease and usually appear in the late teens or early twenties.

The first documented cases of AMACR deficiency in adults were reported in 2000. This deficiency falls within a class of disorders called peroxisome biogenesis disorders (PBDs), although it is quite different from other peroxisomal disorders and does not share classic Refsum disorder symptoms. The deficiency causes an accumulation of pristanic acid, dihydroxycholestanoic acid (DHCA) and trihydroxycholestanoic acid (THCA) and to a lesser extent phytanic acid. This phenomenon was verified in 2002, when researchers reported of a certain case, "His condition would have been missed if they hadn't measured the pristanic acid concentration."

AMACR deficiency can cause mental impairment, confusion, learning difficulties, and liver damage. It can be treated by dietary elimination of pristanic and phytanic acid through reduced intake of dairy products and meats such as beef, lamb, and chicken. Compliance to the diet is low, however, because of eating habits and loss of weight.

=== Cancer ===
Increased levels of AMACR protein concentration and activity are associated with prostate cancer, and the enzyme is used widely as a biomarker (known in cancer literature as P504S) in biopsy tissues. Around 10 different variants of human AMACR have been identified from prostate cancer tissues, which variants arise from alternative mRNA splicing. Some of these splice variants lack catalytic residues in the active site or have changes in the C-terminus, which is required for dimerisation. Increased levels of AMACR are also associated with some breast, colon, and other cancers, but it is unclear exactly what the role of AMACR is in these cancers.

Antibodies to AMACR are used in immunohistochemistry to demonstrate prostate carcinoma, since the enzyme is greatly overexpressed in this type of tumour.

=== Ibuprofen metabolism ===
The enzyme is also involved in a chiral inversion pathway which converts ibuprofen, a member of the 2-arylpropionic acid (2-APA) non-steroidal anti-inflammatory drug family (NSAIDs), from the R-enantiomer to the S-enantiomer. The pathway is uni-directional because only R-ibuprofen can be converted into ibuprofenoyl-CoA, which is then epimerized by AMACR. Conversion of S-ibuprofenoyl-CoA to S-ibuprofen is assumed to be performed by one of the many human acyl-CoA thioesterase enzymes (ACOTs). The reaction is of pharmacological importance because ibuprofen is typically used as a racemic mixture, and the drug is converted to the S-isomer upon uptake, which inhibits the activity of the cyclo-oxygenase enzymes and induces an anti-inflammatory effect. Human AMACR 1A has been demonstrated to epimerise other 2-APA-CoA esters, suggesting a common chiral inversion pathway for this class of drugs.
