= Fatty acid transport proteins =

Family of transport proteins

Fatty acid transport proteins (FATPs, SLC27, SLC27A) are a family of trans-membrane transport proteins, which allow and enhance the uptake of long chain fatty acids into cells. This subfamily is part of the solute carrier protein family. Within humans this family contains six very homologous proteins, which are expressed in all tissues of the body which use fatty acids:

- SLC27A1 (FATP1) Long-chain fatty acid transport protein 1
- SLC27A2 (FATP2) Very long-chain acyl-CoA synthetase
- SLC27A3 (FATP3) Solute carrier family 27 member 3
- SLC27A4 (FATP4) Long-chain fatty acid transport protein 4
- SLC27A5 (FATP5) Bile acyl-CoA synthetase
- SLC27A6 (FATP6) Long-chain fatty acid transport protein 6
