= HACL2 =

Protein-coding gene in the species Homo sapiens

Identifiers
- Aliases: ILVBL, 209L8, AHAS, ILV2H, ilvB (bacterial acetolactate synthase)-like, HACL1L, ilvB acetolactate synthase like
- External IDs: OMIM: 605770; MGI: 1351911; GeneCards: ILVBL

Gene location (Human)
Chr.	Chromosome 19 (human)
Band	19p13.12	Start	15,114,984 bp
Band	19p13.12	End	15,125,786 bp

Gene location (Mouse)
Chr.	Chromosome 10 (mouse)
Band	10 C1|10 39.72 cM	Start	78,410,180 bp
Band	10 C1|10 39.72 cM	End	78,420,336 bp
RNA expression pattern
Bgee	Human / Mouse (ortholog); Top expressed in: apex of heart; right auricle of heart; mucosa of transverse colon; left ventricle; right adrenal cortex; right lobe of thyroid gland; left adrenal cortex; body of stomach; muscle layer of sigmoid colon; pancreatic ductal cell / Top expressed in: jejunum; otolith organ; utricle; thymus; duodenum; ileum; proximal tubule; right kidney; esophagus; lip; More reference expression data
BioGPS	n/a
Gene ontology
Molecular function	transferase activity; thiamine pyrophosphate binding; protein binding; catalytic activity; magnesium ion binding; metal ion binding; molecular function
Cellular component	integral component of membrane; membrane
Biological process	biological process
Sources:Amigo / QuickGO
Orthologs
Databases	NCBI: entry; OMA: entry
Species	Human	Mouse
Entrez	10994	216136
Ensembl	ENSG00000105135	ENSMUSG00000032763
UniProt	A1L0T0; E9PL44	Q8BU33
RefSeq (mRNA)	NM_006844; NM_176826	NM_173751; NM_001359301; NM_001359302; NM_001359303
RefSeq (protein)	NP_006835	NP_776112; NP_001346230; NP_001346231; NP_001346232
Location (UCSC)	Chr 19: 15.11 – 15.13 Mb	Chr 10: 78.41 – 78.42 Mb
PubMed search
- Wikidata
View/Edit Human	View/Edit Mouse

2-hydroxyacyl-CoA lyase 2 is a protein that in humans is encoded by the HACL2 gene. It was originally called ILVBL (ilvB-like) for its similarity to acetolactate synthase.

== Function ==
The protein product catalyzes the cleavage step of alpha oxidation in the endoplasmic reticulum. Specifically it is an enzyme that cleaves a 2-hydroxyhexadecanoyl (or hydroxyoctadecanoyl) CoA into coenzyme A and the corresponding aldehyde, heptadecanal or pentadecanal. It is involved in phytosphingosine degradation.

There is no specific Enzyme Commission number for this activity as of 2026, being only vaguely categorizable as 4.1.2.-. It has a paralog in humans, HACL1 (gene), which performs a similar reaction in the peroxisome and is considered EC 4.1.2.62 (2-hydroxyacyl-CoA lyase).

== Structure ==
=== Gene ===
Human ILVBL gene has 17 exons resides on chromosome 19 at q13.1.

== Clinical significance ==
CADASIL, an identified autosomal dominant condition characterized by the recurrence of subcortical infarcts leading to dementia, was previously mapped to “ILVBL” gene within a 2-cM interval, D19S226–D19S199. This gene encodes a protein highly similar to the acetolactate synthase of other organisms. No recombination event was observed with D19S841, a highly polymorphic microsatellite marker isolated from a cosmid mapped to this region. No mutation was detected on this gene in CADASIL patients, suggesting that it is not implicated in this disorder.
