= Butyrate—CoA ligase =

Type of enzyme

Identifiers
- EC no.: 6.2.1.2
- CAS no.: 9080-51-7

Databases
- IntEnz: IntEnz view
- BRENDA: BRENDA entry
- ExPASy: NiceZyme view
- KEGG: KEGG entry
- MetaCyc: metabolic pathway
- PRIAM: profile
- PDB structures: RCSB PDB PDBe PDBsum
- Gene Ontology: AmiGO / QuickGO
Search
- PMC: articles
- PubMed: articles
- NCBI: proteins

Butyrate—CoA ligase, also known as xenobiotic/medium-chain fatty acid-ligase (XM-ligase), is an enzyme (EC 6.2.1.2) that catalyzes the chemical reaction:

ATP + a carboxylic acid + CoA $\rightleftharpoons$ AMP + diphosphate + an acyl-CoA

The 3 substrates of this enzyme are ATP, carboxylic acid, and CoA, whereas its 3 products are AMP, diphosphate, and acyl-CoA.

This enzyme belongs to the family of ligases, specifically those forming carbon-sulfur bonds as acid-thiol ligases. This enzyme participates in the glycine conjugation of xenobiotics and butanoate metabolism.

== Nomenclature ==
The systematic name of this enzyme class is butanoate:CoA ligase (AMP-forming). Other names in common use include:

- butyryl-CoA synthetase, fatty acid thiokinase (medium chain),
- acyl-activating enzyme, fatty acid elongate,
- fatty acid activating enzyme,
- fatty acyl coenzyme A synthetase,
- medium chain acyl-CoA synthetase,
- butyryl-coenzyme A synthetase,
- L-(+)-3-hydroxybutyryl CoA ligase,
- xenobiotic/medium-chain fatty acid ligase, and
- short-chain acyl-CoA synthetase.

== Human proteins containing this domain ==
- ACSM1
- ACSM2A
- ACSM2B
- ACSM3
- ACSM4
- ACSM5
- ACSM6
