= Refsum =

Refsum is a surname. Notable people with the surname include:

- Helge Refsum (1897-1976), Norwegian jurist and politician
- Maja Refsum (1897–1986), Norwegian sculptor and teacher
- Marie Borge Refsum (born 1927), Norwegian politician
- Sigvald Bernhard Refsum (1907–1991), Norwegian neurologist
- Thomas Refsum (1878–1957), Norwegian sport shooter
- Tor Hermod Refsum (1894–1981), Norwegian painter

== See also ==
- Refsum disease
