= C20H40O2 =

The molecular formula C_{20}H_{40}O_{2} (molar mass: 312.53 g/mol, exact mass: 312.3028 u) may refer to:

- Arachidic acid, also called eicosanoic acid
- Phytanic acid
