= C15H30O2 =

The molecular formula C_{15}H_{30}O_{2} (molar mass: 242.40 g/mol, exact mass: 242.2246 u) may refer to:

- 13-Methyltetradecanoic acid (13-MTD)
- Pentadecylic acid, or pentadecanoic acid
