= AACS =

AACS may refer to:

- AACS (gene), a human gene
- Advanced Access Content System, a standard for content distribution and digital rights management
  - AACS encryption key controversy
- American Association of Christian Schools, an organization that unifies individual Christian schools and statewide Christian school associations
- Annapolis Area Christian School, a Christian school in Maryland, US
- Attitude and Articulation Control Subsystems, used to orient space probes relative to a fixed point
