= SUR2 =

SUR2 may refer to:

- Sulfonylurea receptor
- Sphinganine C4-monooxygenase
