= Sphinganine C4-monooxygenase =

Class of enzymes

Identifiers
- EC no.: 1.14.13.169

Databases
- IntEnz: IntEnz view
- BRENDA: BRENDA entry
- ExPASy: NiceZyme view
- KEGG: KEGG entry
- MetaCyc: metabolic pathway
- PRIAM: profile
- PDB structures: RCSB PDB PDBe PDBsum
Search
- PMC: articles
- PubMed: articles
- NCBI: proteins

Sphinganine C4-monooxygenase (EC 1.14.13.169, sphingolipid C4-hydroxylase, SUR2 (gene), SBH1 (gene), SBH2 (gene)) is an enzyme with systematic name sphinganine,NADPH:oxygen oxidoreductase (C4-hydroxylating). This enzyme catalyses the following chemical reaction

sphinganine + NADPH + H^{+} + O_{2} $\rightleftharpoons$ phytosphingosine + NADP^{+} + H_{2}O

Sphinganine C4-monooxygenase is involved in the biosynthesis of sphingolipids in yeast and plants.
