= Phytanate—CoA ligase =

Identifiers
- EC no.: 6.2.1.24
- CAS no.: 105238-50-4

Databases
- IntEnz: IntEnz view
- BRENDA: BRENDA entry
- ExPASy: NiceZyme view
- KEGG: KEGG entry
- MetaCyc: metabolic pathway
- PRIAM: profile
- PDB structures: RCSB PDB PDBe PDBsum
- Gene Ontology: AmiGO / QuickGO
Search
- PMC: articles
- PubMed: articles
- NCBI: proteins

In enzymology, a phytanate—CoA ligase (EC 6.2.1.24) is an enzyme that catalyzes the chemical reaction

ATP + phytanate + CoA $\rightleftharpoons$ AMP + diphosphate + phytanoyl-CoA

The 3 substrates of this enzyme are ATP, phytanate, and CoA, whereas its 3 products are AMP, diphosphate, and phytanoyl-CoA.

This enzyme belongs to the family of ligases, specifically those forming carbon-sulfur bonds as acid-thiol ligases. The systematic name of this enzyme class is phytanate:CoA ligase (AMP-forming). This enzyme is also called phytanoyl-CoA ligase.
