= ACSBG1 =

Protein-coding gene in the species Homo sapiens

Identifiers
- Aliases: ACSBG1, BG, BG1, BGM, GR-LACS, LPD, acyl-CoA synthetase bubblegum family member 1
- External IDs: OMIM: 614362; MGI: 2385656; HomoloGene: 9044; GeneCards: ACSBG1; OMA:ACSBG1 - orthologs

Gene location (Human)
Chr.	Chromosome 15 (human)
Band	15q25.1	Start	78,167,468 bp
Band	15q25.1	End	78,245,688 bp

Gene location (Mouse)
Chr.	Chromosome 9 (mouse)
Band	9|9 A5.3	Start	54,512,161 bp
Band	9|9 A5.3	End	54,569,154 bp
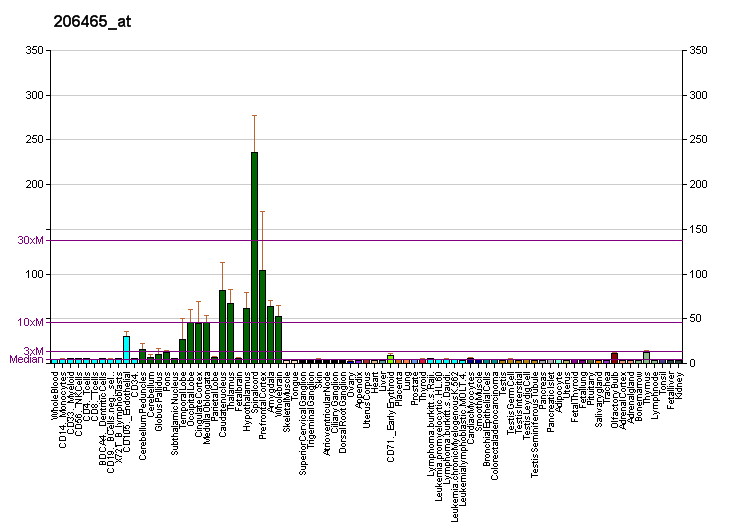

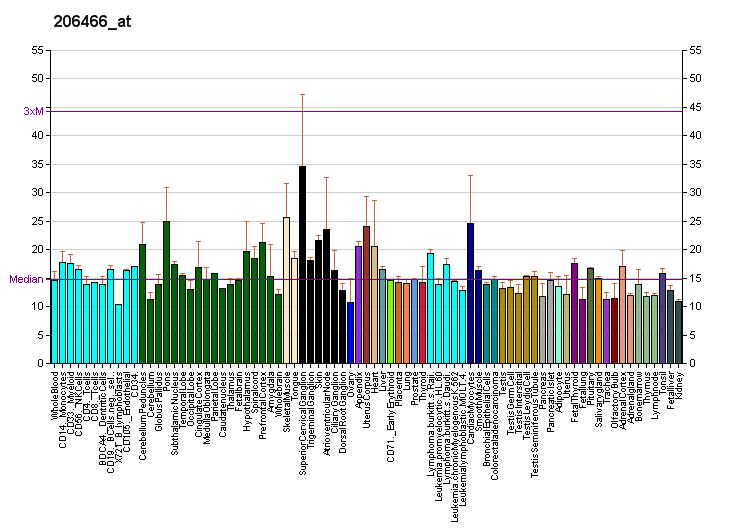
RNA expression pattern
Bgee	Human / Mouse (ortholog); Top expressed in: skin of thigh; inferior olivary nucleus; C1 segment; dorsal motor nucleus of vagus nerve; endothelial cell; internal globus pallidus; putamen; caudate nucleus; skin of arm; substantia nigra / Top expressed in: lip; cerebellar cortex; deep cerebellar nuclei; adrenal gland; skin of external ear; visual cortex; esophagus; lobe of cerebellum; superior frontal gyrus; primary visual cortex; More reference expression data
BioGPS	More reference expression data
Gene ontology
Molecular function	nucleotide binding; ligase activity; catalytic activity; ATP binding; decanoate-CoA ligase activity; long-chain fatty acid-CoA ligase activity; very long-chain fatty acid-CoA ligase activity
Cellular component	cytosol; intracellular membrane-bounded organelle; endoplasmic reticulum; cytoplasmic vesicle; cytoplasm
Biological process	lipid metabolism; very long-chain fatty acid metabolic process; response to glucocorticoid; fatty acid metabolic process; long-chain fatty-acyl-CoA biosynthetic process; myelination; metabolism; long-chain fatty acid metabolic process
Sources:Amigo / QuickGO
Orthologs
Species	Human	Mouse
Entrez	23205	94180
Ensembl	ENSG00000103740	ENSMUSG00000032281
UniProt	Q96GR2	Q99PU5
RefSeq (mRNA)	NM_001199377; NM_015162	NM_053178
RefSeq (protein)	NP_001186306; NP_055977	NP_444408
Location (UCSC)	Chr 15: 78.17 – 78.25 Mb	Chr 9: 54.51 – 54.57 Mb
PubMed search
- Wikidata
View/Edit Human	View/Edit Mouse

Acyl-CoA Synthetase, Bubblegum Family, member 1 (ACSBG1) is an enzyme that in humans is encoded by the ACSBG1 gene.

The protein encoded by this gene possesses long-chain acyl-CoA synthetase activity. It is thought to play a central role in brain very long-chain fatty acids metabolism and myelinogenesis. The conversion of long chain fatty acids into long chain acyl-CoAs in mice is catalysed by ACSBG1.
