= HACL1 =

Protein-coding gene in the species Homo sapiens

Identifiers
- Aliases: HACL1, 2-HPCL, HPCL, HPCL2, PHYH2, 2-hydroxyacyl-CoA lyase 1
- External IDs: OMIM: 604300; MGI: 1929657; GeneCards: HACL1
Enzyme activity
EC #	BRENDA	ExPASy	KEGG	MetaCyc
4.1.2.63	↗	↗	↗	↗

Gene location (Human)
Chr.	Chromosome 3 (human)
Band	3p25.1	Start	15,560,699 bp
Band	3p25.1	End	15,601,852 bp

Gene location (Mouse)
Chr.	Chromosome 14 (mouse)
Band	14|14 B	Start	31,320,687 bp
Band	14|14 B	End	31,363,243 bp
RNA expression pattern
Bgee	Human / Mouse (ortholog); Top expressed in: jejunal mucosa; duodenum; right lobe of liver; secondary oocyte; gonad; skin of arm; mucosa of ileum; testicle; right testis; skin of thigh / Top expressed in: liver; lip; renal cortex; spermatocyte; proximal tubule; human kidney; right kidney; white adipose tissue; vasculature of organ; bone marrow; More reference expression data
BioGPS	n/a
Gene ontology
Molecular function	thiamine pyrophosphate binding; signaling receptor binding; protein binding; catalytic activity; magnesium ion binding; metal ion binding; lyase activity; carbon-carbon lyase activity; identical protein binding
Cellular component	peroxisome; peroxisomal matrix; cytosol
Biological process	fatty acid alpha-oxidation; protein complex oligomerization; fatty acid metabolic process; protein targeting to peroxisome; lipid metabolism
Sources:Amigo / QuickGO
Orthologs
Databases	NCBI: entry; OMA: entry
Species	Human	Mouse
Entrez	26061	56794
Ensembl	ENSG00000131373	ENSMUSG00000021884
UniProt	Q9UJ83	Q9QXE0
RefSeq (mRNA)	NM_001284413; NM_001284415; NM_001284416; NM_012260	NM_019975
RefSeq (protein)	NP_001271342; NP_001271344; NP_001271345; NP_036392	NP_064359
Location (UCSC)	Chr 3: 15.56 – 15.6 Mb	Chr 14: 31.32 – 31.36 Mb
PubMed search
- Wikidata
View/Edit Human	View/Edit Mouse

2-hydroxyacyl-CoA lyase 1 is a protein that in humans is encoded by the HACL1 gene. It produces a 2-Hydroxyphytanoyl-CoA lyase.

== Function ==
The product is a peroxisomal enzyme involved in the catabolism of phytanoic acid by α-oxidation. It requires thiamine diphosphate (ThDP) as cofactor.

The corresponding EC number is 4.1.2.63.
