= Phytanoyl-CoA dioxygenase =

Class of enzymes

phytanoyl-CoA dioxygenase
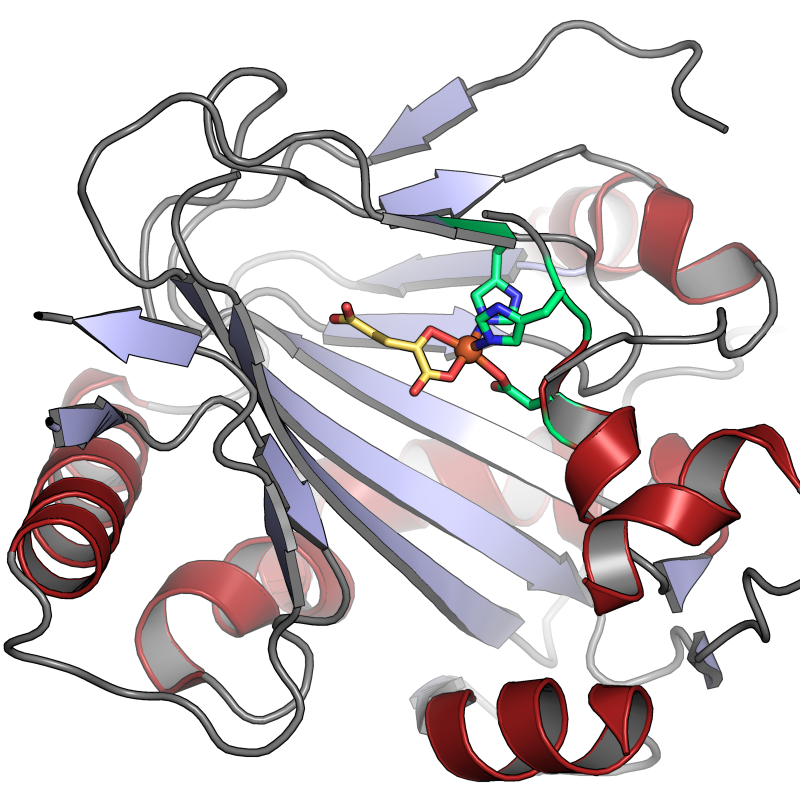
- The structure of human PAHX (PDB: 2A1X). The Fe(II) cofactor is shown as an orange sphere, coordinated by two histidine and one aspartate residues (shown in green) and by the 2-oxoglutarate cosubstrate (shown in yellow).

Identifiers
- EC no.: 1.14.11.18
- CAS no.: 185402-46-4

Databases
- BRENDA: enzyme data
- ExPASy: NiceZyme view
- KEGG: enzyme entry
- MetaCyc: metabolic pathway
- Rhea: reactions
- PDB structures: RCSB PDB PDBe PDBsum
- Gene Ontology: AmiGO / QuickGO
Search
- PMC: articles
- PubMed: articles
- NCBI: proteins

PHYH

Identifiers
- Aliases: PHYH, LN1, LNAP1, PAHX, PHYH1, RD, phytanoyl-CoA 2-hydroxylase
- External IDs: OMIM: 602026; MGI: 891978; GeneCards: PHYH
Available structures
PDB	Ortholog search: PDBe RCSB
PDB	List of PDB id codes 2A1X
Enzyme activity
EC #	BRENDA	ExPASy	KEGG	MetaCyc
1.14.11.18	↗	↗	↗	↗

Gene location (Human)
Chr.	Chromosome 10 (human)
Band	10p13	Start	13,277,796 bp
Band	10p13	End	13,302,412 bp

Gene location (Mouse)
Chr.	Chromosome 2 (mouse)
Band	2|2 A1	Start	4,923,830 bp
Band	2|2 A1	End	4,943,541 bp
RNA expression pattern
Bgee	Human / Mouse (ortholog); Top expressed in: vastus lateralis muscle; biceps brachii; Skeletal muscle tissue of biceps brachii; kidney tubule; Skeletal muscle tissue of rectus abdominis; amniotic fluid; muscle of thigh; body of tongue; gastrocnemius muscle; right ventricle / Top expressed in: lacrimal gland; seminal vesicula; left lobe of liver; epithelium of stomach; right kidney; parotid gland; myocardium of ventricle; mucous cell of stomach; extraocular muscle; human kidney; More reference expression data
BioGPS	n/a
Gene ontology
Molecular function	L-ascorbic acid binding; dioxygenase activity; protein binding; metal ion binding; oxidoreductase activity; catalytic activity; phytanoyl-CoA dioxygenase activity; ferrous iron binding; carboxylic acid binding
Cellular component	peroxisomal matrix; peroxisome; cytosol; mitochondrion
Biological process	methyl-branched fatty acid metabolic process; isoprenoid metabolic process; fatty acid metabolic process; fatty acid alpha-oxidation; 2-oxoglutarate metabolic process; protein targeting to peroxisome; 2-oxobutyrate catabolic process
Sources:Amigo / QuickGO
Orthologs
Databases	NCBI: entry; OMA: entry
Species	Human	Mouse
Entrez	5264	16922
Ensembl	ENSG00000107537	ENSMUSG00000026664
UniProt	O14832	O35386
RefSeq (mRNA)	NM_001037537; NM_006214; NM_001323080; NM_001323082; NM_001323083 NM_001323084	NM_010726
RefSeq (protein)	NP_001032626; NP_001310009; NP_001310011; NP_001310012; NP_001310013 NP_006205	NP_034856
Location (UCSC)	Chr 10: 13.28 – 13.3 Mb	Chr 2: 4.92 – 4.94 Mb
PubMed search
- Wikidata
View/Edit Human	View/Edit Mouse

In enzymology, a phytanoyl-CoA dioxygenase (EC 1.14.11.18) is an enzyme that catalyzes the chemical reaction

phytanoyl-CoA + 2-oxoglutarate + O_{2} $\rightleftharpoons$ 2-hydroxyphytanoyl-CoA + succinate + CO_{2}

The three substrates of this enzyme are phytanoyl-CoA, 2-oxoglutarate (2OG), and O_{2}, whereas its three products are 2-hydroxyphytanoyl-CoA, succinate, and CO_{2}.

This enzyme belongs to the family of iron(II)-dependent oxygenases, which typically incorporate one atom of dioxygen into the substrate and one atom into the succinate carboxylate group. The mechanism is complex, but is believed to involve ordered binding of 2-oxoglutarate to the iron(II) containing enzyme followed by substrate. Binding of substrate causes displacement of a water molecule from the iron(II) cofactor, leaving a vacant coordination position to which dioxygen binds. A rearrangement occurs to form a high energy iron-oxygen species (which is generally thought to be an iron(IV)=O species) that performs the actual oxidation reaction.

== Nomenclature ==
The systematic name of this enzyme class is phytanoyl-CoA, 2-oxoglutarate:oxygen oxidoreductase (2-hydroxylating). These enzymes are also called phytanoyl-CoA hydroxylases and phytanoyl-CoA alpha-hydroxylases.

== Examples ==
In humans, phytanoyl-CoA hydroxylase is encoded by the PHYH (aka PAHX) gene and is required for the alpha-oxidation of branched chain fatty acids (e.g. phytanic acid) in peroxisomes. PHYH deficiency results in the accumulation of large tissue stores of phytanic acid and is the major cause of Refsum disease.

== Related enzymes ==
Iron(II) and 2OG-dependent oxygenases are common in microorganisms, plants, and animals; the human genome is predicted to contain about 80 examples, and the model plant Arabidopsis thaliana likely contains more. In plants and microorganisms this enzyme family is associated with a large diversity of oxidative reactions.
