= ACSS3 =

Protein-coding gene in humans

Identifiers
- Aliases: ACSS3, acyl-CoA synthetase short-chain family member 3, acyl-CoA synthetase short chain family member 3
- External IDs: OMIM: 614356; MGI: 2685720; HomoloGene: 11587; GeneCards: ACSS3; OMA:ACSS3 - orthologs

Gene location (Human)
| Chr. | Chromosome 12 (human) |
| Band | 12q21.31 | Start | 80,936,414 bp |
| Band | 12q21.31 | End | 81,261,210 bp |

Gene location (Mouse)
| Chr. | Chromosome 10 (mouse) |
| Band | 10|10 D1 | Start | 106,769,378 bp |
| Band | 10|10 D1 | End | 106,959,529 bp |
RNA expression pattern
| Bgee | Human / Mouse (ortholog); Top expressed in: germinal epithelium; parotid gland; liver; Achilles tendon; corpus epididymis; left adrenal gland; right lobe of liver; caput epididymis; right adrenal cortex; left adrenal cortex / Top expressed in: white adipose tissue; otolith organ; utricle; brown adipose tissue; intercostal muscle; gastrula; mammary gland; subcutaneous adipose tissue; Epithelium of choroid plexus; olfactory epithelium; More reference expression data |
| BioGPS | n/a |
Gene ontology
| Molecular function | nucleotide binding; ligase activity; catalytic activity; ATP binding; acetate-CoA ligase activity |
| Cellular component | mitochondrion; mitochondrial matrix |
| Biological process | metabolism; ketone body biosynthetic process |
Sources:Amigo / QuickGO
Orthologs
| Species | Human | Mouse |
| Entrez | 79611 | 380660 |
| Ensembl | ENSG00000111058 | ENSMUSG00000035948 |
| UniProt | Q9H6R3 | Q14DH7 |
| RefSeq (mRNA) | NM_024560; NM_001330242; NM_001330243 | NM_001142804; NM_198636 |
| RefSeq (protein) | NP_001317171; NP_001317172; NP_078836 | NP_001136276; NP_941038 |
| Location (UCSC) | Chr 12: 80.94 – 81.26 Mb | Chr 10: 106.77 – 106.96 Mb |
| PubMed search |
- Wikidata
| View/Edit Human | View/Edit Mouse |

Acyl-CoA synthetase short-chain family member 3 is a protein that in humans is encoded by the ACSS3 gene.

== Function ==
ACSS3 is part of a family known as Acyl-CoA synthetases (ACSs), which catalyze the initial reaction in fatty acid metabolism. This reaction activates fatty acids via thioesterification to CoA, thereby allowing their participation in both anabolic and catabolic pathways. The existence of many ACSs suggests that each plays a unique role, directing the acyl-CoA product to a specific metabolic fate. Knowing the full complement of ACS genes in the human genome will facilitate future studies to characterize their specific biological functions.
