= Pristanic acid =

19-Carbon branched fatty acid

Names
- IUPAC name 2,6,10,14-tetramethylpentadecanoic acid

Identifiers
CAS Number	1189-37-3
3D model (JSmol)	Interactive image
ChEBI	CHEBI:51340
ChemSpider	110458
PubChem CID	123929
UNII	5FMQ2908AP
CompTox Dashboard (EPA)	DTXSID00862584
- InChI: InChI=1S/C19H38O2/c1-15(2)9-6-10-16(3)11-7-12-17(4)13-8-14-18(5)19(20)21/h15-18H,6-14H2,1-5H3,(H,20,21) Key: PAHGJZDQXIOYTH-UHFFFAOYSA-N; InChI=1/C19H38O2/c1-15(2)9-6-10-16(3)11-7-12-17(4)13-8-14-18(5)19(20)21/h15-18H,6-14H2,1-5H3,(H,20,21) Key: PAHGJZDQXIOYTH-UHFFFAOYAH
- SMILES: O=C(O)C(CCCC(CCCC(C)CCCC(C)C)C)C

Properties
Chemical formula	C_{19}H_{38}O_{2}
Molar mass	298.511 g·mol^{−1}
- Except where otherwise noted, data are given for materials in their standard state (at 25 °C [77 °F], 100 kPa). verify (what is ?) Infobox references

Pristanic acid (2,6,10,14-tetramethylpentadecanoic acid) is a branched-chain fatty acid and a terpenoid acid present at micromolar concentrations in the blood plasma of healthy individuals. It is also found in the lipids from many sources such as freshwater sponges, krill, earthworms, whales, human milk fat, bovine depot fat, butterfat, or Californian petroleum. It is usually present in combination with phytanic acid. In humans, pristanic acid is obtained from two sources: either directly from the diet or as the alpha oxidation product of phytanic acid. At physiological concentrations pristanic acid is a natural ligand for peroxisome proliferator-activated receptor alpha (PPARα). In liver, pristanic acid is degraded by peroxisomal beta oxidation to propionyl-CoA. Together with phytanic acid, pristanic acid accumulates in several inherited disorders such as Zellweger syndrome.

The salts and esters of pristanic acid are called pristanates.

Pristanic acid was first isolated from butterfat by R. P. Hansen and J. D. Morrison in 1964. The name of the substance is derived from pristane (2,6,10,14-tetramethylpentadecane), the corresponding hydrocarbon. Pristane was isolated from shark liver and was named after Latin pristis, "shark".

== See also ==
- Pristis, a genus of sawfish
