= SLC27A5 =

Protein-coding gene in the species Homo sapiens

Identifiers
- Aliases: SLC27A5, ACSB, ACSVL6, BACS, BAL, FACVL3, FATP-5, FATP5, VLACSR, VLCS-H2, VLCSH2, solute carrier family 27 member 5
- External IDs: OMIM: 603314; MGI: 1347100; GeneCards: SLC27A5
Enzyme activity
EC #	BRENDA	ExPASy	KEGG	MetaCyc
6.2.1.3	↗	↗	↗	↗
6.2.1.7	↗	↗	↗	↗

Gene location (Human)
Chr.	Chromosome 19 (human)
Band	19q13.43	Start	58,479,512 bp
Band	19q13.43	End	58,512,413 bp

Gene location (Mouse)
Chr.	Chromosome 7 (mouse)
Band	7|7 A1	Start	12,722,273 bp
Band	7|7 A1	End	12,732,119 bp
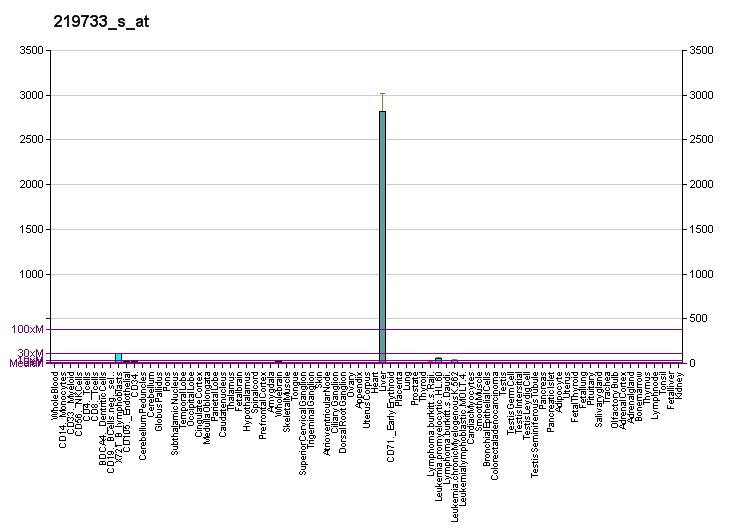
RNA expression pattern
Bgee	Human / Mouse (ortholog); Top expressed in: right lobe of liver; nucleus accumbens; anterior cingulate cortex; amygdala; caudate nucleus; putamen; left testis; right frontal lobe; right testis; C1 segment / Top expressed in: left lobe of liver; gallbladder; sexually immature organism; morula; embryo; yolk sac; blastocyst; duodenum; cerebellar cortex; medial head of gastrocnemius muscle; More reference expression data
BioGPS	More reference expression data
Gene ontology
Molecular function	nucleotide binding; fatty acid transmembrane transporter activity; cholate-CoA ligase activity; ligase activity; catalytic activity; very long-chain fatty acid-CoA ligase activity; ATP binding; long-chain fatty acid-CoA ligase activity; protein-containing complex binding; long-chain fatty acid transporter activity
Cellular component	integral component of membrane; endoplasmic reticulum membrane; membrane; intracellular membrane-bounded organelle; integral component of endoplasmic reticulum membrane; basal plasma membrane; endoplasmic reticulum; protein-containing complex
Biological process	lipid metabolism; very long-chain fatty acid metabolic process; fatty acid transport; fatty acid metabolic process; ketone body biosynthetic process; bile acid and bile salt transport; long-chain fatty acid import across plasma membrane; metabolism; long-chain fatty acid metabolic process; bile acid biosynthetic process; triglyceride mobilization; bile acid metabolic process
Sources:Amigo / QuickGO
Orthologs
Databases	NCBI: entry; OMA: entry
Species	Human	Mouse
Entrez	10998	26459
Ensembl	ENSG00000083807	ENSMUSG00000030382
UniProt	Q9Y2P5	Q4LDG0
RefSeq (mRNA)	NM_012254; NM_001321196	NM_009512
RefSeq (protein)	NP_001308125; NP_036386	NP_033538
Location (UCSC)	Chr 19: 58.48 – 58.51 Mb	Chr 7: 12.72 – 12.73 Mb
PubMed search
- Wikidata
View/Edit Human	View/Edit Mouse

Bile acyl-CoA synthetase is an enzyme that in humans is encoded by the SLC27A5 gene.

The protein encoded by this gene is an isozyme of very long-chain acyl-CoA synthetase (VLCS). It is capable of activating very long-chain fatty-acids containing 24- and 26-carbons. It is expressed in liver and associated with endoplasmic reticulum but not with peroxisomes. Its primary role is in fatty acid elongation or complex lipid synthesis rather than in degradation. This gene has a mouse ortholog.

== See also ==
- Solute carrier family
