= Acyl-CoA synthetase medium chain family member 2A =

Protein-coding gene in the species Homo sapiens

ACSM2A
Available structures
PDB	Ortholog search: PDBe RCSB
PDB	List of PDB id codes 2VZE, 2WD9, 3B7W, 3C5E, 3DAY, 3EQ6, 3GPC

Identifiers
- Aliases: ACSM2A, A-923A4.1, ACSM2, acyl-CoA synthetase medium-chain family member 2A, acyl-CoA synthetase medium chain family member 2A
- External IDs: OMIM: 614358; MGI: 2385289; HomoloGene: 70404; GeneCards: ACSM2A; OMA:ACSM2A - orthologs

Gene location (Human)
Chr.	Chromosome 16 (human)
Band	16p12.3	Start	20,451,461 bp
Band	16p12.3	End	20,487,669 bp

Gene location (Mouse)
Chr.	Chromosome 7 (mouse)
Band	7|7 F2	Start	119,153,563 bp
Band	7|7 F2	End	119,199,913 bp
RNA expression pattern
Bgee	Human / Mouse (ortholog); Top expressed in: right lobe of liver; renal cortex; metanephric glomerulus; human kidney; testicle; gonad; sural nerve; gastric mucosa; superior frontal gyrus; Achilles tendon / Top expressed in: right kidney; proximal tubule; human kidney; primary visual cortex; morula; muscle of thigh; hair follicle; zygote; superior frontal gyrus; renal corpuscle; More reference expression data
BioGPS	n/a
Gene ontology
Molecular function	nucleotide binding; ligase activity; catalytic activity; ATP binding; butyrate-CoA ligase activity; metal ion binding; fatty-acyl-CoA synthase activity; fatty acid ligase activity
Cellular component	mitochondrion; mitochondrial matrix
Biological process	medium-chain fatty-acyl-CoA metabolic process; metabolism; glucose homeostasis; fatty acid metabolic process; lipid metabolism; triglyceride homeostasis; fatty acid biosynthetic process; acyl-CoA metabolic process
Sources:Amigo / QuickGO
Orthologs
Species	Human	Mouse
Entrez	123876	233799
Ensembl	ENSG00000183747	ENSMUSG00000030945
UniProt	Q08AH3	Q8K0L3
RefSeq (mRNA)	NM_001010845; NM_001308169; NM_001308172; NM_001308954	NM_001177977; NM_001177978; NM_146197
RefSeq (protein)	NP_001295098; NP_001295101; NP_001295883	NP_001171448; NP_001171449; NP_666309
Location (UCSC)	Chr 16: 20.45 – 20.49 Mb	Chr 7: 119.15 – 119.2 Mb
PubMed search
- Wikidata
View/Edit Human	View/Edit Mouse

Acyl-CoA synthetase medium chain family member 2A is a protein that in humans is encoded by the ACSM2A gene.

== Function ==
This gene encodes a mitochondrial acyl-CoA synthetase that is specific for medium chain fatty acids. These enzymes catalyze fatty acid activation, the first step of fatty acid metabolism, through the transfer of acyl-CoA. These enzymes also participate in the glycine conjugation pathway in the detoxification of xenobiotics such as benzoate and ibuprofen. Expression levels of this gene in the kidney may be correlated with kidney function. This gene and its paralog ACSM2B (Gene ID: 348158), both present on chromosome 16, likely arose from a chromosomal duplication event. [provided by RefSeq, May 2017].
