= Benzoate—CoA ligase =

Class of enzymes

Identifiers
- EC no.: 6.2.1.25
- CAS no.: 95329-17-2

Databases
- IntEnz: IntEnz view
- BRENDA: BRENDA entry
- ExPASy: NiceZyme view
- KEGG: KEGG entry
- MetaCyc: metabolic pathway
- PRIAM: profile
- PDB structures: RCSB PDB PDBe PDBsum
- Gene Ontology: AmiGO / QuickGO
Search
- PMC: articles
- PubMed: articles
- NCBI: proteins

In enzymology, a benzoate—CoA ligase (EC 6.2.1.25) is an enzyme that catalyzes the chemical reaction

ATP + benzoate + CoA $\rightleftharpoons$ AMP + diphosphate + benzoyl-CoA

The 3 substrates of this enzyme are ATP, benzoate, and CoA, whereas its 3 products are AMP, diphosphate, and benzoyl-CoA.

This enzyme belongs to the family of ligases, specifically those forming carbon-sulfur bonds as acid-thiol ligases. The systematic name of this enzyme class is benzoate:CoA ligase (AMP-forming). Other names in common use include benzoate-coenzyme A ligase, benzoyl-coenzyme A synthetase, and benzoyl CoA synthetase (AMP forming). This enzyme participates in benzoate degradation via coa ligation.

== Structural studies ==
As of late 2007, only one structure has been solved for this class of enzymes, with the PDB accession code 2V7B.
