= Sigvald Bernhard Refsum =

Sigvald Bernhard Refsum (8 May 1907, Gransherred – 8 July 1991, Oslo) was a Norwegian neurologist and university teacher.

== Biography ==
Sigvald Refsum studied medicine at University of Oslo and obtained his doctorate in 1946. He taught in University of Bergen from 1951, then from 1954 until his retirement in 1978 in University of Oslo. Refsum disease is named after him.
