= SLC27A6 =

Protein-coding gene in the species Homo sapiens

Identifiers
- Aliases: SLC27A6, ACSVL2, FACVL2, FATP6, VLCS-H1, solute carrier family 27 member 6
- External IDs: OMIM: 604196; MGI: 3036230; GeneCards: SLC27A6
Enzyme activity
EC #	BRENDA	ExPASy	KEGG	MetaCyc
6.2.1.3	↗	↗	↗	↗
6.2.1.15	↗	↗	↗	↗

Gene location (Human)
Chr.	Chromosome 5 (human)
Band	5q23.3	Start	128,538,013 bp
Band	5q23.3	End	129,033,642 bp

Gene location (Mouse)
Chr.	Chromosome 18 (mouse)
Band	18|18 D3	Start	58,689,329 bp
Band	18|18 D3	End	58,745,845 bp
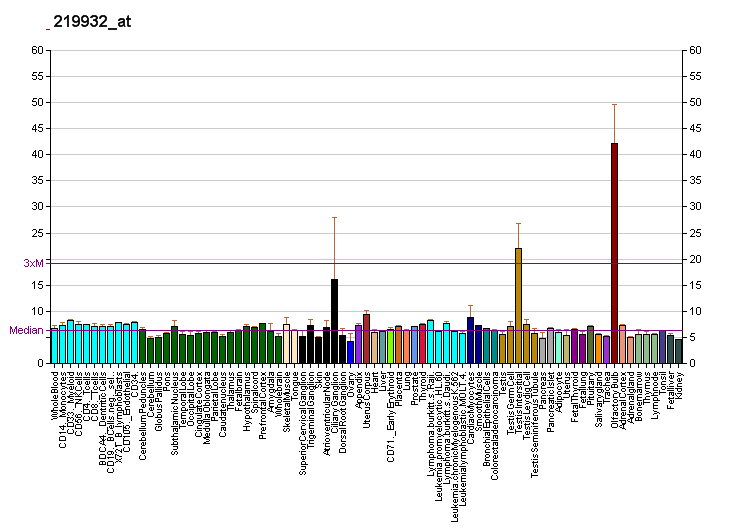
RNA expression pattern
Bgee	Human / Mouse (ortholog); Top expressed in: secondary oocyte; right uterine tube; apex of heart; left ventricle; right ventricle; myocardium; testicle; right adrenal cortex; hair follicle; right auricle of heart / Top expressed in: blastocyst; spermatocyte; lower respiratory tract; lung; lip; hair; placenta; ovary; zone of skin; testicle; More reference expression data
BioGPS	More reference expression data
Gene ontology
Molecular function	long-chain fatty acid-CoA ligase activity; nucleotide binding; very long-chain fatty acid-CoA ligase activity; catalytic activity; ligase activity; fatty acid transmembrane transporter activity; long-chain fatty acid transporter activity
Cellular component	integral component of membrane; plasma membrane; sarcolemma; membrane
Biological process	metabolism; very long-chain fatty acid metabolic process; lipid transport; fatty acid transport; fatty acid metabolic process; lipid metabolism; long-chain fatty acid transport; long-chain fatty acid metabolic process
Sources:Amigo / QuickGO
Orthologs
Databases	NCBI: entry; OMA: entry
Species	Human	Mouse
Entrez	28965	225579
Ensembl	ENSG00000113396	ENSMUSG00000024600
UniProt	Q9Y2P4	E9Q9W4
RefSeq (mRNA)	NM_001017372; NM_014031; NM_001317984	NM_001081072
RefSeq (protein)	NP_001017372; NP_001304913; NP_054750	NP_001074541
Location (UCSC)	Chr 5: 128.54 – 129.03 Mb	Chr 18: 58.69 – 58.75 Mb
PubMed search
- Wikidata
View/Edit Human	View/Edit Mouse

Long-chain fatty acid transport protein 6 is a protein that in humans is encoded by the SLC27A6 gene.

This gene encodes a member of the fatty acid transport protein family (FATP). FATPs are involved in the uptake of long-chain fatty acids and have unique expression patterns. Alternatively spliced transcript variants encoding the same protein have been found for this gene.

== See also ==
- Solute carrier family
