= AACS (gene) =

Identifiers
- Aliases: AACS, ACSF1, SUR-5, acetoacetyl-CoA synthetase
- External IDs: OMIM: 614364; MGI: 1926144; HomoloGene: 11322; GeneCards: AACS; OMA:AACS - orthologs

Gene location (Human)
Chr.	Chromosome 12 (human)
Band	12q24.31	Start	125,065,434 bp
Band	12q24.31	End	125,143,333 bp

Gene location (Mouse)
Chr.	Chromosome 5 (mouse)
Band	5|5 G1.1	Start	125,552,878 bp
Band	5|5 G1.1	End	125,594,474 bp
RNA expression pattern
Bgee	Human / Mouse (ortholog); Top expressed in: parotid gland; gingival epithelium; skin of arm; nipple; middle temporal gyrus; vulva; trachea; tibia; human penis; skin of thigh / Top expressed in: right kidney; tunica adventitia of aorta; granulocyte; proximal tubule; lumbar spinal ganglion; lip; brown adipose tissue; trachea; white adipose tissue; morula; More reference expression data
BioGPS	n/a
Gene ontology
Molecular function	nucleotide binding; butyrate-CoA ligase activity; ligase activity; protein binding; catalytic activity; ATP binding; acetoacetate-CoA ligase activity
Cellular component	cytoplasm; cytosol
Biological process	response to organic cyclic compound; response to nutrient; lipid metabolism; cellular response to testosterone stimulus; cellular response to cholesterol; fatty acid metabolic process; response to purine-containing compound; ketone body biosynthetic process; response to organonitrogen compound; response to starvation; white fat cell differentiation; liver development; adipose tissue development; metabolism; response to ethanol; cellular response to glucose stimulus; response to oleic acid; positive regulation of insulin secretion
Sources:Amigo / QuickGO
Orthologs
Species	Human	Mouse
Entrez	65985	78894
Ensembl	ENSG00000081760	ENSMUSG00000029482
UniProt	Q86V21	Q9D2R0
RefSeq (mRNA)	NM_023928; NM_001319839; NM_001319840	NM_030210
RefSeq (protein)	NP_001306768; NP_001306769; NP_076417	NP_084486
Location (UCSC)	Chr 12: 125.07 – 125.14 Mb	Chr 5: 125.55 – 125.59 Mb
PubMed search
- Wikidata
View/Edit Human	View/Edit Mouse

The acetoacetyl-CoA synthetase (AACS) gene encodes a protein of the same name, which converts acetoacetate to acetoacetyl-CoA, and plays a crucial role in ketone body utilization and fatty acid synthesis. The gene is found on human chromosome 12.

The AACS protein is a member of the acyl-CoA synthetase family and is involved in cellular energy production, ketogenesis, and cholesterol synthesis. It is expressed in a wide range of human tissues.

== Function ==
The protein's function is regulated transcriptionally by sterol regulatory element-binding protein (SREBP) and peroxisome proliferator-activated receptor gamma (PPARγ).
