= Acetoacetate—CoA ligase =

Class of enzymes

Identifiers
- EC no.: 6.2.1.16
- CAS no.: 39394-62-2

Databases
- IntEnz: IntEnz view
- BRENDA: BRENDA entry
- ExPASy: NiceZyme view
- KEGG: KEGG entry
- MetaCyc: metabolic pathway
- PRIAM: profile
- PDB structures: RCSB PDB PDBe PDBsum
- Gene Ontology: AmiGO / QuickGO
Search
- PMC: articles
- PubMed: articles
- NCBI: proteins

In enzymology, an acetoacetate—CoA ligase (EC 6.2.1.16) is an enzyme that catalyzes the chemical reaction

ATP + acetoacetate + CoA $\rightleftharpoons$ AMP + diphosphate + acetoacetyl-CoA

The 3 substrates of this enzyme are ATP, acetoacetate, and CoA, whereas its 3 products are AMP, diphosphate, and acetoacetyl-CoA.

This enzyme belongs to the family of ligases, specifically those forming carbon-sulfur bonds as acid-thiol ligases. The systematic name of this enzyme class is acetoacetate:CoA ligase (AMP-forming). This enzyme is also called acetoacetyl-CoA synthetase. This enzyme participates in butanoate metabolism.
