= 13-Methyltetradecanoic acid =

15-Carbon branched fatty acid

Names
- Preferred IUPAC name 13-Methyltetradecanoic acid
- Other names 13-Methylmyristic acid

Identifiers
CAS Number	2485-71-4
3D model (JSmol)	Interactive image
ChEBI	CHEBI:39250
ChEMBL	ChEMBL495851
ChemSpider	133106
ECHA InfoCard	100.164.501
EC Number	636-731-2
PubChem CID	151014
UNII	M09T9M1LTY
CompTox Dashboard (EPA)	DTXSID90179552
- InChI: InChI=1S/C15H30O2/c1-14(2)12-10-8-6-4-3-5-7-9-11-13-15(16)17/h14H,3-13H2,1-2H3,(H,16,17) Key: ZOCYQVNGROEVLU-UHFFFAOYSA-N; InChI=1/C15H30O2/c1-14(2)12-10-8-6-4-3-5-7-9-11-13-15(16)17/h14H,3-13H2,1-2H3,(H,16,17) Key: ZOCYQVNGROEVLU-UHFFFAOYAB
- SMILES: CC(C)CCCCCCCCCCCC(=O)O

Properties
Chemical formula	C_{15}H_{30}O_{2}
Molar mass	242.403 g·mol^{−1}

Hazards
- GHS labelling
Pictograms	(GHS07: Exclamation mark)
Signal word	Warning
Hazard statements	H315, H319, H335, H413
Precautionary statements	P261, P264, P271, P273, P280, P302+P352, P304+P340, P305+P351+P338, P312, P321, P332+P313, P337+P313, P362, P403+P233, P405, P501
- Except where otherwise noted, data are given for materials in their standard state (at 25 °C [77 °F], 100 kPa). Infobox references

13-Methyltetradecanoic acid, also known as isopentadecanoic acid (or iso-C15:0), is a 15-carbon branched-chain saturated fatty acid with the chemical formula C_{15}H_{30}O_{2} and a molecular weight of 242.4 g/mol. Isopentadecanoic acid is classified as a long-chain fatty acid, a branched-chain saturated fatty acid, and a methyl-branched fatty acid.

Isopentadecanoic acid has been shown to induce apoptotic cell death and inhibition of tumor growth in human bladder cancer cells. For these reasons, it has been considered a potential chemotherapeutic supplement.
