= ACSBG2 =

Protein-coding gene in the species Homo sapiens

Identifiers
- Aliases: ACSBG2, BGR, BRGL, PRTD-NY3, PRTDNY3, acyl-CoA synthetase bubblegum family member 2
- External IDs: OMIM: 614363; MGI: 3587728; HomoloGene: 57133; GeneCards: ACSBG2; OMA:ACSBG2 - orthologs

Gene location (Human)
Chr.	Chromosome 19 (human)
Band	19p13.3	Start	6,135,247 bp
Band	19p13.3	End	6,193,094 bp

Gene location (Mouse)
Chr.	Chromosome 17 (mouse)
Band	17|17 D	Start	57,150,103 bp
Band	17|17 D	End	57,181,447 bp
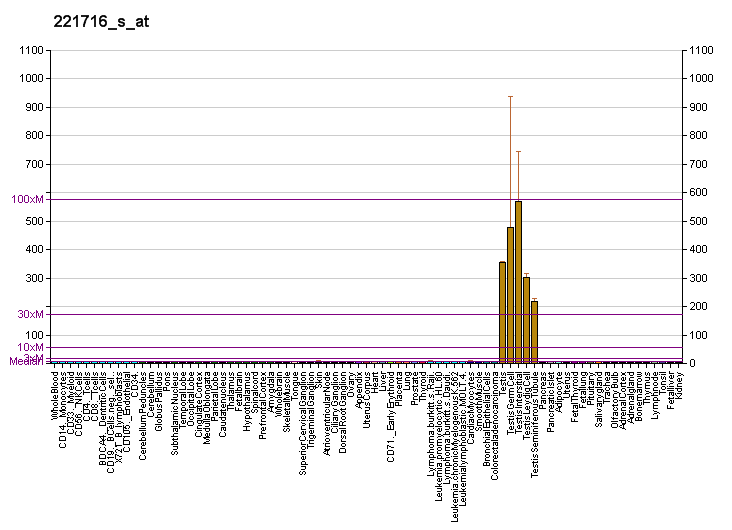
RNA expression pattern
Bgee	Human / Mouse (ortholog); Top expressed in: sperm; left testis; right testis; testicle; gonad; cerebellar hemisphere; right hemisphere of cerebellum; right coronary artery; left uterine tube; human kidney / Top expressed in: seminiferous tubule; spermatid; spermatocyte; morula; blastocyst; adrenal gland; pancreas; islet of Langerhans; More reference expression data
BioGPS	More reference expression data
Gene ontology
Molecular function	long-chain fatty acid-CoA ligase activity; nucleotide binding; acyl-CoA hydrolase activity; ligase activity; ATP binding; catalytic activity; very long-chain fatty acid-CoA ligase activity; decanoate-CoA ligase activity
Cellular component	cytoplasm; mitochondrion; membrane; cytosol
Biological process	multicellular organism development; cell differentiation; metabolism; long-chain fatty-acyl-CoA biosynthetic process; spermatogenesis; fatty acid metabolic process; lipid metabolism; long-chain fatty acid metabolic process
Sources:Amigo / QuickGO
Orthologs
Species	Human	Mouse
Entrez	81616	328845
Ensembl	ENSG00000130377	ENSMUSG00000024207
UniProt	Q5FVE4	Q2XU92
RefSeq (mRNA)	NM_001289177; NM_001289178; NM_001289179; NM_001289180; NM_030924 NM_001321384	NM_001039114
RefSeq (protein)	NP_001276106; NP_001276107; NP_001276108; NP_001276109; NP_001308313 NP_112186	NP_001034203
Location (UCSC)	Chr 19: 6.14 – 6.19 Mb	Chr 17: 57.15 – 57.18 Mb
PubMed search
- Wikidata
View/Edit Human	View/Edit Mouse

Long-chain-fatty-acid—CoA ligase ACSBG2 is an enzyme that in humans is encoded by the ACSBG2 gene.
