= Cholate—CoA ligase =

Class of enzymes

Identifiers
- EC no.: 6.2.1.7
- CAS no.: 9027-90-1

Databases
- IntEnz: IntEnz view
- BRENDA: BRENDA entry
- ExPASy: NiceZyme view
- KEGG: KEGG entry
- MetaCyc: metabolic pathway
- PRIAM: profile
- PDB structures: RCSB PDB PDBe PDBsum
Search
- PMC: articles
- PubMed: articles
- NCBI: proteins

Cholate—CoA ligase (EC 6.2.1.7, BAL, bile acid CoA ligase, bile acid coenzyme A ligase, choloyl-CoA synthetase, choloyl coenzyme A synthetase, cholic thiokinase, cholate thiokinase, cholic acid:CoA ligase, 3alpha,7alpha,12alpha-trihydroxy-5beta-cholestanoyl coenzyme A synthetase, 3alpha,7alpha,12alpha-trihydroxy-5beta-cholestanoate-CoA ligase, 3alpha,7alpha,12alpha-trihydroxy-5beta-cholestanoate-CoA synthetase, THCA-CoA ligase, 3alpha,7alpha,12alpha-trihydroxy-5beta-cholestanate—CoA ligase, 3alpha,7alpha,12alpha-trihydroxy-5beta-cholestanate:CoA ligase (AMP-forming), cholyl-CoA synthetase, trihydroxycoprostanoyl-CoA synthetase) is an enzyme with systematic name cholate:CoA ligase (AMP-forming). This enzyme catalyses the following chemical reaction

(1) ATP + cholate + CoA $\rightleftharpoons$ AMP + diphosphate + choloyl-CoA
(2) ATP + (25R)-3alpha,7alpha,12alpha-trihydroxy-5beta-cholestan-26-oate + CoA $\rightleftharpoons$ AMP + diphosphate + (25R)-3alpha,7alpha,12alpha-trihydroxy-5beta-cholestanoyl-CoA

This enzyme requires Mg^{2+} for activity.
