= SLC27A3 =

Protein-coding gene in humans

Identifiers
- Aliases: SLC27A3, ACSVL3, FATP3, VLCS-3, solute carrier family 27 member 3
- External IDs: OMIM: 604193; MGI: 1347358; GeneCards: SLC27A3
Enzyme activity
EC #	BRENDA	ExPASy	KEGG	MetaCyc
6.2.1.3	↗	↗	↗	↗
6.2.1.15	↗	↗	↗	↗

Gene location (Human)
Chr.	Chromosome 1 (human)
Band	1q21.3	Start	153,774,354 bp
Band	1q21.3	End	153,780,157 bp

Gene location (Mouse)
Chr.	Chromosome 3 (mouse)
Band	3|3 F1	Start	90,292,546 bp
Band	3|3 F1	End	90,297,245 bp
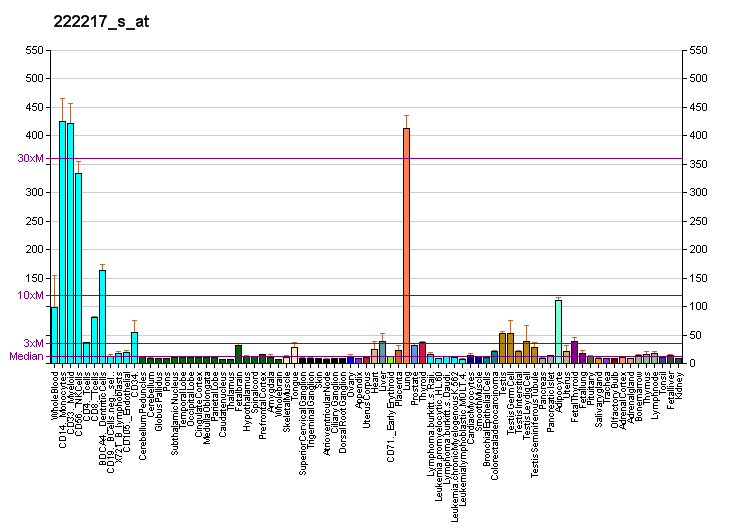
RNA expression pattern
Bgee	Human / Mouse (ortholog); Top expressed in: granulocyte; Descending thoracic aorta; ascending aorta; right lung; gastric mucosa; right coronary artery; subcutaneous adipose tissue; upper lobe of left lung; left coronary artery; monocyte / Top expressed in: yolk sac; adrenal gland; lip; renal corpuscle; otic vesicle; embryo; urethra; tail of embryo; embryo; spermatocyte; More reference expression data
BioGPS	More reference expression data
Gene ontology
Molecular function	long-chain fatty acid-CoA ligase activity; nucleotide binding; ligase activity; catalytic activity; very long-chain fatty acid-CoA ligase activity; long-chain fatty acid transporter activity; ATP binding
Cellular component	integral component of membrane; membrane; mitochondrial membranes; mitochondrion; endoplasmic reticulum
Biological process	metabolism; long-chain fatty acid metabolic process; fatty acid metabolic process; lipid metabolism; long-chain fatty acid transport
Sources:Amigo / QuickGO
Orthologs
Databases	NCBI: entry; OMA: entry
Species	Human	Mouse
Entrez	11000	26568
Ensembl	ENSG00000263163; ENSG00000143554	ENSMUSG00000027932
UniProt	Q5K4L6	O88561
RefSeq (mRNA)	NM_024330; NM_001317929	NM_011988; NM_001316688
RefSeq (protein)	NP_001304858; NP_077306	NP_001303617; NP_036118
Location (UCSC)	Chr 1: 153.77 – 153.78 Mb	Chr 3: 90.29 – 90.3 Mb
PubMed search
- Wikidata
View/Edit Human	View/Edit Mouse

Long-chain fatty acid transport protein 3 is a protein that in humans is encoded by the SLC27A3 gene.

In melanocytic cells SLC27A3 gene expression may be regulated by MITF.

== See also ==
- SLC27A3+protein,+human at the U.S. National Library of Medicine Medical Subject Headings (MeSH)
- Solute carrier family
