= ACSM3 =

Protein-coding gene in the species Homo sapiens

Identifiers
- Aliases: ACSM3, SA, SAH, acyl-CoA synthetase medium-chain family member 3, acyl-CoA synthetase medium chain family member 3
- External IDs: OMIM: 145505; MGI: 99538; HomoloGene: 74559; GeneCards: ACSM3; OMA:ACSM3 - orthologs

Gene location (Human)
Chr.	Chromosome 16 (human)
Band	16p12.3	Start	20,610,243 bp
Band	16p12.3	End	20,797,581 bp

Gene location (Mouse)
Chr.	Chromosome 7 (mouse)
Band	7|7 F2	Start	119,360,146 bp
Band	7|7 F2	End	119,386,736 bp
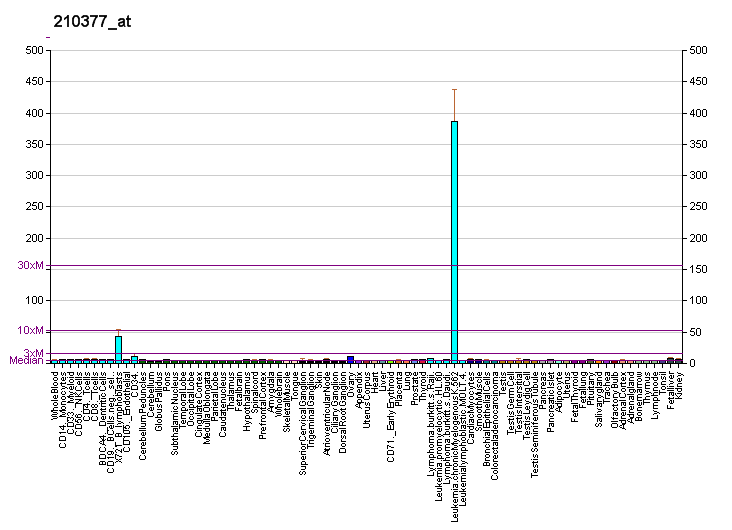

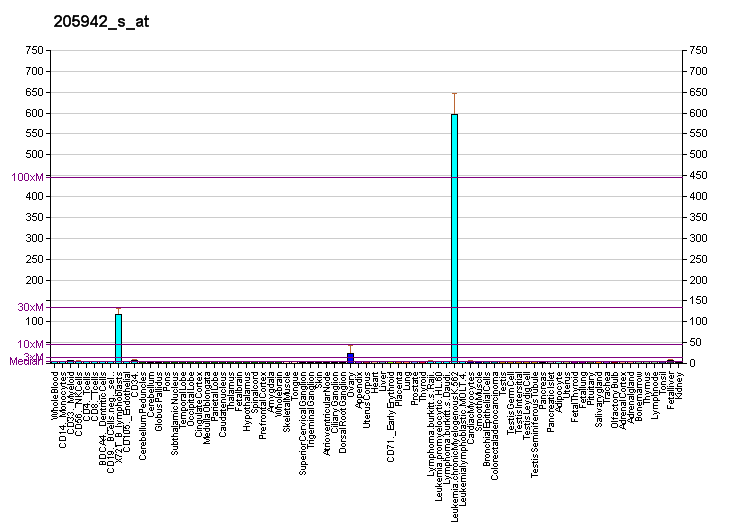
RNA expression pattern
Bgee	Human / Mouse (ortholog); Top expressed in: left ovary; right ovary; right lobe of liver; left uterine tube; body of pancreas; right uterine tube; mucosa of transverse colon; body of uterus; human kidney; body of stomach / Top expressed in: right kidney; left colon; tunica adventitia of aorta; proximal tubule; left lobe of liver; human kidney; mucous cell of stomach; intercostal muscle; pyloric antrum; brown adipose tissue; More reference expression data
BioGPS	More reference expression data
Gene ontology
Molecular function	nucleotide binding; ligase activity; catalytic activity; ATP binding; metal ion binding; fatty-acyl-CoA synthase activity; fatty acid ligase activity; butyrate-CoA ligase activity; molecular function
Cellular component	mitochondrion; mitochondrial matrix; cellular component
Biological process	regulation of blood pressure; cholesterol homeostasis; metabolism; lipid metabolism; fatty acid metabolic process; fatty acid biosynthetic process; acyl-CoA metabolic process
Sources:Amigo / QuickGO
Orthologs
Species	Human	Mouse
Entrez	6296	20216
Ensembl	ENSG00000005187	ENSMUSG00000030935
UniProt	Q53FZ2	Q3UNX5
RefSeq (mRNA)	NM_005622; NM_202000	NM_016870; NM_212441; NM_212442
RefSeq (protein)	NP_005613; NP_973729	NP_058566; NP_997606; NP_997607
Location (UCSC)	Chr 16: 20.61 – 20.8 Mb	Chr 7: 119.36 – 119.39 Mb
PubMed search
- Wikidata
View/Edit Human	View/Edit Mouse

Acyl-CoA synthetase medium-chain family member 3 (ACSM3) is a mitochondrial enzyme that in humans is encoded by the ACSM3 gene.
