= ACSM2B =

Protein-coding gene in the species Homo sapiens

Identifiers
- Aliases: ACSM2B, ACSM2, HXMA, HYST1046, acyl-CoA synthetase medium-chain family member 2B, acyl-CoA synthetase medium chain family member 2B
- External IDs: OMIM: 614359; MGI: 2385289; GeneCards: ACSM2B
Enzyme activity
| EC # | BRENDA | ExPASy | KEGG | MetaCyc |
|---|---|---|---|---|
| 6.2.1.2 | ↗ | ↗ | ↗ | ↗ |
| 6.2.1.25 | ↗ | ↗ | ↗ | ↗ |

Gene location (Human)
| Chr. | Chromosome 16 (human) |
| Band | 16p12.3 | Start | 20,536,226 bp |
| Band | 16p12.3 | End | 20,576,427 bp |

Gene location (Mouse)
| Chr. | Chromosome 7 (mouse) |
| Band | 7|7 F2 | Start | 119,153,563 bp |
| Band | 7|7 F2 | End | 119,199,913 bp |
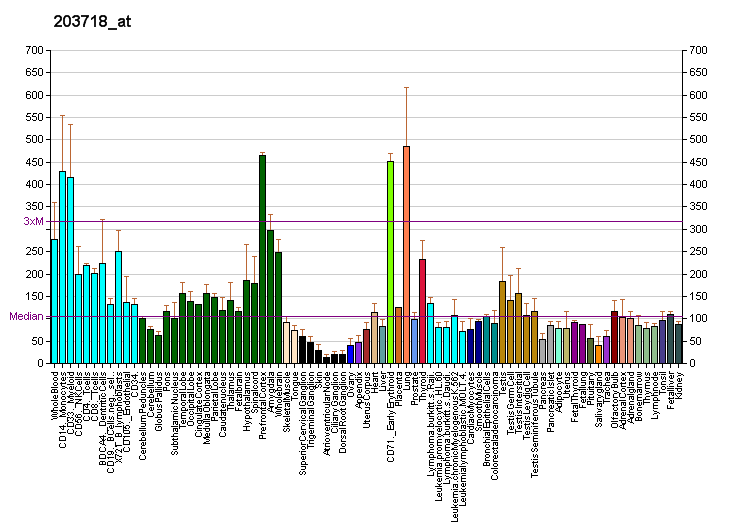
RNA expression pattern
| Bgee | Human / Mouse (ortholog); Top expressed in: right lobe of liver; renal cortex; human kidney; testicle; gonad; epithelium of colon; sural nerve; left uterine tube; renal medulla; muscle of thigh / Top expressed in: right kidney; proximal tubule; human kidney; primary visual cortex; morula; muscle of thigh; hair follicle; zygote; superior frontal gyrus; renal corpuscle; More reference expression data |
| BioGPS | More reference expression data |
Gene ontology
| Molecular function | nucleotide binding; ligase activity; catalytic activity; ATP binding; metal ion binding; butyrate-CoA ligase activity; CoA-ligase activity; fatty-acyl-CoA synthase activity; fatty acid ligase activity; molecular function |
| Cellular component | mitochondrion; mitochondrial matrix |
| Biological process | xenobiotic metabolic process; metabolism; fatty acid metabolic process; lipid metabolism; fatty acid biosynthetic process; acyl-CoA metabolic process |
Sources:Amigo / QuickGO
Orthologs
| Databases | NCBI: entry; OMA: entry |
| Species | Human | Mouse |
| Entrez | 348158 | 233799 |
| Ensembl | ENSG00000066813 | ENSMUSG00000030945 |
| UniProt | Q68CK6 | Q8K0L3 |
| RefSeq (mRNA) | NM_001105069; NM_182617 | NM_001177977; NM_001177978; NM_146197 |
| RefSeq (protein) | NP_001098539; NP_872423 | NP_001171448; NP_001171449; NP_666309 |
| Location (UCSC) | Chr 16: 20.54 – 20.58 Mb | Chr 7: 119.15 – 119.2 Mb |
| PubMed search |
- Wikidata
| View/Edit Human | View/Edit Mouse |

Acyl-CoA synthetase medium-chain family member 2B (ACSM2B) is a mitochondrial enzyme that in humans is encoded by the ACSM2B gene.
