= Long-chain fatty acid transport protein 1 =

Protein-coding gene in the species Homo sapiens

SLC27A1

Identifiers
- Aliases: SLC27A1, ACSVL5, FATP, FATP1, FATP-1, solute carrier family 27 member 1
- External IDs: OMIM: 600691; MGI: 1347098; GeneCards: SLC27A1
Enzyme activity
EC #	BRENDA	ExPASy	KEGG	MetaCyc
6.2.1.3	↗	↗	↗	↗
6.2.1.15	↗	↗	↗	↗

Gene location (Human)
Chr.	Chromosome 19 (human)
Band	19p13.11	Start	17,468,769 bp
Band	19p13.11	End	17,506,168 bp

Gene location (Mouse)
Chr.	Chromosome 8 (mouse)
Band	8|8 B3.3	Start	71,568,882 bp
Band	8|8 B3.3	End	71,587,302 bp
RNA expression pattern
Bgee	Human / Mouse (ortholog); Top expressed in: apex of heart; pancreatic ductal cell; right hemisphere of cerebellum; muscle of thigh; left ovary; sural nerve; right ovary; C1 segment; right adrenal cortex; myocardium of left ventricle / Top expressed in: neural layer of retina; muscle of thigh; superior frontal gyrus; choroid plexus of fourth ventricle; lip; white adipose tissue; primary visual cortex; ventricular zone; subcutaneous adipose tissue; phalanx of third toe; More reference expression data
BioGPS	n/a
Gene ontology
Molecular function	long-chain fatty acid-CoA ligase activity; nucleotide binding; protein homodimerization activity; ligase activity; catalytic activity; very long-chain fatty acid-CoA ligase activity; fatty acid transmembrane transporter activity; long-chain fatty acid transporter activity; protein binding
Cellular component	cytoplasm; integral component of membrane; membrane; plasma membrane; endoplasmic reticulum; endomembrane system; mitochondrion; mitochondrial inner membrane; cytosol; integral component of plasma membrane
Biological process	phosphatidic acid biosynthetic process; phosphatidylserine biosynthetic process; lipid transport; lipid metabolism; medium-chain fatty acid transport; phosphatidylglycerol biosynthetic process; fatty acid transport; phosphatidylethanolamine biosynthetic process; adiponectin-activated signaling pathway; fatty acid metabolic process; positive regulation of protein serine/threonine kinase activity; response to insulin; negative regulation of phospholipid biosynthetic process; positive regulation of heat generation; cardiolipin biosynthetic process; phosphatidylinositol biosynthetic process; response to cold; phosphatidylcholine biosynthetic process; metabolism; long-chain fatty acid metabolic process; long-chain fatty acid transport; regulation of lipid metabolic process; transport; positive regulation of triglyceride biosynthetic process; long-chain fatty acid import into cell
Sources:Amigo / QuickGO
Orthologs
Databases	NCBI: entry; OMA: entry
Species	Human	Mouse
Entrez	376497	26457
Ensembl	ENSG00000130304	ENSMUSG00000031808
UniProt	Q6PCB7	Q60714
RefSeq (mRNA)	NM_198580	NM_011977; NM_001357180; NM_001357181; NM_001357182
RefSeq (protein)	NP_940982	NP_036107; NP_001344109; NP_001344110; NP_001344111
Location (UCSC)	Chr 19: 17.47 – 17.51 Mb	Chr 8: 71.57 – 71.59 Mb
PubMed search
- Wikidata
View/Edit Human	View/Edit Mouse

Long-chain fatty acid transport protein 1 (FATP1) is a protein that in humans is encoded by the SLC27A1 gene.

== Structure ==
The SLC27A1 gene is located on the 19th chromosome, with its specific location being 19p13.11. The gene contains 15 exons. SLC27A1 encodes a 71.1 kDa protein that is composed of 646 amino acids; 26 peptides have been observed through mass spectrometry data.

== See also ==
- SLC27A1+protein,+human at the U.S. National Library of Medicine Medical Subject Headings (MeSH)
- Solute carrier family
