= Branched-chain fatty acid =

Chemical structures of 13-methyltetradecanoic acid (top) and 12-methyltetradecanoic acid, two branched chain fatty acids found in bacteria

Branched-chain fatty acids (BCFA) are usually saturated fatty acids with one or more methyl branches on the carbon chain. BCFAs are most often found in bacteria, but can be found in nattō, dairy, vernix caseosa of human infants and California sea lions where they may play a role in fostering the development of their intestinal microbiota. Another waxy animal material containing BCFAs is lanolin.

Branched chain fatty acids are considered to be responsible for the smell of mutton and higher content causes consumers to dislike the smell of lamb meat. Branched-chain fatty acids are synthesized by the branch-chain fatty acid synthesizing system.

Plants and specialised metabolites. Branched-chain fatty-acid biosynthesis also occurs in plants. In several plant lineages (notably Solanaceae and Capsicum spp.) branched-chain acyl groups derived from valine, leucine or isoleucine are incorporated into specialised metabolites such as acyl sugars and capsaicinoids; transcriptomic, biochemical and reverse-genetics studies have identified the relevant branched-chain keto-acid / branched-chain acyl-CoA enzymatic steps and plant genes required for production of these branched-chain acyl donors in glandular trichomes and in the placenta of Capsicum fruits.

== See also ==
- List of saturated branched-chain fatty acids
