= Long-chain fatty acid transport protein 4 =

Protein-coding gene in the species Homo sapiens

SLC27A4

Identifiers
- Aliases: SLC27A4, ACSVL4, FATP4, IPS, solute carrier family 27 member 4
- External IDs: OMIM: 604194; MGI: 1347347; GeneCards: SLC27A4
Enzyme activity
EC #	BRENDA	ExPASy	KEGG	MetaCyc
6.2.1.3	↗	↗	↗	↗
6.2.1.15	↗	↗	↗	↗

Gene location (Human)
Chr.	Chromosome 9 (human)
Band	9q34.11	Start	128,340,527 bp
Band	9q34.11	End	128,361,470 bp

Gene location (Mouse)
Chr.	Chromosome 2 (mouse)
Band	2 B|2 20.64 cM	Start	29,692,646 bp
Band	2 B|2 20.64 cM	End	29,707,534 bp
RNA expression pattern
Bgee	Human / Mouse (ortholog); Top expressed in: mucosa of transverse colon; jejunal mucosa; duodenum; skin of arm; mucosa of ileum; prefrontal cortex; right frontal lobe; skin of leg; Brodmann area 9; hypothalamus / Top expressed in: lip; granulocyte; jejunum; duodenum; ileum; skin of external ear; esophagus; pontine nuclei; skin of abdomen; medial dorsal nucleus; More reference expression data
BioGPS	n/a
Gene ontology
Molecular function	long-chain fatty acid-CoA ligase activity; nucleotide binding; fatty acid transmembrane transporter activity; ligase activity; catalytic activity; very long-chain fatty acid-CoA ligase activity; long-chain fatty acid transporter activity
Cellular component	integral component of membrane; endoplasmic reticulum membrane; membrane; plasma membrane; microvillus; brush border membrane; endoplasmic reticulum
Biological process	lipid transport; response to nutrient; lipid metabolism; medium-chain fatty acid transport; very long-chain fatty acid metabolic process; fatty acid transport; fatty acid metabolic process; long-chain fatty acid import into cell; very long-chain fatty acid catabolic process; metabolism; long-chain fatty acid metabolic process; skin development; long-chain fatty acid transport; transport
Sources:Amigo / QuickGO
Orthologs
Databases	NCBI: entry; OMA: entry
Species	Human	Mouse
Entrez	10999	26569
Ensembl	ENSG00000167114	ENSMUSG00000059316
UniProt	Q6P1M0	Q91VE0
RefSeq (mRNA)	NM_005094	NM_011989
RefSeq (protein)	NP_005085; NP_005085.2	NP_036119
Location (UCSC)	Chr 9: 128.34 – 128.36 Mb	Chr 2: 29.69 – 29.71 Mb
PubMed search
- Wikidata
View/Edit Human	View/Edit Mouse

Long-chain fatty acid transport protein 4 is a protein that in humans is encoded by the SLC27A4 gene. This membrane protein is also called FATP4 or ACSVL5 (very long chain fatty acyl-CoA synthetase 5). The purified protein shows enzyme activity (EC 6.2.1.3), esterifying long and very long chain fatty acids with Coenzyme A. It is debated whether it is also a fatty acid transporter at the plasma membrane.

== See also ==
- Solute carrier family
