= Refsum disease =

Neurological condition

- Other names: Adult Refsum disease, heredopathia atactica polyneuritiformis, phytanic acid oxidase deficiency, and phytanic acid storage disease
- Phytanic acid
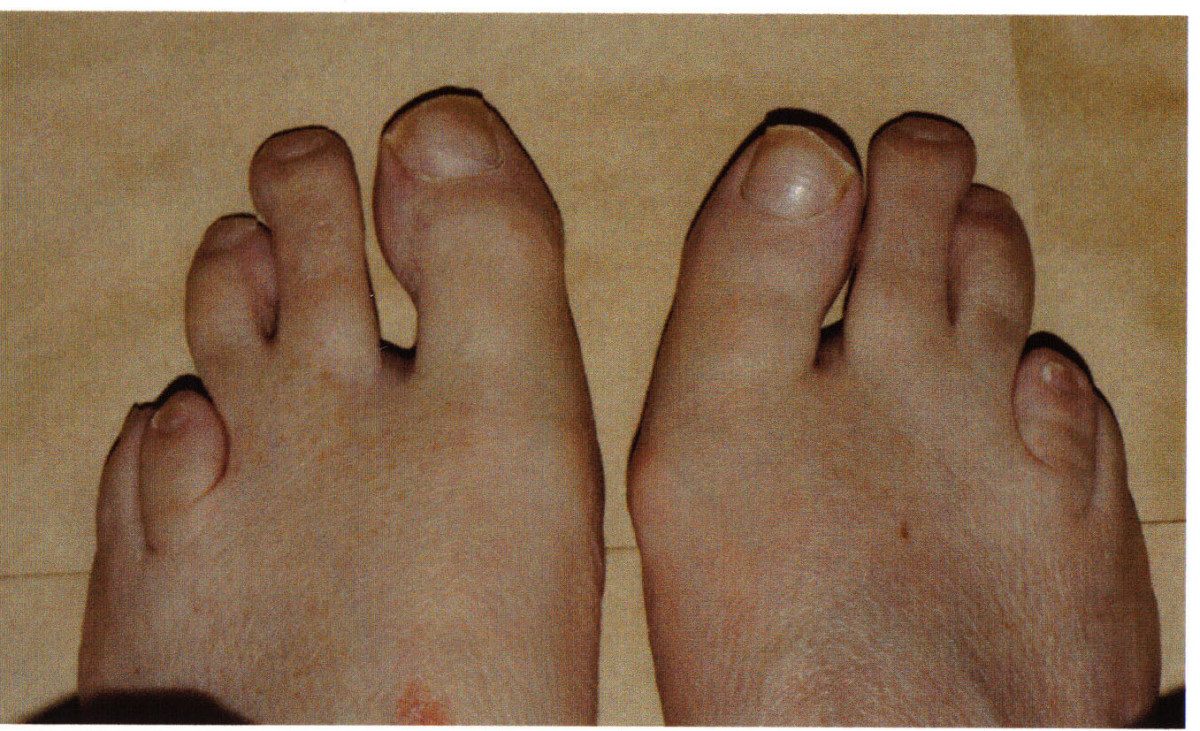
- Feet of a patient with Refsum disease.
- Specialty: Medical genetics, neurology
- Symptoms: Ichthyosis, Muscle weakness, Anosmia, Eye problems, Cerebellar ataxia
- Causes: Buildup of phytanic acid in the body due to genetic mutations
- Treatment: Phytanic-acid-restricted diet, Plasmapheresis

Refsum disease is an autosomal recessive neurological disease that results in the over-accumulation of phytanic acid in cells and tissues. It is one of several disorders named after Norwegian neurologist Sigvald Bernhard Refsum (1907–1991). Refsum disease typically begins to show symptoms during adolescence, although symptoms may first appear anywhere between infancy and old age. Refsum disease is definitively diagnosed by lab tests showing above average serum levels of phytanic acid, or through genetic testing.

== Signs and symptoms ==
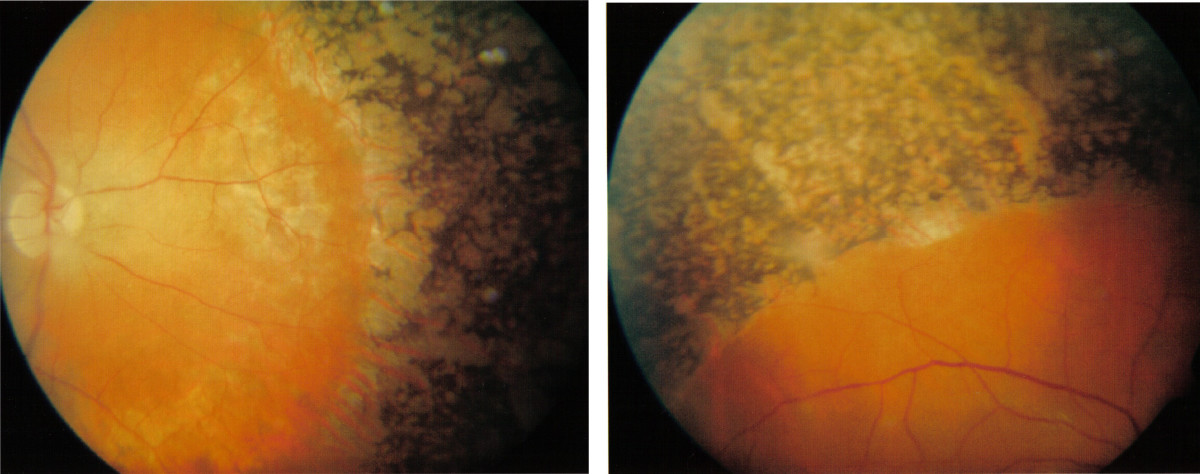
Fundi of a patient with Refsum disease.

Individuals with Refsum disease present with neurologic damage, cerebellar degeneration, and peripheral neuropathy. Most cases are symmetric (affecting the left and right sides of the body equally) and feature both motor and sensory nerve deficits with similar time of onset and rate of disease progression. Onset is most commonly in childhood or adolescence with a progressive course, although periods of stagnation or remission do occur. Rarely, symptoms may not appear until adulthood. Common symptoms include dry, scaly skin; difficulty hearing; variable (but typically significant) muscle weakness; anosmia, which is the loss of sense of smell; and eye problems, including retinitis pigmentosa, cataracts, and night blindness. Cerebellar ataxia is also common but usually presents later in life than other symptoms. In 80 percent of patients diagnosed with Refsum disease, sensorineural hearing loss has been reported. This is hearing loss as the result of damage to the inner ear or the nerve connecting ear to the brain.

Approximately 30% of patients with Refsum disease are known to have congenital malformations of bones. The metatarsal and metacarpal bones are the most commonly affected, often being shorter than normal. In theory, this might be the earliest observable symptom of Refsum disease, but such abnormalities are often nonspecific or too minor to be noticed.

Rarely, patients with Refsum disease may develop a cardiac arrhythmia. There is evidence that the risk of cardiac problems may increase following an infection or catecholamine-related illness, but this is not firmly established.

== Cause ==
Refsum disease is a peroxisomal disorder caused by the impaired alpha-oxidation of branched chain fatty acids resulting in buildup of phytanic acid and its derivatives in the plasma and tissues. This may be due to deficiencies of phytanoyl-CoA hydroxylase or peroxin-7 activity, encoded by the genes PHYH and PEX7, respectively. In at least 90% of cases, Refsum disease is caused by PHYH mutations.

PEX7 gene mutations can interrupt the peroxisomal transport of proteins as this gene codes for the peroxin-7 protein receptor. These mutations in the PEX7 gene generally lead to rhizomelic chondrodysplasia punctata type 1, which impairs development of many parts of the body. Refsum disease is inherited in an autosomal recessive pattern, meaning that it requires both copies of the mutation to inherit the disease.

== Diagnosis ==
Histopathologic examination of the skin from a suspected patient commonly shows hyperkeratosis, hyper-granulosis and acanthosis. The presence of cells in the basal and suprabasal layers of the epidermis containing variably sized vacuoles with accumulated lipids is pathognomonic for the disease.

=== Classification ===
Adult Refsum disease may be divided into the adult Refsum disease 1 and adult Refsum disease 2 subtypes. The former stems from mutations in the phytanoyl-CoA hydroxylase (PAHX aka PHYH) gene, on the PHYH locus on chromosome 10p13. It was initially believed this was the sole mutation; however 55% of cases are now attributed to mutations in other genes.

Refsum disease 2 stems from mutations in the peroxin 7 (PEX7) gene. The PEX7 gene is located in the region of chromosome 6q22-24, and mutations were found in patients presenting with accumulation of phytanic acid with no PHYH mutation.

Adult Refsum disease should not be confused with infantile Refsum disease, a peroxisome biogenesis disorder resulting from deficiencies in the catabolism of very long chain fatty acids and branched chain fatty acids (such as phytanic acid) and plasmalogen biosynthesis.

== Treatment ==
=== Diet ===
Humans do not produce phytanic acid de novo. Individuals with Refsum disease are commonly placed on a phytanic-acid–restricted diet and avoid the consumption of fats from ruminant animals and certain fish, such as tuna, cod, and haddock. The amount in fish appears largely correlated with the fat content.

==== Biological sources of phytanic acid ====
Plant materials generally do not contain phytanic acid, but they may contain free phytol which humans convert into phytanic acid. That said, the levels are much lower than in animal sources: for example, 100 grams of butter contains 176.7 mg of phytanic acid and 2.25 mg of phytol, while the highest-phytol plant-based food tested, raisins, had 3.8 mg per 100 g. Nuts may yet contain significant amounts in their skin (this study used skin-free nuts). In vitro digestion experiments using simulated digestive fluids suggests that humans can also convert phytyl fatty acid esters into phytol, though again these esters are present only in small amounts up to 5.4 mg/100 g.

In ruminant animals, the gut fermentation of consumed plant materials liberates phytol, a constituent of chlorophyll, which is then converted to phytanic acid and stored in fats. Although humans cannot derive significant amounts of phytanic acid from the consumption of chlorophyll present in plant materials, it has been proposed that the great apes (chimpanzees, gorillas and orangutans) as well as other captive non-human primates can derive significant amounts of phytanic acid from the hindgut fermentation of plant materials.

=== Other interventions ===
Plasmapheresis is another medical intervention used to treat patients. This used to be done by removing the patient's blood serum to replace it with someone else's (exchange), but a better way now involves filtering the serum to remove phytanic acid and returning it to the body. This is mainly used in serious or rapidly worsening cases.

The CYP4 isoform enzymes are known to be able to break down phytanic acid by omega oxidation in vitro. It is possible that patients can be helped by a drug that increases the level of CYP4 in the body, but not much has been published since the 2006 proposal of the idea.

== See also ==
- The Myelin Project
- List of cutaneous conditions
