= Phytanoyl-CoA =

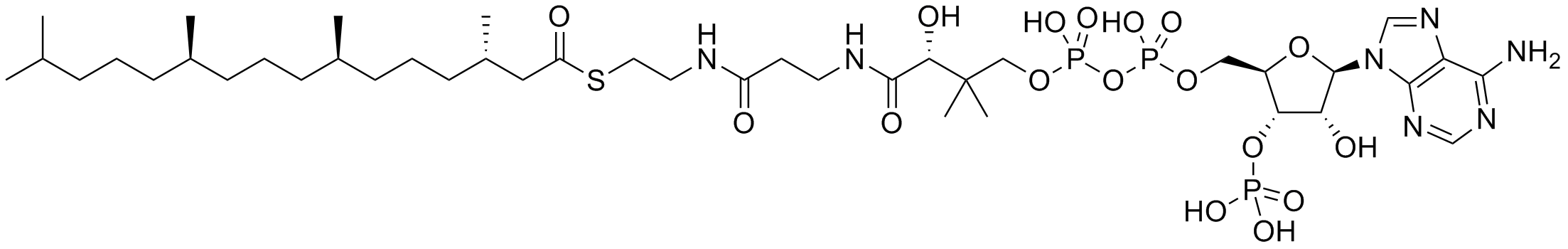

Names
- IUPAC name S-[2-[3-[[4-[[[(2R,3S,4R,5R)-5-(6-aminopurin-9-yl)-4-hydroxy-3-phosphonooxyoxolan-2-yl]methoxy-hydroxyphosphoryl]oxy-hydroxyphosphoryl]oxy-2-hydroxy-3,3-dimethylbutanoyl]amino]propanoylamino]ethyl] (3S,7R,11R)-3,7,11,15-tetramethylhexadecanethioate
- Other names Phytanoyl-coenzyme A

Identifiers
CAS Number	146622-45-9
3D model (JSmol)	Interactive image
ChemSpider	388712
PubChem CID	439640
CompTox Dashboard (EPA)	DTXSID40733885
- InChI: InChI=1S/C41H74N7O17P3S/c1-26(2)11-8-12-27(3)13-9-14-28(4)15-10-16-29(5)21-32(50)69-20-19-43-31(49)17-18-44-39(53)36(52)41(6,7)23-62-68(59,60)65-67(57,58)61-22-30-35(64-66(54,55)56)34(51)40(63-30)48-25-47-33-37(42)45-24-46-38(33)48/h24-30,34-36,40,51-52H,8-23H2,1-7H3,(H,43,49)(H,44,53)(H,57,58)(H,59,60)(H2,42,45,46)(H2,54,55,56)/t27-,28-,29+,30-,34-,35-,36?,40-/m1/s1 Key: NRJQGHHZMSOUEN-IYJVDCLDSA-N
- SMILES: O[C@@H]1[C@H](OP(O)(O)=O)[C@@H](COP(OP(OCC(C)(C)[C@@H](O)C(NCCC(NCCSC(C[C@@H](C)CCC[C@H](C)CCC[C@H](C)CCCC(C)C)=O)=O)=O)(O)=O)(O)=O)O[C@H]1N2C(N=CN=C3N)=C3N=C2

Properties
Chemical formula	C_{41}H_{74}N_{7}O_{17}P_{3}S
Molar mass	1062.06 g·mol^{−1}
- Except where otherwise noted, data are given for materials in their standard state (at 25 °C [77 °F], 100 kPa). verify (what is ?) Infobox references

Phytanoyl-CoA is a coenzyme A derivative of phytanic acid.

The enzyme phytanoyl-CoA hydroxylase catalyses hydroxylation of phytanoyl-CoA.
