= Phytosphingosine =

Names
- Preferred IUPAC name (2S,3S,4R)-2-Aminooctadecane-1,3,4-triol
- Other names: Hydroxysphinganine; D-ribo-Phytosphingosine; (4R)-Hydroxysphinganine

Identifiers
CAS Number	554-62-1
3D model (JSmol)	Interactive image
Beilstein Reference	1725301
ChEBI	CHEBI:46961
ChEMBL	ChEMBL236036
ChemSpider	108921
ECHA InfoCard	100.103.588
EC Number	439-210-6
KEGG	C12144
PubChem CID	122121
UNII	GIN46U9Q2Q
CompTox Dashboard (EPA)	DTXSID80203951
- InChI: InChI=1S/C18H39NO3/c1-2-3-4-5-6-7-8-9-10-11-12-13-14-17(21)18(22)16(19)15-20/h16-18,20-22H,2-15,19H2,1H3/t16-,17+,18-/m0/s1 Key: AERBNCYCJBRYDG-KSZLIROESA-N
- SMILES: CCCCCCCCCCCCCC[C@H]([C@H]([C@H](CO)N)O)O

Properties
Chemical formula	C_{18}H_{39}NO_{3}
Molar mass	317.514 g·mol^{−1}
Melting point	102–103 °C (216–217 °F; 375–376 K)

Hazards
- GHS labelling
Pictograms	(GHS05: Corrosive) (GHS09: Environmental hazard)
Signal word	Danger
Hazard statements	H318, H410
Precautionary statements	P273, P280, P305+P351+P338, P310, P391, P501

Related compounds
Related sphingolipids	Sulfatide; Ceramide; Sphingosine; Sphinganine; Sphingosine-1-phosphate
- Except where otherwise noted, data are given for materials in their standard state (at 25 °C [77 °F], 100 kPa). Infobox references

Phytosphingosine is a sphingoid base, a fundamental building block of more complex sphingolipids. It is abundant in plants and fungi and present in animals. Phytosphingosine has also been found to have T-cell-related anti-inflammatory properties in models of inflammatory bowel disease.
