= Phytanic acid =

20-Carbon branched fatty acid

Names
- IUPAC name (7R,11R)-3,7,11,15-Tetramethylhexadecanoic acid
- Other names phytanoic acid

Identifiers
CAS Number	14721-66-5
3D model (JSmol)	Interactive image
ChemSpider	411797
ECHA InfoCard	100.159.135
MeSH	Phytanic+acid
PubChem CID	468706
UNII	8OYE5TF5VL
CompTox Dashboard (EPA)	DTXSID80864526
- InChI: InChI=1S/C20H40O2/c1-16(2)9-6-10-17(3)11-7-12-18(4)13-8-14-19(5)15-20(21)22/h16-19H,6-15H2,1-5H3,(H,21,22)/t17-,18-,19?/m1/s1 Key: RLCKHJSFHOZMDR-PWCSWUJKSA-N
- SMILES: CC(C)CCC[C@@H](C)CCC[C@@H](C)CCCC(C)CC(=O)O

Properties
Chemical formula	C_{20}H_{40}O_{2}
Molar mass	312.538 g·mol^{−1}
- Except where otherwise noted, data are given for materials in their standard state (at 25 °C [77 °F], 100 kPa). verify (what is ?) Infobox references

Phytanic acid (or 3,7,11,15-tetramethyl hexadecanoic acid) is a branched-chain fatty acid that humans can obtain through the consumption of dairy products, ruminant animal fats, and certain fish. Western diets are estimated to provide 50–100 mg of phytanic acid per day. In a study conducted in Oxford, individuals who consumed meat had, on average, a 6.7-fold higher geometric mean plasma phytanic acid concentration than did vegans.

== In humans ==
=== Physiology ===
Unlike most fatty acids, phytanic acid cannot be metabolized by β-oxidation. Instead, it undergoes α-oxidation in the peroxisome, where it is converted into pristanic acid by the removal of one carbon. Pristanic acid can undergo several rounds of β-oxidation in the peroxisome to form medium chain fatty acids that can be converted to carbon dioxide and water in mitochondria.

=== Pathology ===
Individuals with adult Refsum disease, an autosomal recessive neurological disorder caused by mutations in the PHYH gene, have impaired α-oxidation activity and accumulate large stores of phytanic acid in their blood and tissues. This frequently leads to peripheral polyneuropathy, cerebellar ataxia, retinitis pigmentosa, anosmia, and hearing loss.

These individuals need to consume a diet low in both phytanic acid, mainly avoiding ruminant derived products. They also need to avoid free phytol, which is converted by humans into phytanic acid. A list of free phytol content in various convenience store foods is available. Humans are not able to convert significant amounts of chlorophyll into phytol, making chlorophyll not a concern.

== Presence in other organisms ==
In ruminant animals, the gut fermentation of ingested plant materials liberates phytol, a constituent of chlorophyll, which is then converted to phytanic acid and stored in fats. In contrast to observations made in humans, there is indirect evidence that diverse non-human primates, including the great apes other than humans (bonobos, chimpanzees, gorillas and orangutans), can derive significant amounts of phytanic acid from the hindgut fermentation of plant materials. They exhibit substantial phytanic acid levels in their red blood cells despite consuming a diet low in phytanic acid.

Freshwater sponges contain terpenoid acids such as 4,8,12-trimethyltridecanoic, phytanic and pristanic acids, which indicates that these acids may have chemotaxonomical significance for both marine and freshwater sponges.

Insects, such as the sumac flea beetle, are reported to use phytol and its metabolites (e.g. phytanic acid) as chemical deterrents against predation. These compounds originate from host plants.

== Modulator of transcription ==
Phytanic acid and its metabolites have been reported to bind to and/or activate the transcription factors PPAR-alpha and retinoid X receptor (RXR).
