= AADACL2 =

Protein found in humans

Identifiers
- Aliases: AADACL2, arylacetamide deacetylase like 2
- External IDs: MGI: 3646333; GeneCards: AADACL2

Gene location (Human)
Chr.	Chromosome 3 (human)
Band	3q25.1	Start	151,733,916 bp
Band	3q25.1	End	151,761,339 bp

Gene location (Mouse)
Chr.	Chromosome 3 (mouse)
Band	3|3 D	Start	59,914,164 bp
Band	3|3 D	End	59,932,841 bp
RNA expression pattern
Bgee	Human / Mouse (ortholog); Top expressed in: skin of abdomen; skin of leg; testicle; gonad; placenta; tonsil; olfactory zone of nasal mucosa; vagina; urinary bladder; transverse colon / Top expressed in: esophagus; zone of skin; lip; stomach; limb; More reference expression data
BioGPS	n/a
Gene ontology
Molecular function	carboxylic ester hydrolase activity; hydrolase activity
Cellular component	integral component of membrane; extracellular region
Biological process	metabolism; catabolic process
Sources:Amigo / QuickGO
Orthologs
Databases	NCBI: entry; OMA: entry
Species	Human	Mouse
Entrez	344752	639634
Ensembl	ENSG00000197953; ENSG00000261846	ENSMUSG00000091376
UniProt	Q6P093	B2RWD2
RefSeq (mRNA)	NM_207365	NM_001128091
RefSeq (protein)	NP_997248	NP_001121563
Location (UCSC)	Chr 3: 151.73 – 151.76 Mb	Chr 3: 59.91 – 59.93 Mb
PubMed search
- Wikidata
View/Edit Human	View/Edit Mouse

Arylacetamide deacetylase like 2 is a protein which in humans is encoded by the AADACL2 gene.

== Gene ==
The AADACL2 gene consists of 27413 nucleotides with an mRNA of approximately 5060 base pairs. There are five exons found in the AADACL2 gene. AADACL2 is found to function in catalytic activity, hydrolase activity, and found to enable carboxylic ester hydrolase activity.

== mRNA ==
The chromosomal band location of AADACL2 is 3q25.1 and is located on the plus strand of the DNA.

== Protein ==
AADACL2 in humans is 401 amino acids long. with a predicted molecular weight of 46 kDa. The isoelectric point of AADACL2 is 7.2. The AADACL2 protein contains two domains, Abhydrolase_3, that spans nearly the entire protein. Along with an intermediate domain which is Involved in the stabilization of the negatively charged intermediate by the formation of the oxyanion hole. Both of which are found to be conserved amongst orthologs.

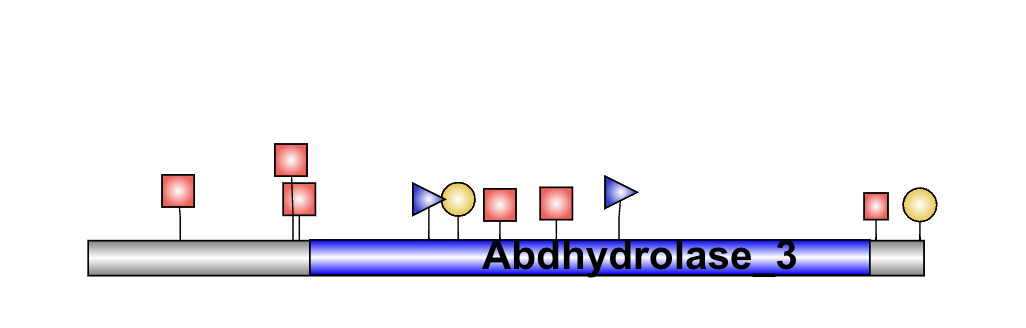
2D structure of AADACL2. Domains and post-translational modifications are labeled within each of its corresponding boundaries. Red indicates phosphorylation sites, blue indicates SUMOylation sites, and yellow indicates ubiquitination sites.

=== Localization ===
Human AADACL2 is predicted to be localized in the endoplasmic reticulum.

== Expression ==
AADACL2 is tissue specific. AADACL2 is expressed at a very high level in skin tissues. It is found to express at low levels in placenta, esophagus, small intestine and colon. It is also found in circular RNA induction during fetal development at higher levels at the intestines at 10 weeks and 20 weeks.

== Tertiary structure ==
The protein AADACL2 was found to be composed of both alpha helices along with beta barrels.

== Evolution ==
The protein encoded by AADACL2 evolves slower than the fibrinogen alpha protein but faster than the protein cytochrome c.

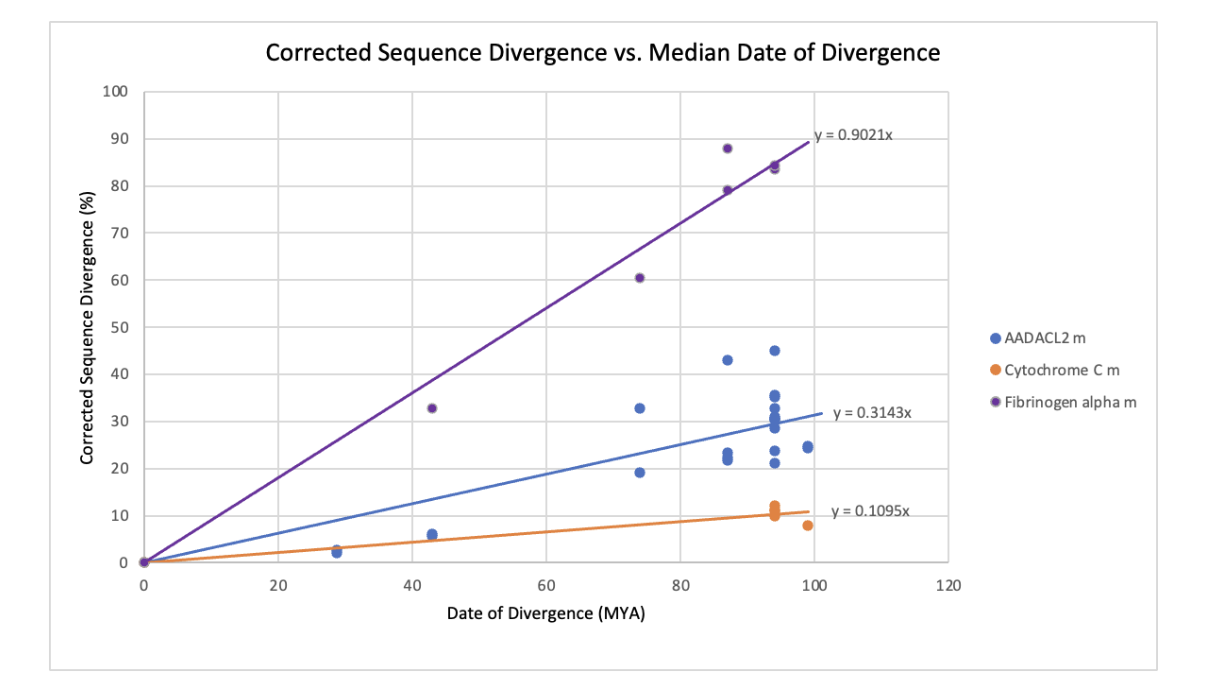
This graph depicts the corrected sequence divergence vs median date of divergence. The blue line and dots indicate AADACL2. Purple indicates the Fibrinogen alpha, and the orange indicates Cytochrome C.

=== Paralogs ===
Paralogs of AADACL2 include: AADAC (Arylacetamide Deacetylase), NCEH1 (Neutral Cholesterol Ester Hydrolase 1), AADACL3 (Arylacetamide Deacetylase Like 3), AADACL4 (Arylacetamide Deacetylase Like 4), and AFMID (Arylformamidase).

=== Orthologs ===
Arylacetamide Deacetylase like 2 is found only in mammals. AADACL2 is not found in fish, birds, reptiles, and amphibians. Arylacetamide Deacetylase like 2 is found in the following mammals: primates, flying lemurs, bats, rabbits & hares, rodents, insectivores, afrotheria, carnivores, even-toed ungulates, and odd-toed ungulates. Arylacetamide Deacetylase like 2 was approximately found to have first appeared in afrotheria 99 million years ago.

AADACL2	Genus and Species	Common Name	Taxonomic Group	Median Date of Divergence (MYA)	Protein Accession #	Protein Sequence Length (aa)	Sequence Identity to Human Protein (%)	Sequence Similarity to Human Protein (%)
Primates	Homo sapiens	Human	Primates	0	NP_997248.2	401	100.0	100.0
	Macaca mulatta	Rhesus monkey	Primates	28.8	XP_001106757.2	401	98	99.3
	Rhinopithecus roxellana	Golden snub-nosed monkey	Primates	28.8	XP_010370407.2	401	97.3	99.0
	Sapajus apella	Tufted capuchin	Primates	43	XP_032118900.1	401	94	96.3
	Aotus nancymaae	Nancy Ma's monkey	Primates	43	XP_012292432.2	401	94.5	96.5
	Microcebus murinus	Gray mouse lemur	Primates	74	XP_012646764.1	402	72.1	81.8
Flying lemurs	Cynocephalus volans	Philippine flying lemur	Dermoptera	74	XP_062934601.1	401	82.5	89.0
Bats	Rhinolophus ferrumequinum	Greater horseshoe bat	Bats	94	XP_032991506.1	401	81.0	87.8
	Pteropus alecto	Black flying fox	Chiroptera	94	XP_006926324.1	343	50.5	63.6
Rabbits & hares	Ochotona princeps	American pika	Lagomorpha	87	XP_004598151.2	401	80.5	88.3
Rodents	Octodon degus	Degu	Rodentia	87	XP_004643988.1	401	80.0	89.0
	Mus musculus	Mouse	Rodentia	87	NP_001121563	401	79.1	89.5
	Marmota monax	Woodchuck	Rodentia	87	XP_046287168.1	401	65.1	78.1
Insectivores	Condylura cristata	Star-nosed Mole	Eulipotyphla	94	XP_004682396.1	401	78.8	86.3
Afrotheria	Trichechus manatus latirostris	Florida Manatee	Sirenia	99	XP_004379276.3	402	78.4	88.1
	Elephas maximus indicus	Indian Elephant	Proboscideans	99	XP_049723395.1	402	78.1	86.8
Carnivores	Lontra canadensis	Northern American River Otter	Carnivora	94	XP_032708555.1	401	75.1	84.0
	Phoca vitulina	Harbor Seal	Carnivora	94	XP_032265082.1	400	73.8	82.0
	Ursus maritimus	Polar Bear	Carnivora	94	XP_008705296.2	401	73.6	83.3
	Mustela putorius furo	Domestic Ferret	Carnivora	94	XP_004755622.1	401	73.6	82.5
	Canis lupus dingo	Dingo	Carnivora	94	XP_025291970.3	403	73.4	81.9
	Ailuropoda melanoleuca	Giant Panda	Carnivora	94	XP_002916395.1	397	72.1	81.0
	Odobenus rosmarus divergens	Pacific Walrus	Carnivora	94	XP_004405057.1	400	70.3	80.5
Even-Toed Ungulates	Hippopotamus amphibius kiboko	Common Hippopotamus	Artiodactyls	94	XP_057593784.1	416	70.0	79.4
	Camelus dromedarius	Arabian Camel	Artiodactyls	94	XP_010985013.1	401	63.8	78.1
Odd-Toed Ungulates	Equus caballus	Horse	Perissodactyla	94	XP_014587028.1	587	49.6	56.6

== Clinical significance ==
Allergic contact dermatitis exposed to a nickel allergy, indicates that there is lower presence in the AADACL2 RNA when exposed to a nickel allergy versus the non-allergic control. Arylacetamide deacetylase-like 2 was found to be in the top fifty skin enriched genes, and was predicted to contain a signal peptide and function as a secreted protein.
