= Plasmalogen synthase =

Class of enzymes

plasmalogen synthase

Identifiers
- EC no.: 2.3.1.25
- CAS no.: 37257-10-6

Databases
- IntEnz: IntEnz view
- BRENDA: BRENDA entry
- ExPASy: NiceZyme view
- KEGG: KEGG entry
- MetaCyc: metabolic pathway
- PRIAM: profile
- PDB structures: RCSB PDB PDBe PDBsum
- Gene Ontology: AmiGO / QuickGO
Search
- PMC: articles
- PubMed: articles
- NCBI: proteins

In enzymology, a plasmalogen synthase (EC 2.3.1.25) is an enzyme that catalyzes the chemical reaction

acyl-CoA + 1-O-alk-1-enyl-glycero-3-phosphocholine $\rightleftharpoons$ CoA + plasmenylcholine

Thus, the two substrates of this enzyme are acyl-CoA and 1-O-alk-1-enyl-glycero-3-phosphocholine, whereas its two products are CoA and plasmenylcholine.

This enzyme belongs to the family of transferases, specifically those acyltransferases transferring groups other than aminoacyl groups. The systematic name of this enzyme class is acyl-CoA:1-O-alk-1-enyl-glycero-3-phosphocholine 2-O-acyltransferase. Other names in common use include lysoplasmenylcholine acyltransferase, O-1-alkenylglycero-3-phosphorylcholine acyltransferase, and 1-alkenyl-glycero-3-phosphorylcholine:acyl-CoA acyltransferase. This enzyme participates in ether lipid metabolism.

== See also ==
- 1-alkenylglycerophosphocholine O-acyltransferase
