= 1-alkenylglycerophosphoethanolamine O-acyltransferase =

Class of enzymes

Identifiers
- EC no.: 2.3.1.121
- CAS no.: 112445-17-7

Databases
- BRENDA: enzyme data
- ExPASy: NiceZyme view
- KEGG: enzyme entry
- MetaCyc: metabolic pathway
- Rhea: reactions
- PDB structures: RCSB PDB PDBe PDBsum
- Gene Ontology: AmiGO / QuickGO
Search
- PMC: articles
- PubMed: articles
- NCBI: proteins

In enzymology, a 1-alkenylglycerophosphoethanolamine O-acyltransferase (EC 2.3.1.121) is an enzyme that catalyzes the chemical reaction: acyl-CoA + 1-alkenylglycerophosphoethanolamine $\rightleftharpoons$ CoA + 1-alkenyl-2-acylglycerophosphoethanolamine

Thus, the two substrates of this enzyme are acyl-CoA and 1-alkenylglycerophosphoethanolamine, whereas its two products are CoA and 1-alkenyl-2-acylglycerophosphoethanolamine.

This enzyme belongs to the family of transferases, specifically those acyltransferases transferring groups other than aminoacyl groups. The systematic name of this enzyme class is acyl-CoA:1-alkenylglycerophosphoethanolamine O-acyltransferase. This enzyme participates in ether lipid metabolism.

== Importance ==
1-alkenylglycerophosphoethanolamine O-acyltransferase creates certain plasmalogens that carry beneficial effects, such as increasing brain health, cardiovascular function, and preventing chronic inflammation.

They also have a strong substrate preference for long-chain polyunsaturated fatty acids (PUFAs), like docosahexaenoic acid (DHA). This means that they specifically select omega-3 and omega-6 chains to complete the lipid, which directly enriches the membranes of the brain and retina, since they are essential for visual acuity and cognitive processing. When this enzyme is functioning well, it also allows cells to remove excess cholesterol, helping protect arterial walls and prevent atherosclerosis.
