= Lysolecithin acyltransferase =

Lysolecithin acyltransferase may refer to:

- 1-acylglycerophosphocholine O-acyltransferase, an enzyme
- Phosphatidylcholine—sterol O-acyltransferase, an enzyme
