= Alkylglycerophosphate 2-O-acetyltransferase =

alkylglycerophosphate 2-O-acetyltransferase

Identifiers
- EC no.: 2.3.1.105
- CAS no.: 76773-96-1

Databases
- IntEnz: IntEnz view
- BRENDA: BRENDA entry
- ExPASy: NiceZyme view
- KEGG: KEGG entry
- MetaCyc: metabolic pathway
- PRIAM: profile
- PDB structures: RCSB PDB PDBe PDBsum
- Gene Ontology: AmiGO / QuickGO
Search
- PMC: articles
- PubMed: articles
- NCBI: proteins

In enzymology, an alkylglycerophosphate 2-O-acetyltransferase (EC 2.3.1.105) is an enzyme that catalyzes the chemical reaction

acetyl-CoA + 1-alkyl-sn-glycero-3-phosphate $\rightleftharpoons$ CoA + 1-alkyl-2-acetyl-sn-glycero-3-phosphate

Thus, the two substrates of this enzyme are acetyl-CoA and 1-alkyl-sn-glycero-3-phosphate, whereas its two products are CoA and 1-alkyl-2-acetyl-sn-glycero-3-phosphate.

This enzyme belongs to the family of transferases, specifically those acyltransferases transferring groups other than aminoacyl groups. The systematic name of this enzyme class is acetyl-CoA:1-alkyl-sn-glycero-3-phosphate 2-O-acetyltransferase. This enzyme is also called alkyllyso-GP:acetyl-CoA acetyltransferase. This enzyme participates in ether lipid metabolism.
