= PAF acetyltransferase =

PAF acetyltransferase may refer to the following enzymes:

- 1-alkylglycerophosphocholine O-acetyltransferase
- Platelet-activating factor acetyltransferase
