= Glycerophospholipid arachidonoyl-transferase (CoA-independent) =

glycerophospholipid arachidonoyl-transferase (CoA-independent)

Identifiers
- EC no.: 2.3.1.147
- CAS no.: 102347-79-5

Databases
- IntEnz: IntEnz view
- BRENDA: BRENDA entry
- ExPASy: NiceZyme view
- KEGG: KEGG entry
- MetaCyc: metabolic pathway
- PRIAM: profile
- PDB structures: RCSB PDB PDBe PDBsum
- Gene Ontology: AmiGO / QuickGO
Search
- PMC: articles
- PubMed: articles
- NCBI: proteins

In the field of enzymology, a glycerophospholipid arachidonoyl-transferase (CoA-independent) (EC 2.3.1.147) is an enzyme that catalyzes the chemical reaction:

1-organyl-2-arachidonoyl-sn-glycero-3-phosphocholine + 1-organyl-2-lyso-sn-glycero-3-phosphoethanolamine $\rightleftharpoons$ 1-organyl-2-arachidonoyl-sn-glycero-3-phosphoethanolamine + 1-organyl-2-lyso-sn-glycero-3-phosphocholine

This enzyme catalyzes the transfer of arachidonic acid and other polyenoic fatty acids from intact choline or ethanolamine-containing glycerophospholipids to the sn-2 position of a lyso- glycerophospholipid. The organyl group on sn-1 of the donor or acceptor molecule can be alkyl, acyl or alk-1-enyl. This enzyme belongs to the family of transferases, specifically those acyltransferases transferring groups other than aminoacyl groups.

== Nomenclature ==
The systematic name of this enzyme class is 1-organyl-2-arachidonoyl-sn-glycero-3-phosphocholine:1-organyl-2-lys o-sn-glycero-3-phosphoethanolamine arachidonoyltransferase (CoA-independent).
