= Acylglycerone-phosphate reductase =

Class of enzymes

acylglycerone-phosphate reductase

Identifiers
- EC no.: 1.1.1.101
- CAS no.: 37250-35-4

Databases
- IntEnz: IntEnz view
- BRENDA: BRENDA entry
- ExPASy: NiceZyme view
- KEGG: KEGG entry
- MetaCyc: metabolic pathway
- PRIAM: profile
- PDB structures: RCSB PDB PDBe PDBsum
- Gene Ontology: AmiGO / QuickGO
Search
- PMC: articles
- PubMed: articles
- NCBI: proteins

In enzymology, acylglycerone-phosphate reductase (EC 1.1.1.101) is an enzyme that catalyzes the chemical reaction

1-palmitoylglycerol 3-phosphate
R=CH_{3}(CH_{2})_{14}
+ NADP^{+}
H^{+}
H^{+}
palmitoylglycerone phosphate
R=CH_{3}(CH_{2})_{14}
+ NADPH

The substrate of this enzyme is an ester of the long-chain fatty acid, CH_{3}(CH_{2})_{14}COOH (palmitic acid), which reacts with oxidised nicotinamide adenine dinucleotide phosphate (NADP^{+}). This converts the hydroxy group of the glycerol fragment to the corresponding ketone. The cofactor is converted to NADPH, and a proton is released.

This enzyme belongs to the family of oxidoreductases, specifically those acting on the CH-OH group of donor with NAD^{+} or NADP^{+} as acceptor. The systematic name of this enzyme class is 1-palmitoylglycerol-3-phosphate:NADP^{+} oxidoreductase. Other names in common use include palmitoyldihydroxyacetone-phosphate reductase, palmitoyl dihydroxyacetone phosphate reductase, palmitoyl-dihydroxyacetone-phosphate reductase, acyldihydroxyacetone phosphate reductase, and palmitoyl dihydroxyacetone phosphate reductase. This enzyme participates in glycerophospholipid and ether lipid metabolism.
