= CDP-acylglycerol O-arachidonoyltransferase =

Enzyme

Identifiers
- EC no.: 2.3.1.70
- CAS no.: 70771-22-1

Databases
- IntEnz: IntEnz view
- BRENDA: BRENDA entry
- ExPASy: NiceZyme view
- KEGG: KEGG entry
- MetaCyc: metabolic pathway
- PRIAM: profile
- PDB structures: RCSB PDB PDBe PDBsum
- Gene Ontology: AmiGO / QuickGO
Search
- PMC: articles
- PubMed: articles
- NCBI: proteins

In enzymology, a CDP-acylglycerol O-arachidonoyltransferase (EC 2.3.1.70) was an enzyme construed to catalyze the chemical reaction

arachidonoyl-CoA + CDP-acylglycerol $\rightleftharpoons$ CoA + CDP-diacylglycerol

When discovered in 1979, the two substrates of this enzyme were believed to be arachidonoyl-CoA and CDP-acylglycerol, whereas its two products were CoA and CDP-diacylglycerol.

Such enzyme were describes as transferases, specifically acyltransferases transferring groups other than aminoacyl groups. The systematic name of this enzyme class was arachidonoyl-CoA:CDP-acylglycerol O-arachidonoyltransferase. Other names also found are CDP-acylglycerol O-arachidonyltransferase, and arachidonyl-CoA:CDP-acylglycerol O-arachidonyltransferase. Such enzyme was presumably participating in glycerophospholipid metabolism.

However, no CDP-acylglycerol O-arachidonoyltransferase has been characterized, the reaction demonstrated in 1979 by Thompson and MacDonald was not reproducible. In 1983, W. Thomson retracted his discovery explaining possible contamination of their batch of liponucleotides.
