= Maltose O-acetyltransferase =

maltose O-acetyltransferase

Identifiers
- EC no.: 2.3.1.79
- CAS no.: 81295-47-8

Databases
- IntEnz: IntEnz view
- BRENDA: BRENDA entry
- ExPASy: NiceZyme view
- KEGG: KEGG entry
- MetaCyc: metabolic pathway
- PRIAM: profile
- PDB structures: RCSB PDB PDBe PDBsum
- Gene Ontology: AmiGO / QuickGO
Search
- PMC: articles
- PubMed: articles
- NCBI: proteins

In enzymology, a maltose O-acetyltransferase (EC 2.3.1.79) is an enzyme that catalyzes the chemical reaction

acetyl-CoA + maltose $\rightleftharpoons$ CoA + 6-O-acetyl-alpha-D-glucopyranosyl-(1->4)-D-glucose

Thus, the two substrates of this enzyme are acetyl-CoA and maltose, whereas its two products are CoA and [[6-O-acetyl-alpha-D-glucopyranosyl-(1->4)-D-glucose]].

This enzyme belongs to the family of transferases, specifically those acyltransferases transferring groups other than aminoacyl groups. The systematic name of this enzyme class is acetyl-CoA:maltose O-acetyltransferase. Other names in common use include maltose transacetylase, maltose O-acetyltransferase, and MAT.

== Structural studies ==
As of late 2007, 3 structures have been solved for this class of enzymes, with PDB accession codes 1OCX, 2IC7, and 2P2O.
