= AGPS =

AGPS may refer to:

- Assisted GPS
- Alkylglycerone phosphate synthase
- Australian Government Publishing Service
