= 1-acylglycerophosphocholine O-acyltransferase =

Class of enzymes

Identifiers
- EC no.: 2.3.1.23
- CAS no.: 9027-64-9

Databases
- IntEnz: IntEnz view
- BRENDA: BRENDA entry
- ExPASy: NiceZyme view
- KEGG: KEGG entry
- MetaCyc: metabolic pathway
- PRIAM: profile
- PDB structures: RCSB PDB PDBe PDBsum
- Gene Ontology: AmiGO / QuickGO
Search
- PMC: articles
- PubMed: articles
- NCBI: proteins

In enzymology, a 1-acylglycerophosphocholine O-acyltransferase (EC 2.3.1.23) is an enzyme that catalyzes the chemical reaction

acyl-CoA + 1-acyl-sn-glycero-3-phosphocholine $\rightleftharpoons$ CoA + 1,2-diacyl-sn-glycero-3-phosphocholine

Thus, the two substrates of this enzyme are acyl-CoA and 1-acyl-sn-glycero-3-phosphocholine, whereas its two products are CoA and 1,2-diacyl-sn-glycero-3-phosphocholine.

This enzyme belongs to the family of transferases, specifically those acyltransferases transferring groups other than aminoacyl groups. The systematic name of this enzyme class is acyl-CoA:1-acyl-sn-glycero-3-phosphocholine O-acyltransferase. Other names in common use include lysolecithin acyltransferase, 1-acyl-sn-glycero-3-phosphocholine acyltransferase, acyl coenzyme A-monoacylphosphatidylcholine acyltransferase, acyl-CoA:1-acyl-glycero-3-phosphocholine transacylase, lysophosphatide acyltransferase, and lysophosphatidylcholine acyltransferase. This enzyme participates in glycerophospholipid metabolism.
