= Glycerophospholipid acyltransferase (CoA-dependent) =

glycerophospholipid acyltransferase (CoA-dependent)

Identifiers
- EC no.: 2.3.1.148
- CAS no.: 9054-54-0

Databases
- IntEnz: IntEnz view
- BRENDA: BRENDA entry
- ExPASy: NiceZyme view
- KEGG: KEGG entry
- MetaCyc: metabolic pathway
- PRIAM: profile
- PDB structures: RCSB PDB PDBe PDBsum
- Gene Ontology: AmiGO / QuickGO
Search
- PMC: articles
- PubMed: articles
- NCBI: proteins

In enzymology, a glycerophospholipid acyltransferase (CoA-dependent) (EC 2.3.1.148) is an enzyme that catalyzes the chemical reaction

1-organyl-2-acyl-sn-glycero-3-phosphocholine + 1-organyl-2-lyso-sn-glycero-3-phosphoethanolamine $\rightleftharpoons$ 1-organyl-2-acyl-sn-glycero-3-phosphoethanolamine + 1-organyl-2-lyso-sn-glycero-3-phosphocholine

Thus, the two substrates of this enzyme are 1-organyl-2-acyl-sn-glycero-3-phosphocholine and 1-organyl-2-lyso-sn-glycero-3-phosphoethanolamine, whereas its two products are 1-organyl-2-acyl-sn-glycero-3-phosphoethanolamine and 1-organyl-2-lyso-sn-glycero-3-phosphocholine.

This enzyme belongs to the family of transferases, specifically those acyltransferases transferring groups other than aminoacyl groups. The systematic name of this enzyme class is 1-organyl-2-acyl-sn-glycero-3-phosphocholine:1-organyl-2-lyso-sn-gly cero-3-phosphoethanolamine acyltransferase (CoA-dependent).
