= Aminoglycoside N3'-acetyltransferase =

aminoglycoside N3'-acetyltransferase

Identifiers
- EC no.: 2.3.1.81
- CAS no.: 60120-42-5

Databases
- IntEnz: IntEnz view
- BRENDA: BRENDA entry
- ExPASy: NiceZyme view
- KEGG: KEGG entry
- MetaCyc: metabolic pathway
- PRIAM: profile
- PDB structures: RCSB PDB PDBe PDBsum
- Gene Ontology: AmiGO / QuickGO
Search
- PMC: articles
- PubMed: articles
- NCBI: proteins

In enzymology, an aminoglycoside N3'-acetyltransferase (EC 2.3.1.81) is an enzyme that catalyzes the chemical reaction

acetyl-CoA + a 2-deoxystreptamine antibiotic $\rightleftharpoons$ CoA + N_{3}'-acetyl-2-deoxystreptamine antibiotic

Thus, the two substrates of this enzyme are acetyl-CoA and 2-deoxystreptamine antibiotic, whereas its two products are CoA and N3'-acetyl-2-deoxystreptamine antibiotic.

This enzyme belongs to the family of transferases, specifically those acyltransferases transferring groups other than aminoacyl groups. The systematic name of this enzyme class is acetyl-CoA:2-deoxystreptamine-antibiotic N3'-acetyltransferase. Other names in common use include 3'-aminoglycoside acetyltransferase, and 3-N-aminoglycoside acetyltransferase.
