= Tartronate O-hydroxycinnamoyltransferase =

tartronate O-hydroxycinnamoyltransferase

Identifiers
- EC no.: 2.3.1.106
- CAS no.: 102484-57-1

Databases
- IntEnz: IntEnz view
- BRENDA: BRENDA entry
- ExPASy: NiceZyme view
- KEGG: KEGG entry
- MetaCyc: metabolic pathway
- PRIAM: profile
- PDB structures: RCSB PDB PDBe PDBsum
- Gene Ontology: AmiGO / QuickGO
Search
- PMC: articles
- PubMed: articles
- NCBI: proteins

In enzymology, a tartronate O-hydroxycinnamoyltransferase (EC 2.3.1.106) is an enzyme that catalyzes the chemical reaction

sinapoyl-CoA + 2-hydroxymalonate $\rightleftharpoons$ CoA + sinapoyltartronate

Thus, the two substrates of this enzyme are sinapoyl-CoA and 2-hydroxymalonate, whereas its two products are CoA and sinapoyltartronate.

This enzyme belongs to the family of transferases, specifically those acyltransferases transferring groups other than aminoacyl groups. The systematic name of this enzyme class is sinapoyl-CoA:2-hydroxymalonate O-(hydroxycinnamoyl)transferase. Other names in common use include tartronate sinapoyltransferase, and hydroxycinnamoyl-coenzyme-A:tartronate hydroxycinnamoyltransferase.
