= N-hydroxyarylamine O-acetyltransferase =

Identifiers
- EC no.: 2.3.1.118
- CAS no.: 100984-92-7

Databases
- IntEnz: IntEnz view
- BRENDA: BRENDA entry
- ExPASy: NiceZyme view
- KEGG: KEGG entry
- MetaCyc: metabolic pathway
- PRIAM: profile
- PDB structures: RCSB PDB PDBe PDBsum
- Gene Ontology: AmiGO / QuickGO
Search
- PMC: articles
- PubMed: articles
- NCBI: proteins

In enzymology, a N-hydroxyarylamine O-acetyltransferase (EC 2.3.1.118) is an enzyme that catalyzes the chemical reaction

acetyl-CoA + an N-hydroxyarylamine $\rightleftharpoons$ CoA + an N-acetoxyarylamine

Thus, the two substrates of this enzyme are acetyl-CoA and N-hydroxyarylamine, whereas its two products are CoA and N-acetoxyarylamine.

This enzyme belongs to the family of transferases, specifically those acyltransferases transferring groups other than aminoacyl groups. The systematic name of this enzyme class is acetyl-CoA:N-hydroxyarylamine O-acetyltransferase. Other names in common use include arylhydroxamate N,O-acetyltransferase, arylamine N-acetyltransferase, and N-hydroxy-2-aminofluorene-O-acetyltransferase.

== Structural studies ==
As of late 2007, only one structure has been solved for this class of enzymes, with the PDB accession code 1E2T.
