= Alkylglycerol kinase =

alkylglycerol kinase

Identifiers
- EC no.: 2.7.1.93
- CAS no.: 55354-37-5

Databases
- IntEnz: IntEnz view
- BRENDA: BRENDA entry
- ExPASy: NiceZyme view
- KEGG: KEGG entry
- MetaCyc: metabolic pathway
- PRIAM: profile
- PDB structures: RCSB PDB PDBe PDBsum
- Gene Ontology: AmiGO / QuickGO
Search
- PMC: articles
- PubMed: articles
- NCBI: proteins

In enzymology, an alkylglycerol kinase (EC 2.7.1.93) is an enzyme that catalyzes the chemical reaction

ATP + 1-O-alkyl-sn-glycerol $\rightleftharpoons$ ADP + 1-O-alkyl-sn-glycerol 3-phosphate

Thus, the two substrates of this enzyme are ATP and 1-O-alkyl-sn-glycerol, whereas its two products are ADP and 1-O-alkyl-sn-glycerol 3-phosphate.

This enzyme belongs to the family of transferases, specifically those transferring phosphorus-containing groups (phosphotransferases) with an alcohol group as acceptor. The systematic name of this enzyme class is ATP:1-O-alkyl-sn-glycerol 3-phosphotransferase. Other names in common use include 1-alkylglycerol kinase (phosphorylating), ATP-alkylglycerol phosphotransferase, alkylglycerol phosphotransferase, and ATP: 1-alkyl-sn-glycerol phosphotransferase. This enzyme participates in ether lipid metabolism.
