= Triacylglycerol—sterol O-acyltransferase =

Enzyme

triacylglycerol-sterol O-acyltransferase

Identifiers
- EC no.: 2.3.1.77
- CAS no.: 80487-96-3

Databases
- IntEnz: IntEnz view
- BRENDA: BRENDA entry
- ExPASy: NiceZyme view
- KEGG: KEGG entry
- MetaCyc: metabolic pathway
- PRIAM: profile
- PDB structures: RCSB PDB PDBe PDBsum
- Gene Ontology: AmiGO / QuickGO
Search
- PMC: articles
- PubMed: articles
- NCBI: proteins

In enzymology, a triacylglycerol---sterol O-acyltransferase (EC 2.3.1.77) is an enzyme that catalyzes the chemical reaction

triacylglycerol + a 3beta-hydroxysterol $\rightleftharpoons$ diacylglycerol + a 3beta-hydroxysterol ester

Thus, the two substrates of this enzyme are triacylglycerol and 3beta-hydroxysterol, whereas its two products are diacylglycerol and 3beta-hydroxysterol ester.

This enzyme belongs to the family of transferases, specifically those acyltransferases transferring groups other than aminoacyl groups. The systematic name of this enzyme class is triacylglycerol:3beta-hydroxysterol O-acyltransferase. This enzyme is also called triacylglycerol:sterol acyltransferase.
