= Decylhomocitrate synthase =

Class of enzymes

decylhomocitrate synthase

Identifiers
- EC no.: 2.3.3.4
- CAS no.: 51845-40-0

Databases
- IntEnz: IntEnz view
- BRENDA: BRENDA entry
- ExPASy: NiceZyme view
- KEGG: KEGG entry
- MetaCyc: metabolic pathway
- PRIAM: profile
- PDB structures: RCSB PDB PDBe PDBsum
- Gene Ontology: AmiGO / QuickGO
Search
- PMC: articles
- PubMed: articles
- NCBI: proteins

In enzymology, a decylhomocitrate synthase (EC 2.3.3.4) is an enzyme that catalyzes the chemical reaction

dodecanoyl-CoA + H_{2}O + 2-oxoglutarate $\rightleftharpoons$ (3S,4S)-3-hydroxytetradecane-1,3,4-tricarboxylate + CoA

The 3 substrates of this enzyme are dodecanoyl-CoA, H_{2}O, and 2-oxoglutarate, whereas its two products are (3S,4S)-3-hydroxytetradecane-1,3,4-tricarboxylate and CoA.

This enzyme belongs to the family of transferases, specifically those acyltransferases that convert acyl groups into alkyl groups on transfer. The systematic name of this enzyme class is dodecanoyl-CoA:2-oxoglutarate C-dodecanoyltransferase (thioester-hydrolysing, 1-carboxyundecyl-forming). Other names in common use include 2-decylhomocitrate synthase, 3-hydroxytetradecane-1,3,4-tricarboxylate 2-oxoglutarate-lyase, and (CoA-acylating).
