= Glucarolactone O-hydroxycinnamoyltransferase =

glucarolactone O-hydroxycinnamoyltransferase

Identifiers
- EC no.: 2.3.1.132
- CAS no.: 112956-52-2

Databases
- IntEnz: IntEnz view
- BRENDA: BRENDA entry
- ExPASy: NiceZyme view
- KEGG: KEGG entry
- MetaCyc: metabolic pathway
- PRIAM: profile
- PDB structures: RCSB PDB PDBe PDBsum
- Gene Ontology: AmiGO / QuickGO
Search
- PMC: articles
- PubMed: articles
- NCBI: proteins

In enzymology, a glucarolactone O-hydroxycinnamoyltransferase (EC 2.3.1.132) is an enzyme that catalyzes the chemical reaction

sinapoyl-CoA + glucarolactone $\rightleftharpoons$ CoA + O-sinapoylglucarolactone

Thus, the two substrates of this enzyme are sinapoyl-CoA and glucarolactone, whereas its two products are CoA and O-sinapoylglucarolactone.

This enzyme belongs to the family of transferases, specifically those acyltransferases transferring groups other than aminoacyl groups. The systematic name of this enzyme class is sinapoyl-CoA:glucarolactone O-(hydroxycinnamoyl)transferase.
