= Histidine N-acetyltransferase =

Identifiers
- EC no.: 2.3.1.33
- CAS no.: 9027-59-2

Databases
- IntEnz: IntEnz view
- BRENDA: BRENDA entry
- ExPASy: NiceZyme view
- KEGG: KEGG entry
- MetaCyc: metabolic pathway
- PRIAM: profile
- PDB structures: RCSB PDB PDBe PDBsum
- Gene Ontology: AmiGO / QuickGO
Search
- PMC: articles
- PubMed: articles
- NCBI: proteins

Histidine N-acetyltransferase (EC 2.3.1.33) is an enzyme that catalyzes the chemical reaction

histidine
+
acetyl-CoA
N-acetyl-L-histidine
+ coenzyme A

The two substrates of this enzyme characterised from killifish are histidine and acetyl-CoA. Its products are N-acetyl-histidine and coenzyme A.

This enzyme belongs to the family of transferases, specifically those acyltransferases transferring groups other than aminoacyl groups. The systematic name of this enzyme class is acetyl-CoA:L-histidine N-acetyltransferase. Other names in common use include acetylhistidine synthetase, and histidine acetyltransferase.
