= Alkylglycerophosphoethanolamine phosphodiesterase =

alkylglycerophosphoethanolamine phosphodiesterase

Identifiers
- EC no.: 3.1.4.39
- CAS no.: 62213-15-4

Databases
- IntEnz: IntEnz view
- BRENDA: BRENDA entry
- ExPASy: NiceZyme view
- KEGG: KEGG entry
- MetaCyc: metabolic pathway
- PRIAM: profile
- PDB structures: RCSB PDB PDBe PDBsum
- Gene Ontology: AmiGO / QuickGO
Search
- PMC: articles
- PubMed: articles
- NCBI: proteins

The enzyme alkylglycerophosphoethanolamine phosphodiesterase (EC 3.1.4.39) catalyzes the reaction

1-alkyl-sn-glycero-3-phosphoethanolamine + H_{2}O $\rightleftharpoons$ 1-alkyl-sn-glycerol 3-phosphate + ethanolamine

This enzyme belongs to the family of hydrolases, specifically those acting on phosphoric diester bonds. The systematic name is 1-alkyl-sn-glycero-3-phosphoethanolamine ethanolaminehydrolase. This enzyme is also called lysophospholipase D. This enzyme participates in ether lipid metabolism.

== Structural studies ==
As of late 2007, only one structure has been solved for this class of enzymes, with the PDB accession code 1FJ2.
