= 1-alkylglycerophosphocholine O-acetyltransferase =

Class of enzymes

Identifiers
- EC no.: 2.3.1.67
- CAS no.: 76773-96-1

Databases
- IntEnz: IntEnz view
- BRENDA: BRENDA entry
- ExPASy: NiceZyme view
- KEGG: KEGG entry
- MetaCyc: metabolic pathway
- PRIAM: profile
- PDB structures: RCSB PDB PDBe PDBsum
- Gene Ontology: AmiGO / QuickGO
Search
- PMC: articles
- PubMed: articles
- NCBI: proteins

In enzymology, a 1-alkylglycerophosphocholine O-acetyltransferase (EC 2.3.1.67) is an enzyme that catalyzes the chemical reaction

acetyl-CoA + 1-alkyl-sn-glycero-3-phosphocholine $\rightleftharpoons$ CoA + 2-acetyl-1-alkyl-sn-glycero-3-phosphocholine

Thus, the two substrates of this enzyme are acetyl-CoA and 1-alkyl-sn-glycero-3-phosphocholine, whereas its two products are CoA and 2-acetyl-1-alkyl-sn-glycero-3-phosphocholine.

This enzyme belongs to the family of transferases, specifically those acyltransferases transferring groups other than aminoacyl groups. The systematic name of this enzyme class is acetyl-CoA:1-alkyl-sn-glycero-3-phosphocholine 2-O-acetyltransferase. Other names in common use include acetyl-CoA:1-alkyl-2-lyso-sn-glycero-3-phosphocholine, 2-O-acetyltransferase, acetyl-CoA:lyso-PAF acetyltransferase, 1-alkyl-2-lysolecithin acetyltransferase, acyl-CoA:1-alkyl-sn-glycero-3-phosphocholine acyltransferase, blood platelet-activating factor acetyltransferase, lyso-GPC:acetyl CoA acetyltransferase, lyso-platelet activating factor:acetyl-CoA acetyltransferase, lysoPAF:acetyl CoA acetyltransferase, PAF acetyltransferase, platelet-activating factor acylhydrolase, platelet-activating factor-synthesizing enzyme, 1-alkyl-2-lyso-sn-glycero-3-phosphocholine acetyltransferase, and lyso-platelet-activating factor:acetyl-CoA acetyltransferase. This enzyme participates in ether lipid metabolism.
