= 13-hydroxylupinine O-tigloyltransferase =

Class of enzymes

Identifiers
- EC no.: 2.3.1.93
- CAS no.: 85341-00-0

Databases
- IntEnz: IntEnz view
- BRENDA: BRENDA entry
- ExPASy: NiceZyme view
- KEGG: KEGG entry
- MetaCyc: metabolic pathway
- PRIAM: profile
- PDB structures: RCSB PDB PDBe PDBsum
- Gene Ontology: AmiGO / QuickGO
Search
- PMC: articles
- PubMed: articles
- NCBI: proteins

In enzymology, a 13-hydroxylupinine O-tigloyltransferase (EC 2.3.1.93) is an enzyme that catalyzes the chemical reaction

(E)-2-methylcrotonoyl-CoA + 13-hydroxylupinine $\rightleftharpoons$ CoA + 13-(2-methylcrotonoyl)oxylupinine

Thus, the two substrates of this enzyme are (E)-2-methylcrotonoyl-CoA and 13-hydroxylupinine, whereas its two products are CoA and 13-(2-methylcrotonoyl)oxylupinine.

This enzyme belongs to the family of transferases, specifically those acyltransferases transferring groups other than aminoacyl groups. The systematic name of this enzyme class is (E)-2-methylcrotonoyl-CoA:13-hydroxylupinine O-2-methylcrotonoyltransferase. Other names in common use include tigloyl-CoA:13-hydroxylupanine O-tigloyltransferase, and 13-hydroxylupanine acyltransferase.
