= Taxadien-5alpha-ol O-acetyltransferase =

taxadien-5-alpha-ol O-acetyltransferase

Identifiers
- EC no.: 2.3.1.162
- CAS no.: 229032-29-5

Databases
- IntEnz: IntEnz view
- BRENDA: BRENDA entry
- ExPASy: NiceZyme view
- KEGG: KEGG entry
- MetaCyc: metabolic pathway
- PRIAM: profile
- PDB structures: RCSB PDB PDBe PDBsum
- Gene Ontology: AmiGO / QuickGO
Search
- PMC: articles
- PubMed: articles
- NCBI: proteins

In enzymology, a taxadien-5alpha-ol O-acetyltransferase (EC 2.3.1.162) is an enzyme that catalyzes the chemical reaction

acetyl-CoA + taxa-4(20),11-dien-5alpha-ol $\rightleftharpoons$ CoA + taxa-4(20),11-dien-5alpha-yl acetate

Thus, the two substrates of this enzyme are acetyl-CoA and taxa-4(20),11-dien-5alpha-ol, whereas its two products are CoA and taxa-4(20),11-dien-5alpha-yl acetate.

This enzyme participates in diterpenoid biosynthesis.

== Nomenclature ==
This enzyme belongs to the family of transferases, specifically those acyltransferases transferring groups other than aminoacyl groups. The systematic name of this enzyme class is acetyl-CoA:taxa-4(20),11-dien-5alpha-ol O-acetyltransferase. Other names in common use include acetyl coenzyme A:taxa-4(20),11(12)-dien-5alpha-ol O-acetyl, and transferase.
