= Phosphatidylcholine—dolichol O-acyltransferase =

phosphatidylcholine-dolichol O-acyltransferase

Identifiers
- EC no.: 2.3.1.83
- CAS no.: 9012-30-0

Databases
- IntEnz: IntEnz view
- BRENDA: BRENDA entry
- ExPASy: NiceZyme view
- KEGG: KEGG entry
- MetaCyc: metabolic pathway
- PRIAM: profile
- PDB structures: RCSB PDB PDBe PDBsum
- Gene Ontology: AmiGO / QuickGO
Search
- PMC: articles
- PubMed: articles
- NCBI: proteins

In enzymology, a phosphatidylcholine---dolichol O-acyltransferase (EC 2.3.1.83) is an enzyme that catalyzes the chemical reaction

3-sn-phosphatidylcholine + dolichol $\rightleftharpoons$ 1-acyl-sn-glycero-3-phosphocholine + acyldolichol

Thus, the two substrates of this enzyme are 3-sn-phosphatidylcholine and dolichol, whereas its two products are 1-acyl-sn-glycero-3-phosphocholine and acyldolichol.

This enzyme belongs to the family of transferases, specifically those acyltransferases transferring groups other than aminoacyl groups. The systematic name of this enzyme class is 3-sn-phosphatidylcholine:dolichol O-acyltransferase.
