= Alcohol O-cinnamoyltransferase =

Class of enzymes

alcohol O-cinnamoyltransferase

Identifiers
- EC no.: 2.3.1.152
- CAS no.: 74082-53-4

Databases
- IntEnz: IntEnz view
- BRENDA: BRENDA entry
- ExPASy: NiceZyme view
- KEGG: KEGG entry
- MetaCyc: metabolic pathway
- PRIAM: profile
- PDB structures: RCSB PDB PDBe PDBsum
- Gene Ontology: AmiGO / QuickGO
Search
- PMC: articles
- PubMed: articles
- NCBI: proteins

In enzymology, an alcohol O-cinnamoyltransferase (EC 2.3.1.152) is an enzyme that catalyzes the chemical reaction

1-O-trans-cinnamoyl-beta-D-glucopyranose + ROH $\rightleftharpoons$ alkyl cinnamate + glucose

Thus, the two substrates of this enzyme are 1-O-trans-cinnamoyl-beta-D-glucopyranose and an alkanol (ROH), whereas its two products are alkyl cinnamate and glucose.

This enzyme belongs to the family of transferases, specifically those acyltransferases transferring groups other than aminoacyl groups. The systematic name of this enzyme class is 1-O-trans-cinnamoyl-beta-D-glucopyranose:alcohol O-cinnamoyltransferase.
