= Alkylacetylglycerophosphatase =

Class of enzymes

alkylacetylglycerophosphatase

Identifiers
- EC no.: 3.1.3.59
- CAS no.: 102925-45-1

Databases
- IntEnz: IntEnz view
- BRENDA: BRENDA entry
- ExPASy: NiceZyme view
- KEGG: KEGG entry
- MetaCyc: metabolic pathway
- PRIAM: profile
- PDB structures: RCSB PDB PDBe PDBsum
- Gene Ontology: AmiGO / QuickGO
Search
- PMC: articles
- PubMed: articles
- NCBI: proteins

The enzyme alkylacetylglycerophosphatase (EC 3.1.3.59) catalyzes the reaction

1-alkyl-2-acetyl-sn-glycero-3-phosphate + H_{2}O $\rightleftharpoons$ 1-alkyl-2-acetyl-sn-glycerol + phosphate

This enzyme belongs to the family of hydrolases, specifically those acting on phosphoric monoester bonds. The systematic name is 1-alkyl-2-acetyl-sn-glycero-3-phosphate phosphohydrolase. Other names in common use include 1-alkyl-2-lyso-sn-glycero-3-P:acetyl-CoA acetyltransferase, and alkylacetylglycerophosphate phosphatase. This enzyme participates in ether lipid metabolism.
