= 8-amino-7-oxononanoate synthase =

Class of enzymes

Identifiers
- EC no.: 2.3.1.47
- CAS no.: 9075-61-0

Databases
- IntEnz: IntEnz view
- BRENDA: BRENDA entry
- ExPASy: NiceZyme view
- KEGG: KEGG entry
- MetaCyc: metabolic pathway
- PRIAM: profile
- PDB structures: RCSB PDB PDBe PDBsum
- Gene Ontology: AmiGO / QuickGO
Search
- PMC: articles
- PubMed: articles
- NCBI: proteins

In enzymology, a 8-amino-7-oxononanoate synthase (EC 2.3.1.47) is an enzyme that catalyzes the chemical reaction

6-carboxyhexanoyl-CoA + L-alanine $\rightleftharpoons$ 8-amino-7-oxononanoate + CoA + CO_{2}

Thus, the two substrates of this enzyme are 6-carboxyhexanoyl-CoA and L-alanine, whereas its 3 products are 8-amino-7-oxononanoate, CoA, and CO_{2}.

This enzyme participates in biotin metabolism. It employs one cofactor, pyridoxal phosphate.

== Nomenclature ==
This enzyme belongs to the family of transferases, specifically those acyltransferases transferring groups other than aminoacyl groups. The systematic name of this enzyme class is 6-carboxyhexanoyl-CoA:L-alanine C-carboxyhexanoyltransferase (decarboxylating). Other names in common use include 7-keto-8-aminopelargonic acid synthetase, 7-keto-8-aminopelargonic synthetase, and 8-amino-7-oxopelargonate synthase.
