= LPCAT4 =

Protein-coding gene in humans

Identifiers
- Aliases: LPCAT4, AGPAT7, AYTL3, LPAAT-eta, LPEAT2, lysophosphatidylcholine acyltransferase 4
- External IDs: OMIM: 612039; MGI: 2138993; GeneCards: LPCAT4
Enzyme activity
EC #	BRENDA	ExPASy	KEGG	MetaCyc
2.3.1.23	↗	↗	↗	↗
2.3.1.67	↗	↗	↗	↗
2.3.1.121	↗	↗	↗	↗

Gene location (Human)
Chr.	Chromosome 15 (human)
Band	15q14	Start	34,358,633 bp
Band	15q14	End	34,367,196 bp

Gene location (Mouse)
Chr.	Chromosome 2 (mouse)
Band	2|2 E3	Start	112,069,813 bp
Band	2|2 E3	End	112,077,456 bp
RNA expression pattern
Bgee	Human / Mouse (ortholog); Top expressed in: right hemisphere of cerebellum; right frontal lobe; mucosa of transverse colon; apex of heart; rectum; nucleus accumbens; Brodmann area 9; cingulate gyrus; anterior cingulate cortex; lateral nuclear group of thalamus / Top expressed in: superior frontal gyrus; primary visual cortex; zygote; granulocyte; dentate gyrus of hippocampal formation granule cell; genital tubercle; tail of embryo; esophagus; olfactory epithelium; cerebellar cortex; More reference expression data
BioGPS	n/a
Gene ontology
Molecular function	transferase activity; 1-alkenylglycerophosphoethanolamine O-acyltransferase activity; 1-alkylglycerophosphocholine O-acetyltransferase activity; 1-acylglycerophosphocholine O-acyltransferase activity; lysophospholipid acyltransferase activity; acyltransferase activity; 1-acylglycerol-3-phosphate O-acyltransferase activity; 2-acylglycerol-3-phosphate O-acyltransferase activity
Cellular component	integral component of membrane; endoplasmic reticulum membrane; membrane; endoplasmic reticulum
Biological process	phosphatidic acid biosynthetic process; phosphatidylserine acyl-chain remodeling; phosphatidylethanolamine acyl-chain remodeling; lipid metabolism; phosphatidylglycerol acyl-chain remodeling; phospholipid biosynthetic process; metabolism; phosphatidylcholine acyl-chain remodeling; phospholipid metabolic process
Sources:Amigo / QuickGO
Orthologs
Databases	NCBI: entry; OMA: entry
Species	Human	Mouse
Entrez	254531	99010
Ensembl	ENSG00000176454	ENSMUSG00000027134
UniProt	Q643R3	Q6NVG1
RefSeq (mRNA)	NM_153613	NM_207206
RefSeq (protein)	NP_705841	NP_997089
Location (UCSC)	Chr 15: 34.36 – 34.37 Mb	Chr 2: 112.07 – 112.08 Mb
PubMed search
- Wikidata
View/Edit Human	View/Edit Mouse

Lysophosphatidylcholine acyltransferase 4 is a protein that in humans is encoded by the LPCAT4 gene. LPCAT4 is a lysophospholipid acyltransferase involved in lipid metabolism. It is associated with the endoplasmic reticulum membrane.
