= Phosphatidylcholine—sterol O-acyltransferase =

phosphatidylcholine-sterol O-acyltransferase

Identifiers
- EC no.: 2.3.1.43
- CAS no.: 9031-14-5

Databases
- IntEnz: IntEnz view
- BRENDA: BRENDA entry
- ExPASy: NiceZyme view
- KEGG: KEGG entry
- MetaCyc: metabolic pathway
- PRIAM: profile
- PDB structures: RCSB PDB PDBe PDBsum
- Gene Ontology: AmiGO / QuickGO
Search
- PMC: articles
- PubMed: articles
- NCBI: proteins

In enzymology, a phosphatidylcholine---sterol O-acyltransferase (EC 2.3.1.43) is an enzyme that catalyzes the chemical reaction

phosphatidylcholine + a sterol $\rightleftharpoons$ 1-acylglycerophosphocholine + a sterol ester

Thus, the two substrates of this enzyme are phosphatidylcholine and sterol, whereas its two products are 1-acylglycerophosphocholine and sterol ester.

This enzyme belongs to the family of transferases, specifically those acyltransferases transferring groups other than aminoacyl groups. The systematic name of this enzyme class is phosphatidylcholine:sterol O-acyltransferase. Other names in common use include lecithin---cholesterol acyltransferase, phospholipid---cholesterol acyltransferase, LCAT (lecithin-cholesterol acyltransferase), lecithin:cholesterol acyltransferase, and lysolecithin acyltransferase. This enzyme participates in glycerophospholipid metabolism.
