= Polysialic-acid O-acetyltransferase =

polysialic-acid O-acetyltransferase

Identifiers
- EC no.: 2.3.1.136
- CAS no.: 116412-21-6

Databases
- IntEnz: IntEnz view
- BRENDA: BRENDA entry
- ExPASy: NiceZyme view
- KEGG: KEGG entry
- MetaCyc: metabolic pathway
- PRIAM: profile
- PDB structures: RCSB PDB PDBe PDBsum
- Gene Ontology: AmiGO / QuickGO
Search
- PMC: articles
- PubMed: articles
- NCBI: proteins

In enzymology, a polysialic-acid O-acetyltransferase (EC 2.3.1.136) is an enzyme that catalyzes the chemical reaction

acetyl-CoA + an alpha-2,8-linked polymer of sialic acid $\rightleftharpoons$ CoA + polysialic acid acetylated on O-7 or O-9

Thus, the two substrates of this enzyme are acetyl-CoA and alpha-2,8-linked polymer of sialic acid, whereas its 3 products are CoA, polysialic acid acetylated on O-7, and polysialic acid acetylated on O-9.

This enzyme belongs to the family of transferases, specifically those acyltransferases transferring groups other than aminoacyl groups. The systematic name of this enzyme class is acetyl-CoA:polysialic-acid O-acetyltransferase. Other names in common use include lecithin:retinol acyltransferase, lecithin-retinol acyltransferase, retinyl ester synthase, LRAT, and lecithin retinol acyl transferase.
