= Phenylalanine N-acetyltransferase =

Identifiers
- EC no.: 2.3.1.53
- CAS no.: 9075-16-5

Databases
- IntEnz: IntEnz view
- BRENDA: BRENDA entry
- ExPASy: NiceZyme view
- KEGG: KEGG entry
- MetaCyc: metabolic pathway
- PRIAM: profile
- PDB structures: RCSB PDB PDBe PDBsum
- Gene Ontology: AmiGO / QuickGO
Search
- PMC: articles
- PubMed: articles
- NCBI: proteins

Phenylalanine N-acetyltransferase (EC 2.3.1.53) is an enzyme that catalyzes the chemical reaction

phenylalanine
+
acetyl-CoA
N-acetyl-L-phenylalanine
+ coenzyme A

The two substrates of this enzyme characterised from Escherichia coli are phenylalanine and acetyl-CoA. Its products are N-acetyl-L-phenylalanine and coenzyme A.

This enzyme belongs to the family of transferases, specifically those acyltransferases transferring groups other than aminoacyl groups. The systematic name of this enzyme class is acetyl-CoA:L-phenylalanine N-acetyltransferase. This enzyme is also called acetyl-CoA-L-phenylalanine alpha-N-acetyltransferase. It participates in phenylalanine metabolism.
