= D-tryptophan N-acetyltransferase =

Identifiers
- EC no.: 2.3.1.34
- CAS no.: 37257-13-9

Databases
- IntEnz: IntEnz view
- BRENDA: BRENDA entry
- ExPASy: NiceZyme view
- KEGG: KEGG entry
- MetaCyc: metabolic pathway
- PRIAM: profile
- PDB structures: RCSB PDB PDBe PDBsum
- Gene Ontology: AmiGO / QuickGO
Search
- PMC: articles
- PubMed: articles
- NCBI: proteins

D-tryptophan N-acetyltransferase (EC 2.3.1.34) is an enzyme that catalyzes the chemical reaction

D-tryptophan
+
acetyl-CoA
N-acetyl-D-tryptophan
+ coenzyme A

The two substrates of this enzyme are D-tryptophan and acetyl-CoA. Its products are N-acetyl-D-tryptophan and coenzyme A.

This enzyme belongs to the family of transferases, specifically those acyltransferases transferring groups other than aminoacyl groups. The systematic name of this enzyme class is acetyl-CoA:D-tryptophan N-acetyltransferase. Other names in common use include D-tryptophan acetyltransferase, and acetyl-CoA-D-tryptophan-alpha-N-acetyltransferase.
