= Cysteine-S-conjugate N-acetyltransferase =

cysteine-S-conjugate N-acetyltransferase

Identifiers
- EC no.: 2.3.1.80
- CAS no.: 81725-80-6

Databases
- IntEnz: IntEnz view
- BRENDA: BRENDA entry
- ExPASy: NiceZyme view
- KEGG: KEGG entry
- MetaCyc: metabolic pathway
- PRIAM: profile
- PDB structures: RCSB PDB PDBe PDBsum
- Gene Ontology: AmiGO / QuickGO
Search
- PMC: articles
- PubMed: articles
- NCBI: proteins

In enzymology, a cysteine-S-conjugate N-acetyltransferase (EC 2.3.1.80) is an enzyme that catalyzes the chemical reaction

acetyl-CoA + an S-substituted L-cysteine $\rightleftharpoons$ CoA + an S-substituted N-acetyl-L-cysteine

Thus, the two substrates of this enzyme are acetyl-CoA and S-substituted L-cysteine, whereas its two products are CoA and S-substituted N-acetyl-L-cysteine.

This enzyme belongs to the family of transferases, specifically those acyltransferases transferring groups other than aminoacyl groups. The systematic name of this enzyme class is acetyl-CoA:S-substituted L-cysteine N-acetyltransferase. This enzyme participates in glutathione metabolism.
