= Trehalose O-mycolyltransferase =

trehalose O-mycolyltransferase

Identifiers
- EC no.: 2.3.1.122
- CAS no.: 111694-11-2

Databases
- IntEnz: IntEnz view
- BRENDA: BRENDA entry
- ExPASy: NiceZyme view
- KEGG: KEGG entry
- MetaCyc: metabolic pathway
- PRIAM: profile
- PDB structures: RCSB PDB PDBe PDBsum
- Gene Ontology: AmiGO / QuickGO
Search
- PMC: articles
- PubMed: articles
- NCBI: proteins

In enzymology, a trehalose O-mycolyltransferase (EC 2.3.1.122) is an enzyme that catalyzes the chemical reaction

2 alpha,alpha-trehalose 6-mycolate $\rightleftharpoons$ alpha,alpha-trehalose + alpha,alpha-trehalose 6,6'-bismycolate

Hence, this enzyme has one substrate( alpha,alpha'-trehalose 6-mycolate) and two products ( alpha,alpha-trehalose and alpha,alpha'-trehalose 6,6'-bismycolate).

This enzyme belongs to the family of transferases, specifically those acyltransferases transferring groups other than aminoacyl groups. The systematic name of this enzyme class is alpha,alpha-trehalose-6-mycolate:alpha,alpha-trehalose-6-mycolate 6'-mycolyltransferase. Other names in common use include alpha,alpha'-trehalose 6-monomycolate:alpha,alpha'-trehalose, mycolyltransferase, alpha,alpha'-trehalose-6-mycolate:alpha,alpha'-trehalose-6-mycolate, and 6'-mycolyltransferase.
