= Lipofectamine =

Transfection reagent

Lipofectamine or Lipofectamine 2000 is a common transfection reagent, produced and sold by Invitrogen, used in molecular and cellular biology. It is used to increase the transfection efficiency of RNA (including mRNA and siRNA) or plasmid DNA into in vitro cell cultures by lipofection. Lipofectamine contains lipid subunits that can form liposomes in an aqueous environment, which entrap the transfection payload, e.g. DNA plasmids.

Lipofectamine consists of a 3:1 mixture of DOSPA (2,3‐dioleoyloxy‐N‐ [2(sperminecarboxamido)ethyl]‐N,N‐dimethyl‐1‐propaniminium trifluoroacetate) and DOPE, which complexes with negatively charged nucleic acid molecules to allow them to overcome the electrostatic repulsion of the cell membrane. Lipofectamine's cationic lipid molecules are formulated with a neutral co-lipid (helper lipid). The DNA-containing liposomes (positively charged on their surface) can fuse with the negatively charged plasma membrane of living cells, due to the neutral co-lipid mediating fusion of the liposome with the cell membrane, allowing nucleic acid cargo molecules to cross into the cytoplasm for replication or expression.

In order for a cell to express a transgene, the nucleic acid must reach the nucleus of the cell to begin transcription. However, the transfected genetic material may never reach the nucleus in the first place, instead being disrupted somewhere along the delivery process. In dividing cells, the material may reach the nucleus by being trapped in the reassembling nuclear envelope following mitosis. But also in non-dividing cells, research has shown that Lipofectamine improves the efficiency of transfection, which suggests that it additionally helps the transfected genetic material penetrate the intact nuclear envelope.

This method of transfection was invented by Dr. Yongliang Chu.

== See also ==
- Lipofection
- Transfection
- Vectors in gene therapy
- Cationic liposome
