= FSAF1 =

Protein-coding gene in humans

Identifiers
- Aliases: FSAF1, chromosome 1 open reading frame 131, C1orf131, 40S Small Subunit Processome Assembly Factor 1, CPERP-A
- External IDs: MGI: 1913773; GeneCards: FSAF1

Gene location (Human)
Chr.	Chromosome 1 (human)
Band	1q42.2	Start	231,223,763 bp
Band	1q42.2	End	231,241,187 bp

Gene location (Mouse)
Chr.	Chromosome 8 (mouse)
Band	8|8 E2	Start	125,563,684 bp
Band	8|8 E2	End	125,589,859 bp
RNA expression pattern
Bgee	Human / Mouse (ortholog); Top expressed in: mucosa of ileum; secondary oocyte; tibia; duodenum; mucosa of transverse colon; pancreatic epithelial cell; jejunal mucosa; rectum; parietal pleura; endothelial cell / Top expressed in: otic vesicle; interventricular septum; otic placode; cumulus cell; primitive streak; saccule; epiblast; somite; abdominal wall; embryo; More reference expression data
BioGPS	n/a
Orthologs
Databases	NCBI: entry; OMA: entry
Species	Human	Mouse
Entrez	128061	66523
Ensembl	ENSG00000143633	ENSMUSG00000031984
UniProt	Q8NDD1	Q8CIL4
RefSeq (mRNA)	NM_152379; NM_001300830	NM_025615
RefSeq (protein)	NP_001287759; NP_689592	NP_079891
Location (UCSC)	Chr 1: 231.22 – 231.24 Mb	Chr 8: 125.56 – 125.59 Mb
PubMed search
- Wikidata
View/Edit Human	View/Edit Mouse

40S small subunit processome assembly factor 1 is a protein that in humans is encoded by the gene FSAF1. The FSAF1 protein participates in assembling ribosomes (ribosome biogenesis) in the nucleolus. In particular, it is part of the ribosome small subunit (SSU) processome, which is the earliest precursor to the SSU.

== Gene ==
In humans FSAF1 is located on the minus strand of chromosome 1 and on the cytogenetic band 1q42.2 along with 193 other genes. Notably, the gene upstream of FSAF1 is GNPAT, and the gene downstream of FSAF1 is TRIM67. When this gene is transcribed in humans, FSAF1 most often forms an mRNA of 1458 base pairs long which is composed of seven exons. There are at least nine others alternative splice forms in humans that produce proteins. They range in size from 129 base pairs (2 exons) to 1458 base pairs (7 exons).

== Protein ==
The human protein has been shown to be both phosphorylated and acetylated.
