= Plasmanylethanolamine desaturase =

Class of enzymes

plasmanylethanolamine desaturase

Identifiers
- EC no.: 1.14.19.77
- CAS no.: 39391-13-4

Databases
- BRENDA: enzyme data
- ExPASy: NiceZyme view
- KEGG: enzyme entry
- MetaCyc: metabolic pathway
- Rhea: reactions
- PDB structures: RCSB PDB PDBe PDBsum
- Gene Ontology: AmiGO / QuickGO
Search
- PMC: articles
- PubMed: articles
- NCBI: proteins

In enzymology, a plasmanylethanolamine desaturase (EC 1.14.19.77) is an enzyme that catalyzes the chemical reaction

O-1-alkyl-2-acyl-sn-glycero-3-phosphoethanolamine + AH_{2} + O_{2} $\rightleftharpoons$ O-1-alk-1-enyl-2-acyl-sn-glycero-3-phosphoethanolamine + A + 2 H_{2}O

The 3 substrates of this enzyme are O-1-alkyl-2-acyl-sn-glycero-3-phosphoethanolamine, an electron acceptor AH_{2}, and O_{2}, whereas its 3 products are O-1-alk-1-enyl-2-acyl-sn-glycero-3-phosphoethanolamine, the reduction product A, and H_{2}O.

This enzyme belongs to the family of oxidoreductases, specifically those acting on paired donors, with O2 as oxidant and incorporation or reduction of oxygen. The oxygen incorporated need not be derive from O miscellaneous. The systematic name of this enzyme class is O-1-alkyl-2-acyl-sn-glycero-3-phosphoethanolamine,hydrogen-donor:oxy gen oxidoreductase. Other names in common use include alkylacylglycerophosphoethanolamine desaturase, alkylacylglycero-phosphorylethanolamine dehydrogenase, dehydrogenase, alkyl-acylglycerophosphorylethanolamine, 1-O-alkyl-2-acyl-sn-glycero-3-phosphorylethanolamine desaturase, and 1-O-alkyl 2-acyl-sn-glycero-3-phosphorylethanolamine desaturase. This enzyme participates in ether lipid metabolism. It requires NADPH.

Plasmanylethanolamine desaturase used to be described as an orphan enzyme, that is one whose activity is known but whose identity (gene, protein sequence) is unknown. It has now been identified and corresponds to protein CarF in bacteria and TMEM189 in humans (and animals). It contains the pfam10520 lipid desaturase domain which has 8 conserved histidines and which is also found in FAD4 plant desaturases. Mice lacking plasmanylethanolamine desaturase lack plasmalogens in their tissues and have reduced body weight.
