= Platelet-activating factor acetyltransferase =

Class of enzymes

platelet-activating factor acetyltransferase

Identifiers
- EC no.: 2.3.1.149
- CAS no.: 9012-30-0

Databases
- IntEnz: IntEnz view
- BRENDA: BRENDA entry
- ExPASy: NiceZyme view
- KEGG: KEGG entry
- MetaCyc: metabolic pathway
- PRIAM: profile
- PDB structures: RCSB PDB PDBe PDBsum
- Gene Ontology: AmiGO / QuickGO
Search
- PMC: articles
- PubMed: articles
- NCBI: proteins

In enzymology, a platelet-activating factor acetyltransferase (EC 2.3.1.149) is an enzyme that catalyzes the chemical reaction

1-alkyl-2-acetyl-sn-glycero-3-phosphocholine + 1-organyl-2-lyso-sn-glycero-3-phospholipid $\rightleftharpoons$ 1-organyl-2-lyso-sn-glycero-3-phosphocholine + 1-alkyl-2-acetyl-sn-glycero-3-phospholipid

Thus, the two substrates of this enzyme are 1-alkyl-2-acetyl-sn-glycero-3-phosphocholine and 1-organyl-2-lyso-sn-glycero-3-phospholipid, whereas its two products are 1-organyl-2-lyso-sn-glycero-3-phosphocholine and 1-alkyl-2-acetyl-sn-glycero-3-phospholipid.

This enzyme belongs to the family of transferases, specifically those acyltransferases transferring groups other than aminoacyl groups. The systematic name of this enzyme class is 1-alkyl-2-acyl-sn-glycero-3-phosphocholine:1-organyl-2-lyso-sn-glyce ro-3-phospholipid acetyltransferase. This enzyme is also called PAF acetyltransferase.
