= Long-chain-alcohol O-fatty-acyltransferase =

Class of enzymes

long-chain-alcohol O-fatty-acyltransferase

Identifiers
- EC no.: 2.3.1.75
- CAS no.: 64060-40-8

Databases
- IntEnz: IntEnz view
- BRENDA: BRENDA entry
- ExPASy: NiceZyme view
- KEGG: KEGG entry
- MetaCyc: metabolic pathway
- PRIAM: profile
- PDB structures: RCSB PDB PDBe PDBsum
- Gene Ontology: AmiGO / QuickGO
Search
- PMC: articles
- PubMed: articles
- NCBI: proteins

In enzymology, a long-chain-alcohol O-fatty-acyltransferase (EC 2.3.1.75) is an enzyme that catalyzes the chemical reaction

acyl-CoA + a long-chain alcohol $\rightleftharpoons$ CoA + a long-chain ester

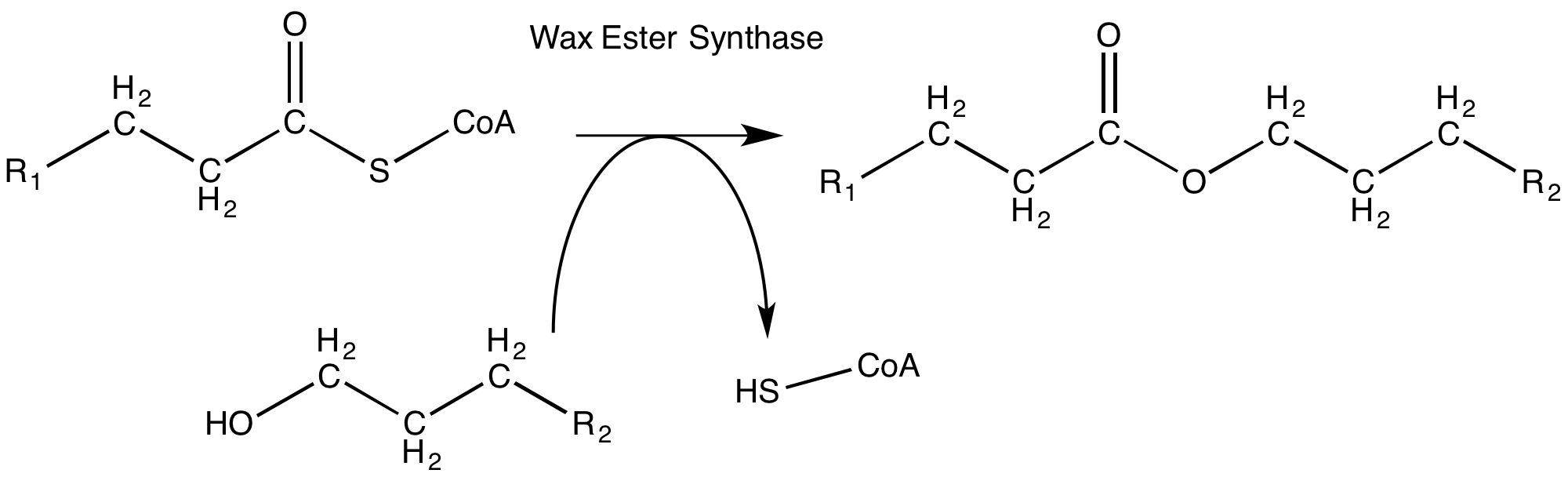
Formation of wax esters by wax synthase.

Thus, the two substrates of this enzyme are acyl-CoA and long-chain alcohol, whereas its two products are CoA and long-chain ester.

This enzyme belongs to the family of transferases, specifically those acyltransferases transferring groups other than aminoacyl groups. The systematic name of this enzyme class is acyl-CoA:long-chain-alcohol O-acyltransferase. Other names in common use include wax synthase, and wax-ester synthase. In general, wax syntheses naturally accept acyl groups with carbon chain lengths of C16 or C18 and linear alcohols with carbon chain lengths ranging from C12 to C20.

== Variation ==
There are three unrelated families of wax syntheses found in many organisms including bacteria, higher plants, and animals in two known distinct forms: either just as a wax synthase enzyme, which is found predominantly in eukaryotes, or as an enzyme with dual wax synthase and acyl CoA:diacylglycerol acyltransferase function, which is often the final enzyme in the biosynthetic pathway responsible for wax ester production from fatty alcohols and fatty acyl-CoAs and is found predominantly in prokaryotes.

=== Prokaryotic bacteria ===
==== Acinetobacter ====
There are frequent reports of wax esters biosynthesis in bacteria of the Acinetobacter genus. In particular, it has been shown that the Acinetobacter calcoaceticus ADP1 strain synthesizes wax esters through a bifunctional wax ester synthase/acyl-CoA: diacylglycerol acyltransferase (WS/DGAT) and that this complex can be functionally expressed in different bacterial hosts, suggesting the potential for potential microbial production of cheap jojoba-like wax esters. Furthermore, this was the first instance of bacterial WS/DGAT discovered. Finally, Acinetobacter has been considered as an alternative source for jojoba-like wax ester production, but is limited by the fact that its wax ester content never exceeds 14% of the cell's dry weight.

==== Rhodococcus jostii RHA1 ====
Scientists have identified at least 14 genes in the Rhodococcus jostii RHA1 genome that encode putative wax ester synthase/acyl-CoA:diacylglycerol acyltransferase enzymes (WS/DGAT) with lengths ranging from 430 to 497 amino acid residues except for atf121 product, which was composed of 301 amino acid residues.

Other bacteria that have been shown to produce wax esters through homologs for the WS/DGAT gene include Psychrobacter arcticus 273-4 and P. Cryohalolentis K5, with only one a single copy of the WS/DGAT gene, M. aquaeolei VT8, with 4 homologs for WS/DGAT and A. Baylyi, with a mixture of wax esters even though it only has one WS/DGAT coding gene. "M. tuberculosis" has also been shown to contain 15 atf genes encoding WS/DGATs. Several of these bacterial WS/DGAT enzymes have a broad substrate range despite naturally producing a small range of wax esters.

=== Plants ===
==== Arabidopsis thaliana ====
Scientists have also identified, characterized, and shown the WSD1 gene in Arabidopsis thaliana to encode a bifunctional wax ester synthase/diacylglycerol acyltransferase enzyme that is embedded in the ER membrane, in which the wax synthase portion is critical to wax ester synthesis using long-chain and very-long-chain primary alcohols with C fatty acids.

==== Jojoba ====
Although the first wax synthase in plants was identified in the jojoba plant, the jojoba wax synthase could not be functionally expressed in microorganisms like E. coli and S. cerevisiae.

=== Animals ===
==== Birds ====
The enzyme products of genes AdWS4, TaWS4, GgWS1, GgWS2, GgWS4, and GgDGAT1 sequences have been shown to catalyze wax ester syntheses in several bird species.

==== Mammals ====
Scientists have discovered cDNA encoding wax synthase in the preputial gland of mice. Furthermore, it has been shown that the wax synthase gene is located on the X chromosome, the expression of which lead to the formation of wax monoesters from straight chain, saturated, unsaturated, and polyunsaturated fatty alcohols and acids and that the formation of wax esters in mammals involves a two step biosynthetic pathway involving fatty acyl-CoA reductase and wax synthase enzymes.

==== Humans ====
The enzymes produced by X-linked genes AWAT1 and AWAT2 have been shown to esterify long chain alcohols to produce wax esters and is most predominantly expressed in skin. Both enzymes have dissimilar substrate specificities: AWAT1 prefers decyl alcohol (C10) and AWAT2 prefers C16 and C18 alcohols while using oleoyl-CoA as the acyl donor. However, when using acetyl alcohol as the acyl acceptor, AWAT1 prefers saturated acyl groups, while AWAT2 shows activity with all four acyl-CoAs and performs two times better with unsaturated acyl-CoAs than with saturated ones. Along with the murine wax ester synthase, AWAT1 and AWAT2 are likely the most significant contributors in wax ester production in mammals.

== Enzyme structure ==
While the function of the molecule has been studied, its structure has yet to be identified.

== Industrial relevance ==
There is a large demand for large-scale production of cheap jojoba-like wax esters since they have multiple commercial uses. Scientists have found a way to achieve substantial biosynthesis and accumulation of neutral lipids in "E. coli", allowing for the possibilities of economic biotechnological production of cheap jojoba oil equivalents, the use of which was previously limited by its high price resulting in its restriction to medical and cosmetic applications.

In addition, the knowledge gathered so far on the substrate specificity of different forms of wax synthase allows for scientists to explore the use of yeast cells, in particular Saccharomyces cerevisiae, in the production of biodiesel fuels. "S. Cerevisiae" is a well-documented industrial microorganism and is easy to cultivate, manipulate genetically, quick growth, and fatty acid metabolism, making it an ideal candidate for the expression of wax esters. S. Cerevisiae is further suitable as for this task as they produce the necessary reactants for wax syntheses to create wax esters. Scientists have investigated the possibility of expressing different wax synthase genes, including those of A. baylyi ADP1, M. hydrocarbonoclasticus DSM 8798, R. opacus PD630, M. musculus C57BL/6 and P. arcticus 273-4, in S. cerevisiae, and found that that of Marinobacter hydrocarbonoclasticus DSM 8798 was the most effective since it showed highest relative preference for ethanol, thus allowing for the production of biodiesel fuels, in part taking advantage of the enzyme's promiscuous nature.
