= Neutral cholesterol ester hydrolase 1 =

Protein-coding gene in the species Homo sapiens

NCEH1

Identifiers
- Aliases: NCEH1, AADACL1, NCEH, neutral cholesterol ester hydrolase 1
- External IDs: OMIM: 613234; MGI: 2443191; GeneCards: NCEH1
Enzyme activity
EC #	BRENDA	ExPASy	KEGG	MetaCyc
3.1.1.71	↗	↗	↗	↗

Gene location (Human)
Chr.	Chromosome 3 (human)
Band	3q26.31	Start	172,630,249 bp
Band	3q26.31	End	172,711,218 bp

Gene location (Mouse)
Chr.	Chromosome 3 (mouse)
Band	3|3 A3	Start	27,237,114 bp
Band	3|3 A3	End	27,338,757 bp
RNA expression pattern
Bgee	Human / Mouse (ortholog); Top expressed in: lateral nuclear group of thalamus; secondary oocyte; islet of Langerhans; prefrontal cortex; Brodmann area 9; superior frontal gyrus; right ventricle; postcentral gyrus; primary visual cortex; caudate nucleus / Top expressed in: interventricular septum; secondary oocyte; primary oocyte; otolith organ; myocardium of ventricle; utricle; epithelium of stomach; human kidney; right kidney; proximal tubule; More reference expression data
BioGPS	n/a
Gene ontology
Molecular function	carboxylic ester hydrolase activity; hydrolase activity; sterol esterase activity; serine hydrolase activity
Cellular component	integral component of membrane; endoplasmic reticulum; intracellular membrane-bounded organelle; endoplasmic reticulum membrane; membrane
Biological process	lipid catabolic process; metabolism; lipid metabolism; catabolic process; xenobiotic metabolic process; low-density lipoprotein particle clearance
Sources:Amigo / QuickGO
Orthologs
Databases	NCBI: entry; OMA: entry
Species	Human	Mouse
Entrez	57552	320024
Ensembl	ENSG00000144959	ENSMUSG00000027698
UniProt	Q6PIU2	Q8BLF1
RefSeq (mRNA)	NM_020792; NM_001146276; NM_001146277; NM_001146278	NM_178772
RefSeq (protein)	NP_001139748; NP_001139749; NP_001139750; NP_065843	NP_848887
Location (UCSC)	Chr 3: 172.63 – 172.71 Mb	Chr 3: 27.24 – 27.34 Mb
PubMed search
- Wikidata
View/Edit Human	View/Edit Mouse

Neutral cholesterol ester hydrolase 1 (NCEH) also known as arylacetamide deacetylase-like 1 (AADACL1) or KIAA1363 is an enzyme that in humans is encoded by the NCEH1 gene.

NCEH is an enzyme located in the endoplasmic reticulum. NCEH hydrolyzes 2-acetyl monoalkylglycerol ether, as part of an enzymatic pathway regulating the levels of platelet activating factor and lysophospholipids that may be involved in cancer development.

== Function ==
The enzymatic reaction catalyzed by NCEH is:

- 2-acetyl monoalkylglycerol ether → monoalkylglycerol ether

Monoalkylglycerol ethers (MAGEs) can then be converted to lysophospholipids alkyl-lysophosphatidic acid (alkyl-LPA) and alkyl-lysophosphatidylcholine (alkyl-LPC).

Controversial studies by one group also implicate the protein in the hydrolysis of cholesterol esters. However, loss of the protein in mice selectively reduces 2-acetyl monoalkylglycerol ether activity throughout the body.

== Clinical significance ==
Evidence suggests a role for NCEH in cancer. Cancer cell lines contain unusually high levels of the protein. Reduction of the amount of NCEH1 in cancer cells reduces tumor migration and growth in mice and addition of alkyl-LPA restores these processes.

NCEH can break down organophosphates like the pesticide metabolite chlorpyrifos oxon. Conversely, enzymatic activity can be inhibited by organophosphates.

== Structure ==
NCEH is a serine hydrolase that contains an N-terminal transmembrane domain, a central catalytic domain and a lipid-binding domain at its C-terminus. The protein exists in three isoforms that result from differences in mRNA splicing. Transcripts encode a protein for isoform a of 448, b of 440 and c of 275 amino acids long.

== See also ==
- Autotaxin
- phosphatidic acid
- Lysophospholipid receptor
- LPA signaling
