= AADAC =

Protein-coding gene in humans

Identifiers
- Aliases: AADAC, CES5A1, DAC, arylacetamide deacetylase
- External IDs: OMIM: 600338; MGI: 1915008; GeneCards: AADAC
Enzyme activity
EC #	BRENDA	ExPASy	KEGG	MetaCyc
3.1.1.3	↗	↗	↗	↗

Gene location (Human)
Chr.	Chromosome 3 (human)
Band	3q25.1	Start	151,814,073 bp
Band	3q25.1	End	151,828,488 bp

Gene location (Mouse)
Chr.	Chromosome 3 (mouse)
Band	3|3 D	Start	59,933,138 bp
Band	3|3 D	End	59,947,581 bp
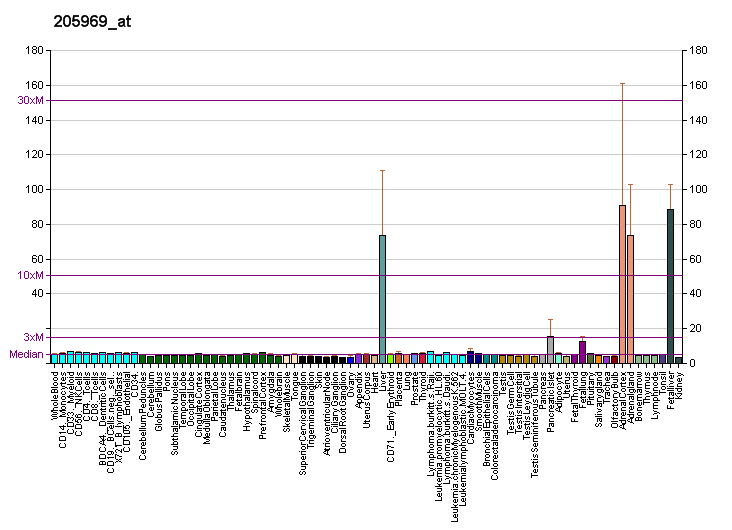
RNA expression pattern
Bgee	Human / Mouse (ortholog); Top expressed in: jejunal mucosa; right adrenal gland; right adrenal cortex; left adrenal gland; left adrenal cortex; right lobe of liver; duodenum; mucosa of ileum; body of pancreas; gallbladder / Top expressed in: left lobe of liver; right kidney; proximal tubule; duodenum; human kidney; precursor cell; migratory enteric neural crest cell; fetal liver hematopoietic progenitor cell; gallbladder; jejunum; More reference expression data
BioGPS	More reference expression data
Gene ontology
Molecular function	serine hydrolase activity; carboxylic ester hydrolase activity; catalytic activity; hydrolase activity; lipase activity; deacetylase activity; triglyceride lipase activity
Cellular component	organelle membrane; integral component of membrane; endoplasmic reticulum membrane; endoplasmic reticulum; membrane; intracellular membrane-bounded organelle
Biological process	xenobiotic metabolic process; metabolism; positive regulation of triglyceride catabolic process; catabolic process
Sources:Amigo / QuickGO
Orthologs
Databases	NCBI: entry; OMA: entry
Species	Human	Mouse
Entrez	13	67758
Ensembl	ENSG00000114771	ENSMUSG00000027761
UniProt	P22760	Q99PG0
RefSeq (mRNA)	NM_001086	NM_023383
RefSeq (protein)	NP_001077	NP_075872
Location (UCSC)	Chr 3: 151.81 – 151.83 Mb	Chr 3: 59.93 – 59.95 Mb
PubMed search
- Wikidata
View/Edit Human	View/Edit Mouse

Arylacetamide deacetylase is an enzyme that in humans is encoded by the AADAC gene.

Microsomal arylacetamide deacetylase competes against the activity of cytosolic arylamine N-acetyltransferase, which catalyzes one of the initial biotransformation pathways for arylamine and heterocyclic amine carcinogens.
