= 1,2-Dioleoyl-sn-glycerophosphoethanolamine =

Names
- IUPAC name 1,2-Di[(9Z)-octadec-9-enoyl]-sn-glycero-3-phosphoethanolamine
- Systematic IUPAC name 2-Aminoethyl (2R)-2,3-di[(9Z)-octadec-9-enoyl]propyl hydrogen phosphate
- Other names 1,2-Dioleoylphosphatidylethanolamine; DOPEA; DOPE

Identifiers
CAS Number	4004-05-1
3D model (JSmol)	Interactive image
ChEBI	CHEBI:84839
ChemSpider	7825707
PubChem CID	9546757
UNII	JNP6V6AI0U
CompTox Dashboard (EPA)	DTXSID601029609
- InChI: InChI=1S/C41H78NO8P/c1-3-5-7-9-11-13-15-17-19-21-23-25-27-29-31-33-40(43)47-37-39(38-49-51(45,46)48-36-35-42)50-41(44)34-32-30-28-26-24-22-20-18-16-14-12-10-8-6-4-2/h17-20,39H,3-16,21-38,42H2,1-2H3,(H,45,46)/b19-17-,20-18-/t39-/m1/s1 Key: MWRBNPKJOOWZPW-NYVOMTAGSA-N
- SMILES: CCCCCCCC/C=C\CCCCCCCC(=O)OC[C@H](COP(=O)(O)OCCN)OC(=O)CCCCCCC/C=C\CCCCCCCC

Properties
Chemical formula	C_{41}H_{78}NO_{8}P
Molar mass	744.048 g·mol^{−1}
- Except where otherwise noted, data are given for materials in their standard state (at 25 °C [77 °F], 100 kPa). Infobox references

1,2-Dioleoyl-sn-glycerophosphoethanolamine is a non-bilayer lipid of the phosphatidylethanolamine class, it adopts non-lamellar reverse hexagonal structures. It is a constituent of Lipofectamine, a common transfection reagent.
