= AADACL3 =

Protein-coding gene in humans

Identifiers
- Aliases: AADACL3, arylacetamide deacetylase like 3
- External IDs: MGI: 2685281; GeneCards: AADACL3

Gene location (Human)
Chr.	Chromosome 1 (human)
Band	1p36.21	Start	12,716,110 bp
Band	1p36.21	End	12,728,760 bp

Gene location (Mouse)
Chr.	Chromosome 4 (mouse)
Band	4|4 E1	Start	144,180,341 bp
Band	4|4 E1	End	144,190,326 bp
RNA expression pattern
Bgee	Human / Mouse (ortholog); Top expressed in: placenta; skin of abdomen; skin of leg; subcutaneous adipose tissue; human musculoskeletal system; skeletal muscle; muscle of leg; right lung / Top expressed in: lip; zone of skin; esophagus; stomach; More reference expression data
BioGPS	n/a
Gene ontology
Molecular function	hydrolase activity; carboxylic ester hydrolase activity
Cellular component	integral component of membrane
Biological process	metabolism; catabolic process
Sources:Amigo / QuickGO
Orthologs
Databases	NCBI: entry; OMA: entry
Species	Human	Mouse
Entrez	126767	230883
Ensembl	ENSG00000188984	ENSMUSG00000078507
UniProt	Q5VUY0	A2A7Z8
RefSeq (mRNA)	NM_001103169; NM_001103170	NM_001085503
RefSeq (protein)	NP_001096640	NP_001078972
Location (UCSC)	Chr 1: 12.72 – 12.73 Mb	Chr 4: 144.18 – 144.19 Mb
PubMed search
- Wikidata
View/Edit Human	View/Edit Mouse

Arylacetamide deacetylase-like 3 is a protein in humans that is encoded by the AADACL3 gene.
