= AADACL4 =

Protein-coding gene in humans

Identifiers
- Aliases: AADACL4, arylacetamide deacetylase like 4
- External IDs: MGI: 3650257; GeneCards: AADACL4

Gene location (Human)
Chr.	Chromosome 1 (human)
Band	1p36.21	Start	12,644,085 bp
Band	1p36.21	End	12,667,076 bp

Gene location (Mouse)
Chr.	Chromosome 4 (mouse)
Band	4|4 E1	Start	144,340,277 bp
Band	4|4 E1	End	144,349,968 bp
RNA expression pattern
Bgee	Human / Mouse (ortholog); Top expressed in: endometrium; myometrium; placenta; smooth muscle tissue; canal of the cervix; human kidney; body of uterus; lymph node; stromal cell of endometrium; left uterine tube / Top expressed in: lip; zone of skin; esophagus; stomach; More reference expression data
BioGPS	n/a
Gene ontology
Molecular function	carboxylic ester hydrolase activity; hydrolase activity
Cellular component	membrane; integral component of membrane
Biological process	metabolism; catabolic process
Sources:Amigo / QuickGO
Orthologs
Databases	NCBI: entry; OMA: entry
Species	Human	Mouse
Entrez	343066	435815
Ensembl	ENSG00000204518	ENSMUSG00000070609
UniProt	Q5VUY2	B1AVU5
RefSeq (mRNA)	NM_001013630	NM_001081248
RefSeq (protein)	NP_001013652	NP_001074717
Location (UCSC)	Chr 1: 12.64 – 12.67 Mb	Chr 4: 144.34 – 144.35 Mb
PubMed search
- Wikidata
View/Edit Human	View/Edit Mouse

Arylacetamide deacetylase-like 4 is a protein in humans that is encoded by the AADACL4 gene.
