= Glyceronephosphate O-acyltransferase =

Enzyme found in humans

GNPAT

Identifiers
- Aliases: GNPAT, Gnpat, AU019525, D1Ertd819e, DHAPAT, DAP-AT, DAPAT, RCDP2, glyceronephosphate O-acyltransferase
- External IDs: OMIM: 602744; MGI: 1343460; GeneCards: GNPAT
Enzyme activity
EC #	BRENDA	ExPASy	KEGG	MetaCyc
2.3.1.42	↗	↗	↗	↗

Gene location (Human)
Chr.	Chromosome 1 (human)
Band	1q42.2	Start	231,241,207 bp
Band	1q42.2	End	231,277,973 bp

Gene location (Mouse)
Chr.	Chromosome 8 (mouse)
Band	8 E2|8 72.81 cM	Start	125,589,772 bp
Band	8 E2|8 72.81 cM	End	125,616,796 bp
RNA expression pattern
Bgee	Human / Mouse (ortholog); Top expressed in: glutes; biceps brachii; Skeletal muscle tissue of biceps brachii; deltoid muscle; triceps brachii muscle; vastus lateralis muscle; gastrocnemius muscle; thoracic diaphragm; sperm; Skeletal muscle tissue of rectus abdominis / Top expressed in: tail of embryo; spermatid; muscle of thigh; genital tubercle; spermatocyte; neural layer of retina; seminiferous tubule; yolk sac; intercostal muscle; cardiac muscle tissue of left ventricle; More reference expression data
BioGPS	n/a
Gene ontology
Molecular function	signaling receptor binding; transferase activity; palmitoyl-CoA hydrolase activity; catalytic activity; O-acyltransferase activity; acyltransferase activity; glycerone-phosphate O-acyltransferase activity
Cellular component	mitochondrion; peroxisome; membrane; peroxisomal matrix; peroxisomal membrane; cytosol; mitochondrial membranes
Biological process	membrane organization; myelination; glycerophospholipid metabolic process; phosphatidic acid biosynthetic process; metabolism; response to starvation; response to fatty acid; synapse assembly; cerebellum morphogenesis; response to nutrient; paranodal junction assembly; ether lipid biosynthetic process; cellular lipid metabolic process; protein targeting to peroxisome; fatty acid metabolic process; phospholipid biosynthetic process
Sources:Amigo / QuickGO
Orthologs
Databases	NCBI: entry; OMA: entry
Species	Human	Mouse
Entrez	8443	14712
Ensembl	ENSG00000116906	ENSMUSG00000031985
UniProt	O15228	P98192
RefSeq (mRNA)	NM_014236; NM_001316350	NM_010322
RefSeq (protein)	NP_001303279; NP_055051	NP_034452
Location (UCSC)	Chr 1: 231.24 – 231.28 Mb	Chr 8: 125.59 – 125.62 Mb
PubMed search
- Wikidata
View/Edit Human	View/Edit Mouse

Glyceronephosphate O-acyltransferase is an enzyme associated with rhizomelic chondrodysplasia punctata type 2.

The gene encoding it, GNPAT, is located on chromosome 1 on the plus strand. The gene C1orf131 is located directly upstream of it, and the closest downstream gene is EXOC8.
