= Alkylglycerone phosphate synthase =

Class of enzymes

alkylglycerone-phosphate synthase

Identifiers
- EC no.: 2.5.1.26
- CAS no.: 64060-42-0

Databases
- BRENDA: enzyme data
- ExPASy: NiceZyme view
- KEGG: enzyme entry
- MetaCyc: metabolic pathway
- Rhea: reactions
- PDB structures: RCSB PDB PDBe PDBsum
- Gene Ontology: AmiGO / QuickGO
Search
- PMC: articles
- PubMed: articles
- NCBI: proteins

AGPS

Identifiers
- Aliases: AGPS, ADAP-S, ADAS, ADHAPS, ADPS, ALDHPSY, RCDP3, alkylglycerone phosphate synthase
- External IDs: OMIM: 603051; MGI: 2443065; GeneCards: AGPS
Enzyme activity
| EC # | BRENDA | ExPASy | KEGG | MetaCyc |
|---|---|---|---|---|
| 2.5.1.26 | ↗ | ↗ | ↗ | ↗ |

Gene location (Human)
| Chr. | Chromosome 2 (human) |
| Band | 2q31.2 | Start | 177,392,746 bp |
| Band | 2q31.2 | End | 177,567,024 bp |

Gene location (Mouse)
| Chr. | Chromosome 2 (mouse) |
| Band | 2|2 C3 | Start | 75,662,521 bp |
| Band | 2|2 C3 | End | 75,761,694 bp |
RNA expression pattern
| Bgee | Human / Mouse (ortholog); Top expressed in: sperm; Achilles tendon; rectum; tendon of biceps brachii; epithelium of colon; mucosa of sigmoid colon; bone marrow; monocyte; islet of Langerhans; bone marrow cell / Top expressed in: proximal tubule; right kidney; medullary collecting duct; zygote; human kidney; tail of embryo; secondary oocyte; granulocyte; renal corpuscle; otolith organ; More reference expression data |
| BioGPS | n/a |
Gene ontology
| Molecular function | transferase activity; oxidoreductase activity; FAD binding; protein binding; catalytic activity; alkylglycerone-phosphate synthase activity; flavin adenine dinucleotide binding; oxidoreductase activity, acting on CH-OH group of donors |
| Cellular component | peroxisomal membrane; peroxisome; peroxisomal matrix; nucleolus; membrane; mitochondrion; cytosol |
| Biological process | lipid biosynthetic process; ether lipid biosynthetic process; lipid metabolism; protein targeting to peroxisome |
Sources:Amigo / QuickGO
Orthologs
| Databases | NCBI: entry; OMA: entry |
| Species | Human | Mouse |
| Entrez | 8540 | 228061 |
| Ensembl | ENSG00000018510 | ENSMUSG00000042410 |
| UniProt | O00116 | Q8C0I1 |
| RefSeq (mRNA) | NM_003659 | NM_172666 |
| RefSeq (protein) | NP_003650 | NP_766254 |
| Location (UCSC) | Chr 2: 177.39 – 177.57 Mb | Chr 2: 75.66 – 75.76 Mb |
| PubMed search |
- Wikidata
| View/Edit Human | View/Edit Mouse |

Alkylglycerone phosphate synthase (EC 2.5.1.26) is an enzyme that in humans is encoded by the AGPS gene. It is associated with Type 3 Rhizomelic chondrodysplasia punctata. This enzyme catalyses the following chemical reaction

1-acyl-glycerone 3-phosphate + a long-chain alcohol $\rightleftharpoons$ an alkyl-glycerone 3-phosphate + a long-chain acid anion

== Alternative names ==
This enzyme has also been called: alkyldihydroxyacetonephosphate synthase, alkyldihydroxyacetone phosphate synthetase, alkyl DHAP synthetase, alkyl-DHAP, dihydroxyacetone-phosphate acyltransferase, and DHAP-AT.
