= Glycerophospholipid =

Class of lipids

Molecules in which two fatty acids and a phosphoric acid are attached to a glycerol. Glycerophospholipids are usually organized into membrane bilayers with the hydrophilic ends sticking out of the cell and the hydrophobic tails residing in the membrane.

Membrane structures. Top, an archaeal phospholipid: 1, isoprene chains; 2, ether linkages; 3, L-glycerol moiety; 4, phosphate group. Middle, a bacterial or eukaryotic phospholipid: 5, fatty acid chains; 6, ester linkages; 7, D-glycerol moiety; 8, phosphate group. Bottom: 9, lipid bilayer of bacteria and eukaryotes; 10, lipid monolayer of some archaea.

Glycerophospholipids or phosphoglycerides are glycerol-based phospholipids. They are the main component of biological membranes in eukaryotic cells. They are a type of lipid, of which its composition affects membrane structure and properties. Two major classes are known: those for bacteria and eukaryotes and a separate family for archaea.

== Structures ==
Glycerophospholipids are derived from glycerol-3-phosphate in a de novo pathway. The term glycerophospholipid signifies any derivative of glycerophosphoric acid that contains at least one O-acyl, or O-alkyl, or O-alk-1'-enyl residue attached to the glycerol moiety. The phosphate group forms an ester linkage to the glycerol. The long-chained hydrocarbons are typically attached through ester linkages in bacteria/eukaryotes and by ether linkages in archaea. In bacteria and procaryotes, the lipids consist of diesters commonly of C16 or C18 fatty acids. These acids are straight-chained and, especially for the C18 members, can be unsaturated. For archaea, the hydrocarbon chains have chain lengths of C10, C15, C20 etc. since they are derived from isoprene units. These chains are branched, with one methyl substituent per C5 subunit. These chains are linked to the glycerol phosphate by ether linkages. The two hydrocarbon chains attached to the glycerol are hydrophobic while the polar head, which mainly consists of the phosphate group attached to the third carbon of the glycerol backbone, is hydrophilic. This dual characteristic leads to the amphipathic nature of glycerophospholipids.

They are usually organized into a bilayer in membranes with the polar hydrophilic heads sticking outwards to the aqueous environment and the non-polar hydrophobic tails pointing inwards. Glycerophospholipids consist of various diverse species which usually differ slightly in structure. The most basic structure is a phosphatidate. This species is an important intermediate in the synthesis of many phosphoglycerides. The presence of an additional group attached to the phosphate allows for many different phosphoglycerides.

By convention, structures of these compounds show the 3 glycerol carbon atoms vertically with the phosphate attached to carbon atom number three (at the bottom). Plasmalogens and phosphatidates are examples.

== Nomenclature and stereochemistry ==
In general, glycerophospholipids use an "sn" notation, which stands for stereospecific numbering. When the letters "sn" appear in the nomenclature, by convention the hydroxyl group of the second carbon of glycerol (2-sn) is on the left on a Fischer projection. The numbering follows the one of Fischer's projections, being 1-sn the carbon at the top and 3-sn the one at the bottom.

The advantage of this particular notation is that the spatial configuration (D or L) of the glycero-molecule is determined intuitively by the residues on the positions sn-1 and sn-3.

For example sn-glycero-3-phosphoric acid and sn-glycero-1-phosphoric acid are enantiomers.

Most vegetable oils have unsaturated fatty acids in the sn-2 position, with saturated fatty acids in the 1-sn and/or 3-sn position. Animal fats more often have saturated fatty acids in the 2-sn, with unsaturated fatty acids in the 1-sn and/or 3-sn position.

== Examples ==
Plasmalogens

Plasmalogens are a type of phosphoglyceride. The first carbon of glycerol has a hydrocarbon chain attached via an ether, not ester, linkage. The linkages are more resistant to chemical attack than ester linkages are. The second (central) carbon atom has a fatty acid linked by an ester. The third carbon links to an ethanolamine or choline by means of a phosphate ester. These compounds are key components of the membranes of muscles and nerves.

Phosphatidates

Phosphatidates are lipids in which the first two carbon atoms of the glycerol are fatty acid esters, and the 3 is a phosphate ester. The phosphate serves as a link to another alcohol-usually ethanolamine, choline, serine, or a carbohydrate. The identity of the alcohol determines the subcategory of the phosphatidate. There is a negative charge on the phosphate and, in the case of choline or serine, a positive quaternary ammonium ion. (Serine also has a negative carboxylate group.) The presence of charges give a "head" with an overall charge. The phosphate ester portion ("head") is hydrophilic, whereas the remainder of the molecule, the fatty acid "tail", is hydrophobic. These are important components for the formation of lipid bilayers.

Phosphatidylethanolamines, phosphatidylcholines, and other phospholipids are examples of phosphatidates.

The prefix phosphatidyl-, invokes phosphatidate in the stricter sense where, like phosphatidic acid, phosphate is a simple group. Phosphatidylcholine, for example, is derived from (-yl-) the basic PA structure with the addition of choline.

Phosphatidylcholines

Phosphatidylcholines are lecithins. Choline is the alcohol, with a positively charged quaternary ammonium, bound to the phosphate, with a negative charge. Lecithins are present in all living organisms. An egg yolk has a high concentration of lecithins, which are commercially important as an emulsifying agent in products such as mayonnaise. Lecithins are also present in brain and nerve tissue.

Phosphatidylinositol

Phosphatidylinositol makes up a small component of the cytosol in eukaryotic cell membranes and gives molecules a negative charge. Its importance relies in its role in activating sensory receptors that correlate with taste functions.

Phosphatidylserine

Phosphatidylserine is important in cell signaling, specifically apoptosis. Cells will use this phosphatidylserine to enter cells via apoptotic mimicry. The structure of this lipid differs in plants and animals, regarding fatty acid composition. In addition, phosphatidylserine plays an important role in the human brain content, as it makes up 13–15% of the phospholipids in the human cerebral cortex. This lipid is found in a wide range of places. For example, in the human diet, about 130 mg are derived from phosphatidylserine. This has been said to have a positive impact on the brain, as it helps with reduced stress and improved memory.

Sphingomyelin

Sphingomyelin is a type of sphingolipid, which contains a backbone of sphingoid bases. It can be found in the myelin sheath of nerve cell axons in animal cell membranes. Sphingomyelin can be found in eggs or bovine brain. This sphingolipid is synthesized at the endoplasmic reticulum and is enriched at the plasma membrane with a larger concentration on the outside.

Other phospholipids

There are many other phospholipids, some of which are glycolipids. The glycolipids include phosphatidyl sugars where the alcohol functional group is part of a carbohydrate. Phosphatidyl sugars are present in plants and certain microorganisms. A carbohydrate is very hydrophilic due to the large number of hydroxyl groups present.

== Uses ==
=== Functions and use in membranes ===
Glycerophospholipids are the main structural component of biological membranes. Their amphipathic nature drives the formation of the lipid bilayer structure of membranes. The cell membrane seen under the electron microscope consists of two identifiable layers, or "leaflets", each of which is made up of an ordered row of glycerophospholipid molecules. The composition of each layer can vary widely depending on the type of cell.

- For example, in human erythrocytes the cytosolic side (the side facing the cytosol) of the plasma membrane consists mainly of phosphatidylethanolamine, phosphatidylserine, and phosphatidylinositol.
- By contrast, the exoplasmic side (the side on the exterior of the cell) consists mainly of phosphatidylcholine and sphingomyelin, a type of sphingolipid.

Each glycerophospholipid molecule consists of a small polar head group and two long hydrophobic chains. In the cell membrane, the two layers of phospholipids are arranged as follows:

- the hydrophobic tails point to each other and form a fatty, hydrophobic center
- the ionic head groups are placed at the inner and outer surfaces of the cell membrane

Apart from their function in cell membranes, they function in other cellular processes such as signal induction and transport. In regards to signaling, they provide the precursors for prostanglandins and other leukotrienes. It is their specific distribution and catabolism that enables them carry out the biological response processes listed above. Their roles as storage centers for secondary messengers in the membrane is also a contributing factor to their ability to act as transporters. They also influence protein function. For example, they are important constituents of lipoproteins (soluble proteins that transport fat in the blood) hence affect their metabolism and function.

=== Use in emulsification ===
Glycerophospholipids can also act as an emulsifying agent to promote dispersal of one substance into another. This is sometimes used in candy making and ice-cream making.

=== Presence in the brain ===
Neural membranes contain several classes of glycerophospholipids which turnover at different rates with respect to their structure and localization in different cells and membranes. There are three major classes namely; 1-alkyl-2-acyl glycerophospholipid, 1,2-diacyl glycerophospholipid and plasmalogen. The main function of these classes of glycerophospholipids in the neural membranes is to provide stability, permeability and fluidity through specific alterations in their compositions. The glycerophospholipid composition of neural membranes greatly alters their functional efficacy. The length of glycerophospholipid acyl chain and the degree of saturation are important determinants of many membrane characteristics including the formation of lateral domains that are rich in polyunsaturated fatty acids. Receptor-mediated degradation of glycerophospholipids by phospholipases A(l), A(2), C, and D results in generation of second messengers, such as prostaglandins, eicosanoids, platelet activating factor and diacylglycerol. Thus, neural membrane phospholipids are a reservoir for second messengers. They are also involved in apoptosis, modulation of activities of transporters, and membrane-bound enzymes. Marked alterations in neural membrane glycerophospholipid composition have been reported to occur in neurological disorders. These alterations result in changes in membrane fluidity and permeability. These processes along with the accumulation of lipid peroxides and compromised energy metabolism may be responsible for the neurodegeneration observed in neurological disorders.

=== Metabolism ===
The metabolism of glycerophospholipids is different in eukaryotes, tumor cells, and prokaryotes. Synthesis in prokaryotes involves the synthesis of glycerophospholipids phosphatidic acid and polar head groups. Phosphatidic acid synthesis in eukaryotes is different, there are two routes, one to the other toward phosphatidylcholine and phosphatidylethanolamine. Glycerophospholipids are generally metabolized in several steps with different intermediates. The very first step in this metabolism involves the addition or transfer of the fatty acid chains to the glycerol backbone to form the first intermediate, lysophosphatidic acid (LPA). LPA then becomes acylated to form the next intermediate phosphatidic acid (PA). PA can be dephosphorylated leading to the formation of diacylglycerol which is essential in the synthesis of phosphatidylcholine (PC). PC is one of the many species of glycerophospholipids. In a pathway called the Kennedy pathway, the polar heads are added to complete the formation of the entire structure consisting of the polar head regions, the two fatty acid chains and the phosphate group attached to the glycerol backbone. In this Kennedy pathway, Choline is converted to CDP-Choline which drives the transfer of the polar head groups to complete the formation of PC. PC can then be further converted to other species of glycerophospholipids such as phosphatidylserine (PS) and phosphatidylethanolamine (PE).

== See also ==
- Biological membrane
- Phospholipid
- Glycerolipid
- 1,2-Dioleoyl-sn-glycerophosphoethanolamine
