= Ether lipid =

Class of chemical compounds

Structure of an ether phospholipid. Note ether at first and second positions.

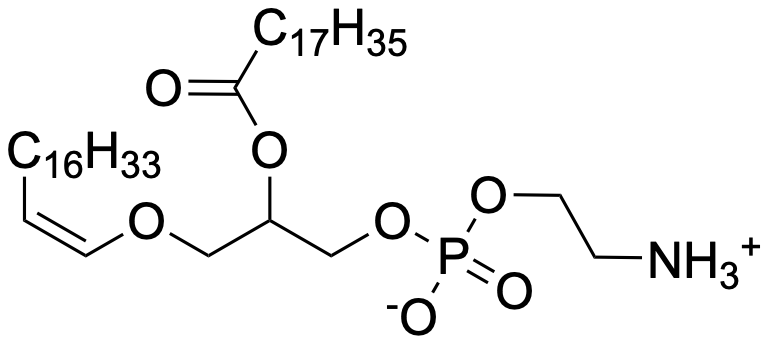
Plasmalogen. Note ether at first position, and ester at second position.

Platelet-activating factor. Note ether at first position, and acyl group at second position.

In biochemistry, an ether lipid refers to any lipid in which the lipid "tail" group is attached to the glycerol backbone via an ether bond at any position. In contrast, conventional glycerophospholipids and triglycerides are triesters. Structural types include:

- Ether phospholipids: phospholipids are known to have ether-linked "tails" instead of the usual ester linkage.
  - Ether on sn-1, ester on sn-2: "ether lipids" in the context of bacteria and eukaryotes refer to this class of lipids. Compared to the usual 1,2-diacyl-sn-glycerol (DAG), the sn-1 linkage is replaced with an ester bond.

Based on whether the sn-1 lipid is unsaturated next to the ether linkage, they can be further divided into alkenyl-acylphospholipids ("plasmenylphospholipid", 1-0-alk-1’-enyl-2-acyl-sn-glycerol) and alkyl-acylphospholipids ("plasmanylphospholipid"). This class of lipids have important roles in human cell signaling and structure.

  - Ether on sn-2 and sn-3: this class with flipped chirality on the phosphate connection is called an "archaeal ether lipid". With few (if any) exceptions, it is only found among archaea. The part excluding the phosphate group is known as archaeol.
- Ether analogues of triglycerides: 1-alkyldiacyl-sn-glycerols (alkyldiacylglycerols) are found in significant proportions in marine animals.
- Other ether lipids: a number of other lipids not belonging to any of the classes above contain the ether linkage. For example, seminolipid, a vital part of the testes and sperm cells, has an ether linkage.

The term "plasmalogen" can refer to any ether lipid with a vinyl ether linkage, i.e. ones with a carbon-carbon double bond next to the ether linkage. Without specification it generally refers to alkenyl-acylphospholipids, but "neutral plasmalogens" (alkenyldiacylglycerols) and "diplasmalogens" (dialkenylphospholipids) also exist.

== In eukaryotes ==
=== Biosynthesis ===
The formation of the ether bond in mammals requires two enzymes, dihydroxyacetonephosphate acyltransferase (DHAPAT) and alkyldihydroxyacetonephosphate synthase (ADAPS), that reside in the peroxisome. Accordingly, peroxisomal defects often lead to impairment of ether-lipid production.

The conversion of an ordinary saturated ether lipid into a plaminogen is achieved by plasmanylethanolamine desaturase (PEDS1), which catalyzes an aerobic oxidation in the endoplamic reticulum.

Monoalkylglycerol ethers (MAGEs) are also generated from 2-acetyl MAGEs (precursors of platelet-activating factor) by KIAA1363.

=== Functions ===
==== Structural ====
Plasmalogens as well as some 1-O-alkyl lipids are ubiquitous and sometimes major parts of the cell membranes in mammals. The glycosylphosphatidylinositol anchor of mammalian proteins generally consist of an 1-O-alkyl lipid.

1-alkyldiacyl-sn-glycerols, i.e. the ether analog of triglycerides, also occur in animals. They are present in very small amounts in mammals. They are found in very high amounts in the livers of marine animals, both vertebrates like sharks (especially spiny dogfish and ratfish) and invertebrates like squids. They are also found in all corals.

==== Second messenger ====
Differences between the catabolism of ether glycerophospholipids by specific phospholipases enzymes might be involved in the generation of lipid second messenger systems such as prostaglandins and arachidonic acid that are important in signal transduction. Ether lipids can also act directly in cell signaling, as the platelet-activating factor is an ether lipid signaling molecule that is involved in leukocyte function in the mammalian immune system.

==== Antioxidant ====
Another possible function of the plasmalogen ether lipids is as antioxidants, as protective effects against oxidative stress have been demonstrated in cell culture and these lipids might therefore play a role in serum lipoprotein metabolism. This antioxidant activity comes from the enol ether double bond being targeted by a variety of reactive oxygen species.

=== Synthetic ether lipid analogs ===
Synthetic ether lipid analogs have cytostatic and cytotoxic properties, probably by disrupting membrane structure and acting as inhibitors of enzymes within signal transmission pathways, such as protein kinase C and phospholipase C.

A toxic ether lipid analogue miltefosine has recently been introduced as an oral treatment for the tropical disease leishmaniasis, which is caused by leishmania, a protozoal parasite with a particularly high ether lipid content in its membranes.

== In archaea ==
The cell membrane of archaea consist mostly of ether phospholipids. These lipids have a flipped chirality compared to bacterial and eukaryotic membranes, a conundrum known as the "lipid divide". The "tail" groups are also not simply n-alkyl groups, but highly methylated chains made up of saturated isoprenoid units (e.g. phytanyl).

Among different groups of archaea, diverse modifications on the basic archaeol backbone have emerged.

- The two (usually C_{20}) tails can be linked together, forming a macrocyclic lipid.
- Bipolar macrocyclic tetraether lipids (caldarchaeol), with two glycerol units connected by two C_{40} "tail" chains, form covalently linked 'bilayers'.
  - Some such covalent bilayers feature crosslinks between the two chains, giving an H-shaped molecule.
  - Crenarchaeol is a tetraether backbone with cyclopentane and cyclohexane rings on the cross-linked "tail"s. See also glycerol dialkyl glycerol tetraether for more of this class
- Some lipids replace the glycerol backbone with four-carbon polyols (tetrols). An example is a tetriol-diphytanyl diether.

== In bacteria ==
Ether phospholipids are major parts of the cell membrane in anaerobic bacteria. These lipids can be variously 1-O-alkyl, 2-O-alkyl, or 1,2-O-dialkyl. Plasminogens also exist, but they are made by anaerobic reduction from an ester as opposed to the aerobic eukaryotic process.

Some groups of bacteria have, like archaea, evolved tetraether lipids (so-called brGDGT). These differ from archaeal ones by their chirality and the non-isoprenoid structure.

== See also ==
- Membrane lipid
- Glycerol dialkyl glycerol tetraether
