= Acyltransferase =

Class of enzymes

Acyl

Acyltransferase is a type of transferase enzyme that acts upon acyl groups.

Examples include:

- Glycerol-3-phosphate acyltransferases
- Glyceronephosphate O-acyltransferase
- Lecithin-cholesterol acyltransferase
- Long-chain-alcohol O-fatty-acyltransferase

== See also ==
- Acetyltransferase
