= Osteogenesis imperfecta =

Group of genetic disorders resulting in fragile bones

Osteogenesis imperfecta (OI)
- Other names: Brittle bone disease, Lobstein syndrome, fragilitas ossium, Vrolik disease, osteopsathyrosis idiopathica
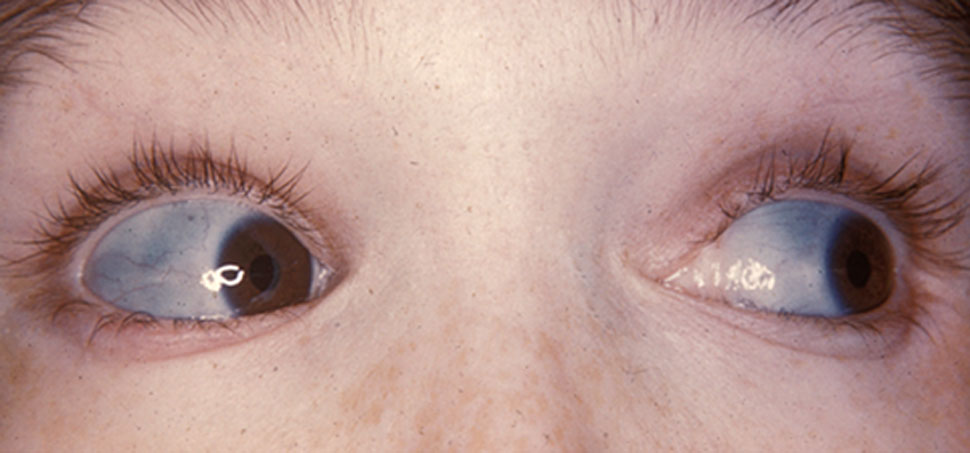
- Blue sclerae are a classic non-pathognomonic sign of osteogenesis imperfecta.
- Pronunciation: /ˌɒstioʊˈdʒɛnəsɪs ˌɪmpɜːrˈfɛktə/ OSS-tee-oh-JEN-ə-siss IM-pur-FEK-tə
- Specialty: Pediatrics, medical genetics, orthopedics
- Symptoms: Bones that break easily, blue tinge to the sclera (whites of the eye), short height, joint hypermobility, hearing loss
- Onset: Birth
- Duration: Long term
- Causes: Genetic (autosomal dominant or de novo mutation)
- Diagnostic method: Based on symptoms, DNA testing
- Prevention: Pre-implantation genetic diagnosis
- Management: Healthy lifestyle (exercise, no smoking), metal rods through the long bones
- Medication: Bisphosphonates
- Prognosis: Depends on the type
- Frequency: 1 in 15,000–20,000 people

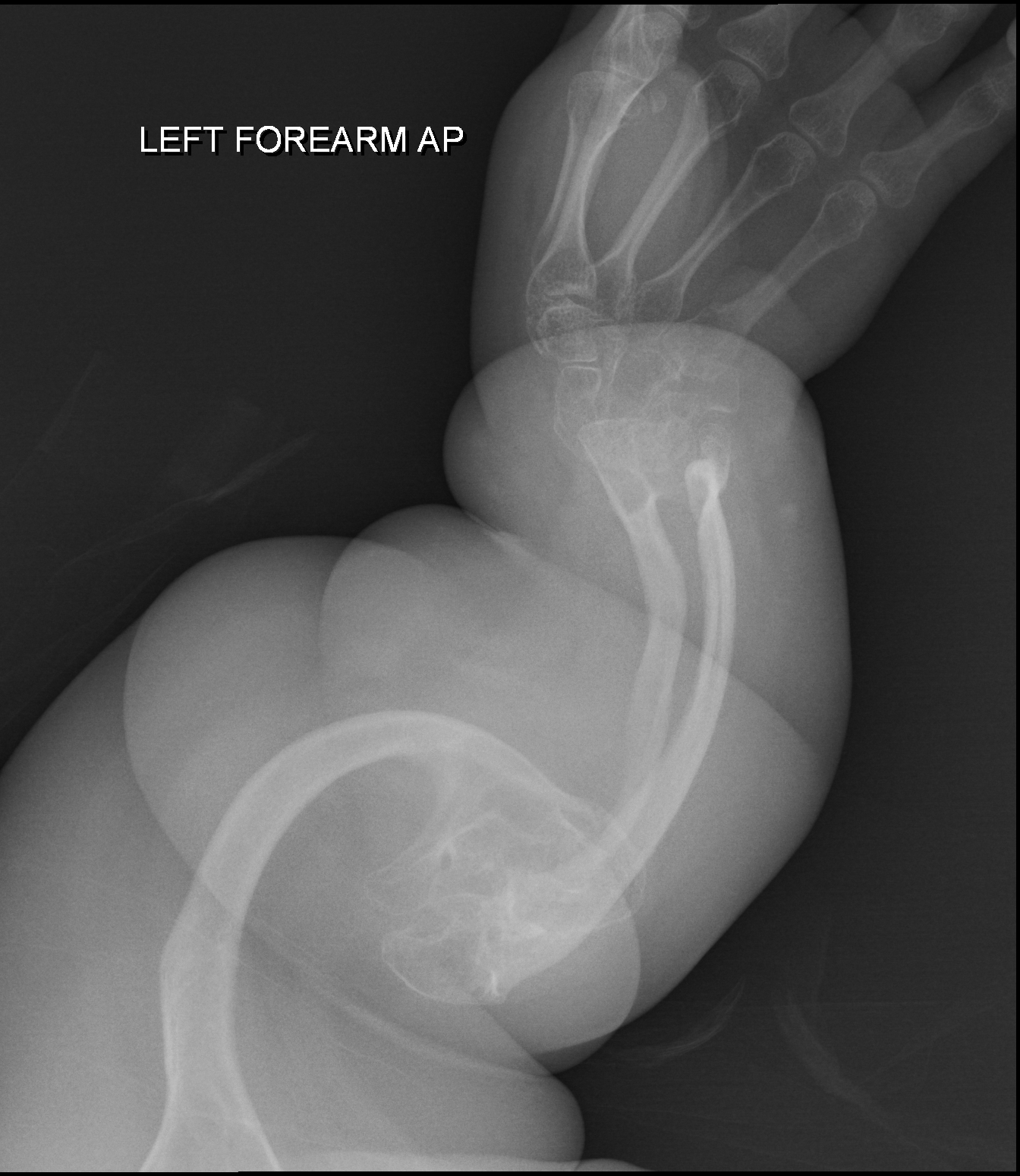
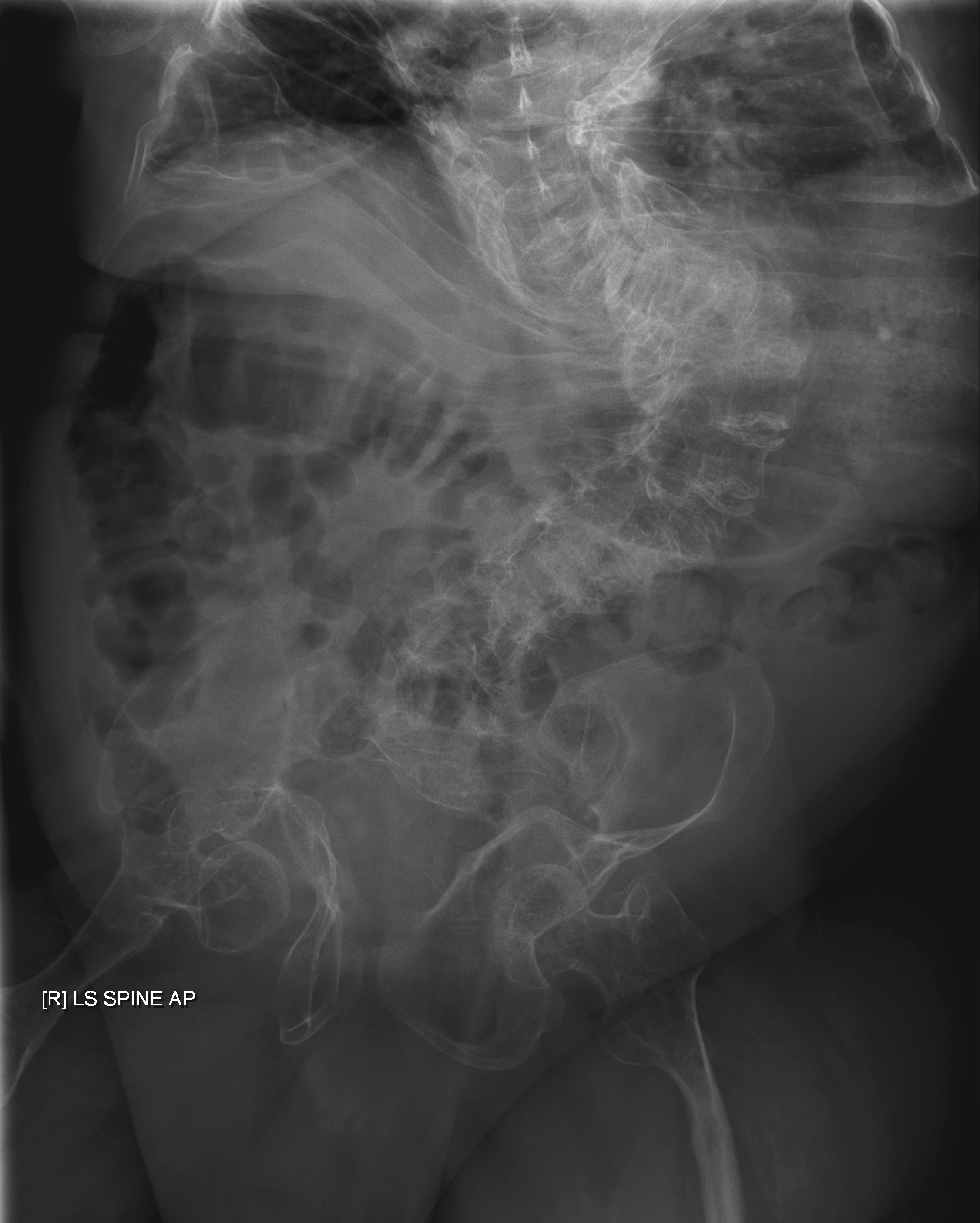
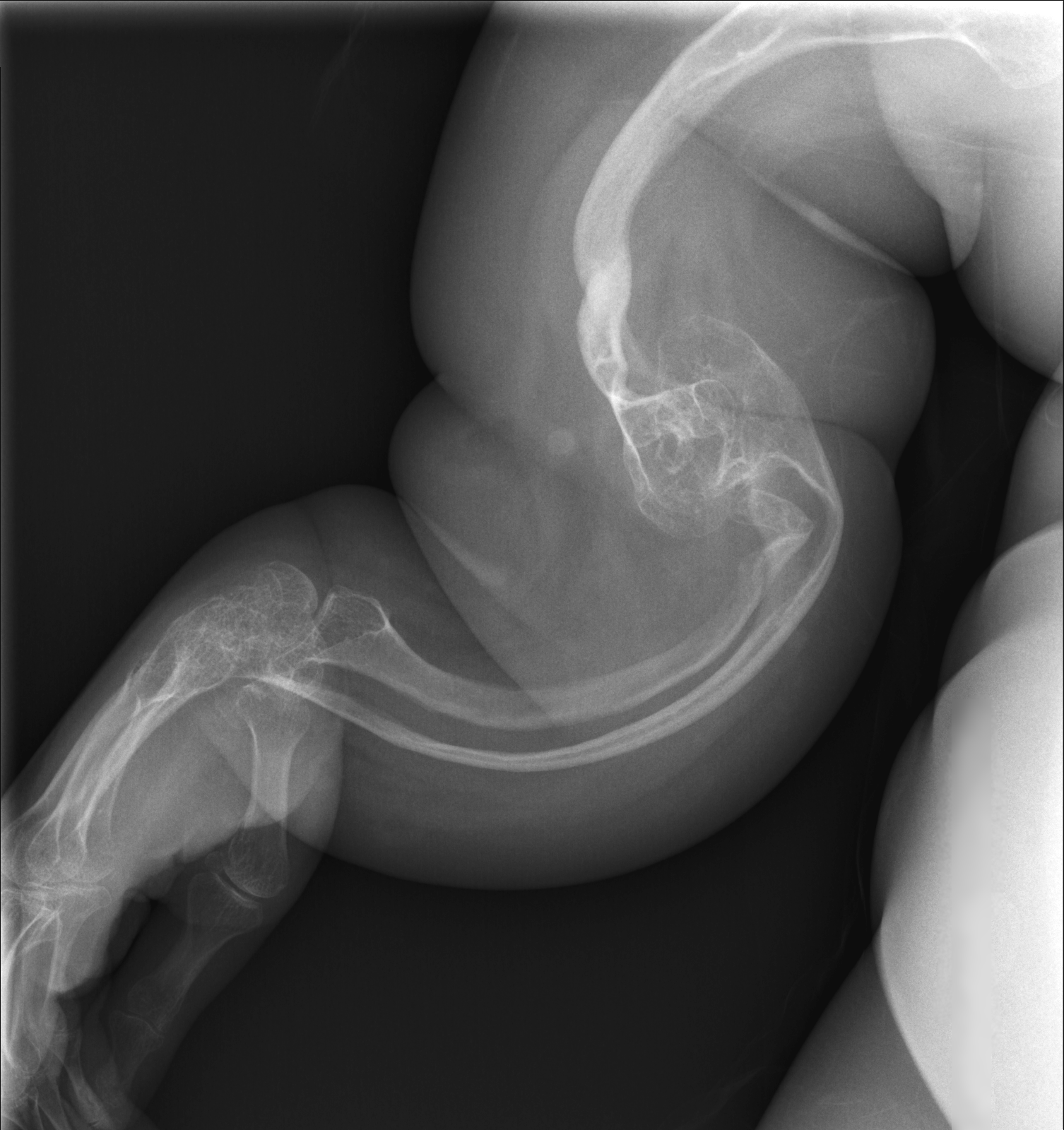
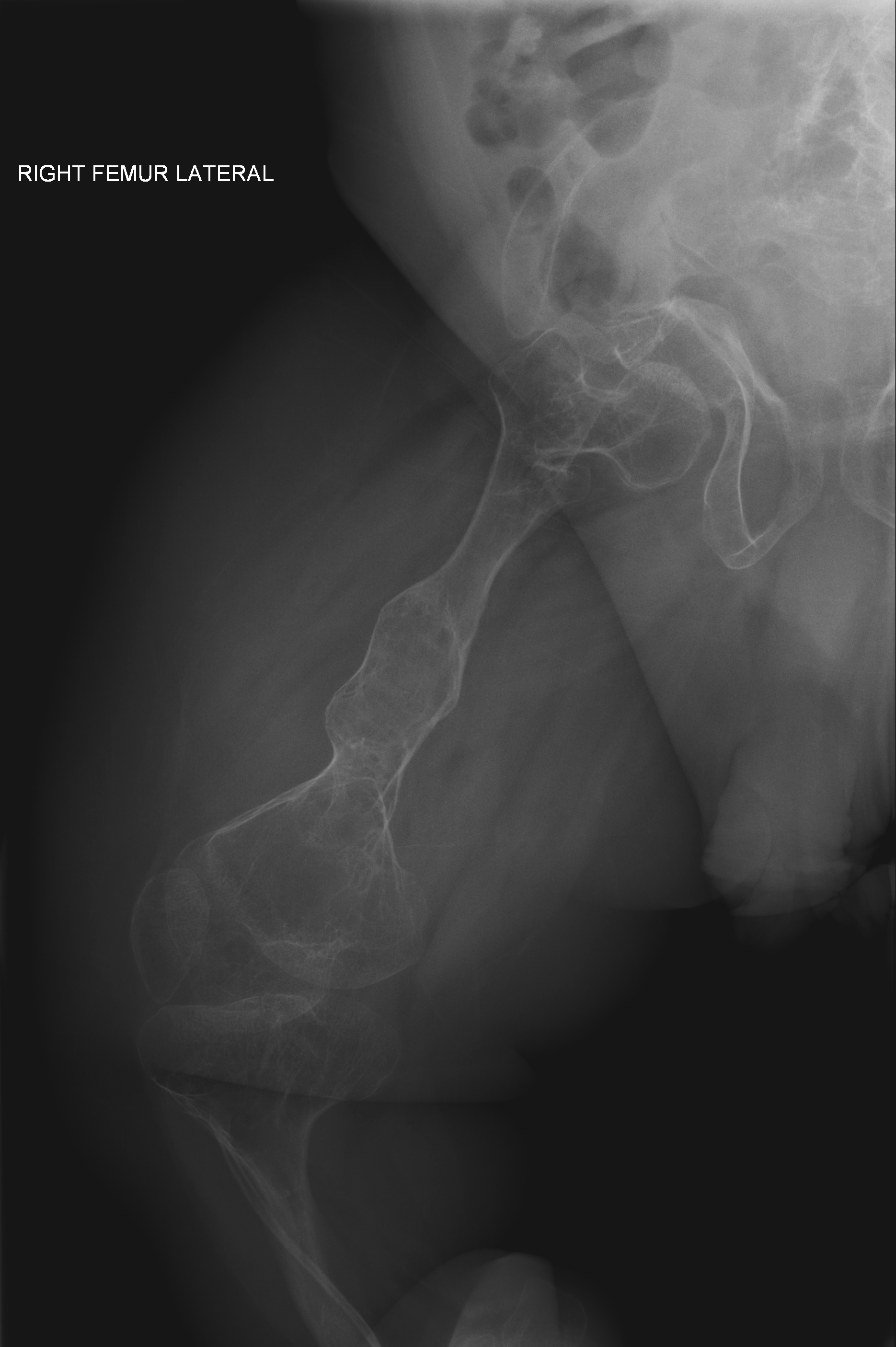
Four X-rays of Fredrick Brennan, who had had more than one hundred bone fractures in his lifetime, and received a childhood clinical diagnosis of type IV–B OI. Genetic diagnosis in 2018 identified a previously uncatalogued pathogenic variant in the gene which encodes proα2(I) chains of type I procollagen, COL1A2, at exon 19, substitution c.974G>A. Due to childhood neglect and poverty, subject never received surgery to implant intramedullary rods. Malunions are evident as the humerus and femur were broken in adolescence but orthopedic care did not follow. Severe scoliosis, as well as kyphosis, are also evident. The unavoidably low contrast in the film is due to a combination of subject's obesity and low bone mineral density (BMD). Subject's BMD Z-score was -4.1 according to results of a dual-energy X-ray absorptiometry (DXA) scan also done in 2018.

Osteogenesis imperfecta (IPA: /ˌɒstioʊˈdʒɛnəsɪs ˌɪmpɜːrˈfɛktə/; OI), colloquially known as brittle bone disease, is a group of genetic disorders that all result in bones that break easily. The range of symptoms—on the skeleton as well as on the body's other organs—may be mild to severe. Symptoms found in various types of OI include whites of the eye (sclerae) that are blue instead, short stature, loose joints, hearing loss, breathing problems and problems with the teeth (dentinogenesis imperfecta). Potentially life-threatening complications, all of which become more common in more severe OI, include: tearing (dissection) of the major arteries, such as the aorta; pulmonary valve insufficiency secondary to distortion of the ribcage; and basilar invagination.

The underlying mechanism is usually a problem with connective tissue due to a lack of, or poorly formed, type I collagen. In more than 90% of cases, OI occurs due to mutations in the COL1A1 or COL1A2 genes. These mutations may be hereditary in an autosomal dominant manner but may also occur spontaneously (de novo). There are four clinically defined types: type I, the least severe; type IV, moderately severe; type III, severe and progressively deforming; and type II, perinatally lethal. As of September 2021, 19 different genes are known to cause the 21 documented genetically defined types of OI, many of which are extremely rare and have only been documented in a few individuals. Diagnosis is often based on symptoms and may be confirmed by collagen biopsy or DNA sequencing.

Although there is no cure, most cases of OI do not have a major effect on life expectancy, death during childhood from it is rare, and many adults with OI can achieve a significant degree of autonomy despite disability. Maintaining a healthy lifestyle by exercising, eating a balanced diet sufficient in vitamin D and calcium, and avoiding smoking can help prevent fractures. Genetic counseling may be sought by those with OI to prevent their children from inheriting the disorder from them. Treatment may include acute care of broken bones, pain medication, physical therapy, mobility aids such as leg braces and wheelchairs, vitamin D supplementation, and, especially in childhood, rodding surgery. Rodding is an implantation of metal intramedullary rods along the long bones (such as the femur) in an attempt to strengthen them. Medical research also supports the use of medications of the bisphosphonate class, such as pamidronate, to increase bone density. Bisphosphonates are especially effective at increasing bone density in children; however, it is unclear if they either increase quality of life or decrease the rate of fracture incidence.

OI affects only about one in 15,000 to 20,000 people, making it a rare genetic disease. Outcomes depend on the genetic cause of the disorder (its type). Type I (the least severe) is the most common, with other types comprising a minority of cases. Moderate-to-severe OI primarily affects mobility; if rodding surgery is performed during childhood, some of those with more severe types of OI may gain the ability to walk. The condition has been described since ancient history. The Latinate term osteogenesis imperfecta was coined by Dutch anatomist Willem Vrolik in 1849; translated literally, it means "imperfect bone formation".

== Signs and symptoms ==
=== Orthopedic ===
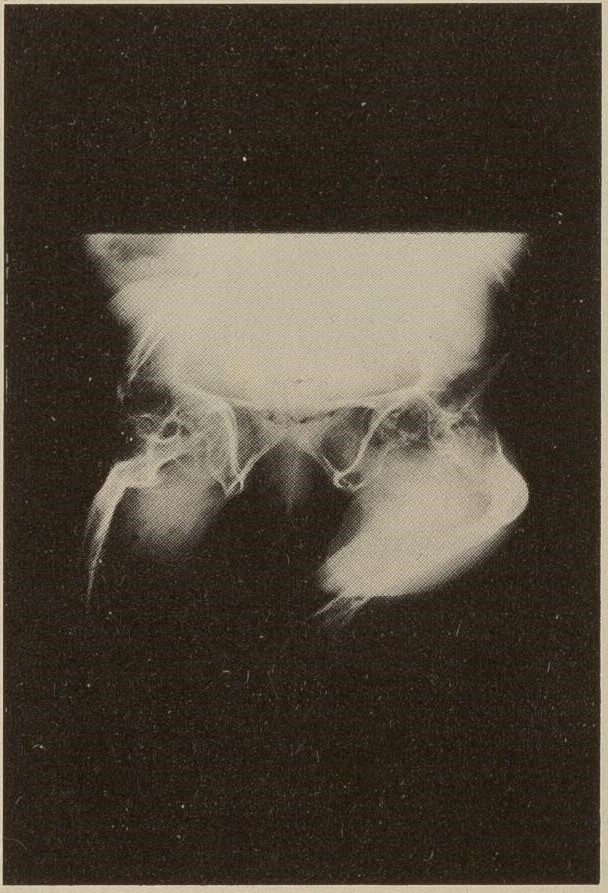
X-ray of the pelvis in osteogenesis imperfecta, showing low bone density

The main symptom of osteogenesis imperfecta is fragile, low mineral density bones; all types of OI have some bone involvement. In moderate and especially severe OI, the long bones may be bowed, sometimes extremely so. The weakness of the bones causes them to fracture easily—a study at the Endocrine Unit at the National Institute of Child Health in Karachi, Pakistan found an average of 5.8 fractures per year in untreated children. Fractures typically occur much less after puberty, but begin to increase again in women after menopause and in men between the ages of 60 and 80.

Joint hypermobility is also a common sign of OI, thought to be because the affected genes are the same as those that cause some types of Ehlers–Danlos syndrome. (Note: One OI mutation also causes combined Ehler–Danlos syndrome: "OIEDS1". (Cabral, et al. 2005, Rasmussen 2020))

=== Otologic ===
By the age of 50, about 50% of adults with OI experience significant hearing loss, much earlier as compared to the general population. Hearing loss in OI may or may not be associated with visible deformities of the ossicles and inner ear. Hearing loss frequently begins during the second, third, and fourth decades of life, and may be conductive, sensorineural, or a combination of both ("mixed"). If hearing loss does not occur by age 50, it is significantly less likely to occur in the years afterwards. Mixed hearing loss is most common among those with OI of all age groups, while conductive hearing loss is most likely to affect older people, with sensorineural hearing loss most likely to affect children.

Although relatively rare, OI-related hearing loss can also begin in childhood; in a study of forty-five children aged four to sixteen, two were found to be affected, aged 11 and 15. In a different 2008 study, the hearing of 41 people with OI was checked. The results showed that 88% of those over 20 years of age had some form of hearing loss, while only 38% of those under 20 did.

Hearing loss is most common in type I OI; it is less common in types III and IV. Other parts of the inner ear may also be affected by OI. causing balance issues; however, only small studies have found links between vertigo and OI. OI may worsen the outcome of medical treatments which correct hearing loss.

Besides OI's association with sensorineural hearing loss, OI is associated with several neurological abnormalities, usually involving the central nervous system, due to deformities in the skeletal structures surrounding it. Neurological complications, especially basilar invagination, may adversely affect life expectancy. In OI, this is most often due to upwards migration of the dens, a feature of the C2 vertebra. Neurosurgery may be needed to correct severe abnormalities when they risk the patient's life or cause either great suffering or intolerable neurological deficits.

=== Systemic ===
As its biological causes have been more precisely determined, it has become more widely recognized that while the primary disease process of OI happens in the bones, the most common types of OI—those caused by type I collagen gene mutations—affect virtually all of the human body's organs in some way.

Type I collagen is present throughout the circulatory and respiratory systems: from the ventricles of the heart itself, to the heart valves, to the vasculature, it is an integral part of the connective tissue of the lungs. As such, cardiovascular complications, among them aortic insufficiency, aortic aneurysm, and arterial dissections, are sometimes comorbid with OI, but not as frequently as they are comorbid with Marfan syndrome.

Respiratory illnesses are a major cause of death in OI. The most obvious source of respiratory problems in OI is pulmonary insufficiency caused by problems in the architecture of the thoracic wall. However, respiratory tract infections, such as pneumonia, are also more fatal among those with OI than the general population. Those with more severe ribcage deformities were found to have worse lung restriction in a small-scale 2012 study involving 22 Italian patients with OI types III and IV, plus 26 non-affected controls.

OI—especially its severe form, type III—also has effects on the gastrointestinal system. It was found to be associated with recurrent abdominal pain and chronic constipation in two studies on patients affected by OI. Chronic constipation is especially common, and is thought to be aggravated by an asymmetric pelvis (acetabular protrusion). Especially in childhood, OI-associated constipation may cause a feeling of fullness and associated food refusal, leading to malnutrition.

== Classification ==
There are two typing systems for OI in modern use. The first, created by David Sillence in 1979, classifies patients into four types, or syndromes, according to their clinical presentation, without taking into account the genetic cause of their disease. The second system expands on the Sillence model, but assigns new numbered types genetically as they are found. Therefore, people with OI can be described as having both a clinical type and a genetic type, which may or may not be equivalent.

Type I is the most common, and 90% of cases result from mutations to either COL1A1 or COL1A2. Symptoms vary widely between types, as well as vary from person to person, even in the same family.

As of 2021, 21 types of OI have been defined:

Sillence's four types
Type	Description	Gene	OMIM	Mode of inheritance	Incidence	Defined (Note: When year is uncited, OMIM is the source.)
I	mild	Null COL1A1 allele	166200	autosomal dominant, 34% de novo	1 in 30,000	1979
II	lethal in the perinatal period	COL1A1, COL1A2	166210	autosomal dominant, ≈100% de novo	1 in 40,000 to 1 in 100,000	1979
III	severe, progressive and deforming	COL1A1, COL1A2	259420	autosomal dominant, 85% de novo	1 in 60,000	1979
IV	variable and deforming, but usually with normal sclerae	COL1A1, COL1A2	166220	autosomal dominant, 50% de novo	1 in 30,000	1979
Genetically defined types
Type	Gene		OMIM	Mode of inheritance (Note: For references for genes for OI types VII+, see the types entry in § Genetically defined types.)		Defined
V	IFITM5		610967	autosomal dominant		2000 (Note: Genetic cause not determined until 2012. (Cho, et al. 2012))
VI	SERPINF1		613982	autosomal recessive		2002
VII	CRTAP		610682	autosomal recessive		2006
VIII	LEPRE1		610915	autosomal recessive		2007
IX	PPIB		259440	autosomal recessive		2009
X	SERPINH1		613848	autosomal recessive		2010
XI	FKBP10		610968	autosomal recessive		2010
XII	SP7		613849	autosomal recessive		2010
XIII	BMP1		614856	autosomal recessive		2012
XIV	TMEM38B		615066	autosomal recessive		2012
XV	WNT1		615220	autosomal recessive		2013
XVI	CREB3L1		616229	autosomal recessive		2013
XVII	SPARC		616507	autosomal recessive		2015
XVIII	TENT5A		617952	autosomal recessive		2018
XIX	MBTPS2		301014	X-linked recessive		2016
XX	MESD		618644	autosomal recessive		2019
XXI	KDELR2		619131	autosomal recessive		2020

=== Sillence types ===
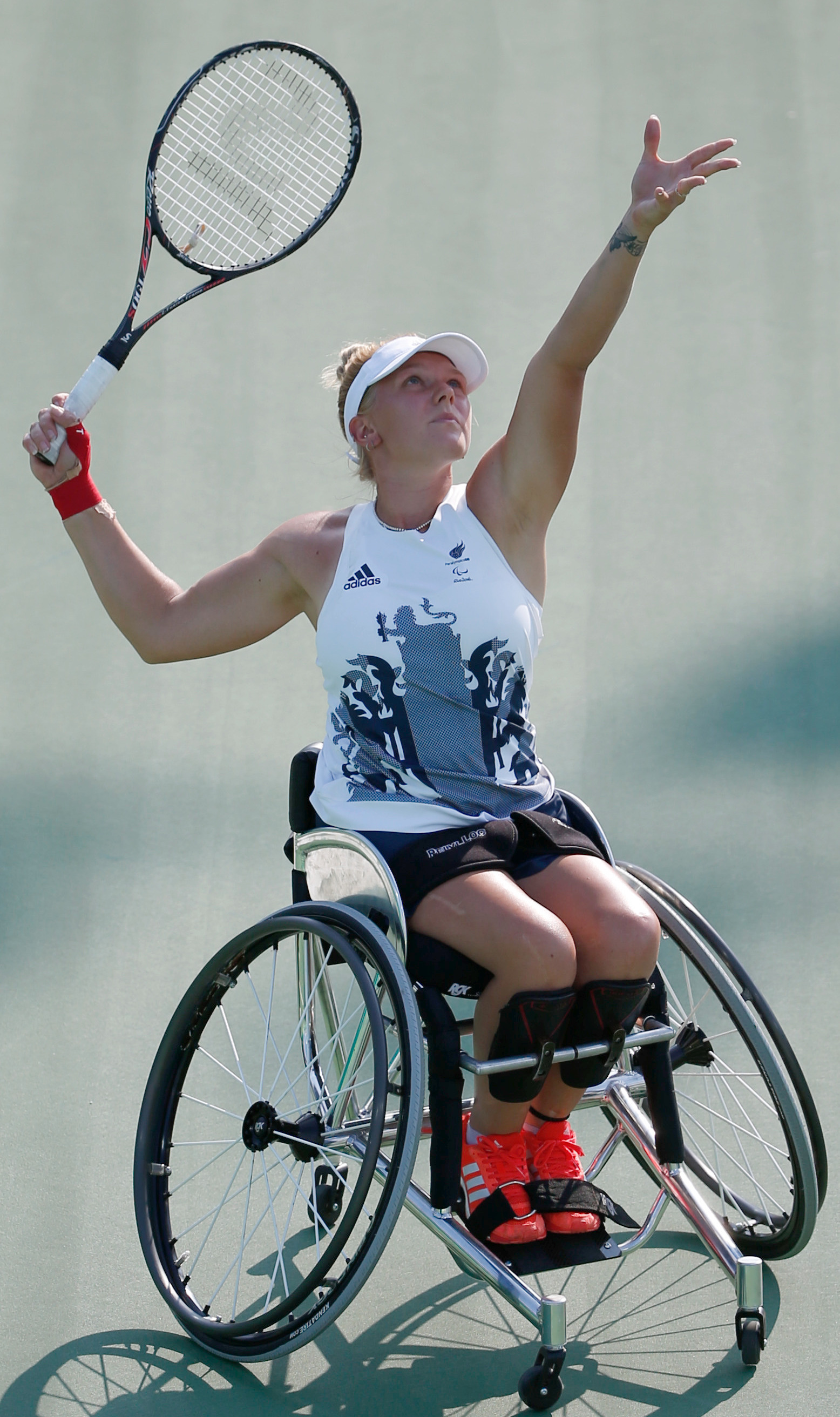
Jordanne Whiley

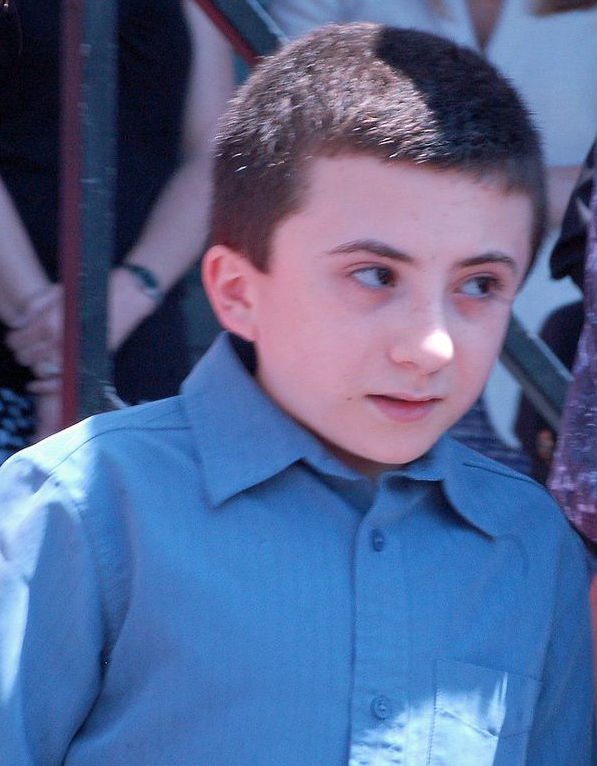
Atticus Shaffer

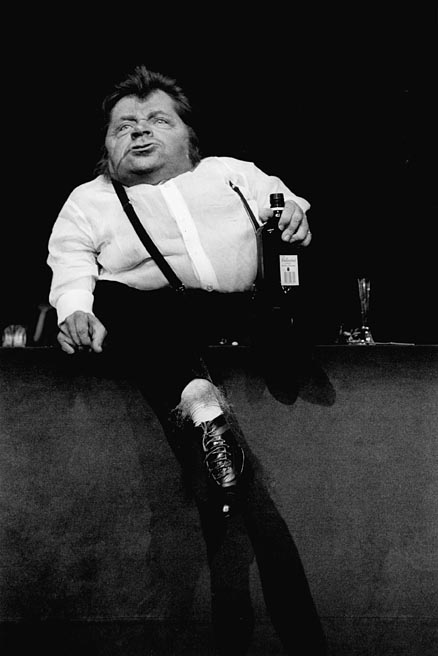
Peter Radtke

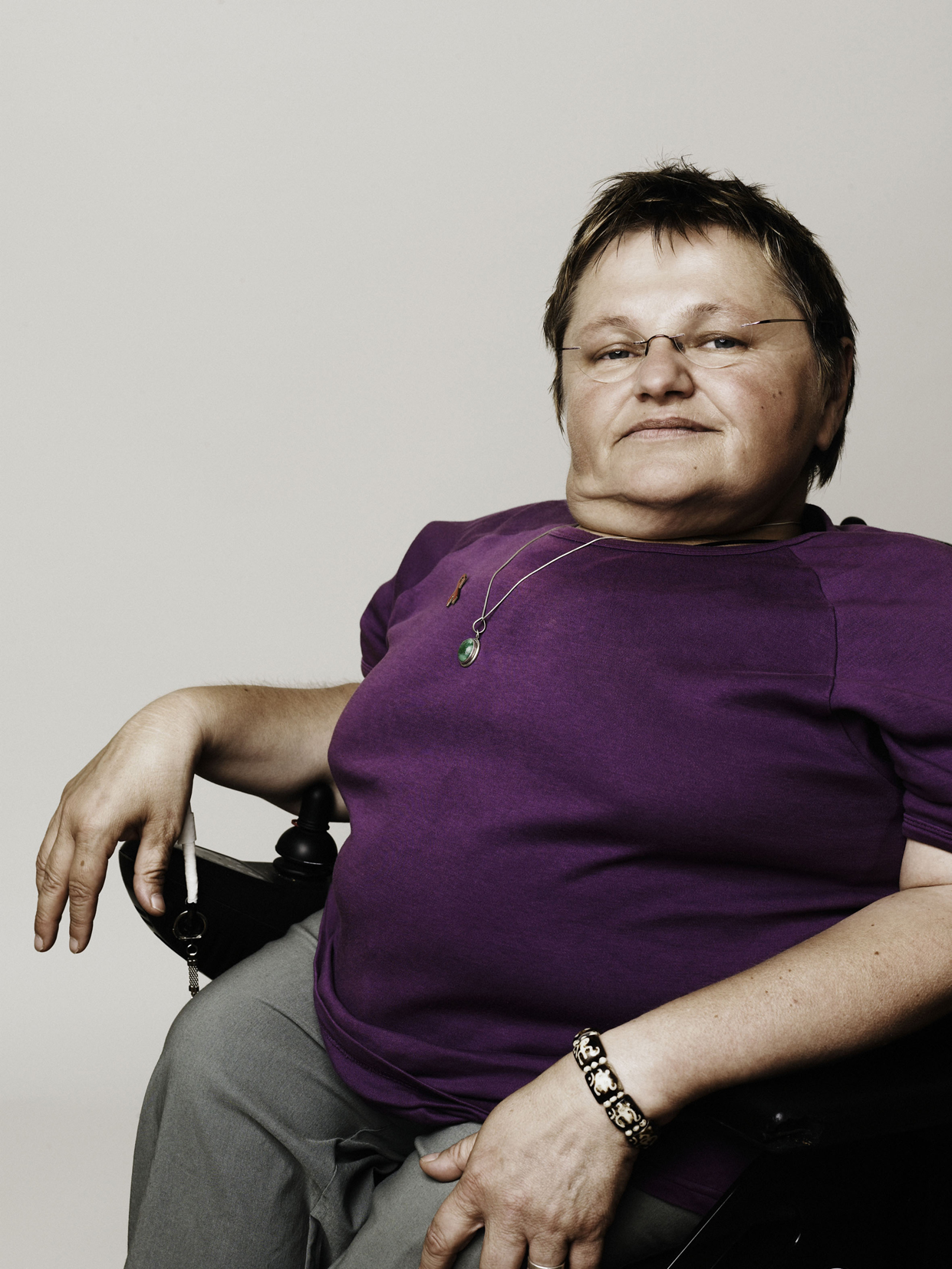
Theresia Haidlmayr

Osteogenesis imperfecta is highly variable, affecting all those above.

Sillence's four types have both a clinical and a genetic meaning; the descriptions below are clinical and can be applied to several genetic types of OI. When used to refer to a genetic as well as a clinical type, it indicates that the clinical symptoms are indeed caused by mutations in the COL1A1 or COL1A2 genes, which are inherited in an autosomal dominant fashion.

==== Type I ====
Collagen is of normal quality but is produced in insufficient quantities. Bones fracture more easily than in the general public, but not as easily as more severe types of OI; there might be scoliosis, albeit mild compared to OI types III and IV, with a lower Cobb angle; the joints may be loose; blue sclerae may be apparent; hearing loss is likely to occur; and there might be a slight decrease in height. Because cases exist missing one or more of these symptoms, OI type I in some cases goes undetected into adulthood.

Some further split type I into types I–A and I–B, defined as being distinguished by the absence (I–A) or presence (I–B) of dentinogenesis imperfecta (opalescent teeth). People with type I generally have a normal lifespan.

==== Type II ====
Collagen is fatally defective at its C-terminus. Most cases result in death shortly after birth, or within the first year of life, due to respiratory failure. Another common cause of death is intracranial bleeds from skull fractures present at, or sustained during or shortly after, birth. In many cases, the newborn already has multiple broken bones at the time of birth. Type II infants also exhibit severe respiratory problems and have severely deformed bones. Sixty percent of infants die less than 24 hours after being born, and survival after the first year is extremely unlikely and normally requires mechanical ventilation. In the rare cases of infants who survive their first year of life, severe developmental and motor delays are seen; neither of two infants studied in 2019, both aged around two years, had achieved head control, and both required a ventilator to breathe.

Type II is also known as the "lethal perinatal" form of OI, and is not compatible with survival into adulthood. Due to similarly severely deformed bones, sometimes infants with severe type III are wrongly initially classified as type II; once long-term survival is shown, they are considered as having type III instead.

==== Type III ====
Collagen quantity is sufficient, but is not of a high enough quality. Clinical differentiation between types III and IV is not always simple, and is further confounded by the fact that an untreated adult with type IV may have worse symptoms than a treated adult with type III; features only found in type III are its progressively deforming nature and the presence of a face with a "triangular" appearance. Another differentiating factor between type III and IV is blue sclerae; in type III, infants commonly have blue sclerae that gradually turn white with age, but blue sclerae are not commonly seen in type IV, although they are seen in 10% of cases.

OI type III causes osteopenic bones that fracture very easily, sometimes even in utero, often leading to hundreds of fractures during a lifetime; early scoliosis that progresses until puberty; dwarfism (a final adult height frequently less than 4 feet or 120 centimetres); loose joints; and possible respiratory problems due to low rib cage volume causing low lung volumes.

Due to the severity of the issues with the bones, neurological and seizure disorders are more likely to develop in type III. Basilar invagination, which puts pressure on the brainstem, may cause or contribute to early death; surgical treatment of it is more complex in OI cases.

==== Type IV ====
Collagen quantity is sufficient, but it is not of a high enough quality. Type IV is for cases of variable severity, which do not fit into either types III or I. While one of Sillence's required characteristics for type IV was having normal sclerae, modern classification allows even those with blue sclerae to fit the criteria for type IV if they meet the other clinical requirements of the type.

In type IV, bone deformity can be mild to severe, bones fracture easily (especially before puberty), dwarfism is common, vertebral collapse and scoliosis are evident, and hearing loss is possible, although uncommon. Type IV OI is mostly defined in contrast to type III and type I, being the clinical classification for patients somewhere in the middle ground between the two. As such, type IV OI is often termed "variable" OI, with the severity of even those in the same family (so, with the same genetic mutation) differing.

Prepubertal bone fracture rates are another way of clinically assessing type IV OI—those with it tend to have fracture rates of ≈1 per year, compared to ≈3 per year for severe OI (type III).

As in type I, some further split type IV into types IV–A and IV–B, defined again by the absence (IV–A) or presence (IV–B) of dentinogenesis imperfecta.

=== Genetically defined types (types V–XXI) ===
As of 2020, fifteen types of OI are defined genetically:

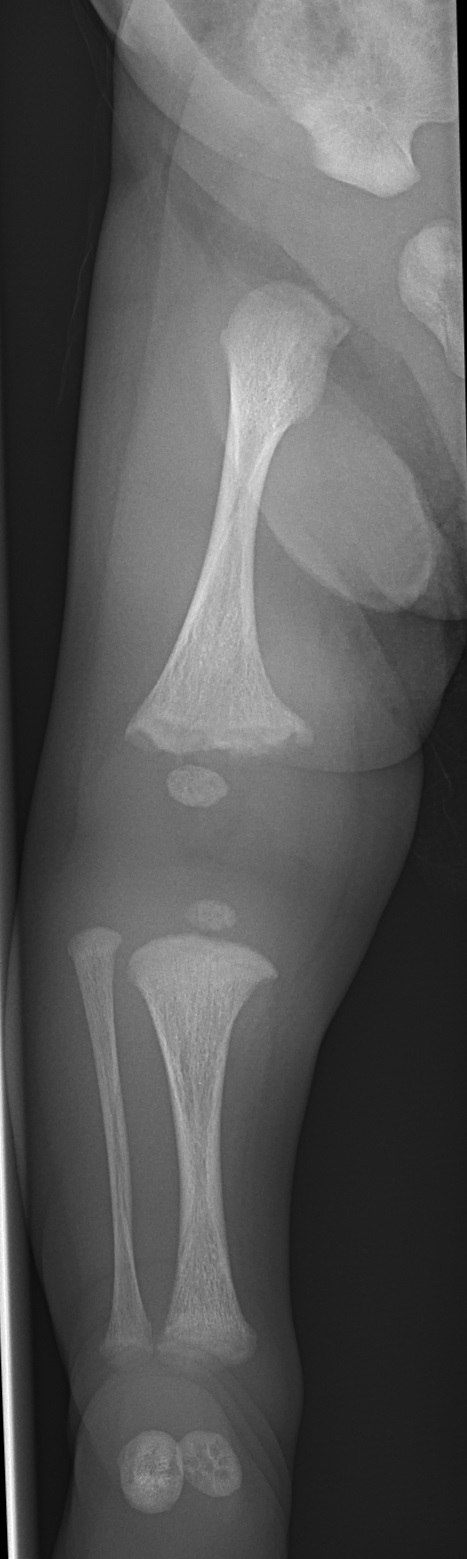
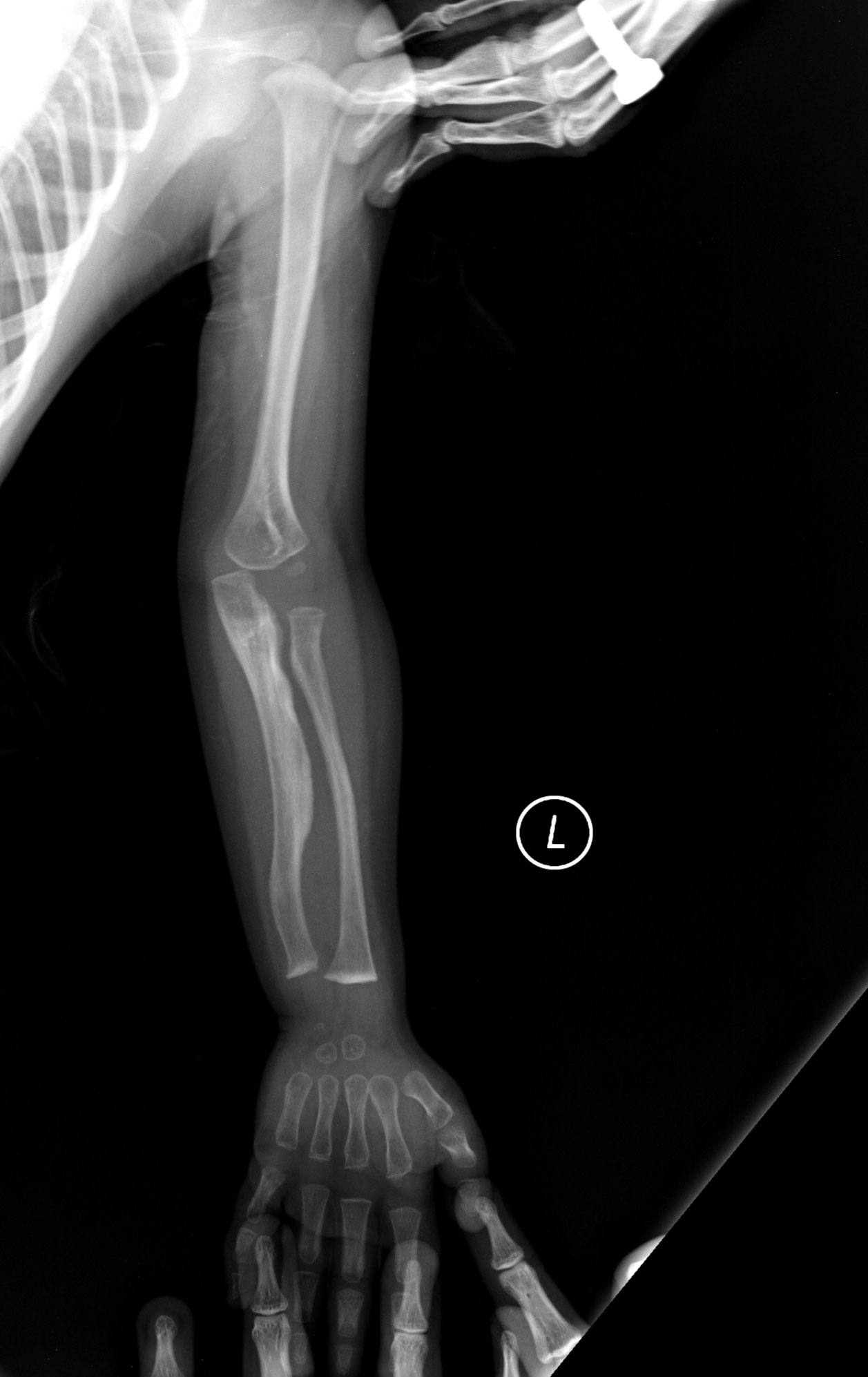
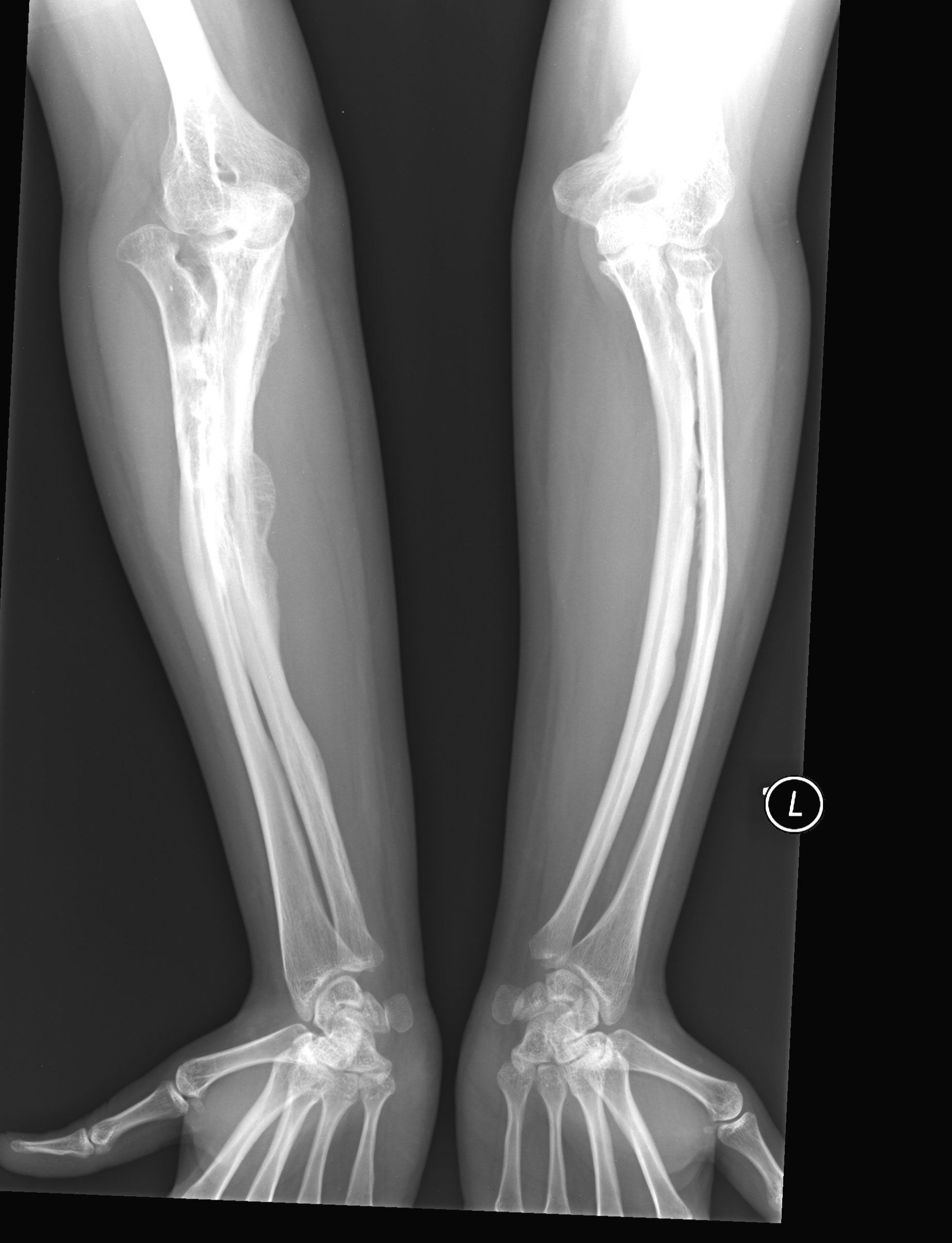
X-rays of three people with OI type V: a newborn, a child, and an adult. Evident are somewhat deformed long bones with widened metaphyses.
- Type V – Having the same clinical features as type IV, it can be clinically distinguished by observing a "mesh-like" appearance to a bone biopsy under a microscope. Type V can be further distinguished from other types of OI by the "V triad": an opaque band (visible on X-ray) adjacent to the growth plates; hypertrophic calluses (abnormally large masses of bony repair tissue) which form at fracture sites during the healing process; and calcification of the interosseous membrane of the forearm, which may make it difficult to turn the wrist.
  Other features of this condition may include pulled elbow, and, as in other types of OI, long bone bowing and hearing loss.
  Cases of this type are caused by mutations in the IFITM5 gene on chromosome 11p15.5. The separation of type V from type IV OI, its clinical type, was initially suggested even before its genetic cause was known, by Glorieux et al. in 2000. Type V is relatively common compared to other genetically defined types of OI—4% of OI patients at the genetics department of the Brazilian Hospital de Clínicas de Porto Alegre were found to have it.
- Type VI – With the same clinical features as type III, it is distinguished by bones which have an appearance similar to that seen in osteomalacia. Type VI is caused by a loss-of-function mutation in the SERPINF1 gene on chromosome 17p13.3.
- Type VII – OI caused by a mutation in the gene CRTAP on chromosome 3p22.3; clinically similar to OI types II and III, depending on affected individual. Type VII was the first recessive OI type confirmed, initially found among First Nations people in Quebec.
- Type VIII – OI caused by a mutation in the gene LEPRE1 on chromosome 1p34.2; clinically similar to OI types II and III, depending on affected individual.
- Type IX – OI caused by homozygous or compound heterozygous mutation in the PPIB gene on chromosome 15q22.31.
- Type X – OI caused by homozygous mutation in the SERPINH1 gene on chromosome 11q13.
- Type XI – OI caused by mutations in FKBP10 on chromosome 17q21. The mutations cause a decrease in the secretion of trimeric procollagen molecules. Other mutations in this gene can cause autosomal recessive Bruck syndrome, which is similar to OI.
- Type XII – OI caused by a frameshift mutation in SP7 on chromosome 12q13.13. This mutation causes bone deformities, fractures, and delayed tooth eruption.
- Type XIII – OI caused by a mutation in the bone morphogenetic protein 1 (BMP1) gene on chromosome 8p21.3. This mutation causes recurrent fractures, high bone mass, and hypermobile joints.
- Type XIV – OI caused by mutations in the TMEM38B gene on chromosome 9q31.2. This mutation causes recurrent fractures and osteopenia, although the disease trajectory is highly variable.
- Type XV – OI caused by homozygous or compound heterozygous mutations in the WNT1 gene on chromosome 12q13.12. It is autosomal recessive.
- Type XVI – OI caused by mutations in the CREB3L1 gene on chromosome 11p11.2. The homozygous mutation causes prenatal onset of recurrent fractures of the ribs and long bones, demineralization, decreased ossification of the skull, and blue sclerae; it is clinically type II or type III. Family members who are heterozygous for OI XVI may have recurrent fractures, osteopenia and blue sclerae.
- Type XVII – OI caused by homozygous mutation in the SPARC gene on chromosome 5q33, causing a defect in the protein osteonectin, which leads to severe disease characterized by generalized platyspondyly, dependence on a wheelchair, and recurrent fractures.
- Type XVIII – OI caused by homozygous mutation in the FAM46A gene on chromosome 6q14.1. Characterized by congenital bowing of the long bones, Wormian bones, blue sclerae, vertebral collapse, and multiple fractures in the first years of life.
- Type XIX – OI caused by hemizygous mutation in the MBTPS2 gene on chromosome Xp22.12. Thus far, OI type XIX is the only known type of OI with an X-linked recessive pattern of inheritance, making it the only type that is more common in males than females. OI type XIX disrupts regulated intramembrane proteolysis, which is critical for healthy bone formation.
- Type XX – OI caused by homozygous mutation in the MESD gene on chromosome 15q25.1. Initial studies of type XX indicate that it may cause global developmental delay, a first among OI types. OI type XX disrupts the Wnt signaling pathway, which is thought to have a role in bone development.
- Type XXI – OI caused by homozygous mutation in the KDELR2 gene on chromosome 7p22.1. Causes disease clinically similar to types II and III, thought to be related to inability of chaperone protein HP47 to unbind from collagen type I, as to do so it needs to bind to the missing ER lumen protein retaining receptor 2 protein encoded by KDELR2.

Given the rapid rate of type discovery, it is extremely likely that there are other genes associated with OI that have yet to be reported.

== Genetics ==
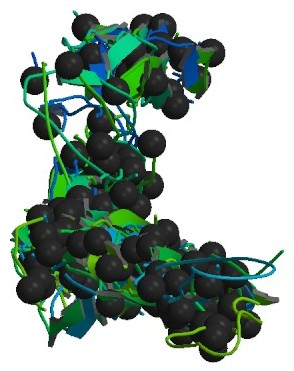
An α1 type I collagen protein

Osteogenesis imperfecta is a group of genetic disorders, all of which cause bone fragility. OI has high genetic heterogeneity, that is, many different genetic mutations lead to the same or similar sets of observable symptoms (phenotypes).

The main causes for developing the disorder are a result of mutations in the COL1A1 and/or COL1A2 genes which are jointly responsible for the production of collagen type I. Approximately 90% of people with OI are heterozygous for mutations in either the COL1A1 or COL1A2 genes. There are several biological factors that are results of the dominant form of OI. These factors include: intracellular stress; abnormal tissue mineralization; abnormal cell-to-cell interactions; abnormal cell-matrix interactions; a compromised cell matrix structure; and, abnormal interaction between non-collagenous proteins and collagen.

Previous research led to the belief that OI was an autosomal dominant disorder with few other variations in genomes. However, with the lowering of the cost of DNA sequencing in the wake of 2003's Human Genome Project, autosomal recessive forms of the disorder have been identified. Recessive forms of OI relate heavily to defects in the collagen chaperones responsible for the production of procollagen and the assembly of the related proteins. Examples of collagen chaperones that are defective in patients with recessive forms of OI include chaperone HSP47 (Cole-Carpenter syndrome) and FKBP65. Mutations in these chaperones result in an improper folding pattern in the collagen 1 proteins, which causes the recessive form of the disorder. There are three significant types of OI that are a result of mutations in the collagen prolyl 3-hydroxylation complex (components CRTAP, P3H1, and CyPB). These components are responsible for the modification of collagen α1(l)Pro986. Mutations in other genes such as SP7, SERPINF1, TMEM38B and BMP1 can also lead to irregularly formed proteins and enzymes that result in other recessive types of osteogenesis imperfecta.

Defects in the proteins pigment epithelium-derived factor (PEDF) and bone-restricted interferon-induced transmembrane protein (BRIL) are the causes of type V and VI osteogenesis imperfecta. Defects in these proteins lead to defective bone mineralization which causes the characteristic brittle bones of osteogenesis imperfecta. A single point mutation in the 5′ untranslated region (5′ UTR) of the IFITM5 gene, which encodes BRIL, is linked directly to OI type V.

In the rare case of type XIX, first discovered in 2016, OI is inherited as an X-linked genetic disorder, with its detrimental effects resulting ultimately from a mutation in the gene MBTPS2. Genetic research is ongoing, and it is uncertain when all the genetic causes of OI will be identified, as the number of genes that need to be tested to rule out the disorder continue to increase.

In a study of 37 families, a 1.3% chance was found that OI recurs in multiple siblings born to two unaffected parents—this is a much higher rate than would be expected if all such recurrences were de novo. The cause is genetic mosaicism; that is, some of, or most of, the germ cells of one parent have a dominant form of OI, but not enough of their somatic cells do to cause symptoms or obvious disability in the parent—the parent's different cells have two (or more) sets of slightly different DNA. It has been clinically observed that ≈5–10% of cases of OI types II and III are attributable to genetic mosaicism.

== Pathophysiology ==
People with OI are either born with defective connective tissue, born without the ability to make it in sufficient quantities, or, in the rarest genetic types, born with deficiencies in other aspects of bone formation such as chaperone proteins, the Wnt signaling pathway, the BRIL protein, et cetera. In type I the collagen's structure itself is normal, it is just its quantity that is low. Types II, III and IV are usually, but not always, related to a deficiency of type I collagen. One possible deficiency arises from an amino acid substitution of glycine to a bulkier amino acid, such as alanine, in the collagen protein's triple helix structure. The larger amino acid side-chains lead to steric effects that creates a bulge in the collagen complex, which in turn influences both the molecular nanomechanics and the interaction between molecules, which are both compromised. Depending on both the location of the substitution and the amino acid being used instead, different effects are seen which account for the type diversity in OI despite the same two collagen genes being responsible for most cases. Replacements of glycine with serine or cysteine are seen less often in fatal type II OI, while replacements with valine, aspartic acid, glutamic acid, or arginine are seen more often.

At a larger scale, the relationship between the collagen fibrils and hydroxyapatite crystals to form bone is altered, causing brittleness. Bone fractures occur because the stress state within collagen fibrils is altered at the locations of mutations, where locally larger shear forces lead to rapid failure of fibrils even at moderate loads because the homogeneous stress state normally found in healthy collagen fibrils is lost. OI is therefore a multi-scale phenomenon, where defects at the smallest levels of tissues (genetic, nano, micro) domino to affect the macro level of tissues.

== Diagnosis ==
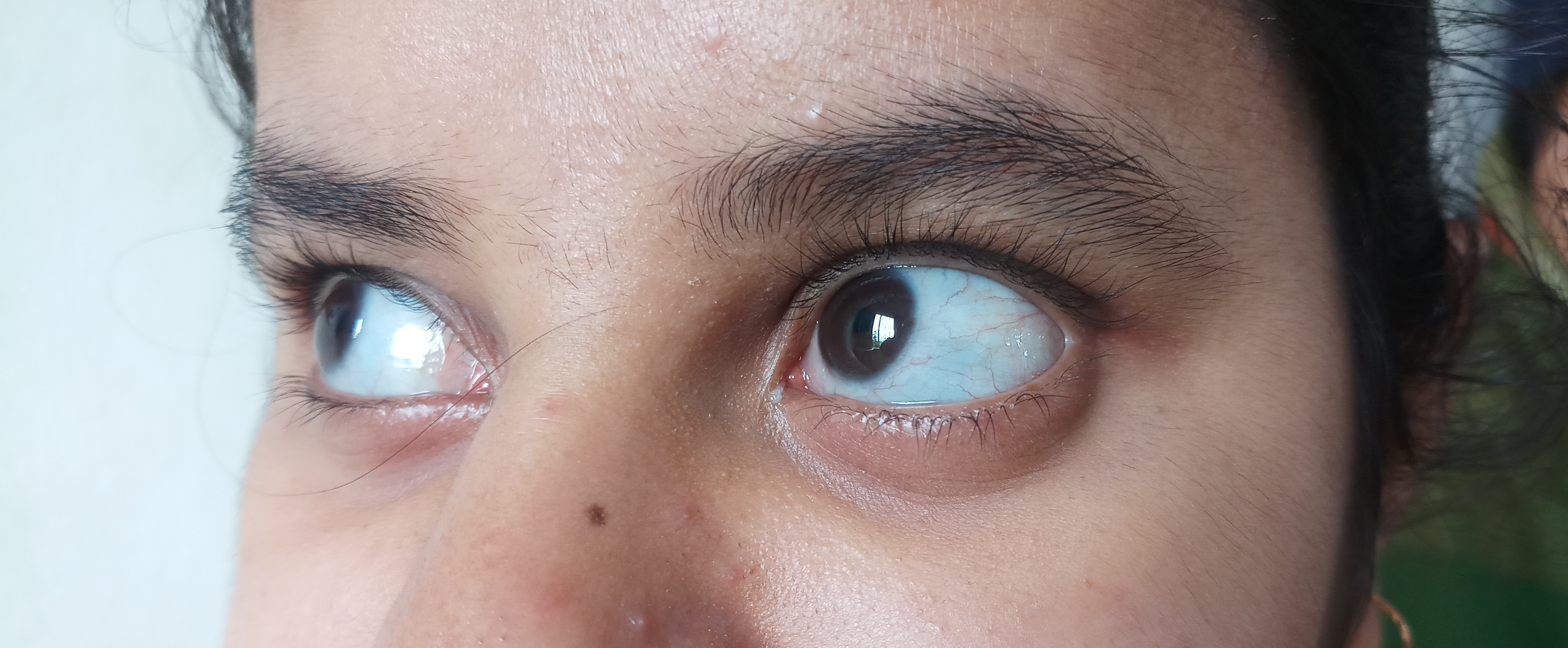
Blue sclerae in a person with osteogenesis imperfecta

Diagnosis is typically based on medical imaging, such as plain X-rays, and symptoms. In severe OI, signs on medical imaging include abnormalities in all extremities and the spine. As X-rays are often insensitive to the comparatively smaller bone density loss associated with type I OI, DEXA scans may be needed.

An OI diagnosis can be confirmed through DNA or collagen protein analysis, but in many cases, the occurrence of bone fractures with little trauma and the presence of other clinical features such as blue sclerae are sufficient for a diagnosis. A skin biopsy can be performed to determine the structure and quantity of type I collagen. While DNA testing can confirm the diagnosis, it cannot absolutely exclude it because not all mutations causing OI are yet known and/or tested for. OI type II is often diagnosed by ultrasound during pregnancy, where already multiple fractures and other characteristic features may be visible. Relative to control, OI cortical bone shows increased porosity, canal diameter, and connectivity in micro-computed tomography. OI can also be detected before birth by using an in vitro genetic testing technique such as amniocentesis.

=== Genetic testing ===
To determine whether osteogenesis imperfecta is present, genetic sequencing of the most common problematic genes, COL1A1, COL1A2, and IFITM5, may be done; if no mutation is found yet OI is still suspected, the other 10+ genes known to cause OI may be tested. Duplication and deletion testing is also suggested to parents who suspect their child has OI. The presence of frameshift mutations caused by duplications and deletions is generally the cause of increased severity of disease.

=== Differential diagnosis ===
An important differential diagnosis of OI is child abuse, as both may present to a clinician with multiple fractures in various stages of healing. Differentiating them can be difficult, especially when no other characteristic features of OI are present. This can become an issue in court; in the United States, several child abuse cases were resolved with a finding that osteogenesis imperfecta was the true cause of a child's fractures, leading to lawsuits seeking redress such as Alice Velasquez, et al. v. United States.

Other differential diagnoses include rickets and osteomalacia, both caused by malnutrition, as well as rare skeletal/connective tissue syndromes such as Bruck syndrome, hypophosphatasia, geroderma osteodysplasticum, Wormian bone-multiple fractures-dentinogenesis imperfecta-skeletal dysplasia syndrome and Ehlers–Danlos syndrome. Various forms of osteoporosis, such as iatrogenic osteoporosis, idiopathic juvenile osteoporosis, disuse osteoporosis and exercise-related osteoporosis should also be considered when OI is suspected.

== Treatment ==
There is no cure for osteogenesis imperfecta. Maintaining a healthy lifestyle by exercising and avoiding smoking can help prevent fractures. Treatment may include care of broken bones, pain medication, physical therapy, mobility aids such as braces or wheelchairs, and surgery.

Judging the success or failure of treatment can be difficult in OI patients, as decreased bone fracture rates may just be coincidental. While these rates are often used in medical studies to judge treatment efficacy, a Norwegian study of fifteen people with OI emphasized that they feel doctors should consider the whole patient and not just fracture rates.

=== Acute bone fracture care ===
Bone fractures are treated in individuals with osteogenesis imperfecta in much the same way as they are treated in the general population; OI bone heals at the same rate as non-OI bone. A greater emphasis is placed on using lightweight materials to immobilize the fracture, as in moderate or severe types of OI, using heavy casts, such as hip spica casts, can cause fractures at the bones at the boundaries of the cast, as well as generalized osteopenia. The lightweight cast or splint is then replaced with a removable orthosis after a few weeks and once evidence of union is seen on X-ray. To prevent a nonunion or malunion, all fractures should be immobilized, even if the fracture seems trivial (microfracture), as people with OI are at greater risk of nonunion.

Bone infections secondary to fractures are treated as and when they occur with the appropriate antibiotics and antiseptics, as in the general population.

=== Medications ===
==== Bisphosphonates ====
Pamidronate

In 1998, an initial observational trial demonstrated the effectiveness of intravenous pamidronate, a bisphosphonate which had previously been used in adults to treat osteoporosis. In severe OI, this trial showed that pamidronate reduced bone pain, prevented new vertebral fractures, reshaped previously fractured vertebral bodies, and reduced the number of long-bone fractures.

Although oral bisphosphonates are more convenient and cheaper, they are not absorbed as well, and intravenous bisphosphonates are generally more effective, although this is under study. Some studies have found oral and intravenous bisphosphonates, such as oral alendronate and intravenous pamidronate, equivalent. In a 2013 double-blind trial of children with mild OI, oral risedronate increased bone mineral densities, and reduced nonvertebral fractures. However, it did not decrease new vertebral fractures. A Cochrane review in 2016 concluded that though bisphosphonates seem to improve bone mineral density, it is uncertain whether this leads either to a reduction in bone fractures or improvement in the quality of life of individuals with osteogenesis imperfecta. Even in trials with as many as 125 children, no causal link has been found between bisphosphonates and decreased fracture rates; placebo controlled trials were also unable to prove that they brought about increased strength, motor control or lower pain levels.

Bisphosphonates are not as effective at increasing the bone mineral density of adults.

==== Nutritional supplements ====
OI is a genetic disorder and is not caused by insufficient intake of any vitamin or mineral; supplementation cannot cure OI. Nevertheless, people with OI tend to be severely deficient in vitamin D at much higher rates than the general population, and the cause of this is not well understood. The severity of the deficiency and the likelihood of its occurrence is thought to be related to severity of OI. Vitamin D supplementation may be recommended, at least until levels of 25(OH)D_{3} in a patient's blood return to normal. Vitamin D deficiency is also a concern as it may decrease the benefit of bisphosphanates.

=== Surgery ===
A surgery of any type inherently carries more risks when done on a patient who has (especially moderate to severe) OI. Skeletal deformities and dentinogenesis imperfecta may hinder access to the airway. Use of, and weaning off of, mechanical ventilation is also more challenging to carry out on patients with OI. During the procedure itself or the healing process, defective OI collagen may lead to bleeding diatheses.

The safety of anesthesia is also of more concern among patients with OI, with anesthetic complications 5.6x more likely to occur when the patient has OI type III. A unique concern of anesthesia in OI is perioperative fracture—fractures sustained due to patient transfer and airway access techniques that, while routine when a patient's bones are strong, may cause injury with brittle OI bones. As an example, due to a 1972 report of a humerus fracture from a sphygmomanometer cuff sustained in an OI patient during surgery, blood pressure monitoring protocols are often modified for patients with OI, with neonatal size cuffs and machine settings being used even in adults; further, the least deformed of the patient's limbs is preferred to receive the cuff.

==== Rodding ====
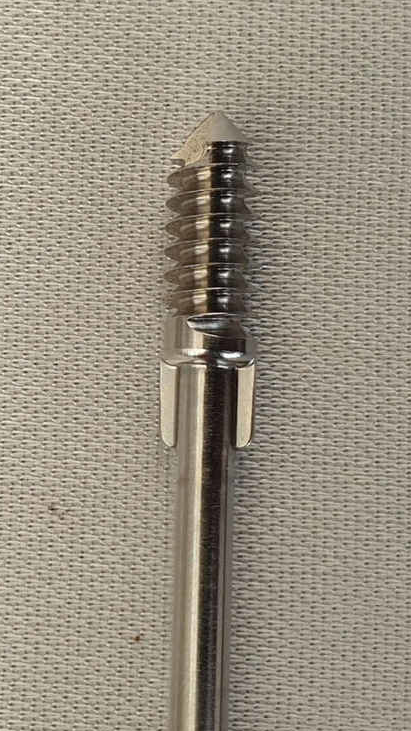
The tip of a modern Fassier–Duval telescoping intramedullary rod, manufactured by Pega Medical for use in osteogenesis imperfecta.

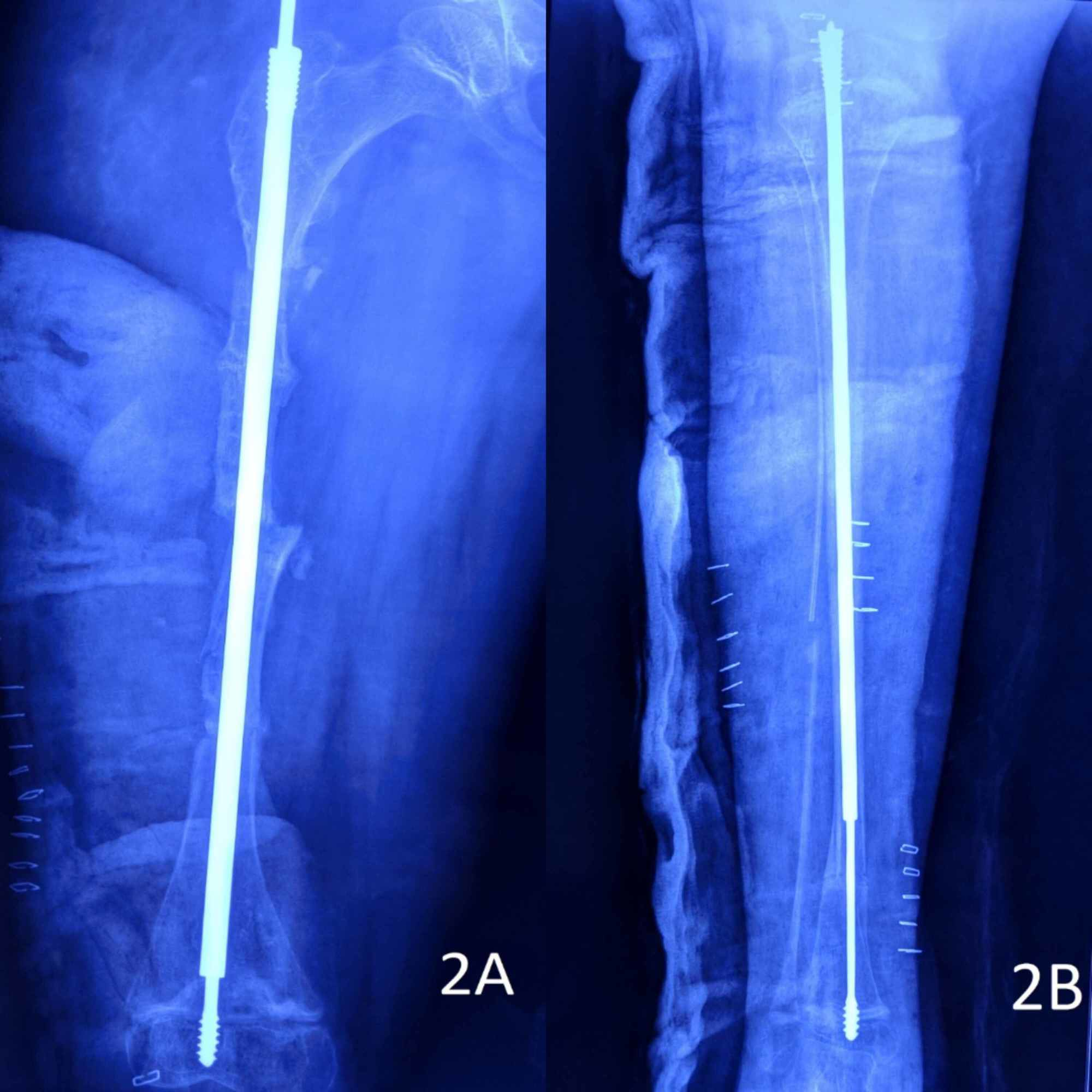
The right femur (2A) and tibia (2B) of a 10-year-old girl immediately after her rodding surgery, which involved implantation of the same type of telescoping intramedullary rod photographed at left. Note the bone fragmentation, an important step in the procedure, clearly visible on the X-ray of the femur.

Metal rods can be surgically inserted in the long bones to improve strength, a procedure developed by Harold A. Sofield when he was Chief of Staff at Chicago's Shriners Hospitals for Children, a hospital that offers orthopedic care and surgery to children regardless of their family's ability to pay. Large numbers of children with OI came to Shriners, and Sofield experimented with various methods to strengthen their bones. In 1959, with Edward A. Millar [sic], Sofield wrote a seminal article describing a three-part surgery that seemed radical at the time: precisely breaking the bones ("fragmentation"), putting the resulting bone fragments in a straight line ("realignment"), then placing metal rods into the intramedullary canals of the long bones to stabilize and strengthen them ("rod fixation"). His treatment proved useful for increasing the mobility of people with OI, and it has been adopted throughout the world—it became standard surgical treatment for severe OI by 1979, in which year David Sillence found that ≈2/3 of the patients he surveyed with OI type III had undergone at least one rodding surgery.

Rodding surgery is often done with the hope that it will offer a path to ambulation, walking, to patients with moderate or severe OI. A 2020 review in The Journal of Bone and Joint Surgery (JB&JS) found it remains broadly popular: ≈2/3 of people with OI types III and IV (severe OI) have undergone some form of rodding surgery in their lives, at a mean age of 4 1/10 and 7 1/2 years respectively; one possible explanation for a tendency towards earlier intervention in type III is that one half of affected children could not walk at all without the surgery, as their limbs were more bowed, so surgery was sought sooner.

In those with type III OI who had undergone rodding surgery, 79.5% had the femurs and tibias of both legs rodded. The most common form of rods used are intramedullary (IM) rods, some of which, such as the Fassier–Duval IM rod, are telescoping, meaning that they are designed to grow as the child grows, in an attempt to avoid the necessity of revision surgeries. Telescoping IM rods are widely used, and the common Fassier–Duval IM rod is designed to be used to rod the femur, tibia, and humerus. The surgery involves breaking the long bones in between one and three (or more) places, then fixing the rod alongside the bone to keep it straight.

While telescoping IM rods are intended to grow along with both the femur and tibia in developing children; surgeons have a preference to use non-telescoping IM rods, such as Rush rods, in the tibia, which grows less comparatively—the JB&JS review found that while 69.7% of femurs were treated with telescoping IM rods, only 36.9% of tibiae were.

While the review in the JB&JS was able to correlate receiving rodding surgery with greater mobility across all types of OI, in patients with type IV, the surgery did not decrease the incidence of broken bones as compared to non-rodded patients—while type IV patients with rodded tibiae experienced 0.93 tibia fractures per year, patients with natural tibiae experienced only 0.81. However, in patients with type III, rodding surgery decreased the average number of tibia fractures per year from 0.84 to 0.57.

==== Spinal ====
Spinal fusion can be performed either as a preventative measure or to correct existing scoliosis, although the inherent fragility of OI bone makes this operation more complex in OI patients than it does with patients who have adolescent idiopathic scoliosis, but normal bone density. Despite the risks, however, three Nemours–duPont orthopedic surgeons who specialize in surgical intervention for osteogenesis imperfecta recommend operating if the curve is greater than 50° after a child is past peak height velocity, as the spine's curve can continue to worsen even into adulthood.

Due to the risk involved, the same surgeons recommend that surgery for basilar impressions and basilar invaginations should only be carried out if the pressure being exerted on the spinal cord and brain stem is causing actual neurological symptoms. Once basilar invagination has become symptomatic, only surgery can halt or reverse the progression of neurological deficits.

=== Physical therapy ===
Physical therapy is generally recommended, however individualized protocols are required due to the variability of OI. Physical therapy is used to strengthen muscles, improve motility, improve flexibility, and help with weight maintenance, although it must be done in a gentle manner to minimize the risk of bone fracture. In people with OI, exercise often involves water aerobics, light resistance exercises, and walking, if the patient is able. However, even in patients with mild OI, contact sports, as well as activities likely to put unnecessary stress on the joints, such as jumping, are contraindicated due to the risks they pose.

Individuals with more limited mobility are encouraged to change positions regularly throughout the day; people who sit in a wheelchair most or all of the day are recommended to get out of it every two hours, as a form of exercise, to decrease stiffness, and to prevent pressure ulcers.

Individuals with moderate to severe OI, who require assistive mobility devices and adapted vehicles, face significant barriers to access wheelchair-accessible pools or gyms—they either may not have any in their area, nor the means to get there. Obesity may be more likely to present among those with severe OI, (especially after the age of 20,) and can, in some, cause further declines in mobility.

Tilt table whole body vibration may also be done to increase the mobility of long-term immobilized (bedridden) patients with OI; in at least two cases, it helped bedridden children to be able to sit upright.

=== Teeth ===
More than 1 in 2 people with OI also have dentinogenesis imperfecta (DI)—a congenital abnormality in the formation of dentin, one of the four major components of the human tooth. Dental treatment may pose a challenge as a result of the various deformities, skeletal and dental, due to OI. Children with OI should go for a dental check-up as soon as their teeth erupt; this may minimize tooth structure loss as a result of abnormal dentine, and they should be monitored regularly to preserve their teeth and oral health.

Many people with OI are treated with bisphosphonates, and there are several possible related complications with dental procedures, for example, medication-related osteonecrosis of the jaw (MRONJ). However, no report of bisphosphonate-related MRONJ in either a child or adult with OI was found in a 2016 Cochrane review of the safety and efficacy of bisphosphonates for OI.

=== In development ===
==== Monoclonal antibodies ====
Monoclonal antibodies have long been considered for OI, but as of 2021, such therapy has not been approved for OI, neither in the European Union nor in the United States. Thus, it is unclear whether they are safe or effective. Among the monoclonal antibodies that have been studied are romosozumab (targets sclerostin, by Amgen), fresolimumab (TGF-β, Sanofi), blosozumab (sclerostin, Lilly), and setrusumab (sclerostin, begun by Novartis).

Setrusumab, formerly known as BPS-804, is a monoclonal antibody that targets sclerostin, and has been studied in OI specifically more than any of the others. In the body, sclerostin binds to the LRP5 and LRP6 receptors, resulting in inhibition of the Wnt signaling pathway. This decreases bone formation, and is not a problem when a person has healthy bones. It is thought, though, that decreasing the concentration of sclerostin in the body may lead to the formation of more bone, and that is the premise as to why monoclonal antibodies that reduce the concentrations of naturally occurring sclerostin may help strengthen OI bone. While setrusumab was first developed at the pharmaceutical company Novartis, Novartis sold its rights to patent the drug to Mereo Biopharma in 2015, who has continued its development in conjunction with Ultragenyx. In 2019, Mereo announced that it had concluded collecting data for its phase II-B trial of setrusumab; the study was completed on 12 November 2020. Despite the trial data failing to show improvements in bone density on QCT scans, its primary goal, there were improvements on DXA scans. In a September 2020 press release, Mereo said it was seeking to do a phase III trial in 2021, and had received a Rare Pediatric Disease (RPD) designation from the US Food and Drug Administration (FDA).

Romosozumab, which is also a monoclonal antibody targeting sclerostin, is an approved drug in the US and EU for the treatment of osteoporosis. The pharmaceutical industry analyst Evercore has remarked that "it could wipe out setrusumab's economics", as romosozumab is priced more cheaply than a drug for a rare disease would be, claiming that it will be "vital" to Ultragenyx's profit margins to prove its setrusumab is more efficacious than romosozumab for OI. A clinical trial evaluating romosozumab's efficacy in OI began in September 2020 and as of September 2021 is ongoing. Ultragenyx predicts that its phase 2/3 trials for setrusumab will be completed in 2026.

== Prevention ==
Preimplantation genetic diagnosis is a medical procedure that families with OI can undergo to guarantee non-affected offspring.

As a genetic disorder, the mainstay of twenty-first-century prevention of osteogenesis imperfecta is based on preventing affected individuals from being born in the first place. Genetic counseling can help patients and their families determine what types of screening, if any, are right for their situation. Patients can consider preimplantation genetic diagnosis after in vitro fertilization to select fertilized embryos that are not affected. Common mutations which cause OI may be caught by exome sequencing and whole genome sequencing. If a pregnancy is already in progress, the procedure of amniocentesis may be undergone to see if the fetus is affected. If affected, it is up to the family to consider whether or not they want to terminate the pregnancy and try again—raising questions of medical ethics and a woman's right to choose.

Without intervention, patients with the most common mutations causing osteogenesis imperfecta have a 50% chance per gestation of passing on the disorder, as these mutations are inherited in an autosomal dominant pattern of Mendelian inheritance. Those with the rare autosomal recessive forms of OI have a 25% chance of passing on the disorder. Genetic testing of the affected members of the family can be used to determine which inheritance pattern applies.

As OI type I may be difficult to detect in a newborn child, the cord blood of the child can be tested to determine if it has been passed on, if the family has already rejected the more invasive genetic screening methods. In more severe cases, the diagnosis may be able to be done via ultrasound, especially if OI is already a possibility. An ethical concern with prenatal screening for OI often arises when parents inquire as to how severely affected their child will be—such questions are as yet difficult to answer conclusively.

If a non-affected person has already had a child with OI, there is a greater likelihood (although still quite remote) that their future children will have OI due to genetic mosaicism.

The disability rights critique of prenatal screening for OI, held by some bioethicists and some affected individuals, negatively compares it to eugenics, with even those not opposed to abortion opposing selective abortions on the ethical ground that their existence betrays the belief that the lives of those with OI are "less worth living [and] less valuable".

== Prognosis ==
The prognosis of osteogenesis imperfecta depends entirely on its type (see § Classification).

=== Life expectancy ===
In the mild form of the disorder, type I, the life expectancy of patients is near that of the general population. In type II, however, patients only very rarely live past the age of two, and typically die in their first weeks of life. Assessment of the life expectancy of patients with types III and IV is more complicated, as lifestyle choices can cause fatally traumatic injuries that would not have otherwise occurred, or not been fatal in the general population. Life expectancy in type IV OI is thought to be close to normal, but in type III it is lower than in the general population.

A 2016 study of data in Denmark's National Patient Register found that across all types of OI, all-cause mortality was three times higher, leading to a loss of around seven years in females and nine years in males. A 1996 study published in the British Medical Journal found that mortality in type III OI is significantly higher, with many patients dying in their 20's, 30's, and 40's; patients who survive to the age of 10 were further found to have longer life expectancy than newborns.

=== Mobility ===
People with mild (type I) OI as adults need few pieces of adaptive equipment, although in infancy they reach motor milestones at a significant delay compared to the general population.

With adaptive equipment such as crutches, motorized wheelchairs, splints, reach extenders, and/or modifications to the home, many individuals with moderate to severe OI can achieve or maintain a significant degree of independence. With treatment and physical therapy, the maximum levels of mobility are expected to be unassisted community walking for type I, household or exercise walking for type III, and household or community walking for type IV; due to the variability of OI between individuals, mobility achieved varies and may be below this expected maximum.

== Epidemiology ==
In the United States, the incidence of osteogenesis imperfecta is estimated to be one per 20,000 live births. An estimated 20,000 to 50,000 people are affected by OI in the United States.

The most common types are I, II, III, and IV, while the rest are very rare. Type I is the most common and has been reported to be around three times more common than type II. The prevalence of types III and IV is less certain. In a 1989 study in Denmark, type I was found to comprise 71% of cases and type II 12% of cases, with other types comprising the other 17%. In a 2015 study in Sweden, type I was nearly six times more common than type III and nearly four times more common than type IV.

Most people with OI receive it from a parent, but in many cases, it is a brand new (de novo or "sporadic") mutation in a family. Among a study of patients with survivable types of OI, OI type III is most often de novo (85%), followed by type IV (50%) and type I (34%).

Some populations can have a higher incidence of OI than would be otherwise expected if they have a larger-than-average number of carriers of the recessive forms of the disease.

== History ==
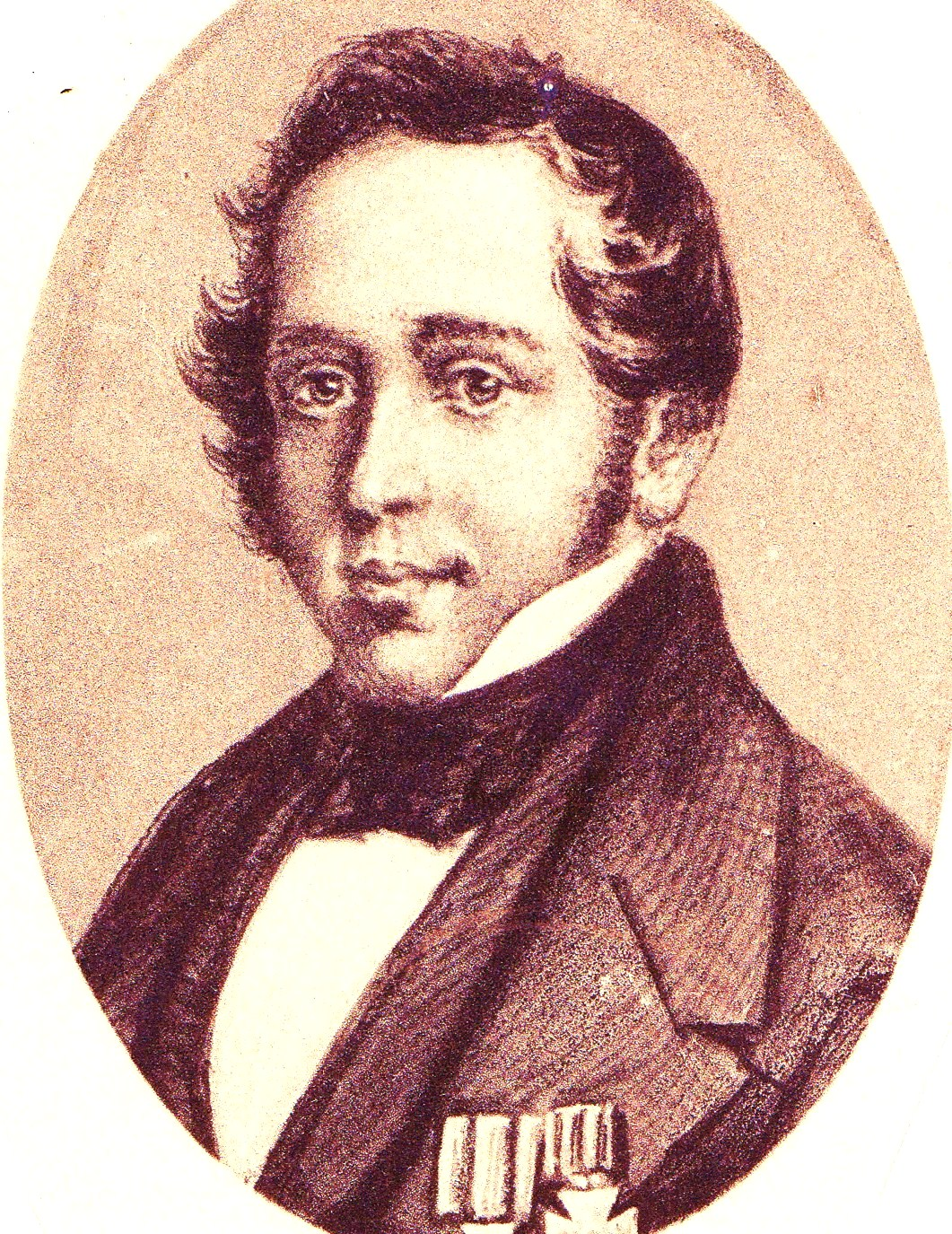
Dr. Willem Vrolik (born 1801) coined the term "osteogenesis imperfecta" in 1849.

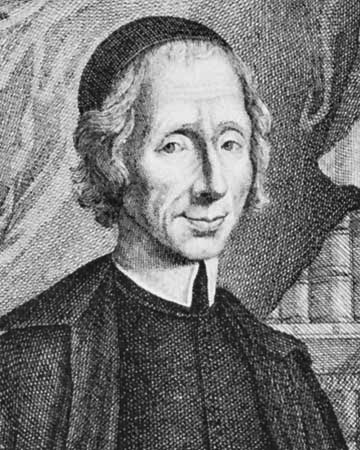
Nicolas de Malebranche (born 1638) is thought to be the first person to attempt to describe the clinical features of OI.

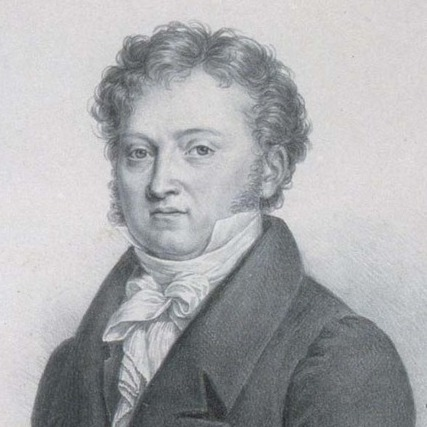
Where Vrolik would describe what is now type II OI, in 1833 Dr. Jean Lobstein (born 1777) was the first to describe what is now called type I OI.

The condition, or types of it, has had various other names over the years and in different nations; "osteogenesis imperfecta" has, however, been the most widely accepted name for the condition since the late 20th century. Among some of the most common alternatives are "fragilitas ossium"; "Ekman–Lobstein syndrome", and "Vrolik syndrome", both eponyms; and, the colloquialism, "brittle bone disease".

=== Earliest recorded cases ===
OI has been identified in an ancient Egyptian infant mummified in around 1000 BC, originally dismissed by archaeologists as containing the remains of a monkey. The Norse king Ivar the Boneless, who lived c. 800 CE, is speculated to have had OI as well.

Nicolas de Malebranche is often credited as being the first person to describe the physical characteristics of OI in his 1688 book The Search after Truth, in which he describes a man who has had his "bones broken in the places a murderer's would be" all his life. His confident description of the pathology of the disorder, however, which creates what he termed «enfants monstrueux» ("monstrous children"), is scientifically void—he wrote that it was due to the mother's antepartum viewership of a public execution by breaking wheel.

The earliest modern scientific studies of OI began in 1788 by Olof Jakob Ekman, who described the condition, which he termed "osteomalacia congenital", in his doctoral thesis and mentioned cases of it going back to 1678, all in the same family, through three generations. Ekman's description of the condition mentioned dwarfism, bone fragility, and bowing of the long bones. In 1831, Edmund Axmann gave a detailed description of it in himself and his two brothers, being the first to mention blue sclerae as a characteristic sign of OI. Jean Lobstein first described the mild form of the condition, today known as type I, in 1833, calling it "osteopsathyrosis idiopathica".

It was not until 1912 that hearing loss was positively recognized as a symptom of OI, first mentioned in a brief paper by the English physician Charles Allen Adair-Dighton.

=== Of the term ===
Excerpts from Vrolik W (1849):

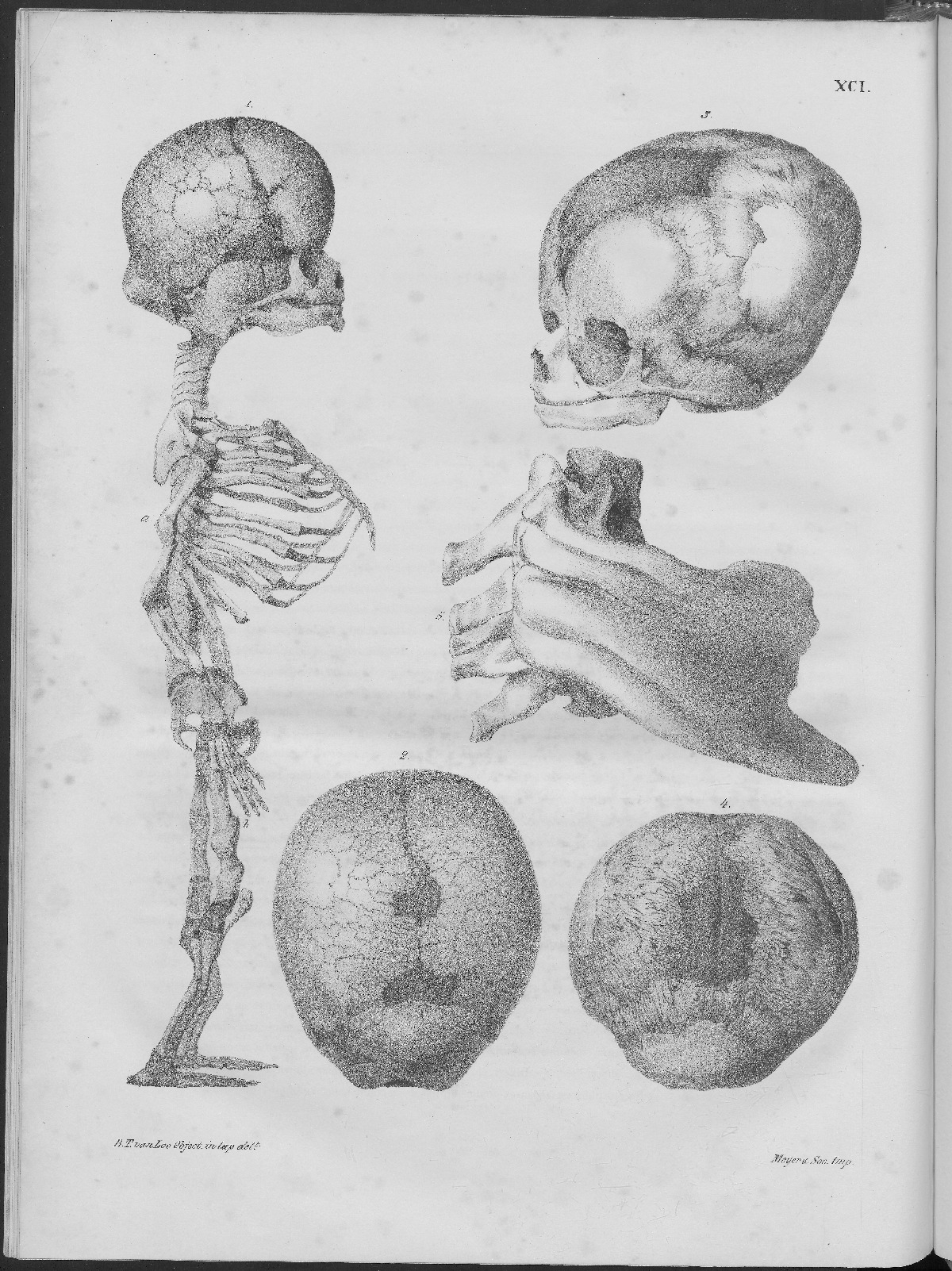
A drawing of the remains Vrolik examined while describing what he called "osteogenesis imperfecta".

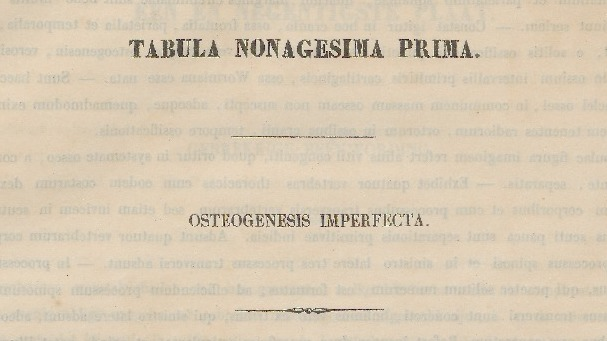
The first appearance of "osteogenesis imperfecta" in print appears on the page afterwards.

Willem Vrolik, a Dutch anatomist who was also curator of the "Museum Vrolikianum", which made him privy to many specimens of bodies having birth defects, coined the term "osteogenesis imperfecta" in his bilingual Latin and Dutch language book on teratology, Illustrations of Human and Mammalian Embryogenesis, first published in 1849.

Included is a description of the remains of an infant who had what is now known as perinatally fatal OI type II (as verified in a 1998 re-examination of the remains by Baljet et al.). The remains were first given to Vrolik's father, who could not make sense of them. Vrolik described poorly mineralized bones, bowed long bones, and fractures in various states of healing. Vrolik correctly determined that what he termed OI in the infant was not caused by secondary rickets, but a congenital abnormality causing primary osteopenia; he theorized this was due to a lack of "intrinsic generative energy".

=== Of its classification ===
Classification of OI has also evolved as scientific understanding of it has improved. Before the advent of modern genetic testing, OI was classified in two broad groups: osteogenesis imperfecta congenita, and osteogenesis imperfecta tarda, a division first proposed by the German physician E. Looser in 1906. Congenita was used to describe the modern clinical types II, III, and some cases of IV, where upon birth the condition was obvious, either due to bowing of the limbs or due to fractures sustained in utero. Tarda was used to classify the modern OI type I and some cases of type IV, where the inherent fragility of the bones did not become clear until long after birth. The idea that these "late" and "prenatal" forms were manifestations of the same disorder was first proposed in 1897 by Martin Benno Schmidt; by the 1950s this fact was well accepted.

The modern system of four types (I, II, III, IV), meanwhile, were introduced in a paper by David Sillence, Alison Senn, and David Danks in the Journal of Medical Genetics in 1979, and have since become standard terms among doctors, patients, and researchers. The modern genetic types, (those with numbers greater than IV,) have come into use as more and more recessively inherited forms of OI have been discovered since the discovery of the first one by Roy Morello et al. in 2006. In 2010, the International Nomenclature Group for Constitutional Disorders of the Skeleton (INCDS) "freed" the Sillence types from molecular reference, acquiescing to their new clinical-first role in the wake of what was to them a "surprising" increase in the number of genetic causes of OI.

Writing for the Annual Review of Genetics in 2012, Drs. Peter Byers and Shawna M. Pyott lamented how the expansion of the number of types to include genetic types has created a system that "grew like Topsy". They suggest that it may indeed be impossible to create a system which is useful for clinicians and which accurately describes the genetic cause of a person's OI, with attempts always prioritizing one use at the expense of the other.

== Society and culture ==
Much medical research has been done into the causes of osteogenesis imperfecta, benefiting not only those with OI but medicine more broadly; in the ten years between 2006 and 2016, the many discoveries of non-collagen related recessive gene mutations, which still led in those who have them to the clinical signs of OI, led to numerous breakthroughs in medical understanding of the process of healthy bone development.

== Other animals ==
In dogs, OI is an autosomal recessive condition, meaning that dogs with two copies of the allele will be affected. Many breed organizations and veterinarians offer OI tests to tell if a dog is a carrier of OI. To prevent OI, dogs who are heterozygous for OI should not be bred.

Naturally occurring mutations causing OI have been found in Golden Retrievers, Dachshunds, and Beagles. OI has also been identified in zebrafish and mice.

Although dogs, mice, fish, and humans are not genetically identical, some of these animal models have been officially recognized to represent the varying types of OI in humans. For example, homozygous oim/oim mice experience spontaneous bone fractures, small body size, and kyphosis, making them a model of OI type III. Meanwhile, heterozygous oim^{/+} mice appear normal but have bones which are quite a bit weaker than wild mice, making them a model for OI type I. As in human OI, the location on the gene which is mutated affects the severity of resulting disease—the G859C Col1a1 mouse is a model for OI type II as affected mice all die in the perinatal period.

Animal testing on identified animal models may lead to human therapies for OI.
