= TENT5C =

Protein-coding gene in humans

Identifiers
- Aliases: TENT5C, family with sequence similarity 46 member C, terminal nucleotidyltransferase 5C, FAM46C
- External IDs: OMIM: 613952; MGI: 1921895; GeneCards: TENT5C
Enzyme activity
EC #	BRENDA	ExPASy	KEGG	MetaCyc
2.7.7.19	↗	↗	↗	↗

Gene location (Human)
Chr.	Chromosome 1 (human)
Band	1p12	Start	117,606,048 bp
Band	1p12	End	117,628,389 bp

Gene location (Mouse)
Chr.	Chromosome 3 (mouse)
Band	3|3 F2.2	Start	100,358,944 bp
Band	3|3 F2.2	End	100,396,640 bp
RNA expression pattern
Bgee	Human / Mouse (ortholog); Top expressed in: secondary oocyte; sperm; trabecular bone; palpebral conjunctiva; epithelium of nasopharynx; bone marrow; pylorus; bronchial epithelial cell; parotid gland; mucosa of sigmoid colon / Top expressed in: blood; tibiofemoral joint; primary oocyte; fetal liver hematopoietic progenitor cell; zygote; secondary oocyte; parotid gland; seminiferous tubule; seminal vesicula; epithelium of lens; More reference expression data
BioGPS	n/a
Gene ontology
Molecular function	protein binding; transferase activity; nucleotidyltransferase activity; polynucleotide adenylyltransferase activity; RNA adenylyltransferase activity; RNA binding
Cellular component	nucleus; cytoplasm
Biological process	mRNA stabilization
Sources:Amigo / QuickGO
Orthologs
Databases	NCBI: entry; OMA: entry
Species	Human	Mouse
Entrez	54855	74645
Ensembl	ENSG00000183508	ENSMUSG00000044468
UniProt	Q5VWP2	Q5SSF7
RefSeq (mRNA)	NM_017709	NM_001142952
RefSeq (protein)	NP_060179	NP_001136424
Location (UCSC)	Chr 1: 117.61 – 117.63 Mb	Chr 3: 100.36 – 100.4 Mb
PubMed search
- Wikidata
View/Edit Human	View/Edit Mouse

Terminal nucleotidyltransferase 5C also known as family with sequence similarity 46, member C (FAM46C) is a protein that, in humans, is encoded by the TENT5C gene at locus 1p12 spanning base pairs from 118,148,556 to 118,171,011.

== Summary ==
FAM46C is a protein of unknown function consisting of 391 amino acid residues that are translated from a messenger ribonucleic acid (mRNA) consisting of 5720 base pairs. FAM46C was initially sequenced as part of the Full-length long Japan genomic sequencing project. FAM46C is found on chromosome 1 at the locus 1p12 FAM46C contains one domain of unknown function, DUF1693, and as such has been placed in the DUF1693 protein family. This family has been established as a part of the Nucleotidyltransferase superfamily and contains 4 nematode prion-like proteins. FAM46C was placed into group XXV of the nucleotidyltransferase superfamily along with 3 other Homo sapiens FAM46 proteins (A, B, D).

It has been suggested that FAM46C may be functionally involved with the type I interferon response. Deletion and/ or mutation of FAM46C has been associated with impaired overall survival in myeloma patients.

== Gene ==
Homo sapiens FAM46C spans 22,456 bases on chromosome 1. Microarray data suggests that human FAM46C displays elevated expression levels in bone marrow, CD71+ early erythroid, various B cells, T cells, lymphocytes, and all tissues associated with testicles.

== Evolution and homology ==
Homo sapiens FAM46C is highly conserved in close orthologs with only small changes in protein AA sequence when comparing to other mammals.

FAM46C and specifically the DUF1693 is traceable throughout the known metazoans, with a distant homolog found in Trichoplax adhaerens, a member of the basal multicellular organismal group Placozoa.

=== Paralogs ===
Homo sapiens FAM46C is paralogous to 3 separate known FAM46 proteins, all of which contain DUF1693.

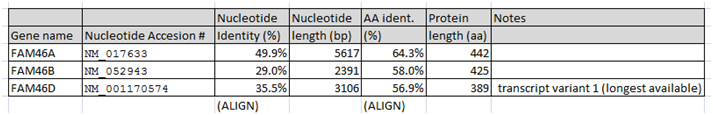
This table lists human FAM46C paralogs, indicating relevant NCBI accession numbers (current as of May 2013), and nucleotide and protein alignment scores calculated using the ALIGN algorithm and cross-checked with NCBI BLAST search.

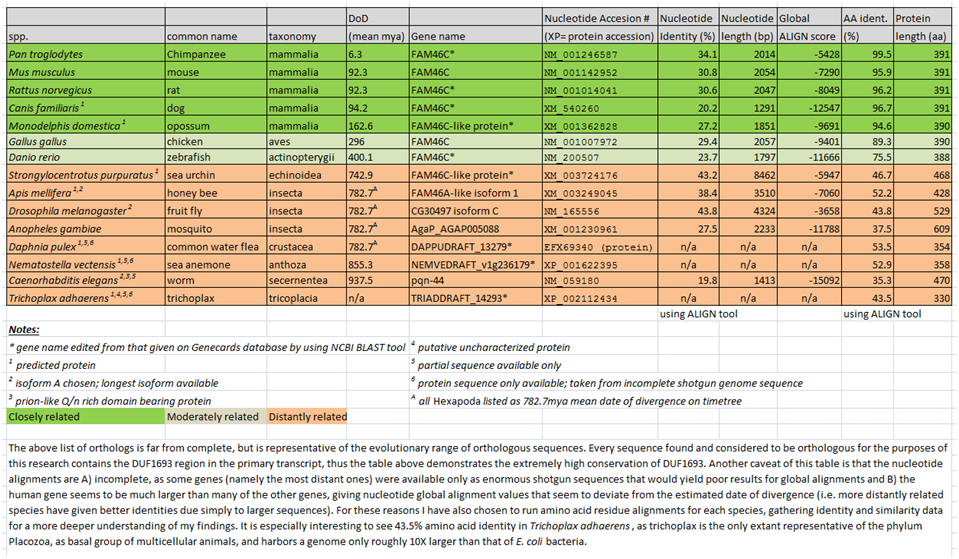
Orthologs of FAM46C are listed in order of date of divergence from the human lineage, as determined by a search of the publicly available Timetree database. All values are considered approximate and are used solely as bioinformatic data compiled via free public databases of published research.

=== Orthologs ===
There are numerous FAM46C orthologs present throughout the current catalog of multicellular organisms, all of which exhibit impressive conservation of domain of unknown function 1693. The most notable ortholog is taken to be TRIADDRAFT14293, a gene of the species Trichoplax adhaerens. This ortholog provides evidence that FAM46C is a member of a group of proteins containing highly conserved amino acid residues, and as such it is thought to provide some highly important function, as would be expected when considering its possible nucleotidyltransferase activity.

=== Homologous domains ===
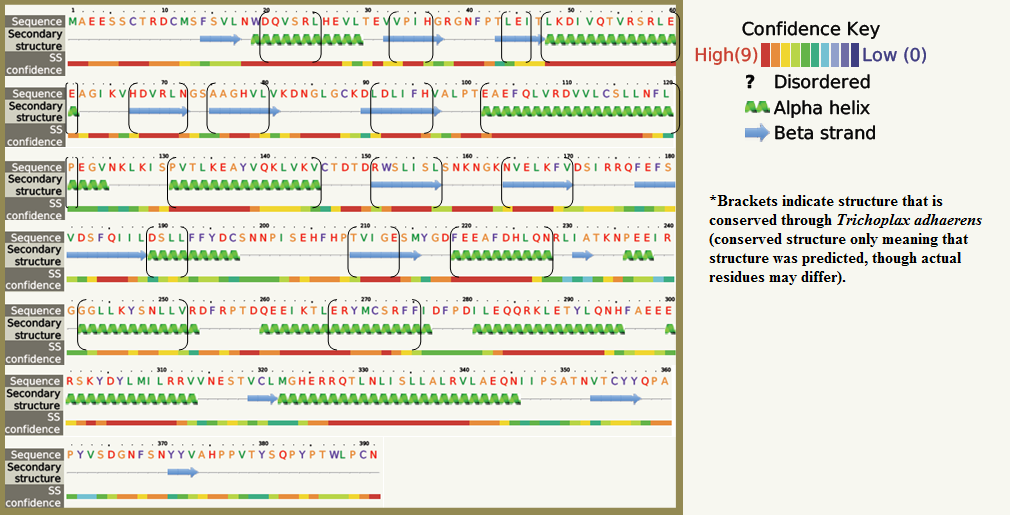
This Phyre2 FAM46C structure prediction was annotated with brackets to demonstrate regions of conserved structure prediction through the Trichoplax ortholog. Many of the structures seem to have originated as shorter segments of what exists in human FAM46C 9 if we are to take high confidence predictions as most probable structures).

To determine possible conserved structures, a predictive approach was used regarding comparing FAM46C with the most distant homolog available, that of Trichoplax adhearens. Phyre2 was used to predict protein secondary structure of human FAM46C and trichoplax TRIADDRAFT-14293. We are able to visualize possible structures predicted with high confidence in both the human gene, and the placozoan gene. This preliminary prediction offers some insight into important structures, most probably of catalytic and/or binding function.

=== Phylogeny ===
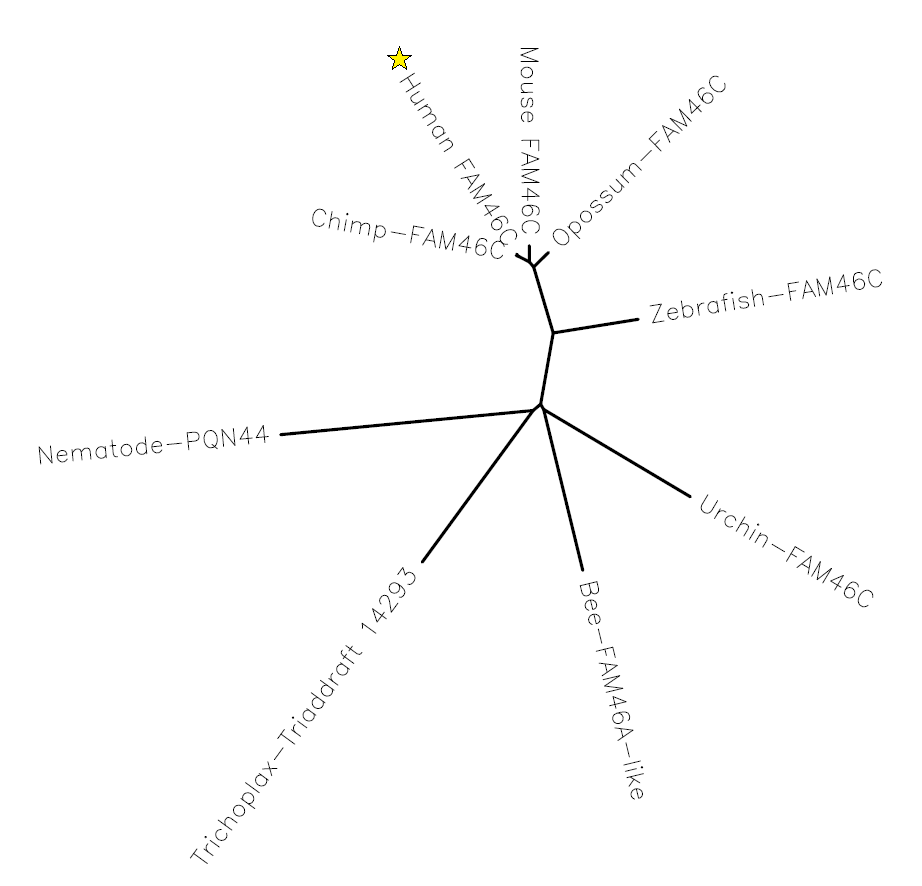
FAM46C Ortholog Unrooted Tree

Based on multiple sequence alignments generated by ClustalW an unrooted phylogenetic tree was generated for select FAM46C orthologs to demonstrate the diverse occurrences of FAM46C-like genes throughout the current evolutionary catalog. For posterity, many orthologs were omitted (see ortholog table above; many were omitted from this table also).

== Protein structure ==
"Homo sapiens" FAM46C encodes a 391 amino acid protein with no known isoforms. "Homo sapiens" FAM46C has not been crystallized and its secondary structure has not yet been determined as of May 2013. FAM46C has a predicted isoelectric point of 5.338. The protein contains one domain of unknown function, DUF1693 (Pfam: PF07984)

A Leucine zipper pattern was found beginning at Lys113 and ending at Lys134. This could help distinguish nuclear proteins from non-nuclear proteins, however all other subsets of analyses using PSORTII have predicted that FAM46C is strictly a cytosolic protein.

No other significant protein structural motifs have been predicted.

=== Protein-protein interactions ===
FAM46C has been experimentally shown to interact physically with at least 4 separate proteins, with other interactions that have been predicted

Protein	Evidence	Accession	Database
DAZAP2	2-hybrid	AAR11454	MINT
TRIP6	2-hybrid	CAA05080	MINT
PLK4	2-hybrid	NM_014264	MINT
AP2B1	2-hybrid	NM_001030006	MINT
