= MESD =

MESD may refer to:

- Marvell–Elaine School District
- Mesoderm development LRP chaperone, a protein encoded by the gene MESD
- Moriarty-Edgewood School District
- Multnomah Education Service District
