= Interferon-induced transmembrane protein 5 =

Protein-coding gene in the species Homo sapiens

IFITM5

Identifiers
- Aliases: IFITM5, interferon induced transmembrane protein 5, BRIL, DSPA1, Hrmp1, OI5, fragilis4
- External IDs: OMIM: 614757; MGI: 1934923; GeneCards: IFITM5

Gene location (Human)
Chr.	Chromosome 11 (human)
Band	11p15.5	Start	298,200 bp
Band	11p15.5	End	299,526 bp

Gene location (Mouse)
Chr.	Chromosome 7 (mouse)
Band	7|7 F5	Start	140,528,871 bp
Band	7|7 F5	End	140,530,204 bp
RNA expression pattern
Bgee	Human / Mouse (ortholog); Top expressed in: body of pancreas; granulocyte; blood; gonad; bone marrow; gastric mucosa; right lung; right coronary artery; upper lobe of left lung; olfactory zone of nasal mucosa / Top expressed in: calvaria; body of femur; molar; fossa; ankle; granulocyte; embryo; embryo; condyle; morula; More reference expression data
BioGPS	n/a
Orthologs
Databases	NCBI: entry; OMA: entry
Species	Human	Mouse
Entrez	387733	73835
Ensembl	ENSG00000206013	ENSMUSG00000025489
UniProt	A6NNB3	O88728
RefSeq (mRNA)	NM_001025295	NM_053088
RefSeq (protein)	NP_001020466	NP_444318
Location (UCSC)	Chr 11: 0.3 – 0.3 Mb	Chr 7: 140.53 – 140.53 Mb
PubMed search
- Wikidata
View/Edit Human	View/Edit Mouse

Interferon-induced transmembrane protein 5 is a gene that encodes a membrane protein thought to play a role in bone mineralization.

== Genomics ==
The gene is located on the short arm of the Crick strand of chromosome 11 (11p15.5). It is located with a cluster of interferon inducible genes but is itself not interferon inducible. The gene is 1,327 bases in length and encodes a protein of 132 amino acids with a predicted molecular weight of 14378 daltons. Expression in adults is bone specific and highest in osteoblasts.

The homolog in the mouse is located on chromosome 7. A homolog is also known to be present in lizards.

== Evolution ==
The gene first appeared in bony fish and its bone specific expression appears to be limited to therian mammals.

== Biochemistry ==
The protein has two transmembrane domains. It associates with FK506 binding protein 11.

== Clinical ==
Mutations in the gene are associated with osteogenesis imperfecta type 5.
