= Theresia Haidlmayr =

Austrian politician (1955–2022)

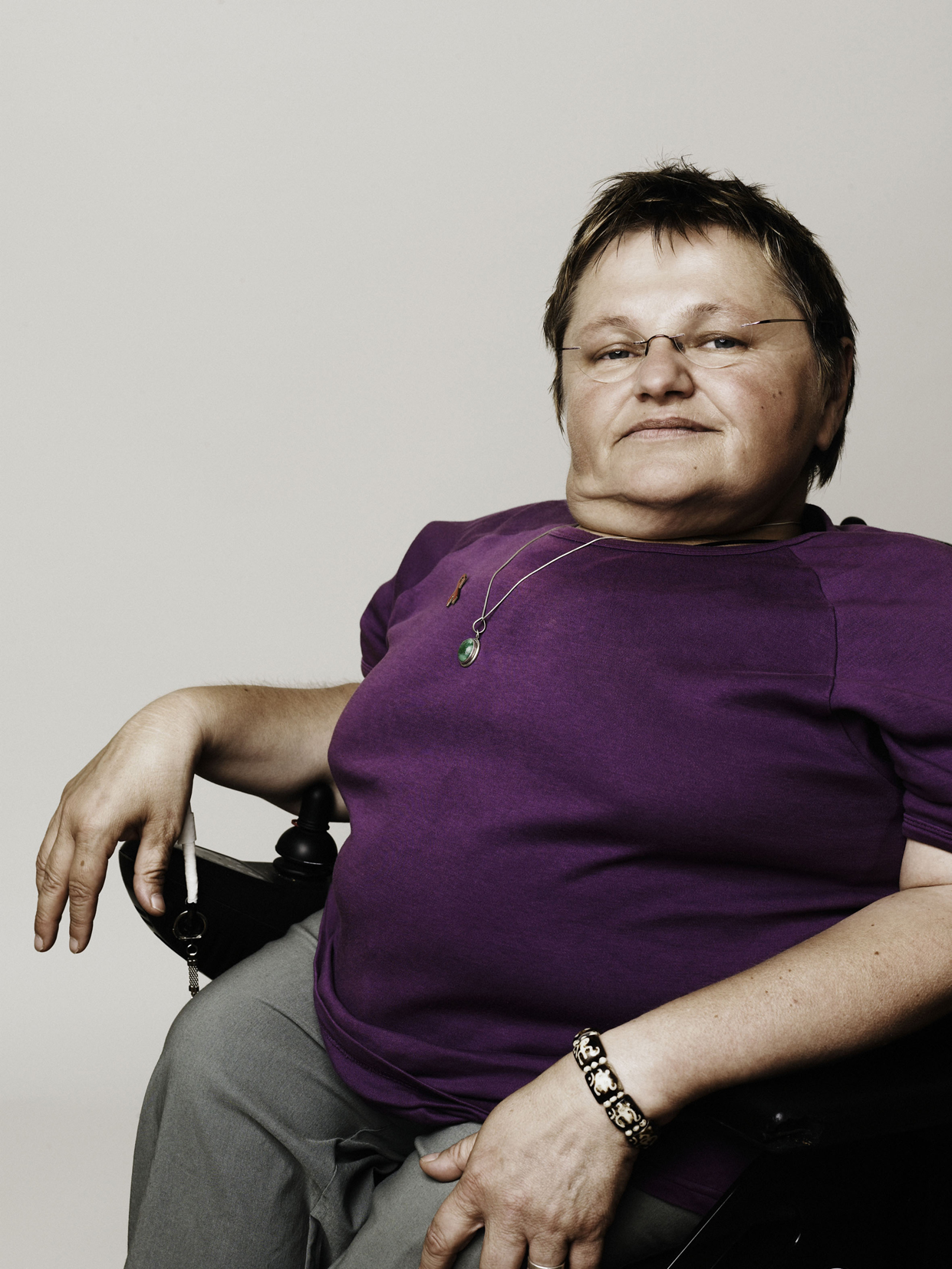
- Haidlmayr in 2006

Personal details
- Born: 9 September 1955 Steyr, Upper Austria, Austria
- Died: 13 June 2022 (aged 66) Vienna, Austria
- Party: The Greens

Theresia Haidlmayr (Note: German pronunciation: [teˈʁeːzia ˈhaɪdəlˌmaɪɐ̯].) (9 September 1955 – 13 June 2022) was an Austrian politician. She was spokesperson for The Greens until 2008.

== Life ==
Haidlmayr was born in Steyr in 1955. She rose to prominence as the spokesperson of the Green Party in Austria from 1994 to 2008, serving in the National Council. However, in the next election in 2008, she decided not to be a candidate due to her dissatisfaction with the low priority her party placed on issues concerning disabled people. Haidlmayr had osteogenesis imperfecta, a condition that caused her to use a wheelchair. The decision to not seek re-election was made by Haidlmayr herself.

== Honours ==
Haidlmayr was awarded the Grand Decoration of Honour in Silver for Services to the Republic of Austria in 2004.
