= Peter Radtke =

German actor and playwright (1943–2020)

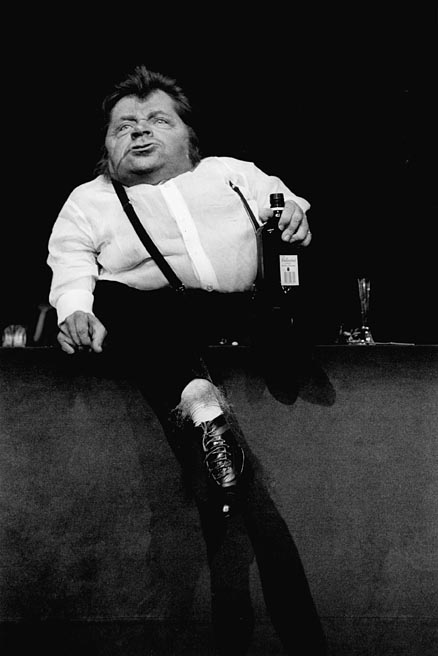
- Radtke in George Tabori's production of Franz Kafka's A Report to an Academy, Prague, 1998
- Born: March 19, 1943; Freiburg im Breisgau, Nazi Germany
- Died: November 28, 2020 (aged 77); Munich, Federal Republic of Germany
- Education: University of Pennsylvania; University of Regensburg; University of Geneva
- Occupations: Actor; Author; Playwright
- Known for: Co-founder of the Münchner Crüppel Cabaret
- Parents: Ernst (father); Käthe (mother)

Doctor Peter Radtke (19 March 1943 – 28 November 2020) was a German actor and playwright who was the author of many scientific publications on disability issues and had a PhD in Romance languages. As a small boy his parents and a sympathetic doctor allowed him to escape a Nazi euthanasia program. From 1957 to 1961 Peter Radtke completed training as an interpreter of English, French and Spanish at a private foreign language school in Regensburg. In 1963 he studied at the University of Pennsylvania and acquired a "Certificate into American Culture and Civilization." Afterwards he studied at Regensburg and Geneva. He would then go on to write an autobiography and appear in three films starting in 1995 with My Mother's Courage. He did drama and theater work before that. In 2003 he was appointed as a member of the national ethics advisory committee by resolution of the Federal Cabinet. Dr. Radtke received a service medal from Bavaria on 17 July 2003. He had osteogenesis imperfecta.
