= Jean Lobstein =

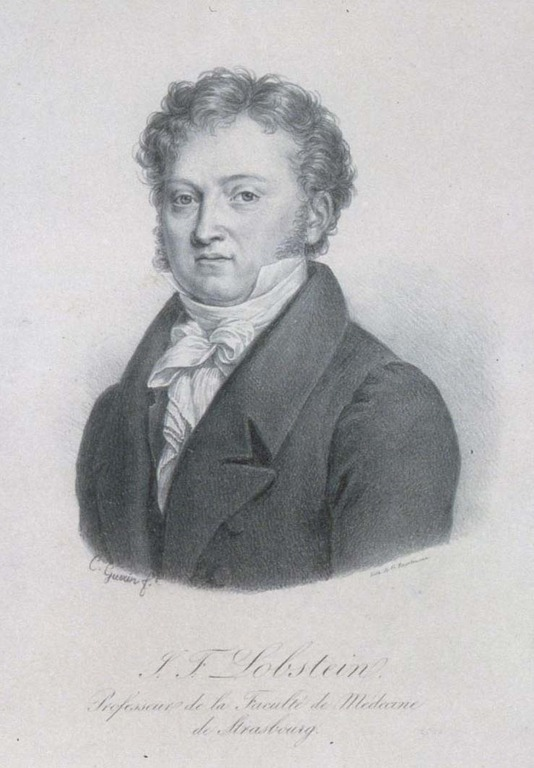
Jean Lobstein (1777-1835)

Jean Georges Chrétien Frédéric Martin Lobstein (German spelling: Johann Friedrich Georg Christian Martin Lobstein) (8 May 1777 – 7 March 1835) was a German-born, French pathologist and surgeon who was a native of Giessen. He was the nephew of noted surgeon Johann Friedrich Lobstein (1736-1784).

In 1803 he earned his doctorate at the University of Strasbourg, subsequently working as an anatomical prosector as well as an assistant to the médecin-accoucheur en chef at the Civil Hospital (Strasbourg). In 1805 he became a professor at École d'obstétrique du Rhin inférieur (School of Obstetrics of the Lower Rhine), where he ultimately served for thirty years. In 1819 he attained a professorship in pathological anatomy.

Jean Lobstein is remembered for contributions made in the field of pathological anatomy. He coined the term 'osteoporosis.' He also described a disorder known today as osteogenesis imperfecta type I, which is sometimes called "Lobstein's disease". This disease is an hereditary, generalized connective tissue disorder characterized by bone fragility and a blue-gray sclerae of the eyes. In 1813 he founded an impressive pathological museum in Strasbourg, a collection that remained intact until the years following the Franco-Prussian War, when its artifacts were either dispersed or lost.

Lobstein's best written effort was an unfinished four-volume work titled "Traité d’anatomie pathologique", being based on his personal experiences as a pathologist. In its second volume he coined the word "arteriosclerosis" in a section on arterial disease. In addition to his work in medicine, he was an avid archaeologist, historian and numismatist.

== Associated eponym ==
- Lobstein's ganglion: Also known as the thoracic splanchnic ganglion; a small collection of nerve bodies on the greater thoracic splanchnic nerve.
