= Willem Vrolik =

Dutch anatomist (1801–1863)

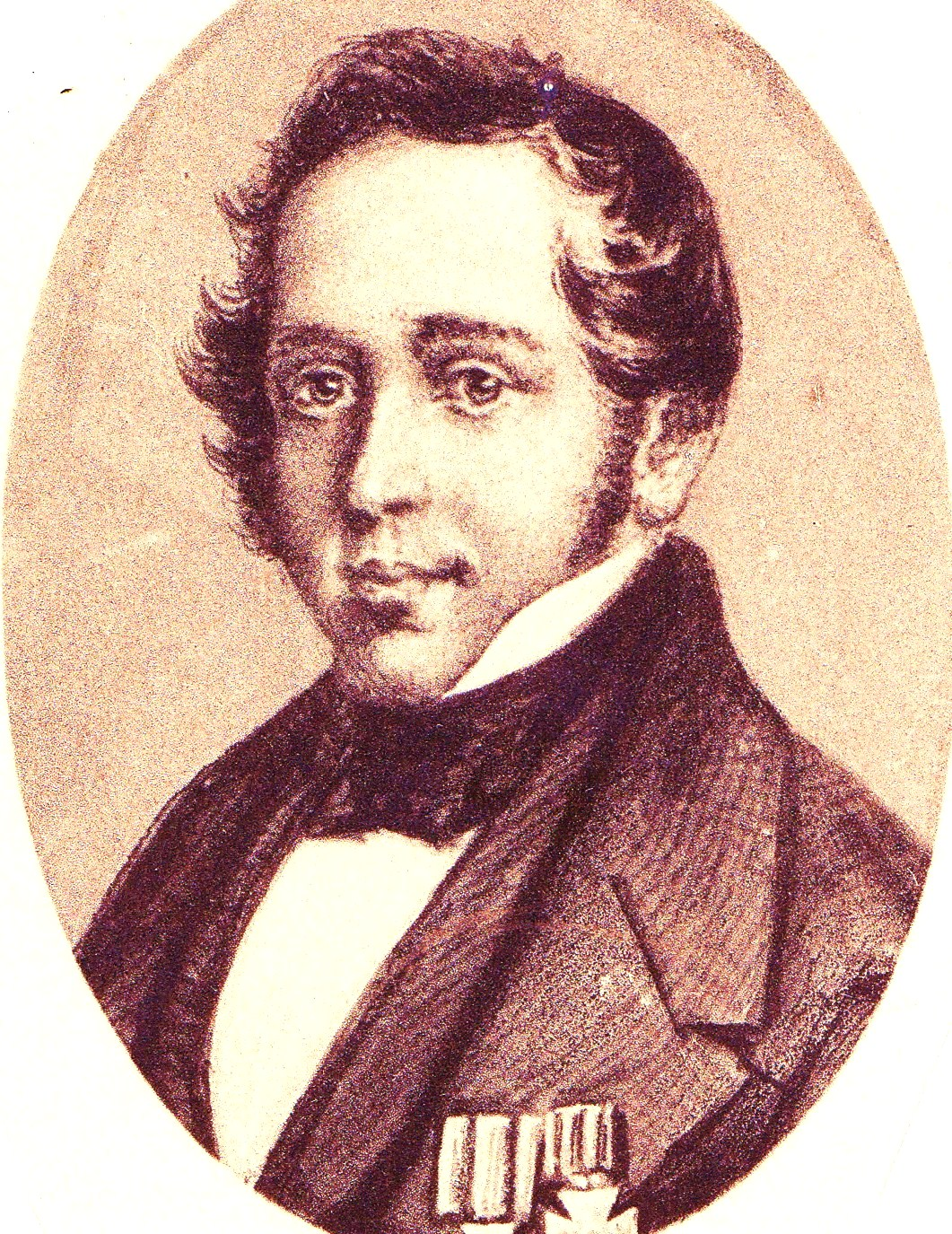
Willem Vrolik (1801–1863)

Willem Vrolik (29 April 1801 – 22 December 1863) was a Dutch anatomist and pathologist who was a native of Amsterdam. He was a pioneer in the field of vertebrate teratology.

He studied medicine at the University of Utrecht, and furthered his studies in Paris, where he received his degree in 1823. In 1829, he became a professor of anatomy and physiology at the University of Groningen, and in 1831 a professor of anatomy, physiology, and natural sciences at the Athenaeum Illustre (University of Amsterdam), where he remained for the rest of his career.

Vrolik made contributions in the fields of comparative anatomy and comparative zoology, and also did important research of skeletal disorders such as osteogenesis imperfecta.

Along with specimens collected by his father, anatomist Gerardus Vrolik (1775–1859), he had amassed an anatomical collection during his career. After Willem's death, donations from various sources have added significantly to the collection. The "Museum Vrolikianum" ). consists of various human and zoological body parts, fetuses, and plaster casts that exhibit different aspects of embryology, pathology and anatomy. The museum also contains numerous examples of congenital malformations.

Willem Vrolik published teratological works on cyclopia, the pathogenesis of congenital anomalies, and a treatise on conjoined twins. In the 1840s, he published Handboek der ziektekundige ontleedkunde (Handbook of pathological anatomy), as well as Tabulae ad illustrandam embryogenesin hominis et mammalium tam naturalem quam abnormem. The latter book contained numerous illustrative plates on the embryogenesis of vertebrates, including congenital anomalies of various species, including man. In 1850, the book won the Prix Montyon from the French Academy of Sciences. He was also the author of highly regarded treatises on the chimpanzee (1841), Hyperoodon (1847), and Manatus americanus (1852).

Vrolik became a correspondent of the Royal Institute in 1829, and a member in 1832. When the Royal Institute became the Royal Netherlands Academy of Arts and Sciences in 1851 Vrolik became a member.

== Bibliography ==
- Natuur- en ontleedkundige opmerkingen over den chameleon, Vrolik, Willem, Amsterdam, Meyer, 1827.
- Natuur en ontleedkundige beschouwing van den hyperoodon, Vrolik, Willem, Haarlem, Loosjes, 1848.
- Bijdragen tot de natuurkundige wetenschappen, Van Hall, Herman Christiaan -- Vrolik, Willem 1801-1863 -- Mulder, Gerardus Johannes, 1802-1880, Amsterdam, J. van der Hey en zoon etc., 1826-32, 7 v. : plates, tables.; 22 cm.
- Vrolik Museum Web Page; Biography of Willem Vrolik
