= Wormian bone-multiple fractures-dentinogenesis imperfecta-skeletal dysplasia syndrome =

- Other names: Suarez-Stickler syndrome
- Wavy defects of the tibial cortex and a lesion of the fibular cortex in a 4-and-a-half year old patient with Wormian bone-multiple fractures-dentinogenesis imperfecta-skeletal dysplasia syndrome
- Specialty: Medical genetics
- Symptoms: Bone abnormalities
- Usual onset: Birth
- Duration: Lifelong
- Causes: Genetic mutation
- Frequency: 0.0001%

Wormian bone-multiple fractures-dentinogenesis imperfecta-skeletal dysplasia syndrome is a rare genetic bone disorder which is characterized by the presence of wormian bones in the skull, dentinogenesis imperfecta, recurrent bone fractures, hypertelorism, and eye puffiness. This disorder is unique from osteogenesis imperfecta because of the presence of cortical defects and the absence of defective collagen or osteopenia. It is not exactly known whether this condition is autosomal dominant or autosomal recessive.

It has been described in 2 non-consanguineous families.
