= FKBP10 =

Protein-coding gene in the species Homo sapiens

Identifiers
- Aliases: FKBP10, FKBP65, OI11, OI6, PPIASE, hFKBP65, BRKS1, FK506 binding protein 10, FKBP prolyl isomerase 10
- External IDs: OMIM: 607063; MGI: 104769; GeneCards: FKBP10
Enzyme activity
EC #	BRENDA	ExPASy	KEGG	MetaCyc
5.2.1.8	↗	↗	↗	↗

Gene location (Human)
Chr.	Chromosome 17 (human)
Band	17q21.2	Start	41,812,680 bp
Band	17q21.2	End	41,823,213 bp

Gene location (Mouse)
Chr.	Chromosome 11 (mouse)
Band	11 D|11 63.47 cM	Start	100,306,523 bp
Band	11 D|11 63.47 cM	End	100,315,650 bp
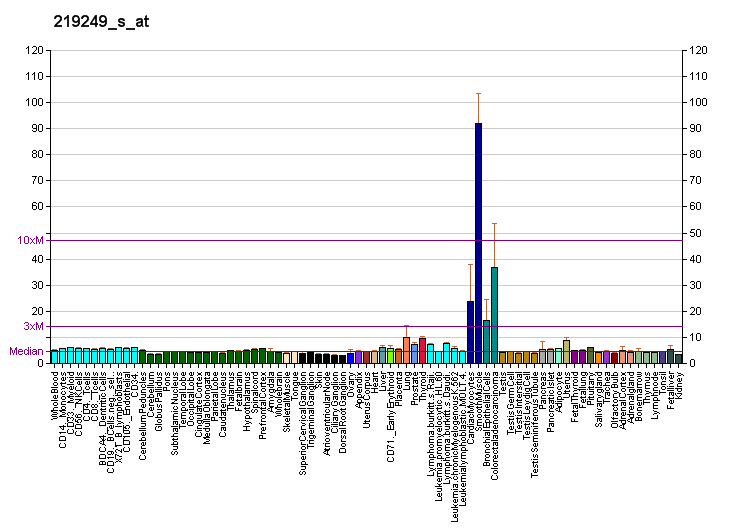
RNA expression pattern
Bgee	Human / Mouse (ortholog); Top expressed in: stromal cell of endometrium; ascending aorta; Descending thoracic aorta; anterior pituitary; right coronary artery; right ovary; canal of the cervix; body of uterus; left ovary; left coronary artery / Top expressed in: calvaria; internal carotid artery; external carotid artery; body of femur; fossa; molar; vas deferens; vestibular sensory epithelium; stroma of bone marrow; dermis; More reference expression data
BioGPS	More reference expression data
Gene ontology
Molecular function	calcium ion binding; isomerase activity; peptidyl-prolyl cis-trans isomerase activity; metal ion binding; FK506 binding
Cellular component	endoplasmic reticulum lumen; endoplasmic reticulum; cytoplasm; nucleolus
Biological process	chaperone-mediated protein folding; histone peptidyl-prolyl isomerization; peptidyl-proline modification; protein peptidyl-prolyl isomerization
Sources:Amigo / QuickGO
Orthologs
Databases	NCBI: entry; OMA: entry
Species	Human	Mouse
Entrez	60681	14230
Ensembl	ENSG00000141756	ENSMUSG00000001555
UniProt	Q96AY3	Q61576
RefSeq (mRNA)	NM_021939	NM_001163481; NM_010221
RefSeq (protein)	NP_068758	NP_001156953; NP_034351
Location (UCSC)	Chr 17: 41.81 – 41.82 Mb	Chr 11: 100.31 – 100.32 Mb
PubMed search
- Wikidata
View/Edit Human	View/Edit Mouse

FK506-binding protein 10 is a protein that in humans is encoded by the FKBP10 gene.

The protein encoded by this gene belongs to the FKBP-type peptidyl-prolyl cis/trans isomerase family. It is located in endoplasmic reticulum and acts as molecular chaperones. Two alternatively spliced variants, which encode different isoform, are reported.
