= Basilar invagination =

Infolding of the base of the skull from upward movement of the C2 vertebra

- Specialty: Neurology

Basilar invagination is invagination (infolding) of the base of the skull that occurs when the top of the C2 vertebra migrates upward. It can cause narrowing of the foramen magnum (the opening in the skull where the spinal cord passes through to the brain). It also may press on the lower brainstem.

This is similar to Chiari malformation. That, however, is usually present at birth.

== Diagnosis ==
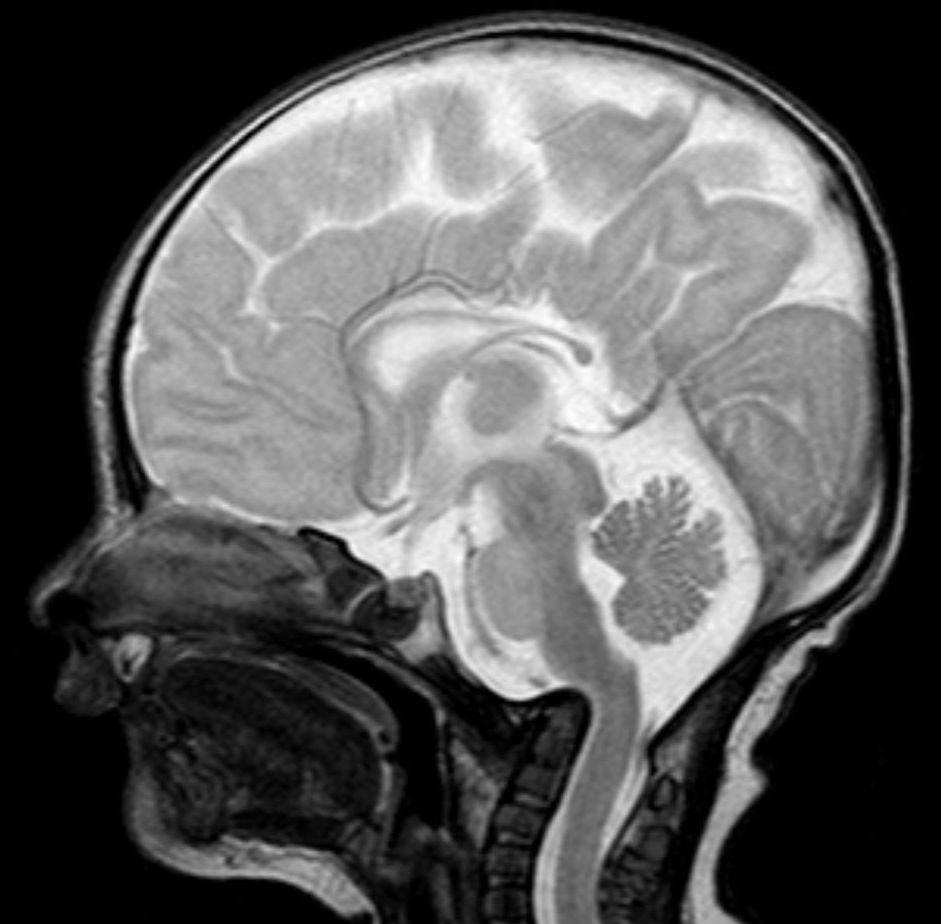
Basilar invagination in an infant with Wolf–Hirschhorn syndrome.

A doctor will base his or her diagnosis on the symptoms the patient has and the results of tests, including:

- An X-ray
- Magnetic resonance imaging (MRI), which usually provides the most information
- Computed tomography (CT) scan

== See also ==
- Chiari malformation
- Hydrocephalus
