= Terminal nucleotidyltransferase 5A =

Enzyme found in humans

TENT5A

Identifiers
- Aliases: TENT5A, C6orf37, XTP11, family with sequence similarity 46 member A, terminal nucleotidyltransferase 5A, FAM46A, OI18
- External IDs: OMIM: 611357; MGI: 2670964; GeneCards: TENT5A
Enzyme activity
| EC # | BRENDA | ExPASy | KEGG | MetaCyc |
|---|---|---|---|---|
| 2.7.7.19 | ↗ | ↗ | ↗ | ↗ |

Gene location (Human)
| Chr. | Chromosome 6 (human) |
| Band | 6q14.1 | Start | 81,491,439 bp |
| Band | 6q14.1 | End | 81,752,774 bp |

Gene location (Mouse)
| Chr. | Chromosome 9 (mouse) |
| Band | 9|9 E3.1 | Start | 85,202,492 bp |
| Band | 9|9 E3.1 | End | 85,209,401 bp |
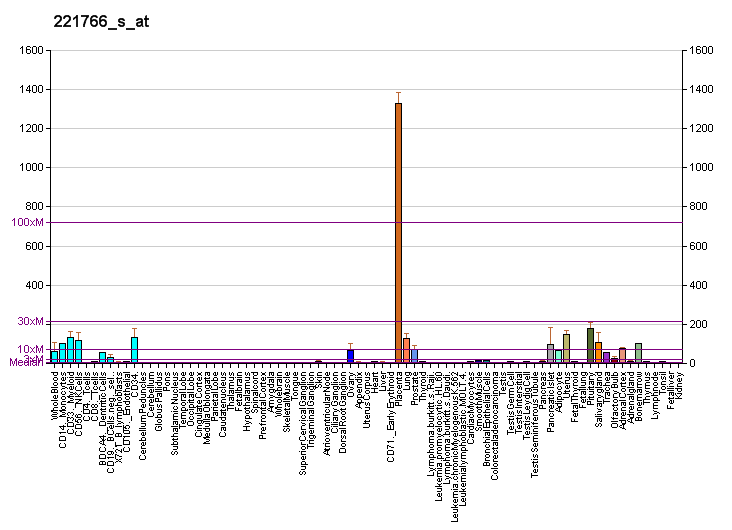
RNA expression pattern
| Bgee | Human / Mouse (ortholog); Top expressed in: parotid gland; tibia; pericardium; trachea; nipple; trabecular bone; right ventricle; skin of hip; vena cava; cartilage tissue / Top expressed in: molar; body of femur; otolith organ; calvaria; utricle; conjunctival fornix; left colon; umbilical cord; ciliary body; salivary gland; More reference expression data |
| BioGPS | More reference expression data |
Orthologs
| Databases | NCBI: entry; OMA: entry |
| Species | Human | Mouse |
| Entrez | 55603 | 212943 |
| Ensembl | ENSG00000112773 | ENSMUSG00000032265 |
| UniProt | Q96IP4 | D3Z5S8 |
| RefSeq (mRNA) | NM_017633 | NM_001160378; NM_001160379 |
| RefSeq (protein) | NP_060103 | NP_001153850; NP_001153851 |
| Location (UCSC) | Chr 6: 81.49 – 81.75 Mb | Chr 9: 85.2 – 85.21 Mb |
| PubMed search |
- Wikidata
| View/Edit Human | View/Edit Mouse |

Terminal nucleotidyltransferase 5A is an enzyme that in humans is encoded by the TENT5A gene (previously FAM46A). Other aliases for TENT5A include HBV X-Transactivated Gene 11 Protein, C6orf37, and XTP11. The gene contains 6 introns, and is 6982 base pairs long. The transcribed mRNA is 2231 base pairs long and contains 2 exons, 589 and 1128 base pairs, with 4 alternative splice isoforms.

== Expression ==
Expression of Fam46A is found to be exceptionally high in Placental tissue, Pineal Gland, and Pituitary Gland with low to moderate expression within Bone Marrow, Uterus, and Salivary glands.

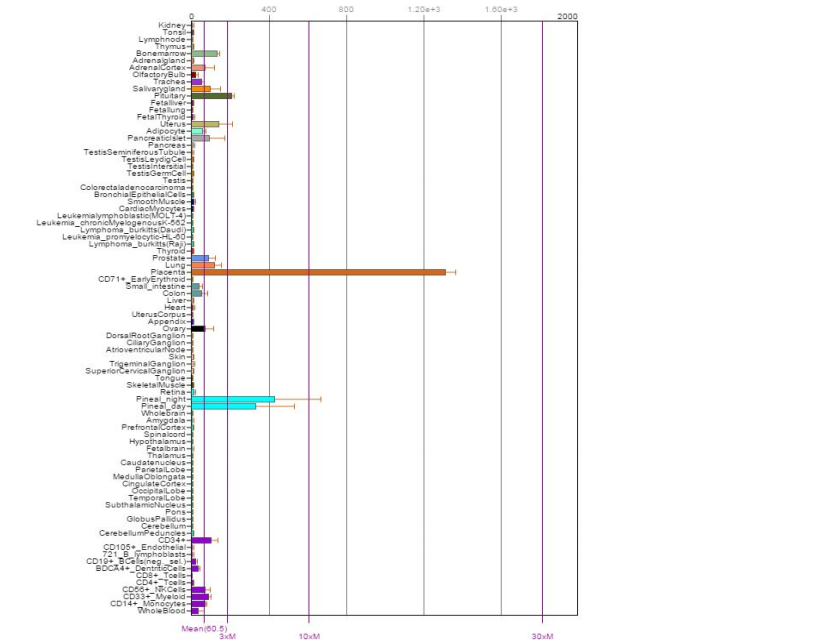

== Protein ==
The human FAM46A protein is 461 Amino Acids long.

== Function ==
The function of Fam46A is currently unknown but there is a Variable Number Tandem Repeat in the first exon of Fam46A that has been explored within various populations and have been attempted to be linked to various retinal diseases as well as colon cancer.
