= Mesoderm development LRP chaperone =

Protein-coding gene in the species Homo sapiens

MESD
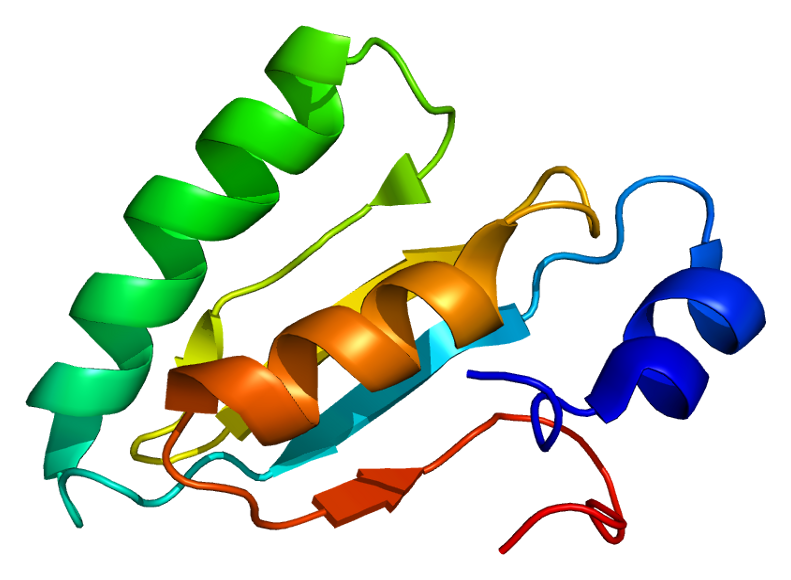
Available structures
PDB	Ortholog search: PDBe RCSB
PDB	List of PDB id codes 2I9S, 2KGL, 2KMI, 2RQK, 2RQM, 3OFH

Identifiers
- Aliases: MESD, BOCA, MESDC2, mesoderm development candidate 2, mesoderm development LRP chaperone, OI20
- External IDs: OMIM: 607783; MGI: 1891421; HomoloGene: 11347; GeneCards: MESD; OMA:MESD - orthologs

Gene location (Human)
Chr.	Chromosome 15 (human)
Band	15q25.1	Start	80,946,289 bp
Band	15q25.1	End	80,989,828 bp

Gene location (Mouse)
Chr.	Chromosome 7 (mouse)
Band	7 48.35 cM|7 D3	Start	83,884,466 bp
Band	7 48.35 cM|7 D3	End	83,901,532 bp
RNA expression pattern
Bgee	Human / Mouse (ortholog); Top expressed in: pancreatic epithelial cell; pancreatic ductal cell; corpus epididymis; mucosa of ileum; nasal epithelium; tibia; palpebral conjunctiva; parotid gland; internal globus pallidus; germinal epithelium / Top expressed in: saccule; otic placode; supraoptic nucleus; ureter; otic vesicle; medullary collecting duct; renal corpuscle; vestibular sensory epithelium; primitive streak; spermatocyte; More reference expression data
BioGPS	n/a
Gene ontology
Molecular function	low-density lipoprotein particle receptor binding; identical protein binding; molecular function
Cellular component	plasma membrane; endoplasmic reticulum; cellular component
Biological process	mesoderm development; protein folding; Wnt signaling pathway; phagocytosis; protein localization to cell surface; positive regulation of skeletal muscle acetylcholine-gated channel clustering
Sources:Amigo / QuickGO
Orthologs
Species	Human	Mouse
Entrez	23184	67943
Ensembl	ENSG00000117899	ENSMUSG00000038503
UniProt	Q14696	Q9ERE7
RefSeq (mRNA)	NM_015154	NM_023403
RefSeq (protein)	NP_055969	NP_075892; NP_001361019
Location (UCSC)	Chr 15: 80.95 – 80.99 Mb	Chr 7: 83.88 – 83.9 Mb
PubMed search
- Wikidata
View/Edit Human	View/Edit Mouse

Mesoderm development LRP chaperone, or MESD, is a protein that in humans is encoded by the MESD gene.
