= Cis-trans isomerase =

A cis-trans isomerase is an enzyme that catalyzes the conversion, or isomerization, of a small molecule or moiety between its cis and trans geometric isomers. These enzymes are essential in a variety of biological processes by facilitating the structural rearrangement of molecules. Cis-trans isomerases are a type of isomerase.

== Biological processes ==
Processes where these enzymes take part are protein folding, fatty acid metabolism, retinoid metabolism, cell cycle regulation and signal transduction.

=== Modification of protein tertiary structure ===
Prolyl isomerases change the conformation of prolyl moieties inside of protein chains. This can improve or even allow folding of certain proteins. Six prolyl isomerases are known in humans that also act as protein folding chaperones: PPIB, PPID, FKBP2, FKBP4, FKBP5 and FKBP11. By regulation of folding, these chaperones act as transducers of signals.

Furthermore, the modification of protein structure also controls the biological activities of already folded proteins and has been implicated in a wide range of diseases, for example the roles of PIN1 in kidney disease.

=== Conversion of small molecules ===
The Retinoid isomerohydrolase RPE65 cleaves and isomerizes all-trans-retinyl fatty acid esters to 11-cis-retinol, part of regeneration of 11-cis-retinal that is essential in visual perception. Sphingolipid delta(4)-desaturase DES1 also has retinol cis-trans isomerase activity.

In Lactobacilli and other bacteria the enzyme linoleate isomerase was found switching cis-trans bonds. This reaction is of interest for the biotechnical synthesis of conjugated linoleic acid (CLA). Another example found in many bacterial strains is maleate cis-trans isomerase, transforming maleate to fumarate.
