= Peptidylprolyl isomerase D =

Protein-coding gene in the species Homo sapiens

PPID
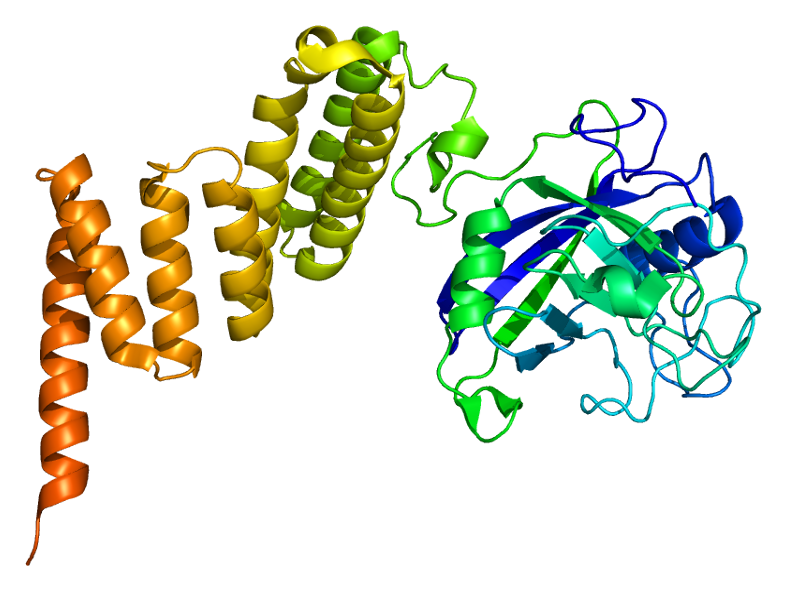

Identifiers
- Aliases: PPID, CYP-40, CYPD, peptidylprolyl isomerase D
- External IDs: OMIM: 601753; MGI: 1914988; GeneCards: PPID
Enzyme activity
| EC # | BRENDA | ExPASy | KEGG | MetaCyc |
|---|---|---|---|---|
| 5.2.1.8 | ↗ | ↗ | ↗ | ↗ |

Gene location (Human)
| Chr. | Chromosome 4 (human) |
| Band | 4q32.1 | Start | 158,709,127 bp |
| Band | 4q32.1 | End | 158,723,396 bp |

Gene location (Mouse)
| Chr. | Chromosome 3 (mouse) |
| Band | 3|3 E3 | Start | 79,498,649 bp |
| Band | 3|3 E3 | End | 79,510,957 bp |
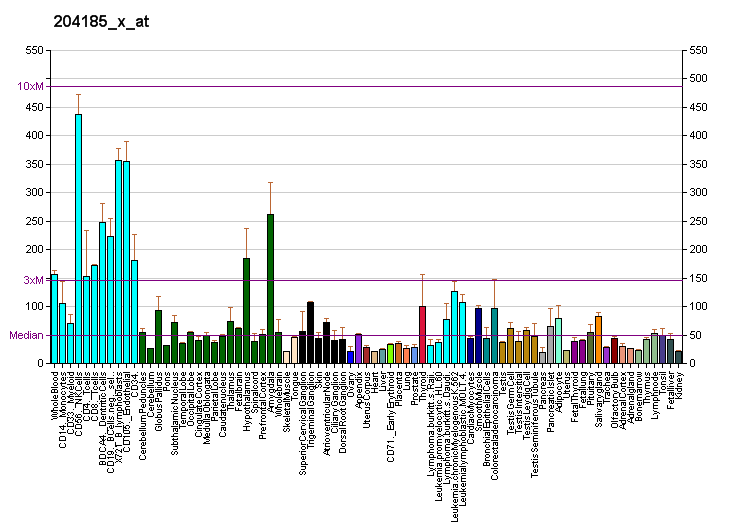

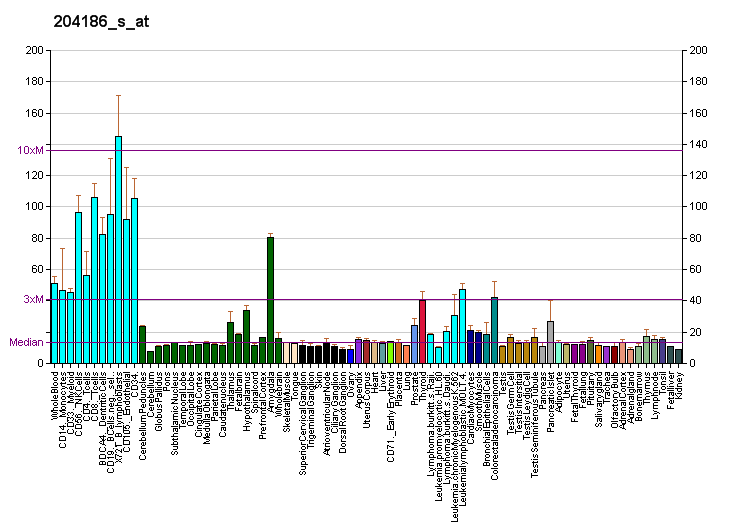
RNA expression pattern
| Bgee | Human / Mouse (ortholog); Top expressed in: right lobe of liver; muscle of thigh; gastrocnemius muscle; mucosa of transverse colon; gonad; Skeletal muscle tissue of rectus abdominis; right adrenal cortex; rectum; body of tongue; left ventricle / Top expressed in: tail of embryo; epiblast; cingulate gyrus; embryo; embryo; genital tubercle; neural tube; ventricular zone; amygdala; otic vesicle; More reference expression data |
| BioGPS | More reference expression data |
Gene ontology
| Molecular function | Hsp90 protein binding; heat shock protein binding; transcription factor binding; isomerase activity; peptidyl-prolyl cis-trans isomerase activity; Hsp70 protein binding; protein binding; estrogen receptor binding; cyclosporin A binding; unfolded protein binding |
| Cellular component | cytoplasm; nucleolus; nucleus; cytosol; nucleoplasm; mitochondrion |
| Biological process | chaperone-mediated protein folding; cellular response to UV-A; viral release from host cell; lipid droplet organization; negative regulation of transcription by RNA polymerase II; protein folding; positive regulation of protein secretion; positive regulation of apoptotic process; protein transport; positive regulation of viral genome replication; apoptotic process; protein-containing complex assembly; protein peptidyl-prolyl isomerization; protein refolding; negative regulation of apoptotic process; regulation of mitochondrial membrane potential |
Sources:Amigo / QuickGO
Orthologs
| Databases | NCBI: entry; OMA: entry |
| Species | Human | Mouse |
| Entrez | 5481 | 67738 |
| Ensembl | ENSG00000171497 | ENSMUSG00000027804 |
| UniProt | Q08752 | Q9CR16 |
| RefSeq (mRNA) | NM_005038 | NM_026352; NM_001356326 |
| RefSeq (protein) | NP_005029 | NP_080628; NP_001343255 |
| Location (UCSC) | Chr 4: 158.71 – 158.72 Mb | Chr 3: 79.5 – 79.51 Mb |
| PubMed search |
- Wikidata
| View/Edit Human | View/Edit Mouse |

Peptidylprolyl isomerase D (cyclophilin D), also known as PPID, is an enzyme which in humans is encoded by the PPID gene on chromosome 4. As a member of the peptidyl-prolyl cis-trans isomerase (PPIase) family, this protein catalyzes the cis-trans isomerization of proline imidic peptide bonds, which allows it to facilitate folding or repair of proteins. In addition, PPID participates in many biological processes, including mitochondrial metabolism, apoptosis, redox, and inflammation, as well as in related diseases and conditions, such as ischemic reperfusion injury, AIDS, and cancer.

== Structure ==
Like other cyclophilins, PPID forms a β-barrel structure with a hydrophobic core. This β-barrel is composed of eight anti-parallel β-strands and capped by two α-helices at the top and bottom. In addition, the β-turns and loops in the strands contribute to the flexibility of the barrel. PPID in particular is composed of 370 residues and shares structural homology with PPIF, FKBP4, and FKBP5, including an N-terminal immunophilin-like domain and a C-terminal tetratricopeptide repeat (TPR) domain.

== Function ==
The protein encoded by this gene is a member of the peptidyl-prolyl cis-trans isomerase (PPIase) family. PPIases catalyze the cis-trans isomerization of proline imidic peptide bonds in oligopeptides and accelerate the folding of proteins. Generally, PPIases are found in all eubacteria and eukaryotes, as well as in a few archaea, and thus are highly conserved. The PPIase family is further divided into three structurally distinct subfamilies: cyclophilin (CyP), FK506-binding protein (FKBP), and parvulin (Pvn). As a cyclophilin, PPID binds cyclosporin A (CsA) and can be found within the cell or secreted by the cell. In eukaryotes, cyclophilins localize ubiquitously to many cell and tissue types. In addition to PPIase and protein chaperone activities, cyclophilins also function in mitochondrial metabolism, apoptosis, immunological response, inflammation, and cell growth and proliferation. PPID in particular helps chaperone the assembly of heat shock protein Hsp90, as well as the nuclear localization of glucocorticoid, estrogen and progesterone receptors. Along with PPIF, PPID regulates mitochondrial apoptosis. In response to elevated reactive oxygen species (ROS) and calcium ion levels, PPID interacts with Bax to promote mitochondrial pore formation, thus releasing pro-apoptotic factors such as cytochrome C and AIF.

== Clinical Significance ==
As a cyclophilin, PPID binds the immunosuppressive drug CsA to form a CsA-cyclophilin complex, which then targets calcineurin to inhibit the signaling pathway for T-cell activation.

In cardiac myogenic cells, cyclophilins have been observed to be activated by heat shock and hypoxia-reoxygenation as well as complex with heat shock proteins. Thus, cyclophilins may function in cardioprotection during ischemia-reperfusion injury.

Currently, cyclophilin expression is highly correlated with cancer pathogenesis, but the specific mechanisms remain to be elucidated. Studies have shown that PPID protects human keratinocytes from UVA-induced apoptosis, so medication and therapies that inhibit PPID, such as CsA, may inadvertently aid skin cancer development. Conversely, treatments promoting PPID activity may improve patient outcomes when paired with UVA therapies against cancer.

== Interactions ==
PPID has been shown to interact with:

- CsA
- Bax
