= PPIF =

Protein-coding gene in the species Homo sapiens

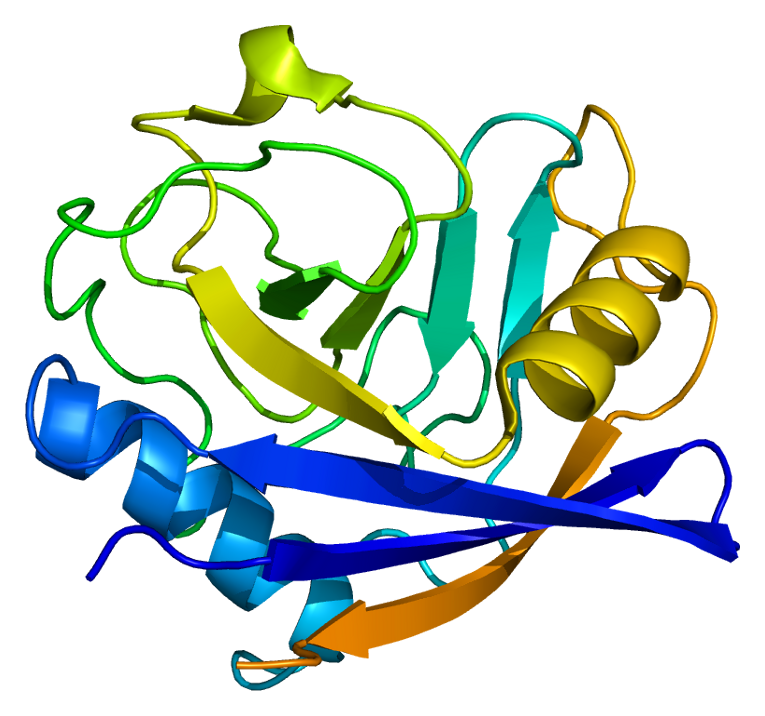

Identifiers
- Aliases: PPIF, CYP3, CyP-M, Cyp-D, CypD, peptidylprolyl isomerase F
- External IDs: OMIM: 604486; MGI: 2145814; GeneCards: PPIF
Available structures
PDB	Ortholog search: PDBe RCSB
PDB	List of PDB id codes 2BIT, 2BIU, 2Z6W, 3QYU, 3R49, 3R4G, 3R54, 3R56, 3R57, 3R59, 3RCF, 3RCG, 3RCI, 3RCK, 3RCL, 3RD9, 3RDA, 3RDB, 3RDC, 4J58, 4J59, 4J5A, 4J5B, 4J5C, 4J5D, 4J5E, 4O8H, 4O8I, 4XNC, 4ZSC, 4ZSD, 5A0E, 5CCS, 5CCN, 5CCQ, 5CBT, 5CCR
Enzyme activity
EC #	BRENDA	ExPASy	KEGG	MetaCyc
5.2.1.8	↗	↗	↗	↗

Gene location (Human)
Chr.	Chromosome 10 (human)
Band	10q22.3	Start	79,347,469 bp
Band	10q22.3	End	79,355,334 bp

Gene location (Mouse)
Chr.	Chromosome 14 (mouse)
Band	14|14 A3	Start	25,694,578 bp
Band	14|14 A3	End	25,700,892 bp
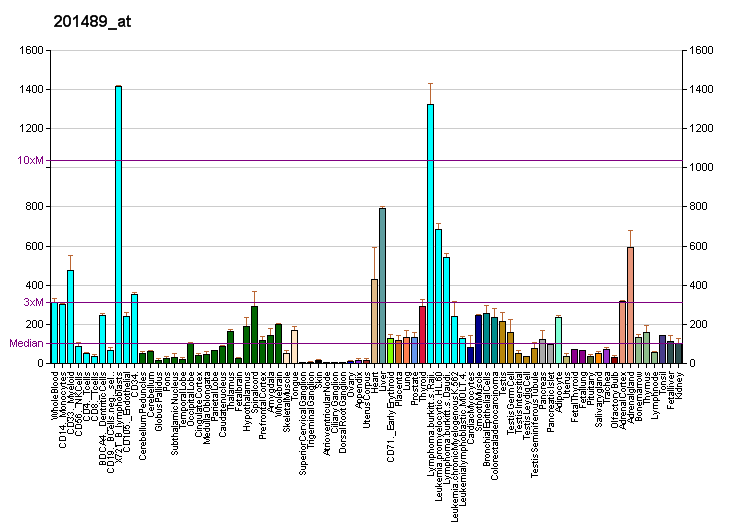

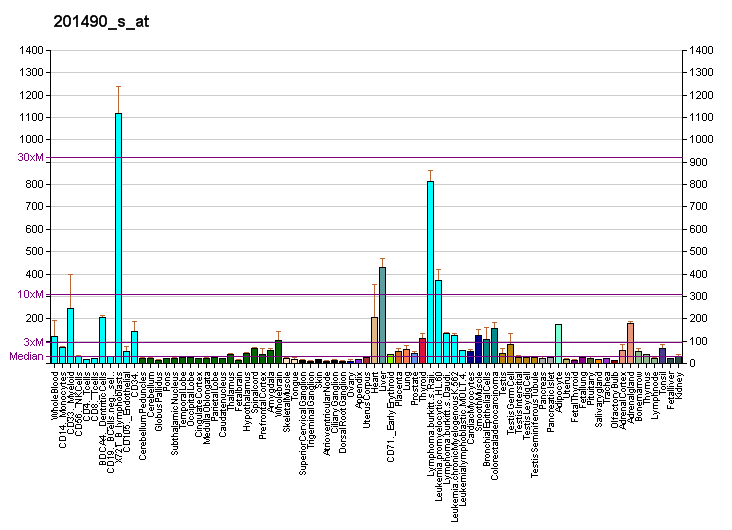
RNA expression pattern
Bgee	Human / Mouse (ortholog); Top expressed in: amniotic fluid; right adrenal cortex; left adrenal gland; left adrenal cortex; periodontal fiber; body of tongue; right lobe of liver; apex of heart; left ventricle; myocardium of left ventricle / Top expressed in: pyloric antrum; interventricular septum; right ventricle; myocardium of ventricle; cardiac muscles; epithelium of stomach; lip; cardiac muscle tissue of left ventricle; mucous cell of stomach; atrium; More reference expression data
BioGPS	More reference expression data
Gene ontology
Molecular function	peptide binding; isomerase activity; protein binding; peptidyl-prolyl cis-trans isomerase activity; cyclosporin A binding; unfolded protein binding
Cellular component	mitochondrial proton-transporting ATP synthase complex; membrane; mitochondrial inner membrane; mitochondrion; mitochondrial matrix; mitochondrial permeability transition pore complex
Biological process	regulation of apoptotic process; cellular response to calcium ion; programmed cell death; negative regulation of intrinsic apoptotic signaling pathway; negative regulation of ATP-dependent activity; negative regulation of release of cytochrome c from mitochondria; negative regulation of apoptotic process; response to oxidative stress; regulation of necrotic cell death; regulation of mitochondrial membrane permeability involved in programmed necrotic cell death; response to ischemia; protein folding; cellular response to arsenic-containing substance; negative regulation of oxidative phosphorylation uncoupler activity; regulation of proton-transporting ATPase activity, rotational mechanism; positive regulation of release of cytochrome c from mitochondria; necroptosis; negative regulation of oxidative phosphorylation; cellular response to hydrogen peroxide; apoptotic process; apoptotic mitochondrial changes; regulation of mitochondrial membrane permeability; mitochondrial outer membrane permeabilization involved in programmed cell death; protein peptidyl-prolyl isomerization; protein refolding
Sources:Amigo / QuickGO
Orthologs
Databases	NCBI: entry; OMA: entry
Species	Human	Mouse
Entrez	10105	105675
Ensembl	ENSG00000108179	ENSMUSG00000021868
UniProt	P30405	Q99KR7
RefSeq (mRNA)	NM_005729	NM_134084
RefSeq (protein)	NP_005720	NP_598845
Location (UCSC)	Chr 10: 79.35 – 79.36 Mb	Chr 14: 25.69 – 25.7 Mb
PubMed search
- Wikidata
View/Edit Human	View/Edit Mouse

Peptidyl-prolyl cis-trans isomerase, mitochondrial (PPIF) is an enzyme that in humans is encoded by the PPIF gene. It has also been referred to as, but should not be confused with, cyclophilin D (CypD), which is encoded by the PPID gene. As a member of the peptidyl-prolyl cis-trans isomerase (PPIase) family, this protein catalyzes the cis-trans isomerization of proline imidic peptide bonds, which allows it to facilitate folding or repair of proteins. PPIF is a major component of the mitochondrial permeability transition pore (MPTP) and, thus, highly involved in mitochondrial metabolism and apoptosis, as well as in mitochondrial diseases and related conditions, including cardiac diseases, neurodegenerative diseases, and muscular dystrophy. In addition, PPIF participates in inflammation, as well as in ischemic reperfusion injury, AIDS, and cancer.

== Structure ==
Like other cyclophilins, PPIF forms a β-barrel structure with a hydrophobic core. This β-barrel is composed of eight anti-parallel β-strands and capped by two α-helices at the top and bottom. In addition, the β-turns and loops in the strands contribute to the flexibility of the barrel. PPIF weighs 17.5 kDa and forms part of the MPTP in the inner mitochondrial membrane (IMM).

== Function ==
The protein encoded by this gene is a member of the peptidyl-prolyl cis-trans isomerase (PPIase) family. PPIases catalyze the cis-trans isomerization of proline imidic peptide bonds in oligopeptides and accelerate the folding of proteins. Generally, PPIases are found in all eubacteria and eukaryotes, as well as in a few archaebacteria, and thus are highly conserved. The PPIase family is further divided into three structurally distinct subfamilies: cyclophilin (CyP), FK506-binding protein (FKBP), and parvulin (Pvn). As a cyclophilin, PPI binds cyclosporin A (CsA) and can be found within the cell or secreted by the cell. In eukaryotes, cyclophilins localize ubiquitously to many cell and tissue types, though studies on PPIF focus primarily on heart, liver, and brain tissue. In addition to PPIase and protein chaperone activities, cyclophilins also function in mitochondrial metabolism, apoptosis, immunological response, inflammation, and cell growth and proliferation. PPIF is especially involved in mitochondrial apoptosis as a major component of the MPTP. Through its PPIase ability, the protein interacts with and induces a conformational change in adenine nucleotide translocase (ANT), the other MPTP component. This activation, along with high calcium ion levels, induces the opening the MPTP, resulting in mitochondrial swelling, increasing reactive oxygen species (ROS) levels, membrane depolarization, failing ATP production, caspase cascade activation, and ultimately, apoptosis.

== Clinical significance ==
As a cyclophilin, PPIF binds the immunosuppressive drug CsA to form a CsA-cyclophilin complex, which then targets calcineurin to inhibit the signaling pathway for T-cell activation.

Due to its association with the MPTP, PPIF is also involved in neurodegenerative diseases, including glaucoma, diabetic retinopathy, Parkinson's disease, and Alzheimer's disease. For neurodegenerative diseases, treatment of reperfusion events with CsA, a PPID inhibitor, prevents cytochrome C release and significantly reduces cell death in neurons. As such, PPID proves to be an effective therapeutic target for patients suffering neurodegenerative diseases.

In addition, PPIF, as part of the MPTP, is involved in ischemia/reperfusion injury, traumatic brain injury (TBI), muscular dystrophy, and drug toxicity. Though PPIF was identified as a candidate for dilated cardiomyopathy (DCM) for one afflicted family, further study revealed no mutations in the gene to implicate it in the disease. Nonetheless, in cardiac myogenic cells, cyclophilins have been observed to be activated by heat shock and hypoxia-reoxygenation as well as complex with heat shock proteins. Thus, cyclophilins may function in cardioprotection during ischemia-reperfusion injury.

Currently, cyclophilin expression is highly correlated with cancer pathogenesis, but the specific mechanisms remain to be elucidated.

== Interactions ==
PPIF has been shown to interact with:

- CsA
- ANT
