= Longitudinal erythronychia =

- Specialty: Dermatology

Longitudinal erythronychia presents with longitudinal red bands in the nail plate that commence in the matrix and extend to the point of separation of the nail plate and nailbed, and may occur on multiple nails with inflammatory conditions such as lichen planus or Darier's disease. Longitudinal erythronychia is usually asymptomatic but can sometimes be associated with pain.

Multiple conditions are associated with longitudinal erythronychia. Longitudinal erythronychia can also be idiopathic. Most conditions that are associated with longitudinal erythronychia cause focal loss of function in the distal matrix.

When multiple nails are affected, it is referred to as polydactylous longitudinal erythronychia (PLE), as opposed to localized longitudinal erythronychia (LLE), which is defined as longitudinal erythronychia confined to a single nail.

Treatment depends on the underlying cause.

== Signs and symptoms ==
Longitudinal erythronychia is a red band or streak on the nail plate. The proximal nail fold is where the longitudinal red stripe clinically originates since it starts within the nail matrix. Following its passage through the lunula, the red band follows the nail bed until it reaches the distal tip of the nail plate, when it breaks away from the nail bed.

In people with longitudinal erythronychia, pain may be the initial symptom to manifest. While some individuals with longitudinal erythronychia experience discomfort in the affected distal digit, the majority of people with this condition do not exhibit any symptoms.

== Causes ==
Localized longitudinal erythronychia may be caused by a wart, onychopapilloma, warty dyskeratoma, increased glomus bodies and additional non-cancerous vascular growths, glomus tumor, Bowen's disease, lichen planus, basal cell carcinoma, and melanoma in situ. Polydactylous longitudinal erythronychia has been most commonly associated with Darier's disease and lichen planus but has also occasionally been associated with acantholytic epidermolysis bullosa, no association, graft-versus-host disease, hemiplegia, and systemic amyloidosis.

== Mechanism ==
A localized loss of function in the distal matrix is a common trait shared by several disorders linked with longitudinal erythronychia. This may happen as a result of matrix disease linked to dermatosis or secondary pressure on the matrix. A ventral groove on the underside of the nail plate and a streak of thinner nail within the longitudinal axis are the results of matrix function loss.

== Diagnosis ==
The evaluation strategy should take into account diagnosing the underlying condition, perhaps treating the longitudinal erythronychia adequately, and trying to reduce the risk of any procedure-related consequences. The clinical history can be useful in explaining symptoms that could point to a glomus tumor. A dermatoscope or magnetic resonance imaging (MRI) examination of the afflicted nail may be beneficial.

=== Classification ===
There are two categories for longitudinal erythronychia based on whether it affects one or more nails. Polydactylous longitudinal erythronychia (PLE) denotes the condition where multiple nails are affected, whereas localized longitudinal erythronychia (LLE) denotes longitudinal erythronychia limited to one nail.

== Treatment ==
The linked etiology determines how longitudinal erythronychia is treated. Resolving the underlying issue may also benefit from a biopsy to determine the disease associated to the linear red band, particularly if it affects just one finger and is caused by a benign condition such an onychopapilloma. In a similar vein, total excision of a subungual glomus tumor may resolve tumor-related symptoms as well as identify the etiology of the accompanying longitudinal erythronychia.

== See also ==
- Nail anatomy
- List of cutaneous conditions
