= FKBP1B =

Protein-coding gene in humans

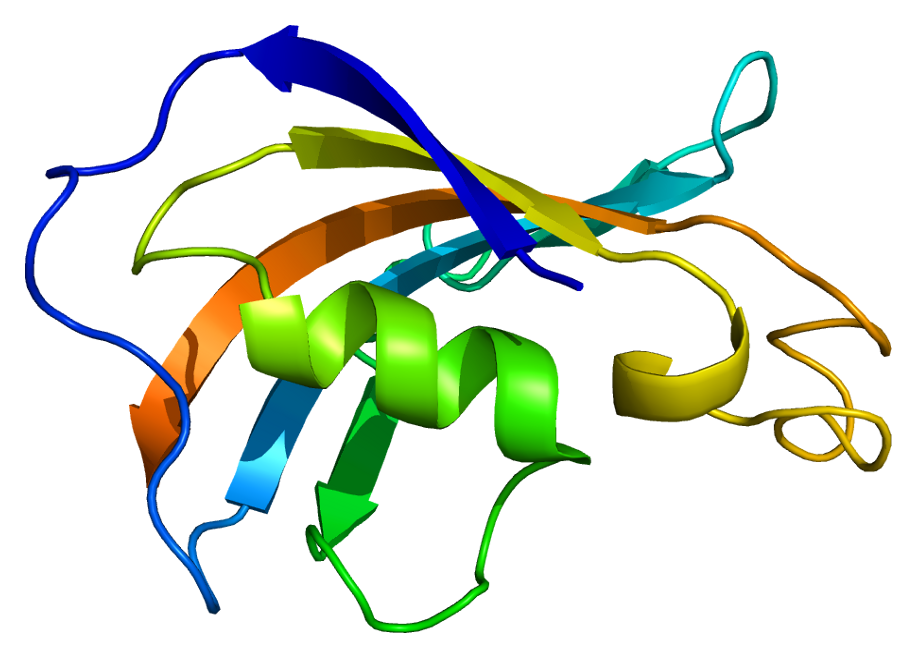

Identifiers
- Aliases: FKBP1B, FKBP12.6, FKBP1L, OTK4, PKBP1L, PPIase, FK506 binding protein 1B, FKBP prolyl isomerase 1B
- External IDs: OMIM: 600620; MGI: 1336205; GeneCards: FKBP1B
Available structures
PDB	Ortholog search: PDBe RCSB
PDB	List of PDB id codes 1C9H, 3J8E, 4C02, 4IQ2, 4IQC
Enzyme activity
EC #	BRENDA	ExPASy	KEGG	MetaCyc
5.2.1.8	↗	↗	↗	↗

Gene location (Human)
Chr.	Chromosome 2 (human)
Band	2p23.3	Start	24,049,701 bp
Band	2p23.3	End	24,063,681 bp

Gene location (Mouse)
Chr.	Chromosome 12 (mouse)
Band	12|12 A1.1	Start	4,883,174 bp
Band	12|12 A1.1	End	4,891,591 bp
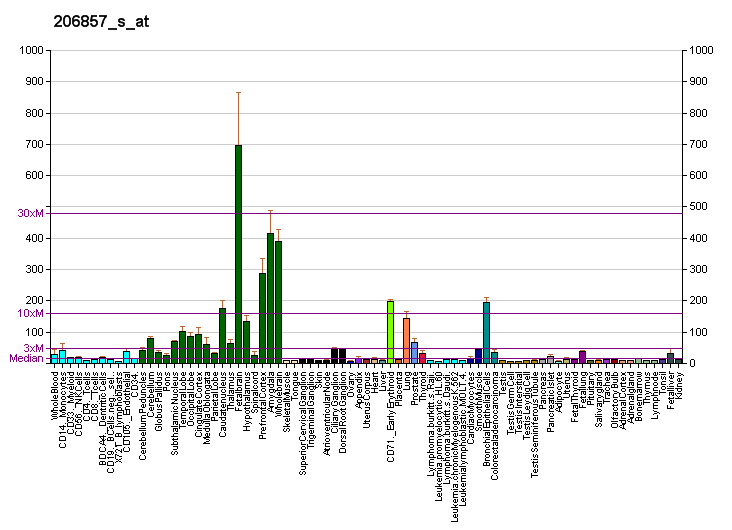

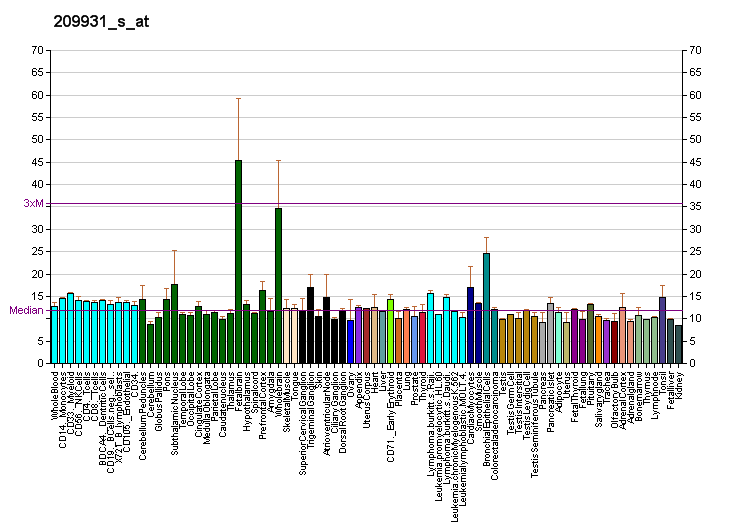
RNA expression pattern
Bgee	Human / Mouse (ortholog); Top expressed in: nucleus accumbens; caudate nucleus; putamen; hippocampus proper; anterior cingulate cortex; temporal lobe; amygdala; dorsolateral prefrontal cortex; right frontal lobe; superior frontal gyrus / Top expressed in: trigeminal ganglion; barrel cortex; spinal ganglia; islet of Langerhans; facial motor nucleus; lumbar spinal ganglion; motor neuron; substantia nigra; CA3 field; medulla oblongata; More reference expression data
BioGPS	More reference expression data
Gene ontology
Molecular function	ryanodine-sensitive calcium-release channel activity; calcium channel inhibitor activity; transmembrane transporter binding; FK506 binding; isomerase activity; peptidyl-prolyl cis-trans isomerase activity; protein binding; signaling receptor binding; cyclic nucleotide binding
Cellular component	cytoplasm; calcium channel complex; intracellular membrane-bounded organelle; membrane; sarcoplasmic reticulum; Z discdkac; sarcoplasmic reticulum membrane; cytosol
Biological process	smooth muscle contraction; regulation of ryanodine-sensitive calcium-release channel activity; release of sequestered calcium ion into cytosol; regulation of cardiac conduction; release of sequestered calcium ion into cytosol by sarcoplasmic reticulum; regulation of cytosolic calcium ion concentration; regulation of cardiac muscle contraction by regulation of the release of sequestered calcium ion; positive regulation of cytosolic calcium ion concentration; cell communication by electrical coupling involved in cardiac conduction; negative regulation of insulin secretion involved in cellular response to glucose stimulus; insulin secretion; response to glucose; positive regulation of axon regeneration; protein maturation by protein folding; response to organic substance; negative regulation of heart rate; response to vitamin E; regulation of heart rate; negative regulation of ryanodine-sensitive calcium-release channel activity; response to redox state; T cell proliferation; ion transmembrane transport; positive regulation of sequestering of calcium ion; neuronal action potential propagation; protein refolding; negative regulation of release of sequestered calcium ion into cytosol; regulation of release of sequestered calcium ion into cytosol by sarcoplasmic reticulum; 'de novo' protein folding; calcium-mediated signaling using intracellular calcium source; response to hydrogen peroxide; chaperone-mediated protein folding; protein peptidyl-prolyl isomerization; negative regulation of phosphoprotein phosphatase activity
Sources:Amigo / QuickGO
Orthologs
Databases	NCBI: entry; OMA: entry
Species	Human	Mouse
Entrez	2281	14226
Ensembl	ENSG00000119782	ENSMUSG00000020635
UniProt	P68106	Q9Z2I2
RefSeq (mRNA)	NM_004116; NM_054033; NM_001322963; NM_001322964	NM_016863; NM_001378816; NM_001378817; NM_001378818
RefSeq (protein)	NP_001309892; NP_001309893; NP_004107; NP_473374	NP_058559; NP_001365745; NP_001365746; NP_001365747
Location (UCSC)	Chr 2: 24.05 – 24.06 Mb	Chr 12: 4.88 – 4.89 Mb
PubMed search
- Wikidata
View/Edit Human	View/Edit Mouse

Peptidyl-prolyl cis-trans isomerase FKBP1B is an enzyme that in humans is encoded by the FKBP1B gene.

== Function ==
The protein encoded by this gene is a member of the immunophilin protein family, which play a role in immunoregulation and basic cellular processes involving protein folding and trafficking. This encoded protein is a cis-trans prolyl isomerase that binds the immunosuppressants FK506 (tacrolimus) and rapamycin (sirolimus). It is highly similar to the FK506-binding protein 1A. Its physiological role is thought to be in excitation-contraction coupling in cardiac muscle. There are two alternatively spliced transcript variants of this gene encoding different isoforms.

== Clinical significance ==
Defective interaction between FKB1B and the ryanodine receptor is thought to be a potential mechanism underlying the arrhythmias seen in those with the genetic condition catecholaminergic polymorphic ventricular tachycardia.
