= FKBP =

FKBP-type peptidyl-prolyl cis-trans isomerase
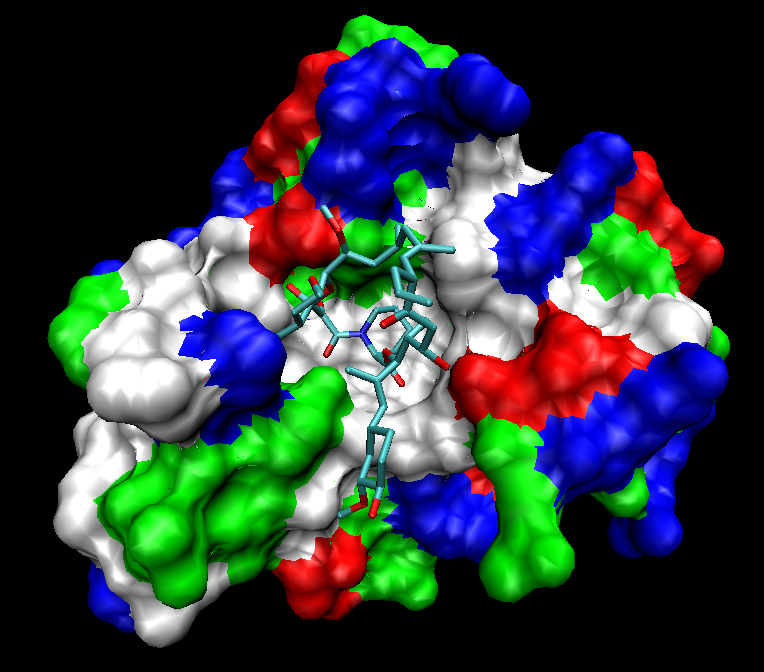
- The human protein FKBP12 bound to FK506 (tacrolimus). The protein surface is colored by hydrophobicity; the deep cleft in which the ligand is bound is hydrophobic.

Identifiers
- Symbol: FKBP_C
- Pfam: PF00254
- InterPro: IPR001179
- PROSITE: PDOC00426
- SCOP2: 1fkb / SCOPe / SUPFAM
- Membranome: 336
Available protein structures:
- PDB: IPR001179 PF00254 (ECOD; PDBsum)
- AlphaFold: IPR001179; PF00254

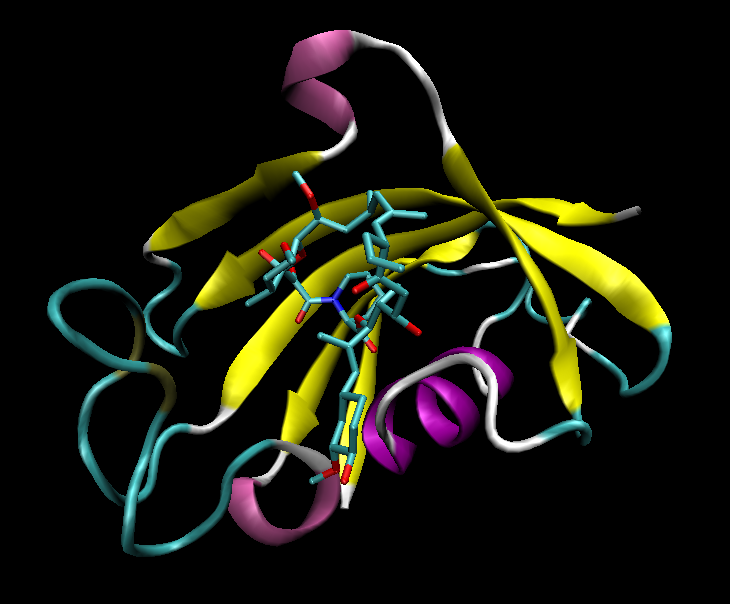
An illustration of the same protein in the same orientation

The FKBPs, or FK506 binding proteins, constitute a family of proteins that have prolyl isomerase activity and are related to the cyclophilins in function, though not in amino acid sequence. FKBPs have been identified in many eukaryotes, ranging from yeast to humans, and function as protein folding chaperones for proteins containing proline residues. Along with cyclophilin, FKBPs belong to the immunophilin family.

FKBP1A (also known as FKBP12) is notable in humans for binding the immunosuppressant molecule tacrolimus (originally designated FK506), which is used in treating patients after organ transplant and patients with autoimmune disorders. Tacrolimus has been found to reduce episodes of organ rejection over a related treatment, the drug ciclosporin, which binds cyclophilin. Both the FKBP-tacrolimus complex and the cyclosporin-cyclophilin complex inhibit a phosphatase called calcineurin, thus blocking signal transduction in the T-lymphocyte transduction pathway. This therapeutic role is not related to its prolyl isomerase activity. FKBP25 is a nuclear FKBP which non-specifically binds with DNA and has a role in DNA repair.

== Use as a biological research tool ==
FKBP (FKBP1A) does not normally form a dimer but will dimerize in the presence of FK1012, a derivative of the drug tacrolimus (FK506). This has made it a useful tool for chemically induced dimerization applications where it can be used to manipulate protein localization, signalling pathways and protein activation.

== Examples ==
Human genes encoding proteins in this family include:

- AIP; AIPL1
- FKBPL; FKBP1A; FKBP1B; FKBP1C; FKBP2; FKBP3; FKBP4; FKBP5; FKBP6; FKBP7; FKBP8; FKBP9; FKBP10; FKBP11; FKBP14; FKBP15;

Pseudogenes in humans:

- FKBP1AP1; FKBP1AP2; FKBP1AP3; FKBP1AP4; FKBP1BP1; FKBP4P1; FKBP4P2; FKBP4P6; FKBP4P7; FKBP4P8; FKBP6P1; FKBP6P2; FKBP9P1;

== See also ==
- Immunophilins
