= Chemically induced dimerization =

Chemically induced dimerization (CID) is a biological mechanism in which two proteins bind only in the presence of a certain small molecule, enzyme or other dimerizing agent. Genetically engineered CID systems are used in biological research to control protein localization, to manipulate signalling pathways and to induce protein activation.

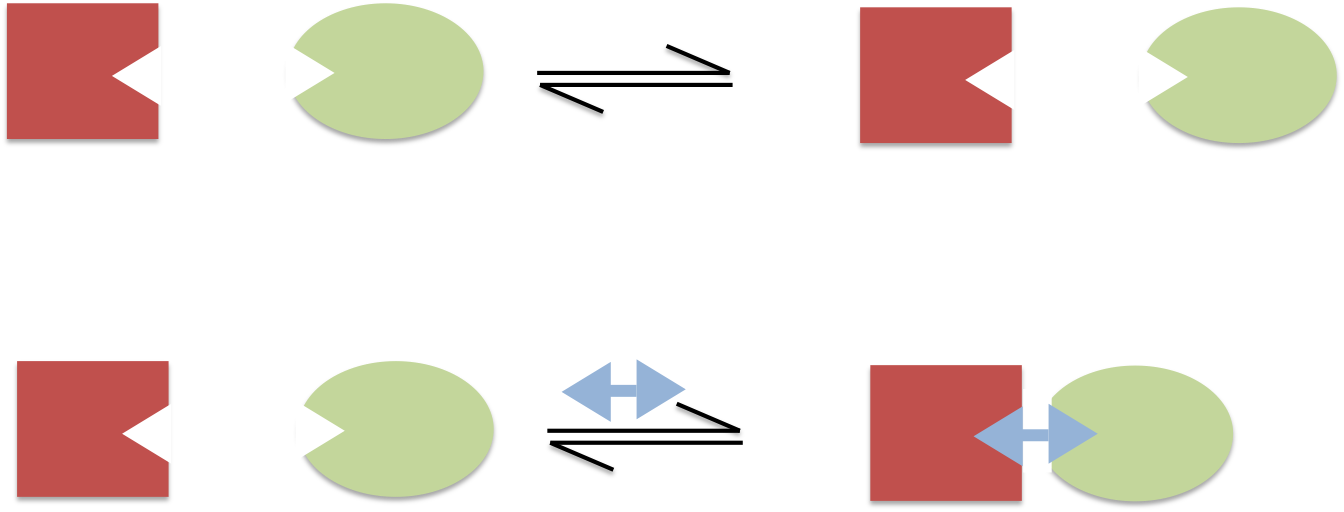
Schematic of chemically induced dimerization. Two proteins that do not normally interact (top) bind in the presence of a dimerizing agent (bottom).

== History ==
The first small molecule CID system was developed in 1993 and used FK1012, a derivative of the drug tacrolimus (FK506), to induce homo-dimerization of FKBP. This system was used in vivo to induce binding between cell surface receptors which could not bind in the normal way because they lacked the transmembrane and extracellular domain. Addition of FK1012 to the cells caused signal transduction.

== Chemically induced dimerization systems ==
Target proteins		Dimerizing agent	References
FKBP	FKBP	FK1012	
FKBP	Calcineurin A (CNA)	FK506	
FKBP	CyP-Fas	FKCsA	
FKBP	FRB (FKBP-rapamycin-binding) domain of mTOR	Rapamycin	
GyrB	GyrB	Coumermycin	
GAI	GID1 (gibberellin insensitive dwarf 1)	Gibberellin	
ABI	PYL	Abscisic acid	
ABI	PYR^{Mandi}	Mandipropamid	
SNAP-tag	HaloTag	HaXS	
eDHFR	HaloTag	TMP-HTag	
Bcl-xL	Fab (AZ1)	ABT-737	
Anti caffeine camelid nanobody	Camelid nanobody (homodimer)	Caffeine	
VH-anti nicotine	VL-anti nicotine	Nicotine	
Anti RR120 camelid nanobody	Camelid nanobody (homodimer)	RR120 (Azo dye)	
^{FIRE}tag	^{FIRE}mate	^{match}550	

== Applications ==
CID has been used for a number of applications in biomedical research. In most applications each dimerizing protein is expressed as part of a fusion construct with other proteins of interest. Adding the chemical dimerizing agent brings both constructs into proximity with each other and induces interactions between the proteins of interest. CID has been used to regulate and monitor gene transcription, signal transduction and post translational modifications in proteins.

Recently, CID has also been used to create a basic component of biocomputers, logic gates, from genetically manipulated cells. In this application, two independent CID systems, one based on plant proteins and one based on bacterial proteins are expressed in the same cell. Each set of proteins can be induced to dimerize by the addition of a separate chemical. By creating fusion proteins with the dimerizing proteins, membrane bound proteins and proteins that activate cell ruffling an AND gate and OR gate can be created that take chemical dimerizing agents as inputs and returns a ruffled or unruffled state as output.
