= FKBP8 =

Protein-coding gene in the species Homo sapiens

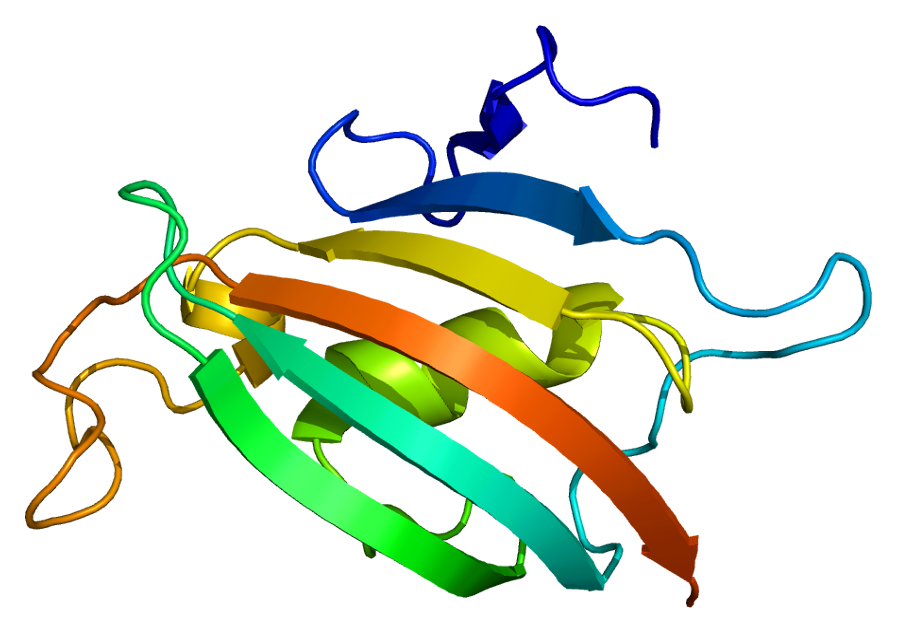

Identifiers
- Aliases: FKBP8, FKBP38, FKBPr38, FK506 binding protein 8, FKBP prolyl isomerase 8
- External IDs: OMIM: 604840; MGI: 1341070; GeneCards: FKBP8
Available structures
PDB	Ortholog search: PDBe RCSB
PDB	List of PDB id codes 2AWG, 2D9F, 2F2D, 2MF9, 3EY6
Enzyme activity
EC #	BRENDA	ExPASy	KEGG	MetaCyc
5.2.1.8	↗	↗	↗	↗

Gene location (Human)
Chr.	Chromosome 19 (human)
Band	19p13.11	Start	18,531,751 bp
Band	19p13.11	End	18,544,077 bp

Gene location (Mouse)
Chr.	Chromosome 8 (mouse)
Band	8|8 B3.3	Start	70,980,374 bp
Band	8|8 B3.3	End	70,987,978 bp
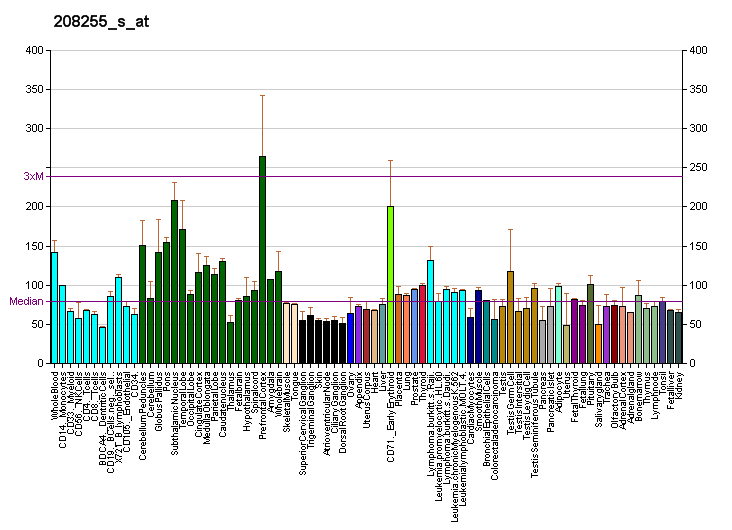

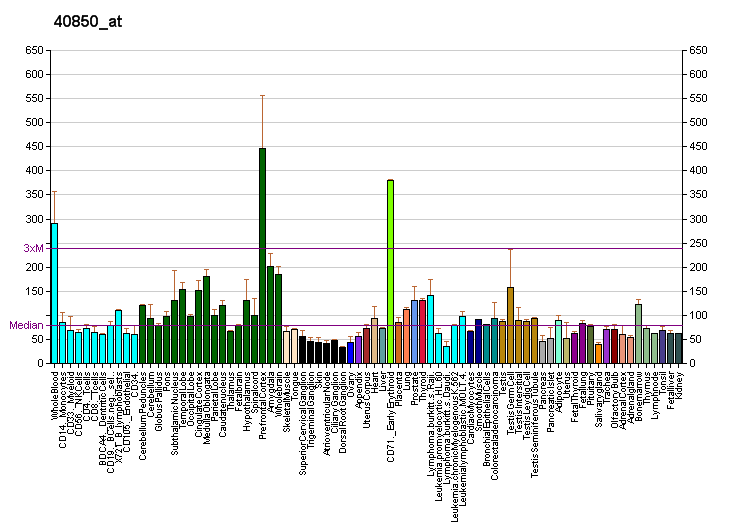
RNA expression pattern
Bgee	Human / Mouse (ortholog); Top expressed in: right frontal lobe; right testis; left testis; right hemisphere of cerebellum; anterior pituitary; C1 segment; cingulate gyrus; anterior cingulate cortex; muscle layer of sigmoid colon; right uterine tube / Top expressed in: superior frontal gyrus; dentate gyrus of hippocampal formation granule cell; primary visual cortex; spermatocyte; neural layer of retina; granulocyte; lip; perirhinal cortex; entorhinal cortex; ventricular zone; More reference expression data
BioGPS	More reference expression data
Gene ontology
Molecular function	FK506 binding; isomerase activity; peptidyl-prolyl cis-trans isomerase activity; metal ion binding; protein binding; identical protein binding; disordered domain specific binding
Cellular component	integral component of membrane; membrane; mitochondrial membranes; integral component of endoplasmic reticulum membrane; mitochondrial envelope; mitochondrion; endoplasmic reticulum; cytosol; cytoplasm; protein-containing complex
Biological process	apoptotic process; intracellular signal transduction; multicellular organism growth; cell fate specification; negative regulation of apoptotic process; regulation of BMP signaling pathway; neural tube development; positive regulation of BMP signaling pathway; regulation of gene expression; smoothened signaling pathway; camera-type eye development; dorsal/ventral neural tube patterning; viral process; dorsal/ventral pattern formation; chaperone-mediated protein folding; protein peptidyl-prolyl isomerization; negative regulation of protein phosphorylation
Sources:Amigo / QuickGO
Orthologs
Databases	NCBI: entry; OMA: entry
Species	Human	Mouse
Entrez	23770	14232
Ensembl	ENSG00000105701	ENSMUSG00000019428
UniProt	Q14318	O35465
RefSeq (mRNA)	NM_001308373; NM_012181	NM_001111066; NM_001199631; NM_010223
RefSeq (protein)	NP_001295302; NP_036313; NP_001295302.1	NP_001104536; NP_001186560; NP_034353
Location (UCSC)	Chr 19: 18.53 – 18.54 Mb	Chr 8: 70.98 – 70.99 Mb
PubMed search
- Wikidata
View/Edit Human	View/Edit Mouse

FK506-binding protein 8 is a protein that in humans is encoded by the FKBP8 gene.

The protein encoded by this gene is a member of the immunophilin protein family, which play a role in immunoregulation and basic cellular processes involving protein folding and trafficking. Unlike the other members of the family, this encoded protein does not seem to have PPIase/rotamase activity. It may have a role in neurons associated with memory function.
