= Peptidyl-prolyl cis-trans isomerase NIMA-interacting 4 =

Protein-coding gene in the species Homo sapiens

PIN4
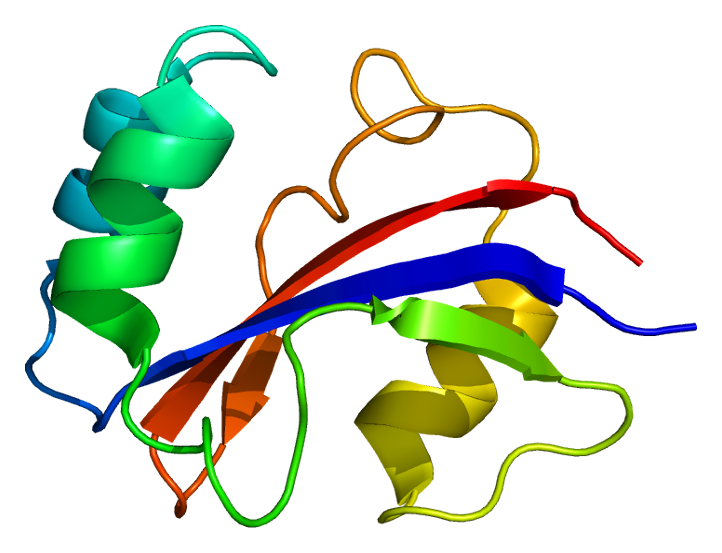

Identifiers
- Aliases: PIN4, EPVH, PAR14, PAR17, peptidylprolyl cis/trans isomerase, NIMA-interacting 4
- External IDs: OMIM: 300252; MGI: 1916963; GeneCards: PIN4
Available structures
PDB	Ortholog search: PDBe RCSB
PDB	List of PDB id codes 1EQ3, 1FJD, 3UI4, 3UI5, 3UI6
Enzyme activity
EC #	BRENDA	ExPASy	KEGG	MetaCyc
5.2.1.8	↗	↗	↗	↗

Gene location (Human)
Chr.	X chromosome (human)
Band	Xq13.1	Start	72,181,353 bp
Band	Xq13.1	End	72,302,926 bp

Gene location (Mouse)
Chr.	X chromosome (mouse)
Band	X|X D	Start	102,119,447 bp
Band	X|X D	End	102,127,669 bp
RNA expression pattern
Bgee	Human / Mouse (ortholog); Top expressed in: tendon of biceps brachii; gingival epithelium; amniotic fluid; germinal epithelium; buccal mucosa cell; hair follicle; pancreatic epithelial cell; pancreatic ductal cell; palpebral conjunctiva; kidney tubule / Top expressed in: yolk sac; lens; epiblast; embryo; duodenum; morula; bone marrow; urinary bladder; embryo; dentate gyrus of hippocampal formation granule cell; More reference expression data
BioGPS	n/a
Gene ontology
Molecular function	DNA binding; double-stranded DNA binding; protein binding; bent DNA binding; isomerase activity; peptidyl-prolyl cis-trans isomerase activity; RNA binding
Cellular component	cytoplasm; mitochondrial matrix; spindle; preribosome; nucleolus; extracellular exosome; cytoskeleton; mitochondrion; nucleus
Biological process	rRNA processing; protein peptidyl-prolyl isomerization
Sources:Amigo / QuickGO
Orthologs
Databases	NCBI: entry; OMA: entry
Species	Human	Mouse
Entrez	5303	69713
Ensembl	ENSG00000102309	ENSMUSG00000079480
UniProt	Q9Y237	Q9CWW6
RefSeq (mRNA)	NM_001170747; NM_006223	NM_027181
RefSeq (protein)	NP_001164218; NP_006214	NP_081457; NP_001352019
Location (UCSC)	Chr X: 72.18 – 72.3 Mb	Chr X: 102.12 – 102.13 Mb
PubMed search
- Wikidata
View/Edit Human	View/Edit Mouse

Peptidyl-prolyl cis-trans isomerase NIMA-interacting 4, also called Par14, is an enzyme that in humans is encoded by the PIN4 gene.

PIN4 is a member of the parvulin family of peptidyl-prolyl-cis/trans-isomerases (PPIases) in humans, which possesses prolyl isomerase activity.

== History ==
In 1999, Par14 was identified by two groups independently. After the discovery of human Pin1 in 1996, Par14 turned out to be the second member of the human parvulin family. In contrast to Pin1, Par14 exhibits minor catalytic activity, shows no preference for phosphorylated substrates and fails to rescue the loss of the Pin1-related parvulin Ess1 in yeast. Par14 orthologs are found in many unicellular eukaryotes and all multicellular organisms. In 2006, a Par14 isoform, denoted Par17 (see § Par17), was described, which carries an N-terminal extension of 25 residues and is exclusively expressed in hominids.

== Expression and localization ==
Par14 originates from transcription of the PIN4 gene on chromosome Xq13.1. The promotor region is TATA-less and located within a CpG island. The protein is primarily active within the nucleus/nucleolus of the cell, but also found within the cytoplasm.

== Biological function ==
Cytoplasm: Par14 interacts with the insulin receptor substrate (IRS-1) and enhances insulin-induced tyrosine-phosphorylation of IRS-1. During mitosis Par14 associates to the spindle apparatus. In vitro experiments demonstrated that Par14 may be involved in filament polymerization.

Nucleus/Nucleolus: Phosphorylation of Ser19 by casein kinase 2 translocates Par14 into the cellular nucleus. After dephosphorylation the protein associates to chromatin, with the N-terminus mainly responsible for high-affinity DNA binding. Par14 is found in pre-ribosomal ribonuclear protein complexes, where it acts as an rRNA processing factor. Photoaffinity labeling and Liquid chromatography–mass spectrometry analysis reveal the enzyme to be associated with proteins functioning in DNA replication, DNA repair and/or chromatin remodeling. Par14 requires phosphorylation of Ser7 and Ser9 by protein kinase B (Akt) (or protein kinase C) for nuclear export. This export is probably maintained by 14-3-3 protein in a Crm1 dependent way.

== Structure ==
Par14’s catalytic domain exhibits the typical parvulin fold (order of secondary structure elements β1-α1-α2-h-β2-α3-β3-β4; α = α-helix, β = β-strand, h = helical turn) found in all members of this family, so far. Its three-dimensional structure PDB-ID: 3UI4 PDB-ID: 1EQ3 is characterized by a ‘gripping hand’ topology with the central β-sheet core (consisting of four antiparallel strands) opposing α-helix 3. The catalytic center resides on the concave side of the β-sheet. An N-terminal IDR-like stretch composed of mainly small or basic residues precedes this domain. The IDR element is prone to post-translational modifications.

== Disease related function/clinical aspects ==
Par14 is involved in the upregulation of hepatitis B virus replication. Expression of Par14 correlates to primary biliary cirrhosis, an autoimmune chronic cholestatic liver disease. K-RAS exosomes of collateral cancer cells were found to carry Par14.

== Par17 ==
Par17, a member of the parvulin family of peptidyl-prolyl-cis/trans-isomerases (PPIases), is an isoform of PIN4/Par14 and originates from alternative transcription initiation of the PIN4 gene. Par17, which carries a 25 residue N-terminal extension, shares the complete successive amino acid sequence with Par14. In contrast to Par14, Par17 is exclusively expressed in Hominidae, as ORFs were only found within the genomes of orangutans, gorillas, chimpanzees and humans. The N-terminal extension seems to be responsible for the translocation of Par17 to the mitochondrial matrix. Par17 is involved in tubulin and actin polymerization as well as in hepatitis B virus replication. Using photoaffinity labeling and liquid chromatography–mass spectrometry analysis, Par17 was found to be associated with mitochondrial proteins such as members of the electron transport chain in human cells.
