= NKTR =

Protein-coding gene in the species Homo sapiens

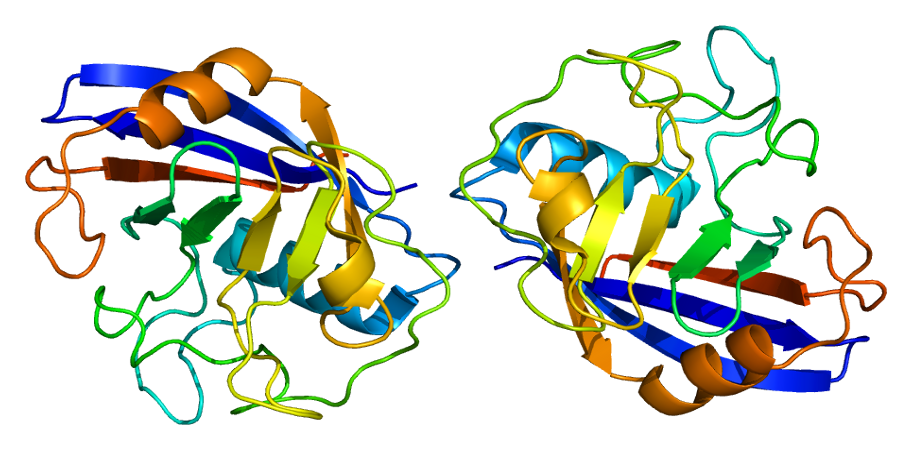
Available structures
PDB	Ortholog search: PDBe RCSB
PDB	List of PDB id codes 2HE9

Identifiers
- Aliases: NKTR, p104, natural killer cell triggering receptor
- External IDs: OMIM: 161565; MGI: 97346; HomoloGene: 122148; GeneCards: NKTR; OMA:NKTR - orthologs

Gene location (Human)
Chr.	Chromosome 3 (human)
Band	3p22.1	Start	42,600,655 bp
Band	3p22.1	End	42,648,735 bp

Gene location (Mouse)
Chr.	Chromosome 9 (mouse)
Band	9 F4|9 72.57 cM	Start	121,719,169 bp
Band	9 F4|9 72.57 cM	End	121,756,843 bp
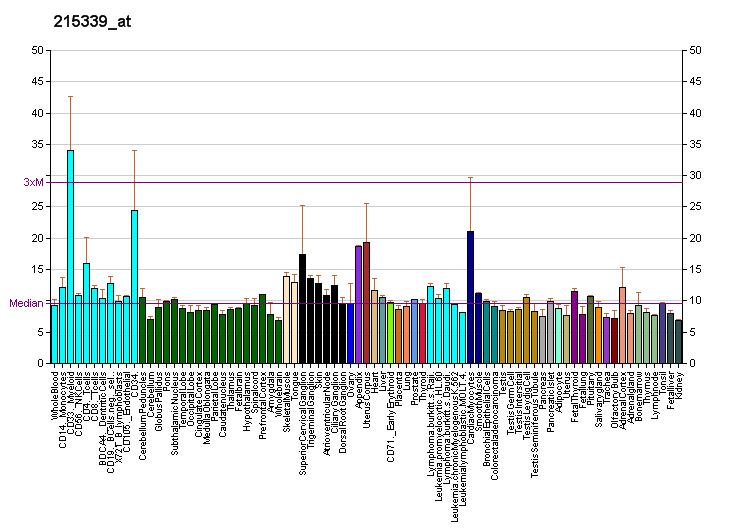
RNA expression pattern
Bgee	Human / Mouse (ortholog); Top expressed in: pylorus; cardia; caput epididymis; tail of epididymis; optic nerve; Achilles tendon; corpus epididymis; superior surface of tongue; visceral pleura; corpus callosum / Top expressed in: ascending aorta; neural layer of retina; aortic valve; tail of embryo; genital tubercle; cerebellar cortex; dorsomedial hypothalamic nucleus; Rostral migratory stream; habenula; superior frontal gyrus; More reference expression data
BioGPS	More reference expression data
Gene ontology
Molecular function	isomerase activity; peptidyl-prolyl cis-trans isomerase activity; cyclosporin A binding; unfolded protein binding
Cellular component	membrane; nucleoplasm; mitochondrion; cytosol; plasma membrane; nucleus
Biological process	protein folding; protein peptidyl-prolyl isomerization; protein refolding
Sources:Amigo / QuickGO
Orthologs
Species	Human	Mouse
Entrez	4820	18087
Ensembl	ENSG00000114857	ENSMUSG00000032525
UniProt	P30414	P30415
RefSeq (mRNA)	NM_001012651; NM_005385; NM_001349124; NM_001349125; NM_001349126	NM_010918
RefSeq (protein)	NP_005376; NP_001336053; NP_001336054; NP_001336055	NP_035048
Location (UCSC)	Chr 3: 42.6 – 42.65 Mb	Chr 9: 121.72 – 121.76 Mb
PubMed search
- Wikidata
View/Edit Human	View/Edit Mouse

NK-tumor recognition protein is a protein that in humans is encoded by the NKTR gene.

This gene encodes a membrane-anchored protein with a hydrophobic amino terminal domain and a cyclophilin-like PPIase domain. It is present on the surface of natural killer cells and facilitates their binding to targets. Its expression is regulated by IL2 activation of the cells.
