= SAFit2 =

Chemical compound

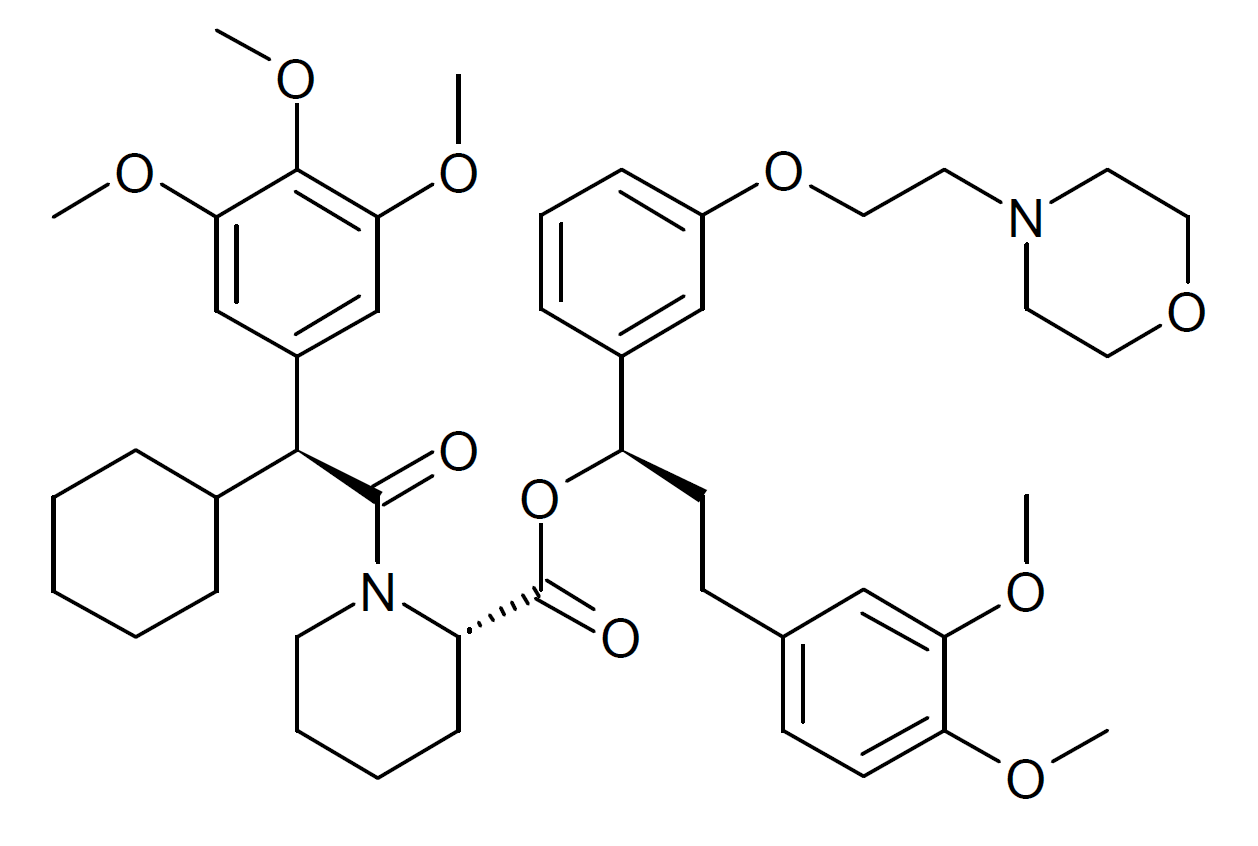

Legal status
- Legal status: US: Investigational drug

Identifiers
- IUPAC name: [(1R)-3-(3,4-dimethoxyphenyl)-1-[3-(2-morpholin-4-ylethoxy)phenyl]propyl] (2S)-1-[(2S)-2-cyclohexyl-2-(3,4,5-trimethoxyphenyl)acetyl]piperidine-2-carboxylate
- CAS Number: 1643125-33-0
- PubChem CID: 86277887
- ChemSpider: 32779480
- ChEMBL: ChEMBL3623630

Chemical and physical data
- Formula: C_{46}H_{62}N_{2}O_{10}
- Molar mass: 803.006 g·mol^{−1}
- 3D model (JSmol): Interactive image
- SMILES: COC1=C(C=C(C=C1)CC[C@H](C2=CC(=CC=C2)OCCN3CCOCC3)OC(=O)[C@@H]4CCCCN4C(=O)[C@@H](C5CCCCC5)C6=CC(=C(C(=C6)OC)OC)OC)OC
- InChI: InChI=1S/C46H62N2O10/c1-51-39-20-18-32(28-40(39)52-2)17-19-38(34-14-11-15-36(29-34)57-27-24-47-22-25-56-26-23-47)58-46(50)37-16-9-10-21-48(37)45(49)43(33-12-7-6-8-13-33)35-30-41(53-3)44(55-5)42(31-35)54-4/h11,14-15,18,20,28-31,33,37-38,43H,6-10,12-13,16-17,19,21-27H2,1-5H3/t37-,38+,43-/m0/s1; Key:ZDBWLRLGUBSLPG-FDHYQTMZSA-N

SAFit2 is a drug which acts as a potent and selective inhibitor of the signalling factor FK506 binding protein 51 (FKBP51), which is involved in the downstream response to glucocorticoid release in the body. Since elevated glucocorticoid levels are a characteristic marker of chronic stress, blocking glucocorticoid signalling pathways using SAFit2 has been shown to counteract many of the associated symptoms such as obesity, chronic pain, depression and anxiety, and addiction. While SAFit2 itself is a relatively large molecule and is unlikely to have suitable properties to be developed for medical use, it has demonstrated that inhibition of FKBP51 may be a useful therapeutic approach for alleviating consequences of long-term chronic stress and pain.

== See also ==
- Sirolimus
- Tacrolimus
