= FKBPL =

Protein-coding gene in the species Homo sapiens

Identifiers
- Aliases: FKBPL, DIR1, NG7, WISP39, FKBP4, FK506 binding protein like, FKBP prolyl isomerase like
- External IDs: OMIM: 617076; MGI: 1932127; GeneCards: FKBPL

Gene location (Human)
Chr.	Chromosome 6 (human)
Band	6p21.32	Start	32,128,707 bp
Band	6p21.32	End	32,130,288 bp

Gene location (Mouse)
Chr.	Chromosome 17 (mouse)
Band	17|17 B1	Start	34,863,738 bp
Band	17|17 B1	End	34,865,298 bp
RNA expression pattern
Bgee	Human / Mouse (ortholog); Top expressed in: testicle; gonad; skin of leg; granulocyte; skin of abdomen; mucosa of transverse colon; islet of Langerhans; apex of heart; body of stomach; blood / Top expressed in: seminiferous tubule; spermatid; spermatocyte; primary oocyte; granulocyte; muscle of thigh; embryo; right kidney; secondary oocyte; embryo; More reference expression data
BioGPS	n/a
Gene ontology
Molecular function	protein binding
Cellular component	cytosol; extracellular region
Biological process	response to radiation; protein stabilization; regulation of angiogenesis; regulation of blood vessel branching
Sources:Amigo / QuickGO
Orthologs
Databases	NCBI: entry; OMA: entry
Species	Human	Mouse
Entrez	63943	56299
Ensembl	ENSG00000204315; ENSG00000230907; ENSG00000224200; ENSG00000223666	ENSMUSG00000033739
UniProt	Q9UIM3	O35450
RefSeq (mRNA)	NM_022110	NM_019873
RefSeq (protein)	NP_071393; NP_071393.2	NP_063926
Location (UCSC)	Chr 6: 32.13 – 32.13 Mb	Chr 17: 34.86 – 34.87 Mb
PubMed search
- Wikidata
View/Edit Human	View/Edit Mouse

FK506-binding protein like, also known as FKBPL, is a protein that in humans is encoded by the FKBPL gene.

== Function ==
FKBPL has similarity to the immunophilin protein family, which play a role in immunoregulation and basic cellular processes involving protein folding and trafficking. The encoded protein is thought to have a potential role in the induced radioresistance. Also it appears to have some involvement in the control of the cell cycle.

FKBPL is involved in cellular response to stress. It was first isolated in 1999 and was initially named DIR1. It was later reclassified because of its homology to the FKBP family of proteins and was renamed FKBP-like (FKBPL). A separate study that found it to be involved in the stabilisation of newly synthesised p21 termed it Wisp39.

It is known to interact with Hsp90, glucocorticoid receptor and dynamitin and may play a role in signalling, like other FKBPs.

FKBPL has also been shown to influence estrogen receptor signalling and can have a determinant effect on response to the breast cancer drug tamoxifen.
