= FK1012 =

Dimer for protein manipulation

Names
- IUPAC name (1R,12S,13R,14S,18E,21S,23S,24R,25R,27R)-1,14-Dihydroxy-17-{(2E)-4-[(12S,13R,14S,17R,18E,21S,23S,24R,25R,27R)-14-hydroxy-12-{(1E)-1-[(1R,3R,4R)-4-hydroxy-3-methoxycyclohexyl]-1-propen-2-yl}-23,25-dimethoxy-13,19,21,27-tetramethyl-2,3,10,16-tetraoxo-11,28-dioxa-4-azatricyclo[22.3.1.0^{4,9}]octacos-18-en-17-yl]-2-buten-1-yl}-12-{(1E)-1-[(1R,3R,4R)-4-hydroxy-3-methoxycyclohexyl]-1-propen-2-yl}-23,25-dimethoxy-13,19,21,27-tetramethyl-11,28-dioxa-4-azatricyclo[22.3.1.0^{4,9}]octacos-18-ene-2,3,10,16-tetrone

Identifiers
3D model (JSmol)	Interactive image
ChEMBL	ChEMBL405628
ChemSpider	23193198
PubChem CID	44337639
- InChI: InChI=1S/C86H134N2O23/c1-47-33-49(3)37-71(104-13)79-73(106-15)41-53(7)78(108-79)75(95)82(97)87-31-21-19-25-61(87)84(99)109-76(51(5)39-57-27-29-63(89)69(43-57)102-11)55(9)65(91)45-67(93)59(35-47)23-17-18-24-60-36-48(2)34-50(4)38-72(105-14)80-74(107-16)42-54(8)86(101,111-80)81(96)83(98)88-32-22-20-26-62(88)85(100)110-77(56(10)66(92)46-68(60)94)52(6)40-58-28-30-64(90)70(44-58)103-12/h17-18,35-36,39-40,49-50,53-66,69-74,76-80,89-92,101H,19-34,37-38,41-46H2,1-16H3/b18-17+,47-35+,48-36+,51-39+,52-40+/t49-,50-,53+,54+,55+,56+,57-,58-,59+,60?,61?,62?,63+,64+,65-,66-,69+,70+,71-,72-,73+,74+,76+,77+,78?,79+,80+,86+/m0/s1 Key: IOISFHIZCFPBTB-HSZXOJBTSA-N
- SMILES: C[C@@H]1C[C@@H]([C@@H]2[C@@H](C[C@H](C(O2)C(=O)C(=O)N3CCCCC3C(=O)O[C@@H]([C@@H]([C@H](CC(=O)[C@@H](/C=C(/C1)\C)C/C=C/CC4/C=C(/C[C@@H](C[C@@H]([C@@H]5[C@@H](C[C@H]([C@@](O5)(C(=O)C(=O)N6CCCCC6C(=O)O[C@@H]([C@@H]([C@H](CC4=O)O)C)/C(=C/[C@@H]7CC[C@H]([C@@H](C7)OC)O)/C)O)C)OC)OC)C)\C)O)C)/C(=C/[C@@H]8CC[C@H]([C@@H](C8)OC)O)/C)C)OC)OC

Properties
Chemical formula	C_{86}H_{134}N_{2}O_{23}
Molar mass	1564.009 g·mol^{−1}
- Except where otherwise noted, data are given for materials in their standard state (at 25 °C [77 °F], 100 kPa). Infobox references

FK1012 is a dimer consisting of two molecules of tacrolimus (FK506) linked via their vinyl groups. It is used as a research tool in chemically induced dimerization applications. FK1012 is a chemical inducer of dimerization (CID) which makes the protein capable of dimerization or oligomerization of fusion proteins containing one or more FKBP12 domains. It is used in pharmacology to act as a mediator in the formation of FK506 dimer. FK506 binding proteins (FKBPs) do not normally form dimers but can be caused to dimerize in the presence of FK1012. Genetically engineered proteins based on FKBPs can be used to manipulate protein localization, signaling pathways and protein activation.
