= FKBP7 =

Protein-coding gene in the species Homo sapiens

Identifiers
- Aliases: FKBP7, FKBP23, PPIase, FK506 binding protein 7, FKBP prolyl isomerase 7
- External IDs: OMIM: 607062; MGI: 1336879; GeneCards: FKBP7
Enzyme activity
EC #	BRENDA	ExPASy	KEGG	MetaCyc
5.2.1.8	↗	↗	↗	↗

Gene location (Human)
Chr.	Chromosome 2 (human)
Band	2q31.2	Start	178,463,664 bp
Band	2q31.2	End	178,478,600 bp

Gene location (Mouse)
Chr.	Chromosome 2 (mouse)
Band	2 C3|2 45.09 cM	Start	76,493,388 bp
Band	2 C3|2 45.09 cM	End	76,503,460 bp
RNA expression pattern
Bgee	Human / Mouse (ortholog); Top expressed in: stromal cell of endometrium; Achilles tendon; left ovary; right ovary; sperm; tendon of biceps brachii; smooth muscle tissue; canal of the cervix; tibia; Descending thoracic aorta / Top expressed in: calvaria; body of femur; lower jaw; tooth; molar; efferent ductule; dermis; Meckel's cartilage; fossa; atrioventricular valve; More reference expression data
BioGPS	n/a
Gene ontology
Molecular function	calcium ion binding; FK506 binding; protein binding; isomerase activity; peptidyl-prolyl cis-trans isomerase activity; metal ion binding
Cellular component	endoplasmic reticulum lumen; endoplasmic reticulum; cytoplasm
Biological process	chaperone-mediated protein folding; protein peptidyl-prolyl isomerization
Sources:Amigo / QuickGO
Orthologs
Databases	NCBI: entry; OMA: entry
Species	Human	Mouse
Entrez	51661	14231
Ensembl	ENSG00000079150	ENSMUSG00000002732
UniProt	Q9Y680	O54998
RefSeq (mRNA)	NM_001135212; NM_016105; NM_181342	NM_010222; NM_001355079; NM_001355080
RefSeq (protein)	NP_001128684; NP_851939	NP_034352; NP_001342008; NP_001342009
Location (UCSC)	Chr 2: 178.46 – 178.48 Mb	Chr 2: 76.49 – 76.5 Mb
PubMed search
- Wikidata
View/Edit Human	View/Edit Mouse

FK506 binding protein 7 is a protein that in humans is encoded by the FKBP7 gene. The gene is also known as FKBP23 and PPIase. FKBP7 belongs to the FKBP-type peptidyl-prolyl cis/trans isomerase (PPIase) family. Members of this family exhibit PPIase activity and function as molecular chaperones. The orthologous protein in mouse is located in the endoplasmic reticulum and binds calcium.
