= YY1AP1 =

Protein-coding gene in humans

Identifiers
- Aliases: YY1AP1, HCCA1, HCCA2, YAP, YY1AP, YY1 associated protein 1, GRNG
- External IDs: OMIM: 607860; GeneCards: YY1AP1

Gene location (Human)
Chr.	Chromosome 1 (human)
Band	1q22	Start	155,659,443 bp
Band	1q22	End	155,689,000 bp
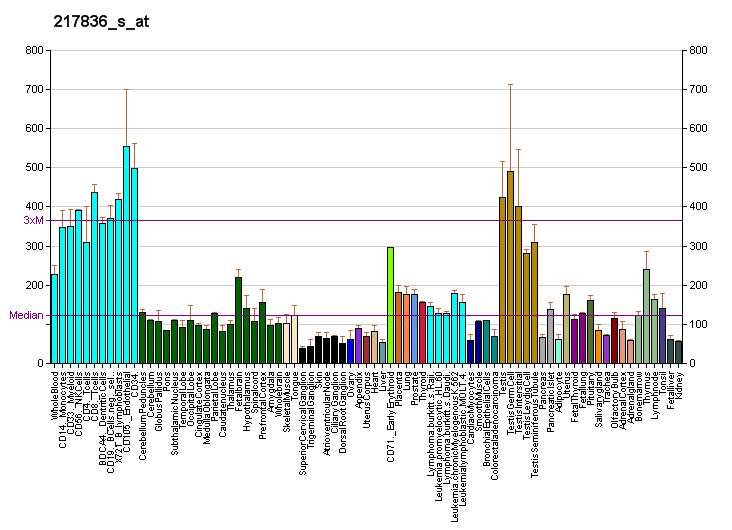
RNA expression pattern
Bgee	Human / Mouse (ortholog); Top expressed in: Achilles tendon; oocyte; secondary oocyte; right testis; left testis; blood; corpus callosum; gastrocnemius muscle; mucosa of pharynx; saphenous vein / n/a; More reference expression data
BioGPS	More reference expression data
Gene ontology
Molecular function	protein binding
Cellular component	cytoplasm; nucleus; fibrillar center; Ino80 complex; nucleoplasm; nucleolus
Biological process	regulation of transcription, DNA-templated; transcription, DNA-templated; cell differentiation; regulation of cell cycle; cell population proliferation
Sources:Amigo / QuickGO
Orthologs
Databases	NCBI: entry; OMA: entry
Species	Human	Mouse
Entrez	55249	n/a
Ensembl	ENSG00000163374	n/a
UniProt	Q9H869	n/a
RefSeq (mRNA)	NM_001198899; NM_001198900; NM_001198901; NM_001198902; NM_001198903 NM_001198904; NM_001198905; NM_001198906; NM_018253; NM_139118; NM_139119; NM_139120; NM_139121	n/a
RefSeq (protein)	NP_001185828; NP_001185829; NP_001185830; NP_001185831; NP_001185832 NP_001185833; NP_001185834; NP_001185835; NP_060723; NP_620829; NP_620830; NP_620832	n/a
Location (UCSC)	Chr 1: 155.66 – 155.69 Mb	n/a
PubMed search		n/a
- Wikidata
View/Edit Human

YY1-associated protein 1 is a protein that in humans is encoded by the YY1AP1 gene.

The encoded gene product presumably interacts with YY1 protein; however, its exact function is not known. Alternative splicing results in multiple transcript variants encoding different isoforms.
