= GLMN =

Protein-coding gene in humans

Identifiers
- Aliases: GLMN, FAP, FAP48, FAP68, FKBPAP, GLML, GVM, VMGLOM, glomulin, FKBP associated protein
- External IDs: OMIM: 601749; MGI: 2141180; GeneCards: GLMN
Available structures
PDB	Ortholog search: PDBe RCSB
PDB	List of PDB id codes 4F52

Gene location (Human)
Chr.	Chromosome 1 (human)
Band	1p22.1	Start	92,246,402 bp
Band	1p22.1	End	92,298,987 bp

Gene location (Mouse)
Chr.	Chromosome 5 (mouse)
Band	5|5 F	Start	107,696,833 bp
Band	5|5 F	End	107,745,754 bp
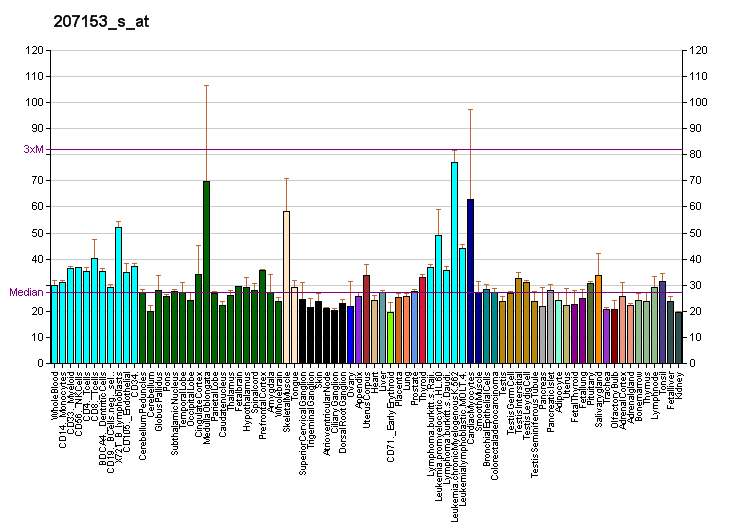
RNA expression pattern
Bgee	Human / Mouse (ortholog); Top expressed in: gonad; testicle; cerebellar hemisphere; right hemisphere of cerebellum; gastric mucosa; Brodmann area 9; right frontal lobe; granulocyte; left ovary; right ovary / Top expressed in: neural layer of retina; spermatocyte; spermatid; zygote; secondary oocyte; tail of embryo; primary oocyte; epiblast; embryo; otic placode; More reference expression data
BioGPS	More reference expression data
Gene ontology
Molecular function	ubiquitin-protein transferase inhibitor activity; protein binding; ubiquitin protein ligase binding; hepatocyte growth factor receptor binding
Cellular component	Cul4A-RING E3 ubiquitin ligase complex; Cul2-RING ubiquitin ligase complex; cullin-RING ubiquitin ligase complex; Cul3-RING ubiquitin ligase complex; intracellular anatomical structure; cytoplasm
Biological process	vasculogenesis; muscle cell differentiation; negative regulation of T cell proliferation; neural tube closure; positive regulation of phosphorylation; circulatory system development; regulation of gene expression, epigenetic; regulation of proteasomal ubiquitin-dependent protein catabolic process; negative regulation of protein ubiquitination
Sources:Amigo / QuickGO
Orthologs
Databases	NCBI: entry; OMA: entry
Species	Human	Mouse
Entrez	11146	170823
Ensembl	ENSG00000174842	ENSMUSG00000029276
UniProt	Q92990	Q8BZM1
RefSeq (mRNA)	NM_007070; NM_053274; NM_001319683	NM_001161738; NM_001161739; NM_133248
RefSeq (protein)	NP_001306612; NP_444504	NP_001155210; NP_001155211; NP_573511
Location (UCSC)	Chr 1: 92.25 – 92.3 Mb	Chr 5: 107.7 – 107.75 Mb
PubMed search
- Wikidata
View/Edit Human	View/Edit Mouse

Glomulin is a protein that in humans is encoded by the GLMN gene.

This gene encodes a phosphorylated protein that is a member of a Skp1-Cullin-F-box-like complex. The protein is essential for normal development of the vasculature and mutations in this gene have been associated with glomuvenous malformations, also called glomangiomas. Alternatively spliced variants that encode different protein isoforms have been described but the full-length nature of only one has been determined.

== Interactions ==
GLMN has been shown to interact with FKBP4, C-Met and FKBP1A.
