= FKBP4 =

Protein-coding gene in humans

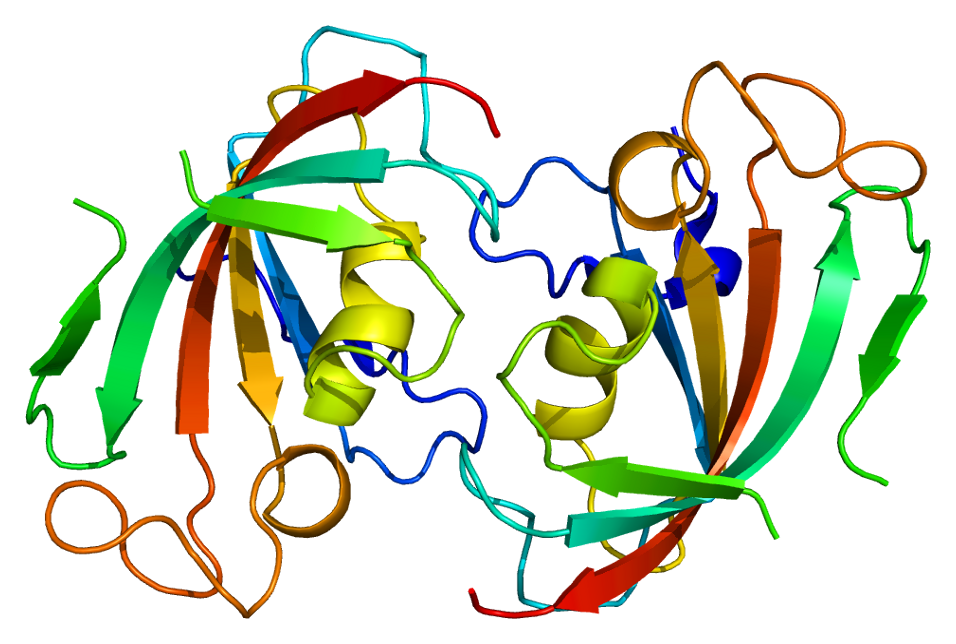

Identifiers
- Aliases: FKBP4, FKBP51, FKBP52, FKBP59, HBI, Hsp56, PPIase, p52, FK506 binding protein 4, FKBP prolyl isomerase 4
- External IDs: OMIM: 600611; MGI: 95543; GeneCards: FKBP4
Available structures
PDB	Ortholog search: PDBe RCSB
PDB	List of PDB id codes 1N1A, 1P5Q, 1Q1C, 1QZ2, 4DRJ, 4LAV, 4LAW, 4LAX, 4LAY, 4TW8
Enzyme activity
EC #	BRENDA	ExPASy	KEGG	MetaCyc
5.2.1.8	↗	↗	↗	↗

Gene location (Human)
Chr.	Chromosome 12 (human)
Band	12p13.33	Start	2,794,970 bp
Band	12p13.33	End	2,805,423 bp

Gene location (Mouse)
Chr.	Chromosome 6 (mouse)
Band	6|6 F3	Start	128,406,698 bp
Band	6|6 F3	End	128,415,640 bp
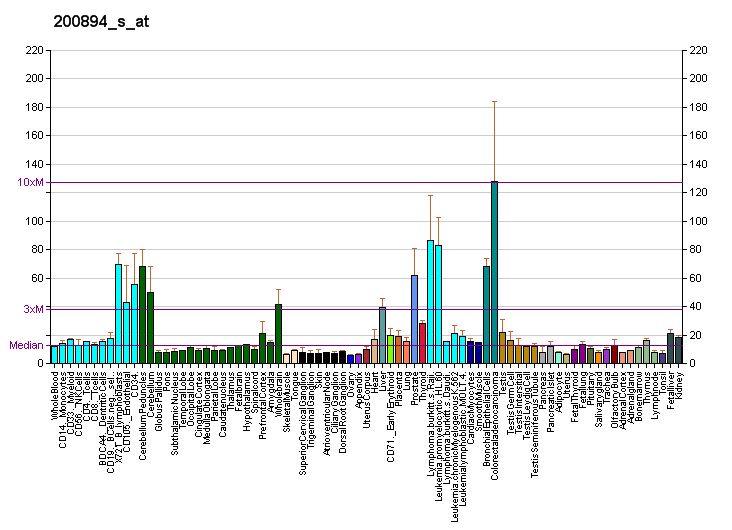

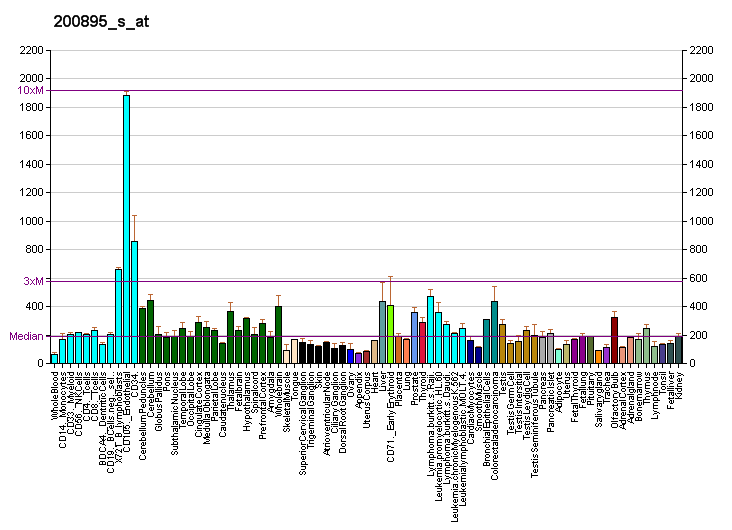
RNA expression pattern
Bgee	Human / Mouse (ortholog); Top expressed in: right hemisphere of cerebellum; ventricular zone; mucosa of transverse colon; islet of Langerhans; ganglionic eminence; right frontal lobe; body of pancreas; left testis; right testis; olfactory bulb / Top expressed in: Ileal epithelium; epiblast; otic vesicle; primitive streak; somite; mandibular prominence; maxillary prominence; embryo; spermatocyte; yolk sac; More reference expression data
BioGPS	More reference expression data
Gene ontology
Molecular function	protein-macromolecule adaptor activity; heat shock protein binding; copper-dependent protein binding; FK506 binding; GTP binding; isomerase activity; peptidyl-prolyl cis-trans isomerase activity; phosphoprotein binding; protein binding; glucocorticoid receptor binding; tau protein binding; ATP binding; RNA binding
Cellular component	cell projection; axonal growth cone; nucleoplasm; axon; soma; mitochondrion; perinuclear region of cytoplasm; neuron projection; microtubule; extracellular exosome; cytoskeleton; nucleus; cytoplasm; cytosol; protein-containing complex
Biological process	androgen receptor signaling pathway; negative regulation of neuron projection development; negative regulation of microtubule polymerization; prostate gland development; protein peptidyl-prolyl isomerization; reproductive structure development; male sex differentiation; negative regulation of microtubule polymerization or depolymerization; regulation of cellular response to heat; protein-containing complex localization; copper ion transport; steroid hormone receptor complex assembly; embryo implantation; chaperone-mediated protein folding; protein folding
Sources:Amigo / QuickGO
Orthologs
Databases	NCBI: entry; OMA: entry
Species	Human	Mouse
Entrez	2288	14228
Ensembl	ENSG00000004478	ENSMUSG00000030357
UniProt	Q02790	P30416
RefSeq (mRNA)	NM_002014	NM_010219
RefSeq (protein)	NP_002005	NP_034349
Location (UCSC)	Chr 12: 2.79 – 2.81 Mb	Chr 6: 128.41 – 128.42 Mb
PubMed search
- Wikidata
View/Edit Human	View/Edit Mouse

FK506-binding protein 4 is a protein that in humans is encoded by the FKBP4 gene.

== Structure ==
This protein contains TPR repeats and has a PPlase domain.

== Function ==
The protein encoded by this gene is a member of the immunophilin protein family, which play a role in immunoregulation and basic cellular processes involving protein folding and trafficking. This encoded protein is a cis-trans prolyl isomerase that binds to the immunosuppressants FK506 and rapamycin. It has high structural and functional similarity to FK506-binding protein 1A (FKBP1A), but unlike FKBP1A, this protein does not have immunosuppressant activity when complexed with FK506. It interacts with interferon regulatory factor-4 and plays an important role in immunoregulatory gene expression in B and T lymphocytes. This encoded protein is known to associate with phytanoyl-CoA alpha-hydroxylase. It can also associate with two heat shock proteins (hsp90 and hsp70) and thus may play a role in the intracellular trafficking of hetero-oligomeric forms of the steroid hormone receptors. This protein correlates strongly with adeno-associated virus type 2 vectors (AAV) resulting in a significant increase in AAV-mediated transgene expression in human cell lines. Thus this encoded protein is thought to have important implications for the optimal use of AAV vectors in human gene therapy.

== Clinical significance ==
Recent research suggests that FKBP4 may play a role in preventing the Tau protein from turning pathogenic. This may prove significant for the development of new Alzheimer's drugs and for detecting the disease before the onset of clinical symptoms.

== Interactions ==
FKBP4 has been shown to interact with GLMN.

== See also ==
- Glucocorticoid receptor
- Immunophilins
- FKBP5
- FKBP3 - A DNA binding FKBP.
