= Glomangiosarcoma =

Cancer originating in glomus bodies

- Other names: Malignant glomus tumor
- Specialty: Dermatology

Glomangiosarcoma is a low grade tumor of the soft tissue. They rarely metastasize, but metastases are possible. It is also known as malignant glomus tumor. Positive staining for vimentin has been reported.

== Signs and symptoms ==
Glomangiosarcoma usually manifest as painful blue-red dermal nodules that range from 0.5-2cm in size.

== Causes ==
Glomangiosarcomas can arise de novo or from a preexisting benign glomus tumour.

== Diagnosis ==
Typically, a definitive diagnosis cannot be made based solely on radiologic findings and clinical symptoms. To get a conclusive diagnosis of glomangiosarcoma, immunohistochemical staining in addition to hematoxylin and eosin staining is needed.

Histologically, glomangiosarcomas differ from benign glomus tumors in that they include sheets of uniform, round to oval cells with eosinophilic cytoplasm, many vascular spaces, and cellular pleomorphism linked to frequent mitotic figures.

Glomangiosarcomas display many of the same antigens as their benign counterparts on immunohistochemical labeling; these antigens include vimentin, smooth muscle actin, and muscle-specific actin. On the other hand, benign tumors stain more highly for actin and myosin, and malignant tumors stain more intensely for vimentin. Studies conducted in the past have also revealed changes in the expression of Bcl-2 and p53 in comparison to benign glomus tumors.

These lesions in soft tissue and skin need to be distinguished from other cutaneous round cell malignancies such hemangiopericytoma, leiomyosarcoma, melanoma, and Merkel cell carcinoma.

== Treatment ==
Although Mohs micrographic surgery has been previously described, the standard of care for malignant glomus tumors still involves wide local excision with negative surgical margins. It is not currently advised to use adjuvant chemotherapy for primary glomangiosarcoma.

== See also ==
- Angiosarcoma
- Glomus tumor
