= Glomus tumor =

Tumor originating from a glomus body in the skin

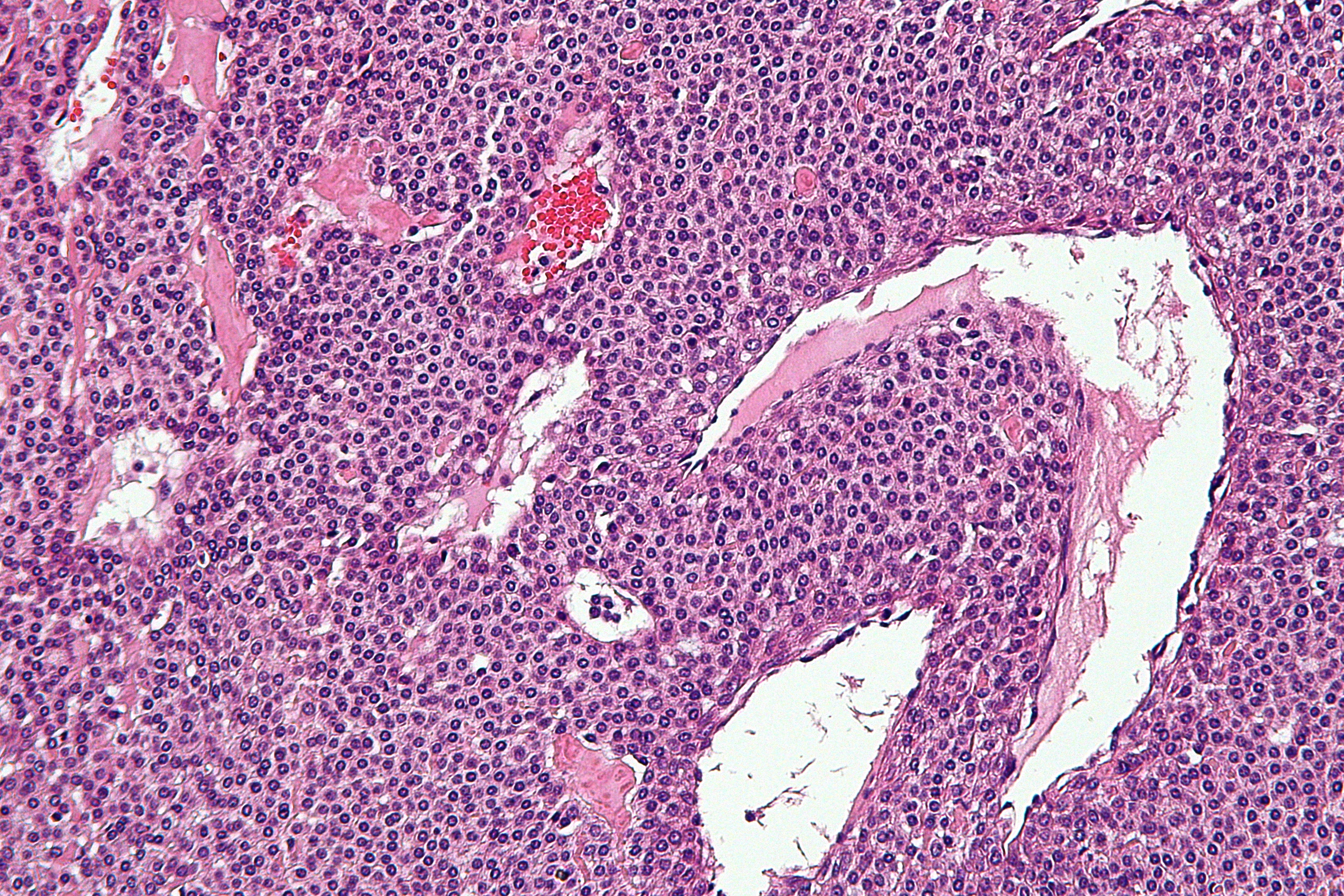
- Micrograph of a glomus tumor. H&E stain.
- Specialty: Oncology

Glomus tumor was also the name formerly (and incorrectly) used for a tumor now called a paraganglioma.

A glomus tumor (also known as a "solitary glomus tumor") is a rare neoplasm arising from the glomus body and mainly found under the nail, on the fingertip or in the foot. They account for less than 2% of all soft tissue tumors. The majority of glomus tumors are benign, but they can also show malignant features. Glomus tumors were first described by Hoyer in 1877 while the first complete clinical description was given by Masson in 1924.

Histologically, glomus tumors are made up of an afferent arteriole, anastomotic vessel, and collecting venule. Glomus tumors are modified smooth muscle cells that control the thermoregulatory function of dermal glomus bodies. As stated above, these lesions should not be confused with paragangliomas, which were formerly also called glomus tumors in now-antiquated clinical usage. Paragangliomas do not arise from glomus cells, but glomus tumors do.

Familial glomangiomas have been associated with a variety of deletions in the GLMN (glomulin) gene, and are inherited in an autosomal dominant manner, with incomplete penetrance.

== Signs and symptoms ==
Glomus tumors are usually solitary and small lesions. The vast majority are found in the hand, wrist, foot, and under the fingernails.

They are often painful, and the pain is reproduced when the lesion is placed in cold water - a history of sensitivity to cold weather is also common. Multiple tumors are less likely to be painful.

These tumors tend to have a bluish discoloration, although a whitish appearance may also be noted. Elevation of the nail bed can occur.

In rare cases, the tumors may present in other body areas, such as the gastric antrum or glans penis. Treatment is essentially the same.

Malignant glomus tumors, or glomangiosarcomas, are extremely rare and usually represent a locally infiltrative malignancy. However, metastases do occur and are usually fatal.

== Diagnosis ==
By histopathology, glomus tumors can be termed as follows:

- Solid glomus tumor (75% of cases): Consisting predominantly of glomus cells, with poor vasculature and rare smooth muscle cells.
- Glomangioma (20% of cases): Tumors with a prominent vascular component.
- Glomangiomyoma (5% of cases): Tumors with prominent vascular and smooth muscle components.

Cancerous glomus tumors are exceedingly rare. Criteria for the diagnosis of malignancy in glomus tumors are:

1. Tumor size of more than 2 centimeters and subfascial or visceral location.
2. Atypical mitotic figures.
3. Marked nuclear atypia and any level of mitotic activity.
  - Pericytes of Zimmerman

Cancerous glomus tumors have been subdivided into three categories based on their histologic appearance: locally infiltrative glomus tumors (LIGT), glomangiosarcomas arising in benign glomus tumors (GABG), and glomangiosarcomas arising de novo (GADN).

A few cases of cancerous glomus tumors have been reported; however, they are usually only locally invasive, and metastases are exceedingly rare. There is one report of widespread metastases of a malignant glomus tumor involving the skin, lungs, jejunum, liver, spleen, and lymph nodes. Another report of a malignant glomus tumor (glomangiosarcoma) with metastases from the skin. A malignant glomus tumor one arose from the kidneys.

=== Differential ===
The probable misdiagnosis of many of these lesions as hemangiomas or venous malformations also makes an accurate assessment of incidence difficult.

== Treatment ==
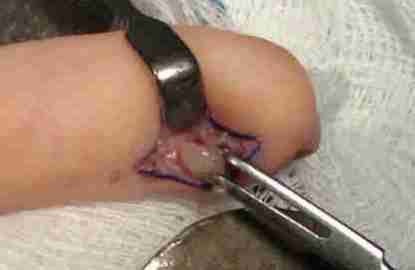
Surgical extraction of a glomus tumor from a fingertip. The tumor is the translucent oblate spheroid in the center of the incision, approximate horizontal dimension is 4 millimeters.

Surgical excision is the preferred treatment for benign glomus tumors.

== Epidemiology ==
The exact rate of glomus tumors is unknown. The multiple variant is rare, accounting for less than 10% of all cases.

=== Sex ===
Solitary glomus tumors, particularly subungual lesions, are more common in females than in males. Multiple lesions are slightly more common in males.

=== Age ===
Solitary glomus tumors are more frequent in adults than in others. Multiple glomus tumors develop 11–15 years earlier than single lesions; about one third of the cases of multiple tumors occur in those younger than 20 years. Congenital glomus tumors are rare; they are plaguelike in appearance and are considered a variant of multiple glomus tumors.

== See also ==
- Coccygeal glomus
- List of cutaneous conditions
- Myopericytoma
