= Colneleate synthase =

Enzyme

Identifiers
- EC no.: 4.2.1.121

Databases
- IntEnz: IntEnz view
- BRENDA: BRENDA entry
- ExPASy: NiceZyme view
- KEGG: KEGG entry
- MetaCyc: metabolic pathway
- PRIAM: profile
- PDB structures: RCSB PDB PDBe PDBsum
Search
- PMC: articles
- PubMed: articles
- NCBI: proteins

Colneleate synthase (EC 4.2.1.121, 9-divinyl ether synthase, 9-DES, CYP74D, CYP74D1, CYP74 cytochrome P-450, DES1) is an enzyme with systematic name (8E)-9-((1E,3E)-nona-1,3-dien-1-yloxy)non-8-enoate synthase. This enzyme catalyses the following chemical reaction

(9S,10E,12Z)-9-hydroperoxyoctadeca-10,12-dienoate $\rightleftharpoons$

(8E)-9-[(1E,3Z)-nona-1,3-dien-1-yloxy]non-8-enoate + H_{2}O

This enzyme is a heme-thiolate protein (P450).
