= FKBP1A =

Protein and coding gene in humans

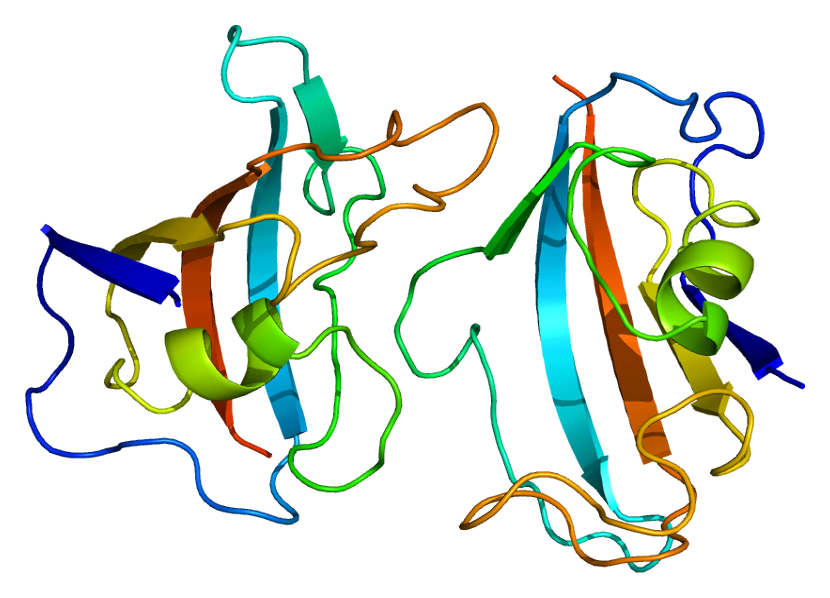

Identifiers
- Aliases: FKBP1A, FKBP-12, FKBP-1A, FKBP1, FKBP12, PKC12, PKCI2, PPIASE, FK506 binding protein 1A, FKBP prolyl isomerase 1A
- External IDs: OMIM: 186945; MGI: 95541; GeneCards: FKBP1A
Available structures
PDB	Ortholog search: PDBe RCSB
PDB	List of PDB id codes 1A7X, 1B6C, 1BKF, 1BL4, 1D6O, 1D7H, 1D7I, 1D7J, 1EYM, 1F40, 1FAP, 1FKB, 1FKD, 1FKF, 1FKG, 1FKH, 1FKI, 1FKJ, 1FKR, 1FKS, 1FKT, 1J4H, 1J4I, 1J4R, 1NSG, 1QPF, 1QPL, 2DG3, 2DG4, 2DG9, 2FAP, 2FKE, 2PPN, 2PPO, 2PPP, 2RSE, 3FAP, 3H9R, 3MDY, 4DH0, 4FAP, 4IPX, 4N19, 4ODP, 4ODQ, 4ODR
Enzyme activity
EC #	BRENDA	ExPASy	KEGG	MetaCyc
5.2.1.8	↗	↗	↗	↗

Gene location (Human)
Chr.	Chromosome 20 (human)
Band	20p13	Start	1,368,977 bp
Band	20p13	End	1,393,164 bp

Gene location (Mouse)
Chr.	Chromosome 2 (mouse)
Band	2|2 G3	Start	151,384,403 bp
Band	2|2 G3	End	151,403,612 bp
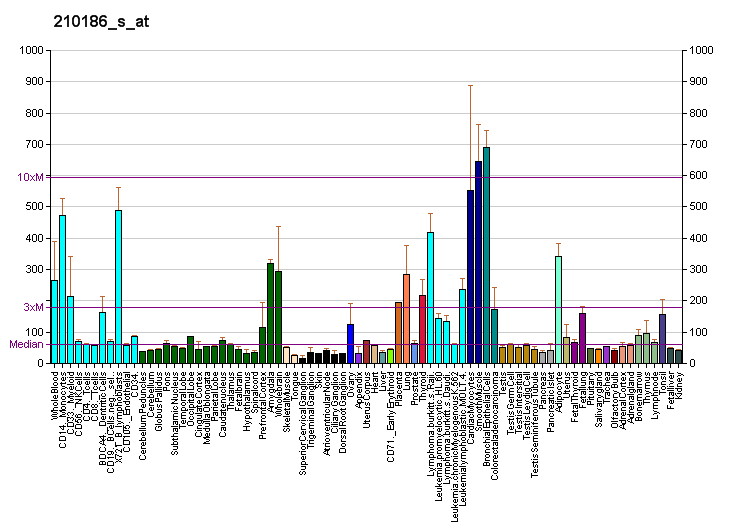

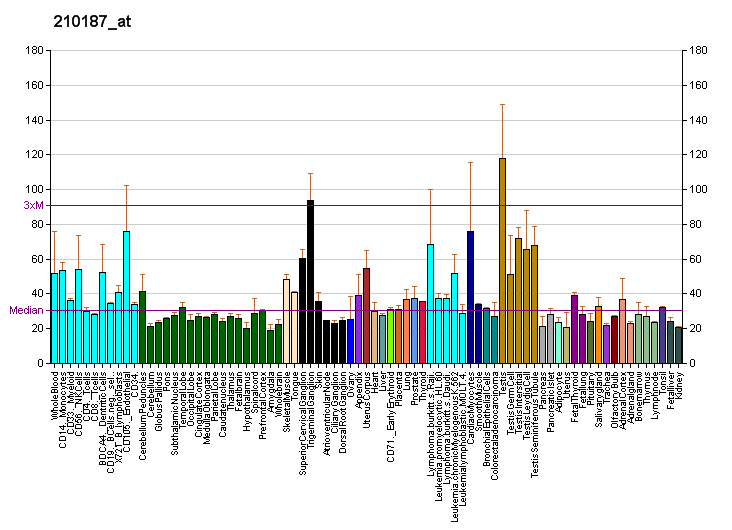

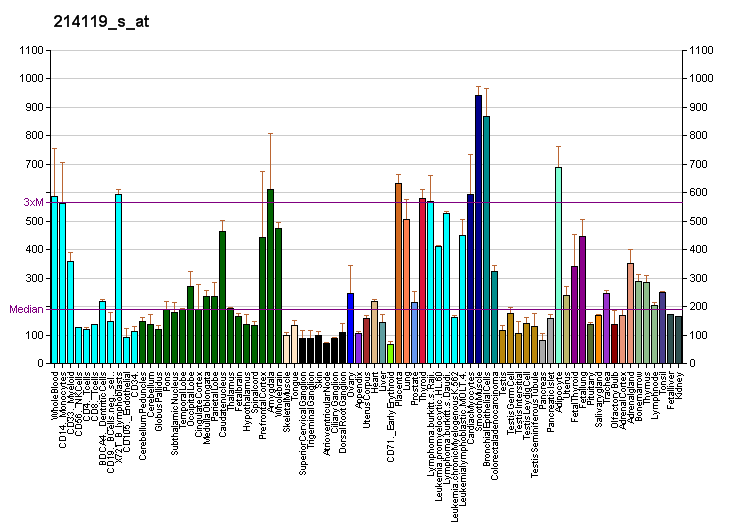
RNA expression pattern
Bgee	Human / Mouse (ortholog); Top expressed in: right lung; monocyte; upper lobe of left lung; right lobe of thyroid gland; left lobe of thyroid gland; nucleus accumbens; epithelium of colon; rectum; left uterine tube; smooth muscle tissue / Top expressed in: lateral septal nucleus; olfactory tubercle; external carotid artery; internal carotid artery; dentate gyrus of hippocampal formation granule cell; subiculum; nucleus accumbens; anterior amygdaloid area; endocardial cushion; Gonadal ridge; More reference expression data
BioGPS	More reference expression data
Gene ontology
Molecular function	calcium channel inhibitor activity; activin binding; isomerase activity; macrolide binding; peptidyl-prolyl cis-trans isomerase activity; signal transducer activity; protein binding; SMAD binding; transforming growth factor beta receptor binding; FK506 binding; enzyme binding; Hsp70 protein binding; type I transforming growth factor beta receptor binding; protein homodimerization activity; transmembrane transporter binding
Cellular component	cytoplasm; terminal cisterna; Z discdkac; extracellular exosome; extrinsic component of organelle membrane; cytoplasmic side of membrane; ryanodine receptor complex; cytosol; membrane; sarcoplasmic reticulum; sarcoplasmic reticulum membrane; intracellular membrane-bounded organelle; axon terminus
Biological process	SMAD protein complex assembly; amyloid fibril formation; regulation of activin receptor signaling pathway; protein maturation by protein folding; regulation of amyloid precursor protein catabolic process; protein peptidyl-prolyl isomerization; negative regulation of ryanodine-sensitive calcium-release channel activity; regulation of protein localization; calcium ion transmembrane transport; protein refolding; regulation of immune response; positive regulation of I-kappaB kinase/NF-kappaB signaling; negative regulation of release of sequestered calcium ion into cytosol; positive regulation of protein binding; positive regulation of protein ubiquitination; 'de novo' protein folding; transforming growth factor beta receptor signaling pathway; T cell activation; chaperone-mediated protein folding; supramolecular fiber organization; negative regulation of phosphoprotein phosphatase activity; protein folding; negative regulation of protein phosphorylation; heart morphogenesis; muscle contraction; response to iron ion; cytokine-mediated signaling pathway; response to caffeine; T cell proliferation; release of sequestered calcium ion into cytosol; ventricular cardiac muscle tissue morphogenesis; regulation of ryanodine-sensitive calcium-release channel activity; heart trabecula formation
Sources:Amigo / QuickGO
Orthologs
Databases	NCBI: entry; OMA: entry
Species	Human	Mouse
Entrez	2280	14225
Ensembl	ENSG00000088832	ENSMUSG00000032966
UniProt	P62942	P26883
RefSeq (mRNA)	NM_054014; NM_000801; NM_001199786	NM_001302077; NM_001302078; NM_001302079; NM_001302080; NM_008019 NM_001355077; NM_001355078
RefSeq (protein)	NP_000792; NP_001186715; NP_463460	NP_001289006; NP_001289007; NP_001289008; NP_001289009; NP_032045 NP_001342006; NP_001342007
Location (UCSC)	Chr 20: 1.37 – 1.39 Mb	Chr 2: 151.38 – 151.4 Mb
PubMed search
- Wikidata
View/Edit Human	View/Edit Mouse

Peptidyl-prolyl cis-trans isomerase FKBP1A is an enzyme that in humans is encoded by the FKBP1A gene. It is also commonly referred to as FKBP-12 or FKBP12 and is a member of a family of FK506-binding proteins (FKBPs).

== Function ==
The protein encoded by this gene is a member of the immunophilin protein family, which play a role in immunoregulation and basic cellular processes involving protein folding and trafficking. This encoded protein is a cis-trans prolyl isomerase that binds the immunosuppressants FK506 (tacrolimus) and rapamycin (sirolimus). It interacts with several intracellular signal transduction proteins including type I TGF-beta receptor. It also interacts with multiple intracellular calcium release channels including the tetrameric skeletal muscle ryanodine receptor. In mouse, deletion of this homologous gene causes congenital heart disorder known as noncompaction of left ventricular myocardium. Multiple alternatively spliced variants, encoding the same protein, have been identified. The human genome contains five pseudogenes related to this gene, at least one of which is transcribed.

== Interactions ==
FKBP1A has been shown to interact with:

- GLMN,
- ITPR1
- KIAA1303,
- Mammalian target of rapamycin,
- RYR1, and
- TGF beta receptor 1.
