= TMP-HTag =

Small molecule chemical linker

Chemical structure of the TMP-HTag linker

Trimethoprim-Halotag (TMP-HTag) is a small molecule chemical linker developed for the rapid and reversible control of protein localization in living cells (Ballister). TMP is an dihydrofolate reductase (DHFR) inhibitor chosen for its specificity in binding to the bacterial form of DHFR. The other half of the linker is a Halotag, a self labelling bacterial globular protein ligand that can bind covalently and irreversibly to the chloroalkane group of a Haloenzyme. Positioned between the TMP group and HaloTag is a flexible linker that can be modified to optimize protein linking efficiency. The modular structure of TMP-HaloTag makes it an ideal heterobifunctional tool for use in chemically induced dimerization (CID). Additionally, TMP- HTag can be modified to include photo-cleavable groups that allow for the control of CID using light.

== TMP-HTag Examples ==
Abbr	Full name
TH	Trimethoprim-Halotag
CTH	7-(diethylamino)-coumarin-4-yl] methyl (DEACM)-TMP-Halo
TNH	TMP-6- nitroveratryl carbamate (NVOC-HTag
TBH	TMP- Benzamide-HTag
TFH	TMP-Fluorobenzamide-HTag

Abbr	Structural Functionality	Ref
TH	Linker length optimizable for efficient dimerization	
CTH	DEACAM group on TMP end for photo cleavability that prevents off-target dimerization	
TNH	NVOC group between TMP and HTag for photo cleavability. Requires light activation and use may result in photo toxicity. Light sensitive so must be stored and applied in controlled light. Slightly faster synthesis process than other dimerizer syntheses	
TBH	Additional aromatic rings for rigidity that improves permeability and stability of heterodimer protein complexes that form with dimerization. Not light sensitive but slower. Lengthier synthesis but simpler process than TNH	
TFH	Aromatic fluorines lend lipophilicity and possibly "stickiness" that facilitates faster dimerization than with TBH. Minimizes photo-toxicity since light is not required.	

== TMP-HTag Applications ==
Example Applications	References
Mitotic studies	
Alternative lengthening of telomeres (ALT) cancer study	
CRISPR based tool development	
Protein localization manipulation	
