= Glomus body =

Blood vessel connection in the skin which helps regulate body heat

A glomus body (or glomus organ; plural glomera) is a component of the dermis layer of the skin, involved in body temperature regulation. The glomus body is a small arteriovenous anastomosis surrounded by a capsule of connective tissue. Glomera are most numerous in the fingers and toes. The role of the glomus body is to shunt blood away from the skin surface when exposed to cold temperatures, thus preventing heat loss, and allowing maximum blood flow to the skin in warm weather to allow heat to dissipate. The glomus body has high sympathetic tone and potentiation leads to near complete vasoconstriction.

Endothelial cells form a single, continuous layer that lines all vascular segments. Junctional complexes keep the endothelial cells together in arteries but are less numerous in veins. The organization of the endothelial cell layer in capillaries can vary greatly, depending on the location. The arteriovenous shunt of the glomus body is a normal anatomic shunt as opposed to an abnormal arteriovenous fistula. A metarteriole is another type.

== See also ==
- Glomus tumor
