= FKBP5 =

Protein-coding gene in humans

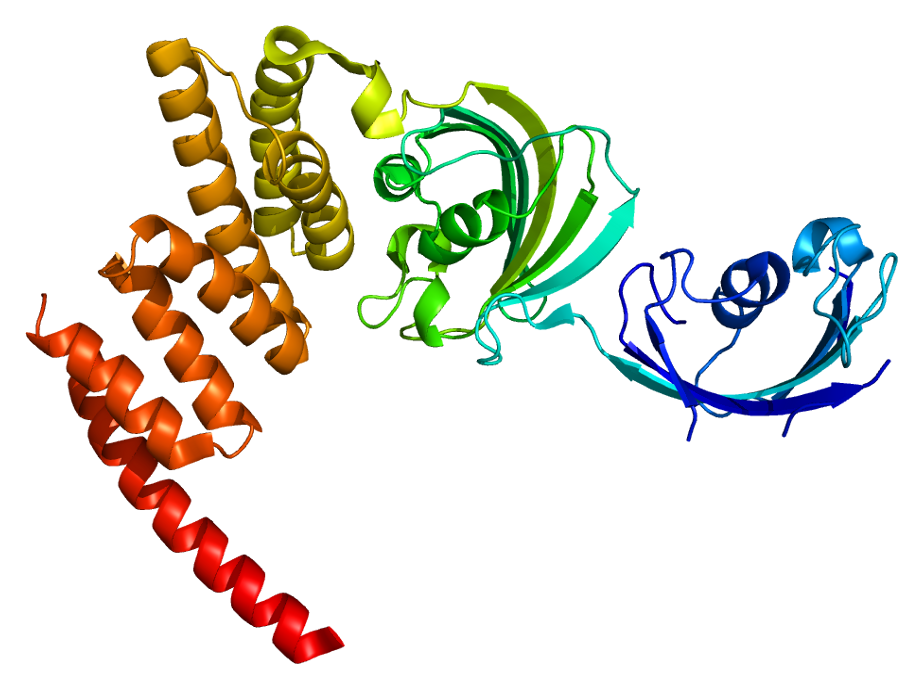

Identifiers
- Aliases: FKBP5, AIG6, FKBP51, FKBP54, P54, PPIase, Ptg-10, FK506 binding protein 5, FKBP prolyl isomerase 5
- External IDs: OMIM: 602623; MGI: 104670; GeneCards: FKBP5
Available structures
PDB	Ortholog search: PDBe RCSB
PDB	List of PDB id codes 1KT0, 3O5D, 3O5E, 3O5F, 3O5G, 3O5I, 3O5J, 3O5K, 3O5L, 3O5M, 3O5O, 3O5P, 3O5Q, 3O5R, 4DRH, 4DRI, 4DRK, 4DRM, 4DRN, 4DRO, 4DRP, 4DRQ, 4JFI, 4JFJ, 4JFK, 4JFL, 4JFM, 4R0X, 4TW6, 4TW7, 4TX0, 4W9O, 4W9P, 4W9Q, 5DIT, 5DIU, 5BXJ, 5DIV
Enzyme activity
EC #	BRENDA	ExPASy	KEGG	MetaCyc
5.2.1.8	↗	↗	↗	↗

Gene location (Human)
Chr.	Chromosome 6 (human)
Band	6p21.31	Start	35,573,585 bp
Band	6p21.31	End	35,728,583 bp

Gene location (Mouse)
Chr.	Chromosome 17 (mouse)
Band	17 A3.3|17 14.66 cM	Start	28,618,068 bp
Band	17 A3.3|17 14.66 cM	End	28,736,501 bp
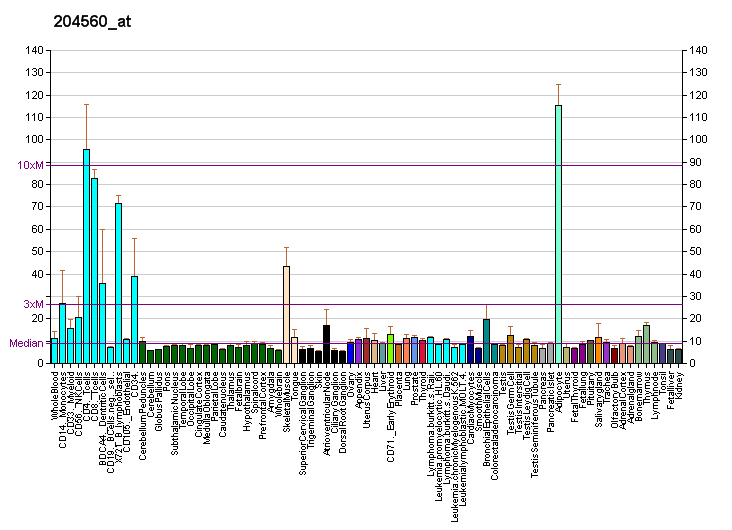
RNA expression pattern
Bgee	Human / Mouse (ortholog); Top expressed in: gastric mucosa; pericardium; Skeletal muscle tissue of biceps brachii; right lung; skin of hip; skin of thigh; gastrocnemius muscle; left uterine tube; corpus epididymis; synovial joint / Top expressed in: stroma of bone marrow; lacrimal gland; muscle of thigh; secondary oocyte; thymus; gastrula; zygote; primary oocyte; Gonadal ridge; seminal vesicula; More reference expression data
BioGPS	More reference expression data
Gene ontology
Molecular function	isomerase activity; protein binding; heat shock protein binding; peptidyl-prolyl cis-trans isomerase activity; FK506 binding
Cellular component	extracellular exosome; membrane; nucleus; nucleoplasm; cytoplasm; cytosol
Biological process	protein peptidyl-prolyl isomerization; chaperone-mediated protein folding; protein folding; response to bacterium
Sources:Amigo / QuickGO
Orthologs
Databases	NCBI: entry; OMA: entry
Species	Human	Mouse
Entrez	2289	14229
Ensembl	ENSG00000096060	ENSMUSG00000024222
UniProt	Q13451	Q64378
RefSeq (mRNA)	NM_004117; NM_001145775; NM_001145776; NM_001145777	NM_010220
RefSeq (protein)	NP_001139247; NP_001139248; NP_001139249; NP_004108	NP_034350
Location (UCSC)	Chr 6: 35.57 – 35.73 Mb	Chr 17: 28.62 – 28.74 Mb
PubMed search
- Wikidata
View/Edit Human	View/Edit Mouse

FK506 binding protein 5, also known as FKBP5, is a protein which in humans is encoded by the FKBP5 gene.

== Function ==
The protein encoded by this gene is a member of the immunophilin protein family, which play a role in immunoregulation and basic cellular processes involving protein folding and trafficking. This encoded protein is a cis-trans prolyl isomerase that binds to the immunosuppressants tacrolimus (FK506) and sirolimus (rapamycin). It is thought to mediate calcineurin inhibition. It also interacts functionally with mature corticoid receptor hetero-complexes (i.e. progesterone-, glucocorticoid-, mineralocorticoid-receptor complexes) along with the 90 kDa heat shock protein and PTGES3 (P23 protein).

As an Hsp90-associated co-chaperone that regulates the responsiveness of steroid hormone receptors, FKBP51 plays an important role in stress endocrinology and glucocorticoid signaling.

== Structure ==
FKBP5 is part of the FKBP protein family and contains several functional domains. It includes an FKBP-type peptidyl-prolyl cis-trans isomerase (PPIase) domain (FK1), an FKBP-like domain (FK2), and a C-terminal region with three tetratricopeptide repeat (TPR) motifs. The FK1 domain has PPIase activity, facilitating protein folding. In contrast, the FK2 domain, while structurally similar to FK1, lacks measurable PPIase activity. Instead, it is thought to play a role in protein-protein interactions, particularly in binding to progesterone receptor, suggesting a scaffolding function. The TPR motifs in the C-terminal region resemble those found in Hsp90 and contribute to molecular interactions.

== Clinical significance ==
The FKBP5 gene has been found to have multiple polyadenylation sites and is statistically associated with a higher rate of depressive disorders.

Decreased methylation in the promoter of the FKBP5 gene has been observed in blood samples from patients with neurodegenerative diseases.

== FKBP51 Ligands ==
As a key player in several diseases like stress-related disorders, chronic pain, and obesity, FKBP51 is an attractive drug target. SAFit2 currently the most best characterized FKBP51 ligand, has shown promising effects in numerous animal models. Macrocyclic FKBP51-selective ligands are non-immunosuppressive, engage FKBP51 in cells, and block the cellular effect of FKBP51.

== Interactions ==
FKBP5 has been shown to interact with Heat shock protein 90kDa alpha (cytosolic), member A1.

=== Steroid hormone regulation ===
FKBP5 interacts with three key steroid hormone receptors: the glucocorticoid receptor (GR), progesterone receptor (PR), and androgen receptor (AR). These receptors regulate gene transcription, including FKBP5 expression. Interestingly, FKBP5 inhibits GR and PR activation, creating a negative feedback loop that limits their activity. In contrast, FKBP5 enhances AR signaling, leading to a positive regulatory effect.

=== AKT phosphorylation ===
FKBP5 regulates AKT activity by helping AKT interact with PHLPP, which dephosphorylates AKT at Ser473. FKBP5 binds to AKT through its FK1 domain and to PHLPP through its TPR domain, supporting their interaction. Without FKBP51, the interaction between AKT and PHLPP is reduced, leading to higher AKT phosphorylation at Ser473 and increased AKT activity.

== See also ==
- FKBP4 - a functional antagonist to FKBP5 at corticoid receptors
- FKBP3 - a DNA binding FKBP
