= Glomectomy =

Surgical procedure

- ICD-9-CM: 39.8

A glomectomy is the surgical removal of a carotid body. This operation was formerly performed for the treatment of severe, chronic asthma, but has since been abandoned for this purpose due to its lack of efficacy.
