= Parvulin =

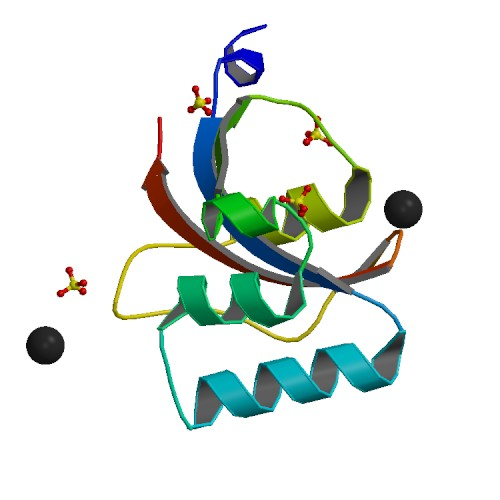
crystal structure of human Parvulin 14. PDB 3UI4, 3UI5, 3UI6

Parvulin, a 92-amino acid protein discovered in E. coli in 1994, is the smallest known protein with prolyl isomerase activity, which catalyzes the cis-trans isomerization of proline peptide bonds. Although parvulin has no homology with larger prolyl isomerases such as cyclophilin and FKBP, it does share structural features with subdomains of other proteins involved in preparing secreted proteins for export from the cell.

Although parvulin is as active as the larger prolyl isomerases against a short proline-containing test peptide, it has lower relative activity against biological substrates, possibly because the larger molecules have a higher ability to bind the substrate peptide. Parvulin itself contains proline residues and its folding can be accelerated by the presence of cyclophilin; parvulin folding can also be autocatalytic.

A eukaryotic homolog of parvulin known as Pin1 is required to execute the transition from G2 phase to M phase in the cell cycle. Absence of Pin1 activity in humans has also been implicated in the folding and processing of the amyloid precursor protein, whose degradation product is the cytotoxic peptide amyloid beta implicated in Alzheimer's disease.

In addition to Pin1, higher eukaryotes contain an additional parvulin gene, whose core sequence is highly conserved in all multi-cellular organisms examined so far, but absent from yeast. In humans the locus of this parvulin resides on chromosome Xq13 and encodes two protein species, Par14 and Par17. Par17, which is exclusively expressed in hominids and humans, is an N-terminal extended version of Par14 and results from alternative transcription initiation.
