= FKBP3 =

Protein-coding gene in the species Homo sapiens

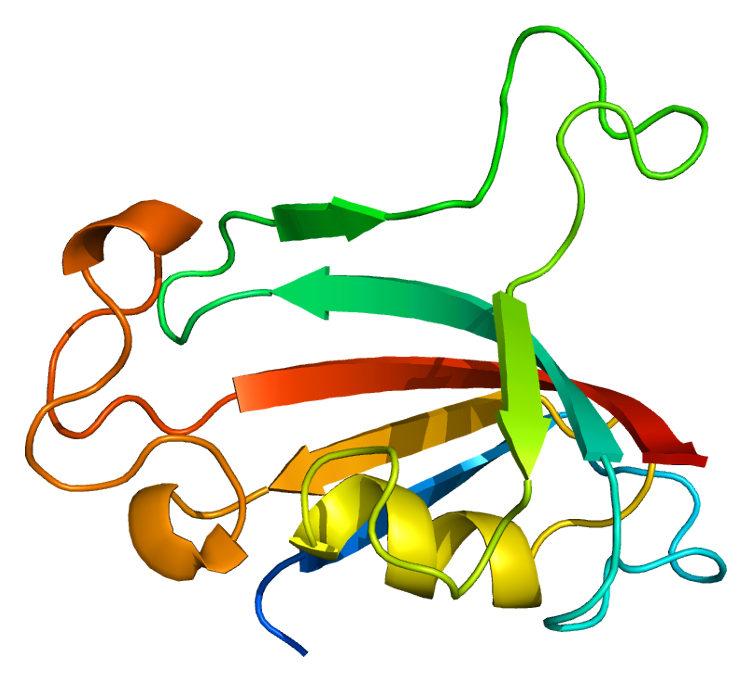

Identifiers
- Aliases: FKBP3, FKBP-25, FKBP-3, FKBP25, PPIase, FK506 binding protein 3, FKBP prolyl isomerase 3
- External IDs: OMIM: 186947; MGI: 1353460; GeneCards: FKBP3
Available structures
PDB	Ortholog search: PDBe RCSB
PDB	List of PDB id codes 1PBK, 2KFV, 2MPH, 5D75
Enzyme activity
EC #	BRENDA	ExPASy	KEGG	MetaCyc
5.2.1.8	↗	↗	↗	↗

Gene location (Human)
Chr.	Chromosome 14 (human)
Band	14q21.2	Start	45,115,599 bp
Band	14q21.2	End	45,135,319 bp

Gene location (Mouse)
Chr.	Chromosome 12 (mouse)
Band	12|12 C1	Start	65,109,198 bp
Band	12|12 C1	End	65,120,781 bp
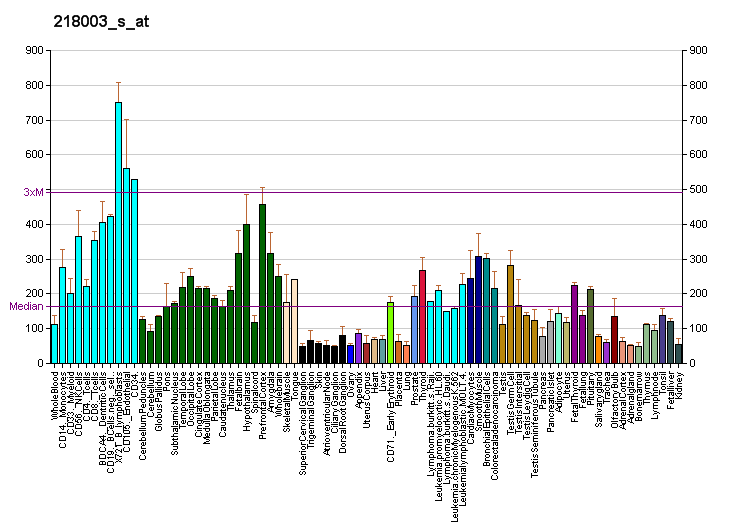
RNA expression pattern
Bgee	Human / Mouse (ortholog); Top expressed in: Skeletal muscle tissue of biceps brachii; vastus lateralis muscle; Skeletal muscle tissue of rectus abdominis; Brodmann area 23; body of tongue; muscle of thigh; gastrocnemius muscle; sperm; thoracic diaphragm; right ventricle / Top expressed in: medial vestibular nucleus; mammillary body; lateral hypothalamus; intercostal muscle; ventromedial nucleus; tail of embryo; deep cerebellar nuclei; lateral septal nucleus; dorsomedial hypothalamic nucleus; paraventricular nucleus of hypothalamus; More reference expression data
BioGPS	More reference expression data
Gene ontology
Molecular function	isomerase activity; FK506 binding; peptidyl-prolyl cis-trans isomerase activity; protein binding; RNA binding; signaling receptor activity
Cellular component	nucleus; cytoplasm
Biological process	chaperone-mediated protein folding; protein peptidyl-prolyl isomerization
Sources:Amigo / QuickGO
Orthologs
Databases	NCBI: entry; OMA: entry
Species	Human	Mouse
Entrez	2287	30795
Ensembl	ENSG00000100442	ENSMUSG00000020949
UniProt	Q00688	Q62446
RefSeq (mRNA)	NM_002013	NM_013902
RefSeq (protein)	NP_002004	NP_038930
Location (UCSC)	Chr 14: 45.12 – 45.14 Mb	Chr 12: 65.11 – 65.12 Mb
PubMed search
- Wikidata
View/Edit Human	View/Edit Mouse

FK506-binding protein 3 also known as FKBP25 is a protein that in humans is encoded by the FKBP3 gene.

== Function ==
The protein encoded by this gene is a member of the immunophilin protein family, which play a role in immunoregulation and basic cellular processes involving protein folding and trafficking. This encoded protein is a cis-trans prolyl isomerase that binds the immunosuppressants FK506 and rapamycin. It has a higher affinity for rapamycin than for FK506 and thus may be an important target molecule for immunosuppression by rapamycin.

== Interactions ==
FKBP3 has been shown to interact with YY1, HDAC1, Histone deacetylase 2, DNA, and Mdm2. Both crystal structure of FKBP25 with FK506 and the NMR structure of full length FKBP25 has been published with PDB ID 5D75 and 2MPH respectively.
