= Immunophilins =

Class of enzymes

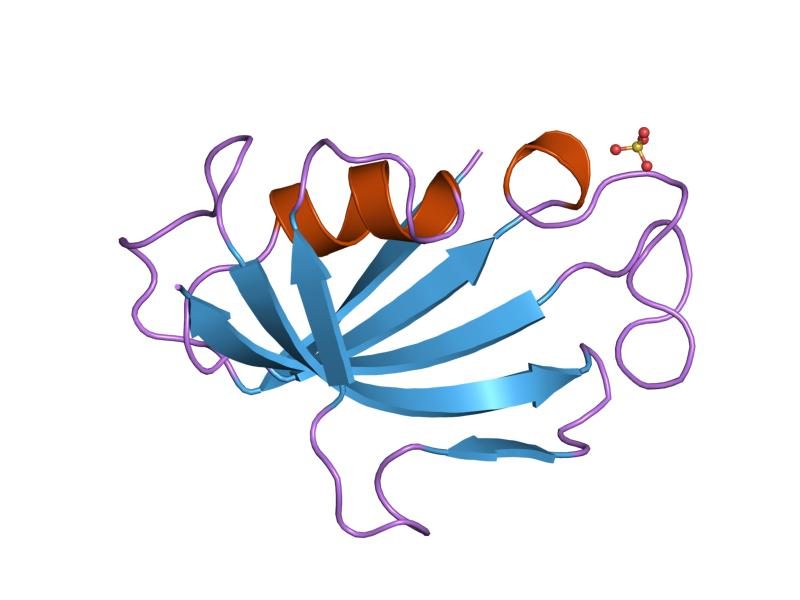
FKBP12, a human immunophilin. It is the target protein of tacrolimus, an immunosuppressant drug.

A plant immunophilin (Arabidopsis thaliana ROF1) expressed in a tobacco plant cell. The protein glows green as it is bound to a green fluorescent protein. In the video, the cell is exposed to salt water causing the cytoplasm to shrink and pull away from the cell wall (plasmolysis).

In molecular biology, immunophilins are a group of endogenous cytosolic peptidyl-prolyl isomerases (PPI), which catalyze the interconversion between the cis and trans isomers of peptide bonds containing the amino acid proline (Pro). They are chaperone molecules that generally assist in the proper folding of diverse "client" proteins. There are two families of immunophilins that are structurally unrelated, but have similar biochemical activity: cyclosporin-binding cyclophilins (CyPs) and FK506-binding proteins (FKBPs). In 2005, a group of dual-family immunophilins (DFI) has been discovered, mostly in unicellular organisms; these DFIs are natural chimera of CyP and FKBPs, fused in either order (CyP-FKBP or FKBP-CyP). Immunophilins are named as such because they were originally discovered in the context of immunosuppressive drugs; however both families of prolyl isomerases are ubiquitous across taxa and have diverse functions.

== In medicine ==
In medicine, immunophilins act as receptors for immunosuppressive drugs such as sirolimus (rapamycin), cyclosporin (such as CsA) and tacrolimus (FK506), which inhibit the prolyl isomerase activity of the immunophilins. The drug-immunophilin complexes (CsA-CyP and FK506-FKBP) bind to calcineurin, which inhibits the phosphatase activity of calcineurin and engenders the immunosuppressive effects. CsA and FK506 thus affect the calcium-dependent step of T cell response which prevents release of interleukin-2. Immunophilins also form protein complex with ryanodine and inositol triphosphate (IP3) which impacts the release of calcium.

FK506 binds with high affinity to other smaller proteins, such as FKBP-12. FKBP-12 and cyclophilins both share common peptide-prolyl isomerase activity. While the majority of the Peptide bonds within proteins exist in trans (planar) conformation because of the partial double-bond nature of the peptide bond, a small fraction occurs in cis. Unlike regular peptide bonds, the X-Pro peptide bond does not adopt the intended trans conformation spontaneously, thus, cis-trans isomerization can be the rate-limiting (slowest) step in the process of protein folding. Immunophilins, with their prolyl isomerase activity, thus function as protein-folding chaperones.

== See also ==
- FKBP12
- FKBP 3 (FKBP25)
- FKBP4 (FKBP52)
- FKBP5 (FKBP51)
