= NFATC =

NFATC may refer to:

- National Foreign Affairs Training Center
- Members of the nuclear factor of activated T-cells family, including NFATC1, NFATC2, NFATC3, and NFATC4
