= Calcineurin =

Class of enzymes

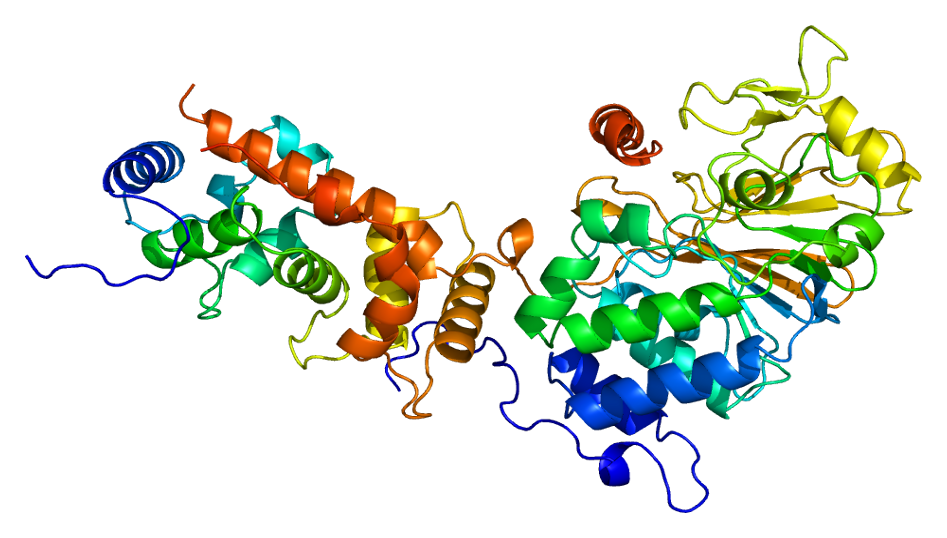
Crystallographic structure of calcineurin heterodimer composed of the catalytic (PPP3CA) and regulatory (PPP3R1) subunits.

Calcineurin (CaN) is a calcium and calmodulin dependent serine/threonine protein phosphatase (also known as protein phosphatase 3, and calcium-dependent serine-threonine phosphatase). It activates the T cells of the immune system and can be blocked by drugs. Calcineurin activates nuclear factor of activated T cell cytoplasmic (NFATc), a transcription factor, by dephosphorylating it. The activated NFATc is then translocated into the nucleus, where it upregulates the expression of interleukin 2 (IL-2), which, in turn, stimulates the growth and differentiation of the T cell response. Calcineurin is the target of a class of drugs called calcineurin inhibitors, which include ciclosporin, voclosporin, pimecrolimus and tacrolimus.

Calcineurin is a highly conserved protein within eukaryotic life, appearing within organisms from yeasts to mammals.

== Structure ==
Calcineurin is a heterodimer of a 61-kD calmodulin-binding catalytic subunit, calcineurin A and a 19-kD Ca^{2+}-binding regulatory subunit, calcineurin B. In humans, there are three isozymes of the catalytic subunit, each encoded by a separate gene (PPP3CA, PPP3CB, and PPP3CC) and two isoforms of the regulatory, also encoded by separate genes (PPP3R1, PPP3R2).

protein phosphatase 3, catalytic subunit, alpha isozyme

Identifiers
- Symbol: PPP3CA
- Alt. symbols: CALN, CALNA
- NCBI gene: 5530
- HGNC: 9314
- OMIM: 114105
- RefSeq: NM_000944
- UniProt: Q08209

Other data
- EC number: 3.1.3.16
- Locus: Chr. 4 q24
Search for
- Structures: Swiss-model
- Domains: InterPro

protein phosphatase 3, catalytic subunit, beta isozyme

Identifiers
- Symbol: PPP3CB
- Alt. symbols: CALNB
- NCBI gene: 5532
- HGNC: 9315
- OMIM: 114106
- RefSeq: NM_021132
- UniProt: P16298

Other data
- EC number: 3.1.3.16
- Locus: Chr. 10 q22.2
Search for
- Structures: Swiss-model
- Domains: InterPro

protein phosphatase 3, catalytic subunit, gamma isozyme

Identifiers
- Symbol: PPP3CC
- NCBI gene: 5533
- HGNC: 9316
- OMIM: 114107
- RefSeq: NM_005605
- UniProt: P48454

Other data
- EC number: 3.1.3.16
- Locus: Chr. 8 p21.3
Search for
- Structures: Swiss-model
- Domains: InterPro

protein phosphatase 3, regulatory subunit B, alpha

Identifiers
- Symbol: PPP3R1
- NCBI gene: 5534
- HGNC: 9317
- OMIM: 601302
- RefSeq: NM_000945
- UniProt: P63098

Other data
- EC number: 3.1.3.16
- Locus: Chr. 2 p14
Search for
- Structures: Swiss-model
- Domains: InterPro

protein phosphatase 3, regulatory subunit B, beta

Identifiers
- Symbol: PPP3R2
- NCBI gene: 5535
- HGNC: 9318
- OMIM: 613821
- RefSeq: NM_147180
- UniProt: Q96LZ3

Other data
- EC number: 3.1.3.16
- Locus: Chr. 9 q31
Search for
- Structures: Swiss-model
- Domains: InterPro

Calcineurin A contains the active site, which is between 57-9 kDa depending on isoform, with larger catalytic subunits found in lower eukaryotes such as Saccharomyces fungus. This catalytic subunit consists of a catalytic domain homologous to other serine/threonine protein phosphatases as well as three unique regulatory domains at the COOH terminus. These three regulatory domains were found to be the binding domain of the regulatory subunit of calcineurin B, the domain for calmodulin binding, and the autoinhibitory domain. When calmodulin or Ca^{2+} is absent, the autoinhibitory domain binds to the active site, inhibiting activity. Conformational changes with the binding of calmodulin or Ca^{2+} frees the active site and resumes calcineurin function.

== Mechanism of action ==
When an antigen-presenting cell interacts with a T cell receptor on T cells, there is an increase in the cytoplasmic level of calcium, which activates calcineurin by binding a regulatory subunit and activating calmodulin binding. Calcineurin induces transcription factors (NFATs) that are important in the transcription of IL-2 genes. IL-2 activates T-helper lymphocytes and induces the production of other cytokines. In this way, it governs the action of cytotoxic lymphocytes. The amount of IL-2 being produced by the T-helper cells is believed to influence the extent of the immune response significantly.

Calcineurin directly dephosphorylates cytoplasmic subunits of the NFAT1 transcription complex, operating through direct binding through a conserved N terminus. Translocation of the NFAT transcription factors into the nucleus is maintained via the concentration of Ca^{2+} ions due to the integration of Ca^{2+} signaling within mitogen-activated protein kinase in NFAT, the activity of Calmodulin can act as a coincidence detector for Ras signaling pathways. Dissociation of histone deacetylase 4 (HDAC) by calcineurin leads to regulation of the Mef2 transcription factor, which mediates transition of fast muscle fibers to slow muscle fibers. This ability to regulate muscular fiber conversion has implications for the developmental impact of the protein and also is believed to be connected to regulation of programmed cell death.

== Function ==
=== Synaptic connection ===
Calcineurin is suggested to be a critical component in the formation of synaptic connections. NFATc4 is found to be expressed in hippocampal neurons, with translocation via depolarization and normal synaptic activity. This in conjunction with a potential downstream gene encoding a Ca^{2+} channel (IP3R1) form the basis for the potential linkage of calcineurin to synaptic connections, especially within newborn animals which have activation of IP3R1. Should further research support the possible connection between this protein and synapse connection, it would open new directions of study for neurological development in animals.

=== Cardiovascular ===
Heart valve formation and myocardial hypertrophy are also believed to be signaled through the calcineurin signaling pathway. Mutations in the NFATc1 gene are reported to cause failure of development in heart valves, meaning that the calcineurin transcription factor controls a vital developmental pathway for survival of newborn animals. In transgenic mice presenting this mutation are shown to die from congestive heart failure in utero. Stress-induced hypertrophy, a response in cardiac muscle cells, is dependent on calcium, and was discovered to also be induced by overexpression of calcineurin A. Additionally, overexpression of NFATc4 could also induce similar results, and cyclosporin A prevents cardiac hypertrophy development in response to certain stimuli.

Calcineurin is also found to play a critical role in the development of several other structures and functions, such as the liver, skin, inflammatory and immune response. This is shown through the augmentation of suboptimal stimuli through the use of calcium, as well as blocking by cyclosporin A.

=== Cell cycle arrest recovery ===
Mediation of pheromone-induced growth arrest for mating is performed by a Ca^{2+} increase and activation of calcineurin. Strains lacking in either of two yeast calcineurin A subunits were unable to recover from growth arrest. Calmodulin is also found to be required from this growth arrest, meaning that all factors which govern calcineurin activation as well as the protein itself are necessary for proper function of yeast cells. Without the ability to escape growth arrest, yeast cells are unable to exit G1, removing the ability to continue through the cell cycle and engage in asexual reproduction.

=== Sleep ===
Presence and abundance of Calcineurin Aα in mice affects the intensity of non-rapid eye movement sleep (NREMS). In mice which overexpression of the protein subunit occurs, it is observed that the amount of sleep and as a result wakefulness is increased. Furthermore, deficiency or knockout of the subunit leads to diminished NREMS in affected mice, showing the coupling of sleep with the function of the calcineurin protein. Severe insomnia was also exhibited in mice which lacked CnB1, as well as an increased circadian period as compared to wild type mice.

== Clinical relevance ==
=== Rheumatic diseases ===
Calcineurin inhibitors are prescribed for adult rheumatoid arthritis (RA) as a single drug or in combination with methotrexate. The microemulsion formulation is approved by the U.S. Food and Drug Administration for treatment of severely active RA. It is also prescribed for: psoriatic arthritis, psoriasis, acute ocular Behçet's disease, juvenile idiopathic arthritis, adult and juvenile polymyositis and dermatomyositis, adult and juvenile systemic lupus erythematosus, adult lupus membranous nephritis, systemic sclerosis, aplastic anemia, steroid-resistant nephrotic syndrome, atopic dermatitis, severe corticosteroid-dependent asthma, severe ulcerative colitis, pemphigus vulgaris, myasthenia gravis, and dry eye disease, with or without Sjögren's syndrome (administered as ophthalmic emulsion).

=== Schizophrenia ===
Calcineurin is linked to receptors for several brain chemicals including glutamate, dopamine and GABA. An experiment with genetically-altered mice that could not produce calcineurin showed similar symptoms as in humans with schizophrenia: impairment in working memory, attention deficits, aberrant social behavior, and several other abnormalities characteristic of schizophrenia.

=== Diabetes ===
Calcineurin along with NFAT, may improve the function of diabetics' pancreatic beta cells. Thus tacrolimus contributes to the frequent development of new diabetes following renal transplantation.

Calcineurin/NFAT signaling is required for perinatal lung maturation and function.

=== Organ transplantation ===
Calcineurin inhibitors such as tacrolimus and ciclosporin are used to suppress the immune system in organ allotransplant recipients to prevent rejection of the transplanted tissue.

== Interactions ==
Calcineurin has been shown to interact with RCAN1 and AKAP5.

== Viral inhibition ==
Inhibition of calcineurin is also found to be performed by encoded proteins in viruses. Notably, the African swine fever virus encodes the A238L protein, which binds to calcineurin and inhibits translocation and function of NFATc. Given sequence similarity between A238L and NFATc family members suggests that the protein induces cyclosporin-like immunosuppression in host cells.
