= Calcipressin =

Family of proteins

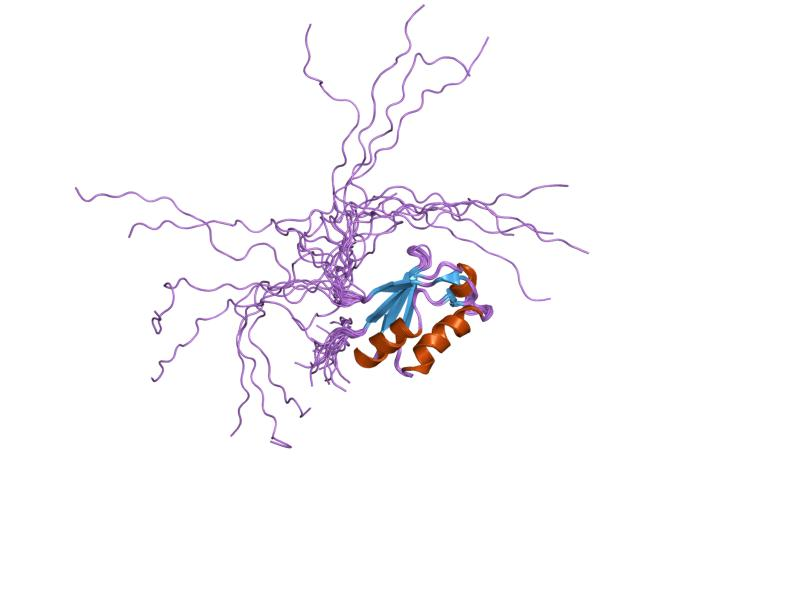
- solution structure of rrm domain in calcipressin 1

Identifiers
- Symbol: Calcipressin
- Pfam: PF04847
- Pfam clan: CL0221
- InterPro: IPR006931
Available protein structures:
- PDB: IPR006931 PF04847 (ECOD; PDBsum)
- AlphaFold: IPR006931; PF04847

In molecular biology, the calcipressin family of proteins negatively regulate calcineurin by direct binding. They are essential for the survival of T helper type 1 cells. Calcipressin 1 is a phosphoprotein that increases its capacity to inhibit calcineurin when phosphorylated at the conserved FLISPP motif; this phosphorylation also controls the half-life of calcipressin 1 by accelerating its degradation.

In humans, the Calcipressins family of proteins is derived from three genes:

- Calcipressin 1 (encoded by RCAN1) is also known as modulatory calcineurin-interacting protein 1 (MCIP1), Adapt78 and Down syndrome critical region 1 (DSCR1).
- Calcipressin 2 (encoded by RCAN2) is variously known as MCIP2, ZAKI-4 and DSCR1-like 1.
- Calcipressin 3 (encoded by RCAN3) is also called MCIP3 and DSCR1-like 2.
