= AKAP5 =

Protein-coding gene in the species Homo sapiens

Available structures
PDB	Ortholog search: PDBe RCSB
PDB	List of PDB id codes 2H9R, 3LL8

Identifiers
- Aliases: AKAP5, AKAP75, AKAP79, H21, A-kinase anchoring protein 5
- External IDs: OMIM: 604688; MGI: 2685104; HomoloGene: 15854; GeneCards: AKAP5; OMA:AKAP5 - orthologs

Gene location (Human)
Chr.	Chromosome 14 (human)
Band	14q23.3	Start	64,465,499 bp
Band	14q23.3	End	64,474,503 bp

Gene location (Mouse)
Chr.	Chromosome 12 (mouse)
Band	12|12 C3	Start	76,371,665 bp
Band	12|12 C3	End	76,380,927 bp
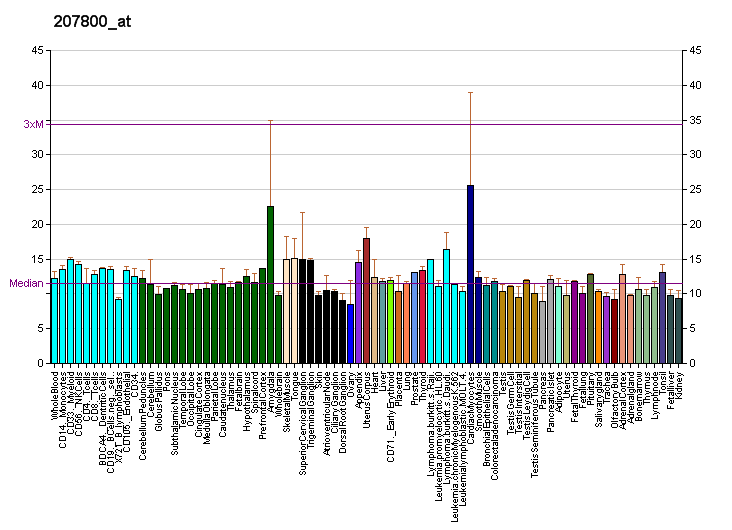
RNA expression pattern
Bgee	Human / Mouse (ortholog); Top expressed in: middle temporal gyrus; Brodmann area 23; entorhinal cortex; superior frontal gyrus; postcentral gyrus; nucleus accumbens; primary visual cortex; endothelial cell; caudate nucleus; prefrontal cortex / Top expressed in: left lung lobe; olfactory tubercle; nucleus accumbens; right lung; right lung lobe; lateral septal nucleus; globus pallidus; temporal lobe; Region I of hippocampus proper; amygdala; More reference expression data
BioGPS	More reference expression data
Gene ontology
Molecular function	protein kinase A binding; calmodulin binding; protein binding; protein kinase A regulatory subunit binding; adenylate cyclase binding; SH3 domain binding; protein phosphatase 2B binding; beta-2 adrenergic receptor binding; molecular adaptor activity; glutamate receptor binding; GABA receptor binding; scaffold protein binding
Cellular component	cytosol; membrane; plasma membrane; cytoplasmic side of plasma membrane; postsynaptic density; dendrite membrane; dendritic spine; membrane raft; excitatory synapse; intracellular anatomical structure
Biological process	protein targeting; signal transduction; positive regulation of protein kinase A signaling; chemical synaptic transmission; adenylate cyclase-inhibiting G protein-coupled receptor signaling pathway; negative regulation of adenylate cyclase activity; regulation of protein kinase A signaling; positive regulation of adenylate cyclase activity; positive regulation of protein localization to plasma membrane
Sources:Amigo / QuickGO
Orthologs
Species	Human	Mouse
Entrez	9495	238276
Ensembl	ENSG00000179841	ENSMUSG00000021057
UniProt	P24588; Q6PG46	D3YVF0
RefSeq (mRNA)	NM_004857	NM_001101471
RefSeq (protein)	NP_004848; NP_004848.3	NP_001094941
Location (UCSC)	Chr 14: 64.47 – 64.47 Mb	Chr 12: 76.37 – 76.38 Mb
PubMed search
- Wikidata
View/Edit Human	View/Edit Mouse

A-kinase anchor protein 5 is a protein that in humans is encoded by the AKAP5 gene.

== Function ==
The A-kinase anchor proteins (AKAPs) are a group of structurally diverse proteins, which have the common function of binding to the regulatory subunit of protein kinase A (PKA) and confining the holoenzyme to discrete locations within the cell. This gene is intronless and encodes a member of the AKAP family. The encoded protein binds to the RII-beta regulatory subunit of PKA, and also to protein kinase C and the phosphatase calcineurin. It is predominantly expressed in cerebral cortex and may anchor the PKA protein at postsynaptic densities (PSD) and be involved in the regulation of postsynaptic events. It is also expressed in T lymphocytes and may function to inhibit interleukin 2 transcription by disrupting calcineurin-dependent dephosphorylation of NFAT.

== Interactions ==
AKAP5 has been shown to interact with:

- Calcineurin and
- GABRB3.
