= Streptomyces tacrolimicus =

Scientific classification
- Domain: Bacteria
- Kingdom: Bacillati
- Phylum: Actinomycetota
- Class: Actinomycetia
- Order: Streptomycetales
- Family: Streptomycetaceae
- Genus: Streptomyces
- Species: S. tacrolimicus

Binomial name
- Streptomyces tacrolimicus Martínez-Castro et al. 2011

Type strain
- ATCC 55098, CECT 7664, CIBE 9021-401, MA 6858

Species of bacterium

Streptomyces tacrolimicus is a bacterium species from the genus of Streptomyces which has been isolated from deer dung. Streptomyces tacrolimicus produces tacrolimus.

== See also ==
- List of Streptomyces species
