= NRON =

ncRNA Repressor of NFAT (nuclear factor of activated T cells)
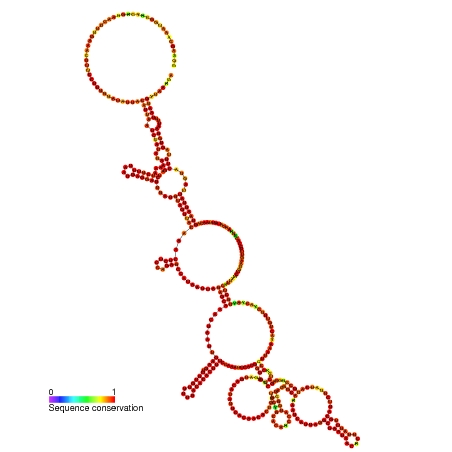
- Predicted secondary structure and sequence conservation of NRON

Identifiers
- Symbol: NRON
- Rfam: RF00636

Other data
- RNA type: Gene
- Domain: Eukaryota
- SO: SO:0001263
- PDB structures: PDBe

NRON also known as ncRNA repressor of the nuclear factor of activated T cells is a non-coding RNA involved in repressing NFAT. The function of this ncRNA was identified by a large-scale screen of 512 non-coding RNAs discovered in earlier EST sequencing projects.

Each of the RNAs that were conserved between human and mouse were knocked down using shRNAs. The resulting cell-lines were screened for changes in activity of NFAT.
