= PPP3CC =

Protein-coding gene in the species Homo sapiens

Identifiers
- Aliases: PPP3CC, CALNA3, CNA3, PP2Bgamma, protein phosphatase 3 catalytic subunit gamma
- External IDs: OMIM: 114107; MGI: 107162; GeneCards: PPP3CC
Enzyme activity
EC #	BRENDA	ExPASy	KEGG	MetaCyc
3.1.3.16	↗	↗	↗	↗

Gene location (Human)
Chr.	Chromosome 8 (human)
Band	8p21.3	Start	22,440,819 bp
Band	8p21.3	End	22,541,142 bp

Gene location (Mouse)
Chr.	Chromosome 14 (mouse)
Band	14|14 D2	Start	70,217,865 bp
Band	14|14 D2	End	70,289,471 bp
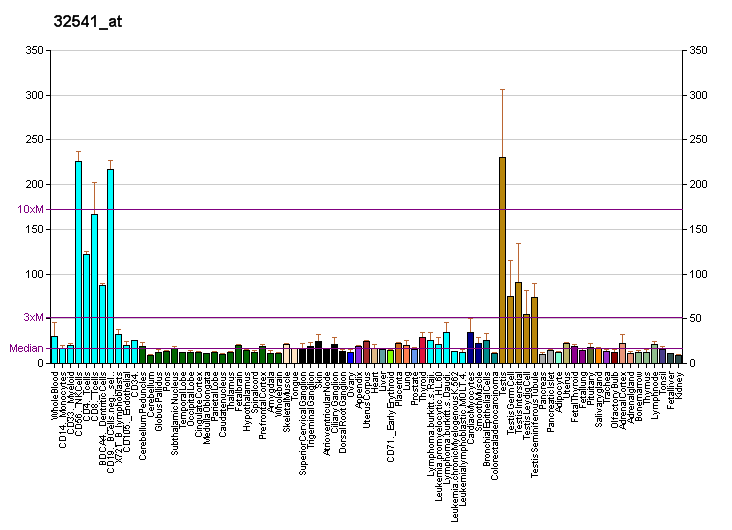

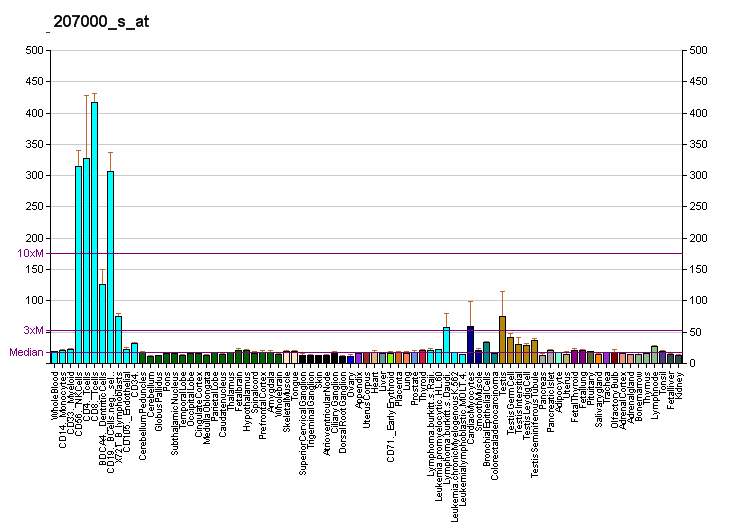
RNA expression pattern
Bgee	Human / Mouse (ortholog); Top expressed in: gastrocnemius muscle; Achilles tendon; muscle of thigh; granulocyte; left testis; Skeletal muscle tissue of rectus abdominis; tibial arteries; right testis; left ventricle; vastus lateralis muscle / Top expressed in: spermatocyte; spermatid; neural layer of retina; seminiferous tubule; lumbar spinal ganglion; cardiac muscle tissue of left ventricle; interventricular septum; muscle of thigh; right kidney; extensor digitorum longus muscle; More reference expression data
BioGPS	More reference expression data
Gene ontology
Molecular function	phosphoprotein phosphatase activity; protein binding; hydrolase activity; metal ion binding; calmodulin binding; calmodulin-dependent protein phosphatase activity
Cellular component	cytosol; cytoplasm; presynapse; glutamatergic synapse; presynaptic cytosol; calcineurin complex; mitochondrion
Biological process	brain development; protein dephosphorylation; calcineurin-NFAT signaling cascade; positive regulation of synaptic vesicle endocytosis; regulation of synaptic vesicle endocytosis; calcineurin-mediated signaling; positive regulation of protein insertion into mitochondrial membrane involved in apoptotic signaling pathway
Sources:Amigo / QuickGO
Orthologs
Databases	NCBI: entry; OMA: entry
Species	Human	Mouse
Entrez	5533	19057
Ensembl	ENSG00000120910	ENSMUSG00000022092
UniProt	P48454	P48455
RefSeq (mRNA)	NM_001243974; NM_001243975; NM_005605	NM_008915; NM_001304991; NM_001304992; NM_001360229
RefSeq (protein)	NP_001230903; NP_001230904; NP_005596	NP_001291920; NP_001291921; NP_032941; NP_001347158
Location (UCSC)	Chr 8: 22.44 – 22.54 Mb	Chr 14: 70.22 – 70.29 Mb
PubMed search
- Wikidata
View/Edit Human	View/Edit Mouse

Serine/threonine-protein phosphatase 2B catalytic subunit gamma isoform (PP2BC) is an enzyme that in humans is encoded by the PPP3CC gene.

Calmodulin-dependent protein phosphatase, calcineurin, is involved in a wide range of biologic activities, acting as a Ca(2+)-dependent modifier of phosphorylation status.

In testis, the motility of the sperm is thought to be controlled by cAMP-dependent phosphorylation and a unique form of calcineurin appears to be associated with the flagellum. The calcineurin holoenzyme is composed of catalytic and regulatory subunits of 60 and 18 kD, respectively.

At least 3 genes, calcineurin A-alpha (CALNA1; MIM 114105), calcineurin A-beta (CALNA2; MIM 114106), and calcineurin A-gamma (CALNA3), have been cloned for the catalytic subunit. These genes have been identified in humans, mice, and rats, and are highly conserved between species (90 to 95% amino acid identity).[supplied by OMIM]
