= Tohru Kino =

Japanese chemist and pharmacologist

- Japanese: 木野 亨
- Known for: Discovery of tacrolimus

Tohru Kino (木野 亨, Kino Tōru) is a Japanese chemist and pharmacologist, best known for his discovery of tacrolimus.

While working for Fujisawa Pharmaceutical Company in the 1980s (Astellas Pharma today), Kino and his colleagues found that FK-506 (now called tacrolimus), which is produced by the soil bacterium Streptomyces tsukubaensisis, could be expected to be an immunosuppressive drug.

For his achievement, Kino received the Prime Minister Award from the Japan Institute of Invention and Innovation in 2004.
