= RCAN3 =

Protein-coding gene in humans

Identifiers
- Aliases: RCAN3, DSCR1L2, MCIP3, RCN3, hRCN3, RCAN family member 3
- External IDs: OMIM: 605860; MGI: 1858220; GeneCards: RCAN3

Gene location (Human)
Chr.	Chromosome 1 (human)
Band	1p36.11	Start	24,502,351 bp
Band	1p36.11	End	24,541,040 bp

Gene location (Mouse)
Chr.	Chromosome 4 (mouse)
Band	4 D3|4 67.59 cM	Start	135,139,619 bp
Band	4 D3|4 67.59 cM	End	135,161,164 bp
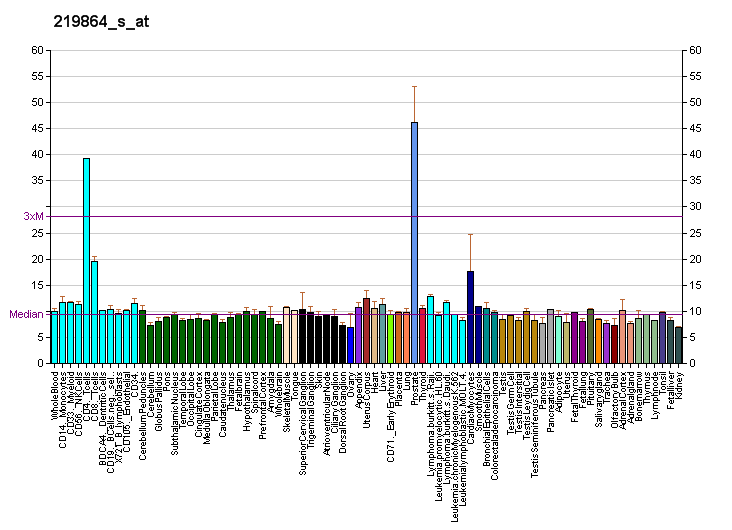
RNA expression pattern
Bgee	Human / Mouse (ortholog); Top expressed in: bronchial epithelial cell; epithelium of nasopharynx; sperm; cerebellar vermis; skin of thigh; gingival epithelium; corpus epididymis; skin of hip; parotid gland; oral cavity / Top expressed in: zygote; secondary oocyte; islet of Langerhans; ventral tegmental area; vestibular membrane of cochlear duct; dorsal tegmental nucleus; primary oocyte; dorsomedial hypothalamic nucleus; central gray substance of midbrain; neural layer of retina; More reference expression data
BioGPS	More reference expression data
Gene ontology
Molecular function	protein binding; troponin I binding; calcium-dependent protein serine/threonine phosphatase regulator activity; RNA binding; nucleic acid binding; phosphatase binding
Cellular component	cytoplasm
Biological process	regulation of calcineurin-NFAT signaling cascade; anatomical structure morphogenesis; calcium-mediated signaling; regulation of phosphoprotein phosphatase activity
Sources:Amigo / QuickGO
Orthologs
Databases	NCBI: entry; OMA: entry
Species	Human	Mouse
Entrez	11123	53902
Ensembl	ENSG00000117602	ENSMUSG00000059713
UniProt	Q9UKA8	Q9JKK0
RefSeq (mRNA)	NM_013441; NM_001251977; NM_001251978; NM_001251979; NM_001251980 NM_001251981; NM_001251982; NM_001251983; NM_001251984; NM_001251985	NM_022980
RefSeq (protein)	NP_001238906; NP_001238907; NP_001238908; NP_001238909; NP_001238910 NP_001238911; NP_001238912; NP_001238913; NP_001238914; NP_038469	NP_075356
Location (UCSC)	Chr 1: 24.5 – 24.54 Mb	Chr 4: 135.14 – 135.16 Mb
PubMed search
- Wikidata
View/Edit Human	View/Edit Mouse

RCAN3 is a gene that in humans encodes the Calcipressin-3 protein.

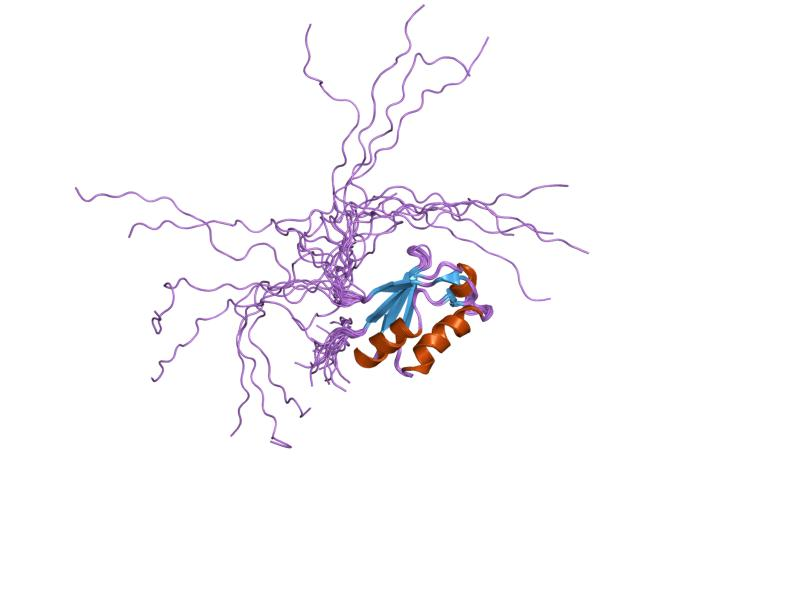
Calcipressin-1, which shares a similar function to Calcipressin-3. Both repress calcineurin.

Calcipressin-3 is a protein that in humans is encoded by the RCAN3 gene and is a member of the Calcipressin family of proteins.

== Expression ==
RCAN3 is highly expressed in the Cerebellar Hemisphere, Prostrate, and the Mucosa of the esophagus.

== Orthologs ==
RCAN3 was present in the common ancestor of all animals. As a result, orthologs are present in other species, including mice (Rcan3), chickens (RCAN3), and zebrafish (rcan3).

== Clinical significance ==
Calcipressin-3, along with the other two Calcipressin proteins have been identified as possible contributing factors to Down syndrome in humans.

== See also ==
- RCAN1
- RCAN2
