= Veloxis Pharmaceuticals =

Pharmaceutical company

Veloxis Pharmaceuticals A/S
- Company type: Subsidiary
- Industry: Pharmaceuticals
- Founded: 21 March 2002
- Headquarters: Hørsholm, Denmark
- Key people: Craig Collard (CEO), Michael Heffernan (Chairman)
- Products: Orally-delivered pharmaceuticals
- Revenue: 14,150,000 Danish krone
- Net income: −176,106,000 Danish krone
- Number of employees: 51
- Website: www.veloxis.com

Veloxis Pharmaceuticals A/S, formerly LifeCycle Pharma A/S, develops improved versions of difficult-to-formulate drugs with its proprietary drug formulation technology, called MeltDose®. Veloxis is focused on building a clinical and market-stage pharmaceutical business around its late-stage transplant immunosuppression product candidate LCP-Tacro. The company was founded in 2002 as a spin-off from H. Lundbeck A/S. Veloxis is headquartered in Hørsholm, Denmark, with an office in Cary, North Carolina.

== MeltDose Technology Platform ==
MeltDose works by incorporating a drug substance with low water solubility into a "meltable" vehicle. It is then sprayed on an inert particulate carrier using fluid bed equipment.

The melt is solidified when deposed on a particle carrier, and thus captures the active drug in a solid dispersion either as a solid solution or in a nano-crystalline state. The particle size is then increased by controlling and optimizing the product temperature and feed rate of the melt.

The granulate can be directly compressed into tablets without additional processing steps besides blending with a lubricant. In addition, the technology allows for customization of the release profile.

Once in tablet form, the dissolution profile and the particle size of drugs manufactured using MeltDose® technology remain stable allowing for a long shelf-life.

== Product Pipeline ==
- LCP-Tacro (tacrolimus) is a once-daily dosage version of tacrolimus for prevention of rejection in organ transplant patients in two Phase 3 clinical trials in kidney transplant patients. The first study in stable transplant patients showed that LCP-Tacro was non-inferior in efficacy and safety compared to twice-daily tacrolimus (Prograf®) [ESOT REF]. The second Phase 3 clinical trial in de novo patients is ongoing. A Phase 3b clinical trial evaluating whether patients experiencing symptomatic tremor on twice-daily tacrolimus demonstrate improvement in their tremors when switched to LCP-Tacro was published in 2017, and demonstrated that LCP-Tacro resulted in improvements on a number of patient-reported outcomes.
- FENOGLIDE (fenofibrate) for dyslipidemia, marketed in the U.S. by Santarus, Inc.
