= IGBP1 =

Protein-coding gene in the species Homo sapiens

Identifiers
- Aliases: IGBP1, ALPHA-4, IBP1, immunoglobulin (CD79A) binding protein 1, immunoglobulin binding protein 1, alpha4, MRXS28
- External IDs: OMIM: 300139; MGI: 1346500; GeneCards: IGBP1
Available structures
PDB	Ortholog search: PDBe RCSB
PDB	List of PDB id codes 4IYP

Gene location (Human)
Chr.	X chromosome (human)
Band	Xq13.1	Start	70,133,447 bp
Band	Xq13.1	End	70,166,324 bp

Gene location (Mouse)
Chr.	X chromosome (mouse)
Band	X|X C3	Start	99,537,897 bp
Band	X|X C3	End	99,559,731 bp
RNA expression pattern
Bgee	Human / Mouse (ortholog); Top expressed in: body of pancreas; left ovary; tendon of biceps brachii; ganglionic eminence; gastrocnemius muscle; glutes; Achilles tendon; parotid gland; right ovary; monocyte / Top expressed in: vas deferens; left lung lobe; seminal vesicula; efferent ductule; migratory enteric neural crest cell; skin of external ear; conjunctival fornix; fossa; lacrimal gland; external carotid artery; More reference expression data
BioGPS	n/a
Gene ontology
Molecular function	protein binding; protein phosphatase regulator activity; protein phosphatase 2A binding
Cellular component	cytoplasm; cytosol
Biological process	negative regulation of cysteine-type endopeptidase activity involved in apoptotic process; response to interleukin-1; regulation of microtubule-based movement; negative regulation of transcription by RNA polymerase II; response to tumor necrosis factor; B cell activation; regulation of signal transduction; negative regulation of stress-activated MAPK cascade; signal transduction; regulation of dephosphorylation; regulation of phosphoprotein phosphatase activity
Sources:Amigo / QuickGO
Orthologs
Databases	NCBI: entry; OMA: entry
Species	Human	Mouse
Entrez	3476	18518
Ensembl	ENSG00000089289	ENSMUSG00000031221
UniProt	P78318	Q61249
RefSeq (mRNA)	NM_001551; NM_001370192; NM_001370193; NM_001370194	NM_008784
RefSeq (protein)	NP_001542; NP_001357121; NP_001357122; NP_001357123	NP_032810
Location (UCSC)	Chr X: 70.13 – 70.17 Mb	Chr X: 99.54 – 99.56 Mb
PubMed search
- Wikidata
View/Edit Human	View/Edit Mouse

Immunoglobulin-binding protein 1 is a protein that in humans is encoded by the IGBP1 gene.

== Function ==
The proliferation and differentiation of B cells is dependent upon a B-cell antigen receptor (BCR) complex. Binding of antigens to specific B-cell receptors results in a tyrosine phosphorylation reaction through the BCR complex and leads to multiple signal transduction pathways.

== Interactions ==
IGBP1 has been shown to interact with PPP4C, PPP6C and PPP2CA.
