= Protein serine/threonine phosphatase =

Class of enzymes

protein-serine/threonine phosphatase
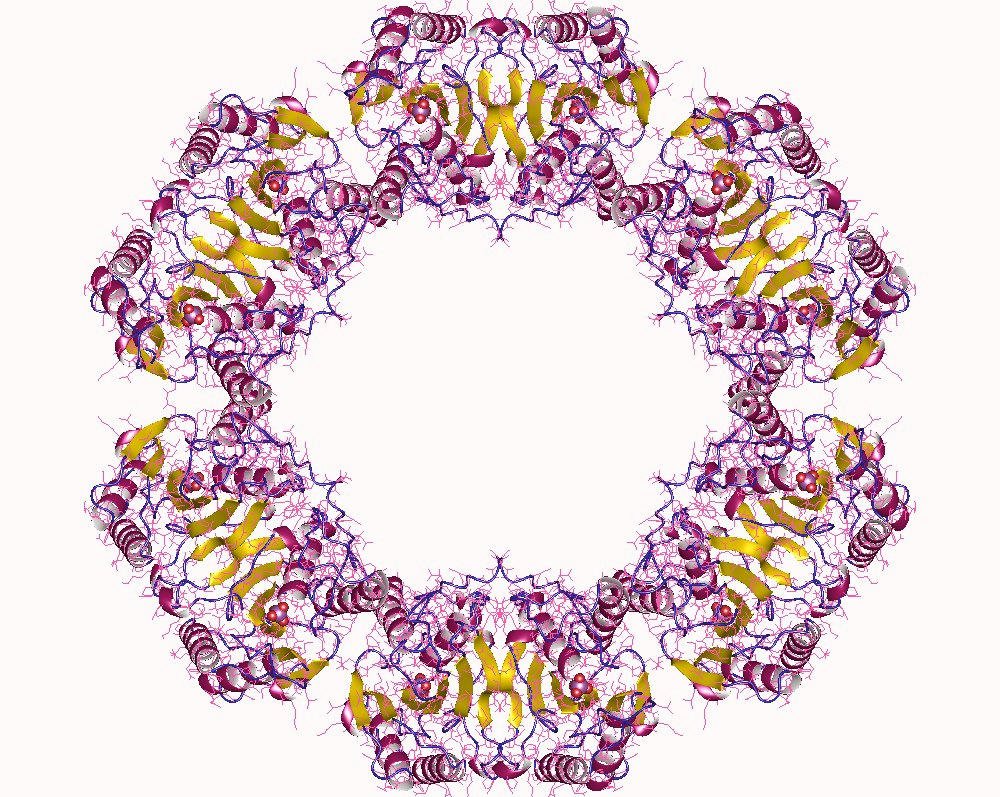
- Protein serine/threonine phosphatase dodecamer, Human

Identifiers
- EC no.: 3.1.3.16
- CAS no.: 9025-75-6

Databases
- BRENDA: enzyme data
- ExPASy: NiceZyme view
- KEGG: enzyme entry
- MetaCyc: metabolic pathway
- Rhea: reactions
- PDB structures: RCSB PDB PDBe PDBsum
Search
- PMC: articles
- PubMed: articles
- NCBI: proteins

The enzyme protein serine/threonine phosphatase (EC 3.1.3.16; systematic name protein-serine/threonine-phosphate phosphohydrolase) is a form of phosphoprotein phosphatase that acts upon phosphorylated serine/threonine residues:

[a protein]-serine/threonine phosphate + H_{2}O = [a protein]-serine/threonine + phosphate

Serine and threonine phosphates are stable under physiological conditions, so a phosphatase enzyme has to remove the phosphate to reverse the regulation signal. Ser/Thr-specific protein phosphatases are regulated partly by their location within the cell and by specific inhibitor proteins.

Serine and threonine are amino acids which have similar side-chain compositions that contain a hydroxyl group and thus can be phosphorylated by enzymes called serine/threonine protein kinases. The addition of the phosphate group can be reversed by enzymes called serine/threonine phosphatases. The addition and removal of phosphate groups regulates many cellular pathways involved in cell proliferation, programmed cell death (apoptosis), embryonic development, and cell differentiation.

== Examples ==
There are several known groups with numerous members in each:

- PPP1 (α, β, γ1, γ2)
- PPP2 (formerly 2A)
- PPP3 (formerly 2b, also known as calcineurin)
- PPP2C
- PPP4
- PPP5
- PPP6

(links are to the catalytic subunit)
