= RCAN1 =

Protein-coding gene in humans

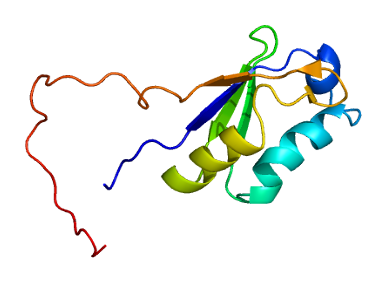

Identifiers
- Aliases: RCAN1, ADAPT78, CSP1, DSC1, DSCR1, MCIP1, RCN1, regulator of calcineurin 1
- External IDs: OMIM: 602917; MGI: 1890564; GeneCards: RCAN1
Available structures
PDB	Ortholog search: PDBe RCSB
PDB	List of PDB id codes 1WEY

Gene location (Human)
Chr.	Chromosome 21 (human)
Band	21q22.12	Start	34,513,142 bp
Band	21q22.12	End	34,615,113 bp

Gene location (Mouse)
Chr.	Chromosome 16 (mouse)
Band	16 C4|16 53.6 cM	Start	92,188,841 bp
Band	16 C4|16 53.6 cM	End	92,267,755 bp
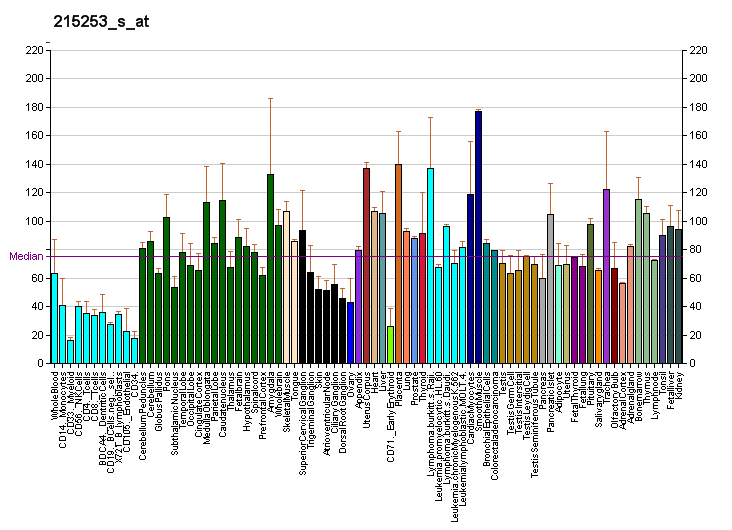

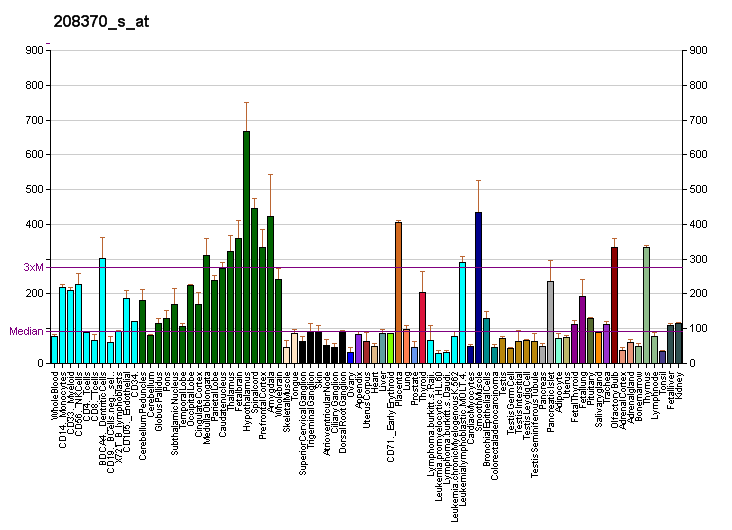
RNA expression pattern
Bgee	Human / Mouse (ortholog); Top expressed in: optic nerve; cartilage tissue; C1 segment; vena cava; epithelium of lactiferous gland; lactiferous duct; internal globus pallidus; glomerulus; metanephric glomerulus; mucosa of urinary bladder / Top expressed in: epithelium of lens; endocardial cushion; soleus muscle; ankle joint; plantaris muscle; temporal muscle; atrioventricular valve; right kidney; cardiac muscle tissue of left ventricle; vastus lateralis muscle; More reference expression data
BioGPS	More reference expression data
Gene ontology
Molecular function	DNA-binding transcription factor activity; DNA binding; protein binding; calcium-dependent protein serine/threonine phosphatase regulator activity; identical protein binding; nucleic acid binding
Cellular component	cytoplasm; nucleus
Biological process	regulation of calcineurin-NFAT signaling cascade; central nervous system development; calcineurin-NFAT signaling cascade; blood circulation; signal transduction; calcium-mediated signaling; regulation of transcription, DNA-templated; regulation of phosphoprotein phosphatase activity; negative regulation of calcineurin-NFAT signaling cascade
Sources:Amigo / QuickGO
Orthologs
Databases	NCBI: entry; OMA: entry
Species	Human	Mouse
Entrez	1827	54720
Ensembl	ENSG00000159200	ENSMUSG00000022951
UniProt	P53805	Q9JHG6
RefSeq (mRNA)	NM_001285389; NM_001285391; NM_001285392; NM_001285393; NM_004414 NM_203417; NM_203418; NM_001331016	NM_001081549; NM_019466
RefSeq (protein)	NP_001272318; NP_001272320; NP_001272321; NP_001272322; NP_001317945 NP_004405; NP_981962; NP_981963	NP_001075018; NP_062339
Location (UCSC)	Chr 21: 34.51 – 34.62 Mb	Chr 16: 92.19 – 92.27 Mb
PubMed search
- Wikidata
View/Edit Human	View/Edit Mouse

Down syndrome critical region gene 1, also known as DSCR1, is a protein that in humans is encoded by the RCAN1 gene.

== Gene location and organization ==
DSCR1 in human is located at the centromeric border of the DSCR and encodes an inhibitor of calcineurin/ NFAT (nuclear factor activated T cells) signalling.

DSCR1 genomic sequence of total 45 kb contain 7 exons and 6 introns, different cDNA analysis yield first four exons are alternative and code for two isoforms of 197 amino acids, and one isoform code for 171 amino acids which differ in their N terminal . While the rest of the 168 residues are common. There is also alternative promoter region with about 900 bp between exon 3 and 4 suggesting that the fourth isoform might be penetrated from another promoter.

== Structure ==
DSCR1 Consist of putative functional motifs and calcineurin binding domain. DSCR1 contains two proline-rich SH3 binding domain, usually named proline-rich domain (PRD), which defines the protein family. SH3 domains or PRD are very important to allow the binding of the protein to endocytosis-related proteins such as ITSN1 and amphiphysin 1 and 2.

== Function ==
The protein encoded by this gene interacts with calcineurin A and inhibits calcineurin-dependent signaling pathways of genetic transcription, possibly affecting central nervous system development. Three transcript variants encoding three different isoforms have been found for this gene. In endothelial cells, VEGF stimulates RCAN1.4 expression which regulates gene expression, cell migration and tubular morphogenesis.

== Clinical significance ==
This gene is located in the minimal candidate region for the Down syndrome phenotype, and is overexpressed in the brain of Down syndrome fetuses. Chronic overexpression of this gene may lead to neurofibrillary tangles such as those associated with Alzheimer's disease. RCAN1 helps coordinate whole-body metabolism and can be an important target in treatment of obesity.

== Associated diseases ==
=== Central nervous system ===
All Down syndrome (DS) patients develop neuropathological changes identical to the pathogenesis of Alzheimer's disease (AD) in middle age, such as neuritic plaques and neuronal loss. Therefore, DS patients are perfect models to study AD pathogenesis. Chronic DSCR1 overexpression is related with DS and AD, while its shortage is reported in Huntington's disease. DSCR1 expressed excessively in the Central Nervous System of embryos, and the protein is later overexpressed in brains of DS patients. However, neurotrophic peptide PACAP (or Pituitary adenylate cyclase-activating peptide) which is responsible for the development, differentiation, and survival, and various parts of memory and learning, targets RCAN1, a Down syndrome related gene, induces the expression of regulator of calcineurin 1, through activation of the PKA-CREB pathway, and this is important to understand the mechanisms of neural differentiation and aim for proper expression of RCAN1.

=== Cancer ===
It is suggested that the reason patients with Down syndrome are less predisposed to certain cancers is due to the impact of this gene of reducing blood supply to tumour cells. It is also proposed by epidemiological studies that DS patients are in greater risk of leukaemia, on the other hand they are at lower risk of cancer and other angiogenesis related diseases such as diabetic retinopathy and atherosclerosis, indicating that one or more trisomic genes on chromosome 21 is responsible for protecting DS patients against cancer, and this cancer defence could be a result of angiogenesis suppression.

== Interactions ==
DSCR1 has been shown to interact with Calcineurin.

Hydrogen peroxide (H_{2}O_{2}) increases the overexpression of protein RCAN1. However, anti-oxidants and inhibitors of mitogen-activated protein kinases (MAPK) treatment block the increased expression of RCAN1 by H_{2}O_{2}. Demonstrating that the increased expression is a result of generating reactive oxygen species and activation of MAPK. Furthermore, phosphorylation is important to regulator RCAN1 protein expression. Because phosphorylation of RCAN1 expression by H_{2}O_{2} increases of the half-life of the protein.

== See also ==
- RCAN2
- RCAN3
