= Streptomyces tsukubensis =

Scientific classification
- Domain: Bacteria
- Kingdom: Bacillati
- Phylum: Actinomycetota
- Class: Actinomycetia
- Order: Streptomycetales
- Family: Streptomycetaceae
- Genus: Streptomyces
- Species: S. tsukubensis

Binomial name
- Streptomyces tsukubensis Muramatsu and Nagai 2013

Type strain
- 9993, DSM 42081, NBRC 108819, NBRC 108919

Synonyms
- "Streptomyces tsukubaensis" Tanaka et al. 1987

Species of bacterium

Streptomyces tsukubensis is a bacterium species from the genus of Streptomyces which has been isolated from soil in Ibaraki in Japan. Streptomyces tsukubensis produces the immunosuppressant tacrolimus.

== See also ==
- List of Streptomyces species
