= RCAN2 =

Protein-coding gene in the species Homo sapiens

Identifiers
- Aliases: RCAN2, CSP2, DSCR1L1, MCIP2, RCN2, ZAKI-4, ZAKI4, regulator of calcineurin 2
- External IDs: OMIM: 604876; MGI: 1858219; GeneCards: RCAN2

Gene location (Human)
Chr.	Chromosome 6 (human)
Band	6p12.3	Start	46,220,736 bp
Band	6p12.3	End	46,491,972 bp

Gene location (Mouse)
Chr.	Chromosome 17 (mouse)
Band	17 B3|17 19.77 cM	Start	44,112,242 bp
Band	17 B3|17 19.77 cM	End	44,350,407 bp
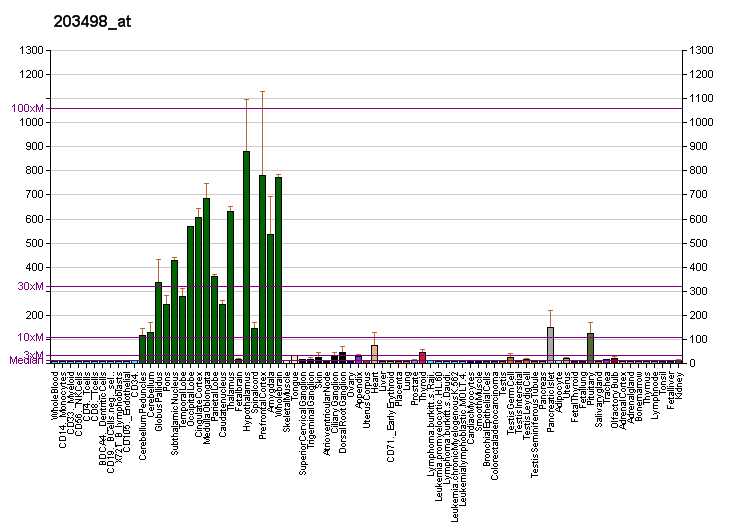
RNA expression pattern
Bgee	Human / Mouse (ortholog); Top expressed in: lateral nuclear group of thalamus; pars compacta; pars reticulata; pons; right ventricle; middle temporal gyrus; endothelial cell; external globus pallidus; Brodmann area 23; superior vestibular nucleus / Top expressed in: interventricular septum; extraocular muscle; motor neuron; superior colliculus; right ventricle; myocardium of ventricle; cardiac muscles; molar; central gray substance of midbrain; medial vestibular nucleus; More reference expression data
BioGPS	More reference expression data
Gene ontology
Molecular function	calcium-dependent protein serine/threonine phosphatase regulator activity; nucleic acid binding
Cellular component	cytoplasm; cellular component
Biological process	regulation of calcineurin-NFAT signaling cascade; calcium-mediated signaling; regulation of phosphoprotein phosphatase activity
Sources:Amigo / QuickGO
Orthologs
Databases	NCBI: entry; OMA: entry
Species	Human	Mouse
Entrez	10231	53901
Ensembl	ENSG00000172348	ENSMUSG00000039601
UniProt	Q14206	Q9JHG2
RefSeq (mRNA)	NM_001251973; NM_001251974; NM_005822	NM_001286653; NM_001286654; NM_030598; NM_207649; NM_001357742
RefSeq (protein)	NP_001238902; NP_001238903; NP_005813	NP_001273582; NP_001273583; NP_085101; NP_997532; NP_001344671
Location (UCSC)	Chr 6: 46.22 – 46.49 Mb	Chr 17: 44.11 – 44.35 Mb
PubMed search
- Wikidata
View/Edit Human	View/Edit Mouse

RCAN2 is a gene that in humans encodes for the protein Calcipressin-2.

Calcipressin-2 is a protein that in humans is encoded by the RCAN2 gene.

== See also ==
- RCAN1
- RCAN3
