= Satchidananda Panda =

Indian-American chronobiologist

Satchin Panda
- Born: 1971 (age 54–55); Odisha, India
- Education: Scripps Research Institute, PhD 2001
- Known for: melanopsin in the eye, circadian effects of time-restricted eating
- Scientific career
- Fields: Biomedical Sciences, Chronobiology
- Workplaces: Regulatory Biology, Salk Institute
- Website: www.salk.edu/scientist/satchidananda-panda/

Satchidananda "Satchin" Panda (born 1971) is an Indian-American chronobiologist at the Salk Institute for Biological Studies, who has worked in circadian biology. His work includes studies on melanopsin-mediated light sensing and time-restricted eating (TRE), also referred to as intermittent fasting. Panda's researched melanopsin in the eye, a component in regulating the mammalian circadian clock. More recently, his laboratory has focused on the impact of circadian rhythms and TRE on metabolism and overall health.

== Biography ==
Panda was born and raised in Odisha, India in 1971. He received a degree in plant biology from Odisha University of Agriculture and Technology. After his bachelor’s degree, he attended the Scripps Research Institute in California, where he wrote his thesis on the circadian oscillator mechanism in plants in Dr. Steve Kay’s laboratory. He was awarded his PhD in 2001.

Panda began his career as a Postdoctoral Researcher for the Genomics Institute of the Novartis Research Foundation in San Diego, California. He transferred to the Salk Institute for Biological Studies in December 2004, working as an Associate Professor. In March 2016, Dr. Panda became a Professor. In addition, he served as an adjunct professor for UC San Diego in the Department of Cell and Developmental Biology.

== Research contributions ==
=== myCircadianClock ===
Panda developed the app myCircadianClock to aid research in circadian rhythms. The application allows users to log eating, sleeping, and activity habits. The app is publicly available but requires an access code from Panda Lab to use.

=== Melanopsin and ambient blue‑light signaling ===
Panda’s early work on melanopsin contributed to understanding the mechanisms underlying non‑image‑forming light perception. His team identified melanopsin, a blue light–sensitive photopigment expressed in intrinsically photosensitive retinal ganglion cells, as contributing to conveying ambient light information to the brain’s master clock in the suprachiasmatic nucleus. This research contributed to clarifying how light cues synchronize circadian rhythms and regulate sleep–wake cycles, hormone secretion, and physiological timing. The findings were cited in research into light therapy for insomnia, ADHD, migraines, and other disorders, and informed public‑health guidelines aimed at reducing night‑time blue‑light exposure.

=== Time-restricted eating ===
Panda’s research on time-restricted eating (TRE) demonstrated that limiting food consumption to a consistent 8–12‑hour window without reducing total calories prevented obesity, improved glucose regulation, and mitigated metabolic disorders in mice. Follow‑up clinical studies showed that eating within a 10‑hour window improved weight, abdominal fat, blood pressure, and glycemic control in individuals with metabolic syndrome. These findings contributed to the popularity of TRE as a lifestyle intervention for obesity and diabetes and focused on the importance of meal timing in metabolic homeostasis.

== Allegations of sexual misconduct ==
In July 2026, Science reported that Panda intended to resign from the Salk Institute effective August 13, 2026, following an independent investigation into allegations of sexual misconduct. Panda denied the allegations. The institute confirmed that it had conducted an independent investigation after a research assistant raised "workplace concerns", but declined to disclose the nature of the allegations, the investigation's findings, or its outcome. Science reported that some current and former employees were concerned that allowing Panda to resign without publicly disclosing the investigation could allow him to move to another institution without colleagues being aware of previous concerns about his conduct. Science also reported that, according to a source with knowledge of the matter, Salk had previously investigated Panda over separate allegations of sexual misconduct and had taken disciplinary action.

== Selected publications ==
- Panda, Satchidananda (November 9, 2021). The Circadian Diabetes Code: Discover the Right Time to Eat, Sleep, and Exercise to Prevent and Reverse Prediabetes and Diabetes. Penguin Random House. ISBN 9780593231890.
- Longo, Valter D.; Panda, Satchidananda (2016-06-14). "Fasting, Circadian Rhythms, and Time-Restricted Feeding in Healthy Lifespan". Cell Metabolism. 23 (6): 1048–1059. doi:10.1016/j.cmet.2016.06.001. ISSN 1550-4131. PMC 5388543. PMID 27304506.
- "Clinical study finds eating within a 10-hour window may help stave off diabetes, heart disease". Salk Institute for Biological Studies.
- Panda, Satchidananda; Nayak, Surendra K.; Campo, Brice; Walker, John R.; Hogenesch, John B.; Jegla, Tim (2005-01-28). "Illumination of the Melanopsin Signaling Pathway". Science. 307 (5709): 600–604. Bibcode:2005Sci...307..600P. doi:10.1126/science.1105121. PMID 15681390.
- “Melanopsin Is Required for Non‑Image‑Forming Photic Responses in Blind Mice” (2003) – demonstrated that melanopsin‑expressing retinal ganglion cells are indispensable for circadian photo entrainment, pupillary reflexes, and other non‑visual light responses.
- Panda, Satchidananda; Sato, Trey K.; Castrucci, Ana Maria; Rollag, Mark D.; DeGrip, Willem J.; Hogenesch, John B.; Provencio, Ignacio; Kay, Steve A. (2002-12-13). "Melanopsin (Opn4) Requirement for Normal Light-Induced Circadian Phase Shifting". Science. 298 (5601): 2213–2216. doi:10.1126/science.1076848. PMID 12481141.
- Panda, Satchidananda; Antoch, Marina P.; Miller, Brooke H.; Su, Andrew I.; Schook, Andrew B.; Straume, Marty; Schultz, Peter G.; Kay, Steve A.; Takahashi, Joseph S.; Hogenesch, John B. (2002-05-03). "Coordinated Transcription of Key Pathways in the Mouse by the Circadian Clock". Cell. 109 (3): 307–320. doi:10.1016/S0092-8674(02)00722-5. ISSN 0092-8674. PMID 12015981.

=== Awards ===
- (2006) Pew Scholar in the Biomedical Sciences
- (2006) Dana Foundation Award in Brain and Immune System Imaging
- (2014) The Julie Martin Mid-Career Award in Aging Research
- (2021) Honored with Rita and Richard Atkinson Chair
- (2023) Fellow of the American Association for the Advancement of Science (AAAS)
