= NFATC4 =

Protein-coding gene in the species Homo sapiens

Identifiers
- Aliases: NFATC4, NF-AT3, NF-ATC4, NFAT3, nuclear factor of activated T-cells 4, nuclear factor of activated T cells 4
- External IDs: OMIM: 602699; MGI: 1920431; GeneCards: NFATC4
Available structures
PDB	Ortholog search: PDBe RCSB
PDB	List of PDB id codes 2YRP

Gene location (Human)
Chr.	Chromosome 14 (human)
Band	14q12	Start	24,365,673 bp
Band	14q12	End	24,379,604 bp

Gene location (Mouse)
Chr.	Chromosome 14 (mouse)
Band	14|14 C3	Start	56,060,601 bp
Band	14|14 C3	End	56,071,400 bp
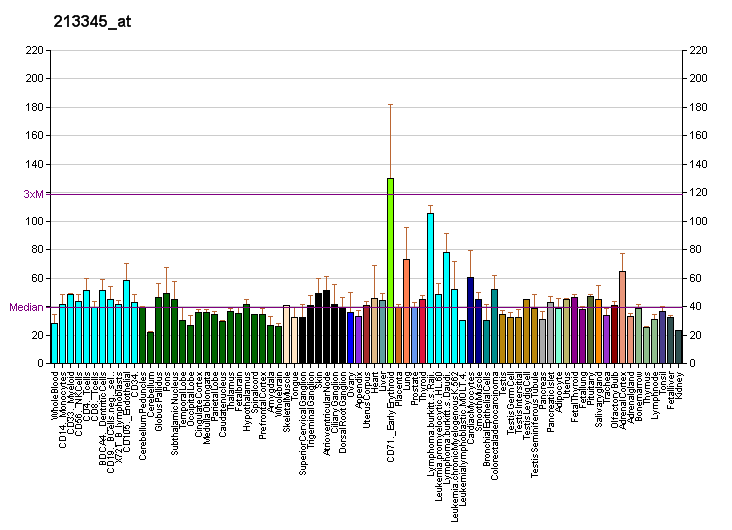

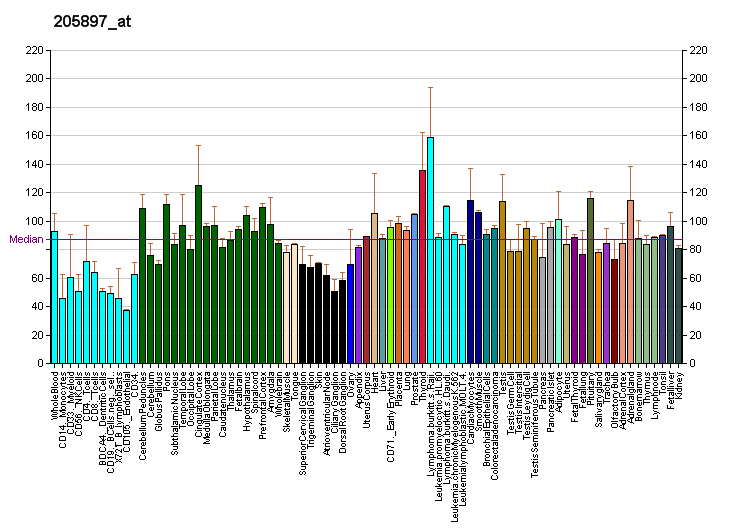
RNA expression pattern
Bgee	Human / Mouse (ortholog); Top expressed in: canal of the cervix; right ovary; left ovary; stromal cell of endometrium; body of uterus; left uterine tube; myometrium; gastric mucosa; muscle layer of sigmoid colon; right coronary artery / Top expressed in: gastrula; external carotid artery; internal carotid artery; genital tubercle; maxillary prominence; mandibular prominence; ventricular zone; hand; calvaria; abdominal wall; More reference expression data
BioGPS	More reference expression data
Gene ontology
Molecular function	DNA binding; DNA-binding transcription factor activity; transcription coactivator activity; transcription factor binding; RNA polymerase II cis-regulatory region sequence-specific DNA binding; DNA-binding transcription repressor activity, RNA polymerase II-specific; protein binding; DNA-binding transcription factor activity, RNA polymerase II-specific; peroxisome proliferator activated receptor binding; chromatin binding
Cellular component	transcription regulator complex; nucleus; cytoplasm; cytosol; nuclear speck
Biological process	cell differentiation; regulation of transcription, DNA-templated; cellular response to lithium ion; negative regulation of chromatin binding; cellular response to UV; negative regulation of Wnt signaling pathway; calcineurin-NFAT signaling cascade; positive regulation of apoptotic signaling pathway; negative regulation of transcription by RNA polymerase II; transcription by RNA polymerase II; negative regulation of protein binding; smooth muscle cell differentiation; transcription, DNA-templated; regulation of synaptic plasticity; negative regulation of synapse maturation; development of the heart; negative regulation of dendrite morphogenesis; intrinsic apoptotic signaling pathway in response to DNA damage; positive regulation of tumor necrosis factor production; branching involved in blood vessel morphogenesis; cellular respiration; positive regulation of apoptotic process; inflammatory response; muscle cell development; positive regulation of transcription by RNA polymerase II; negative regulation of pri-miRNA transcription by RNA polymerase II; cellular response to ionomycin; cytokine production; long-term memory; brain-derived neurotrophic factor receptor signaling pathway; negative regulation of neuron apoptotic process; long-term potentiation; multicellular organism development
Sources:Amigo / QuickGO
Orthologs
Databases	NCBI: entry; OMA: entry
Species	Human	Mouse
Entrez	4776	73181
Ensembl	ENSG00000100968; ENSG00000285485	ENSMUSG00000023411
UniProt	Q14934	Q8K120
RefSeq (mRNA)	NM_001136022; NM_001198965; NM_001198966; NM_001198967; NM_001288802 NM_004554; NM_001320043; NM_001363681; NM_001363682	NM_001168346; NM_023699
RefSeq (protein)	NP_001129494; NP_001185894; NP_001185895; NP_001185896; NP_001275731 NP_001306972; NP_004545; NP_001350610; NP_001350611	NP_001161818; NP_076188
Location (UCSC)	Chr 14: 24.37 – 24.38 Mb	Chr 14: 56.06 – 56.07 Mb
PubMed search
- Wikidata
View/Edit Human	View/Edit Mouse

Nuclear factor of activated T-cells, cytoplasmic 4 is a protein that in humans is encoded by the NFATC4 gene.

== Function ==
The product of this gene is a member of the nuclear factors of activated T cells DNA-binding transcription complex. This complex consists of at least two components: a preexisting cytosolic component that translocates to the nucleus upon T cell receptor (TCR) stimulation and an inducible nuclear component. Other members of this family of nuclear factors of activated T cells also participate in the formation of this complex. The product of this gene plays a role in the inducible expression of cytokine genes in T cells, especially in the induction of the IL-2 and IL-4.

== Interactions ==
NFATC4 has been shown to interact with CREB-binding protein.

== See also ==
- NFAT
