= PPP3R1 =

Protein-coding gene in the species Homo sapiens

Identifiers
- Aliases: PPP3R1, CALNB1, CNB, CNB1, protein phosphatase 3 regulatory subunit B, alpha
- External IDs: OMIM: 601302; MGI: 107172; GeneCards: PPP3R1
Available structures
PDB	Ortholog search: PDBe RCSB
PDB	List of PDB id codes 1AUI, 1M63, 1MF8, 2P6B, 3LL8, 4F0Z, 4OR9, 4ORA, 4ORC, 4ORB

Gene location (Human)
Chr.	Chromosome 2 (human)
Band	2p14	Start	68,178,857 bp
Band	2p14	End	68,256,237 bp

Gene location (Mouse)
Chr.	Chromosome 11 (mouse)
Band	11|11 A2	Start	17,109,263 bp
Band	11|11 A2	End	17,150,375 bp
RNA expression pattern
Bgee	Human / Mouse (ortholog); Top expressed in: Brodmann area 9; nucleus accumbens; Achilles tendon; right frontal lobe; monocyte; caudate nucleus; prefrontal cortex; putamen; cerebellar hemisphere; amygdala / Top expressed in: CA3 field; perirhinal cortex; Region I of hippocampus proper; olfactory tubercle; entorhinal cortex; dentate gyrus; prefrontal cortex; primary motor cortex; primary visual cortex; superior frontal gyrus; More reference expression data
BioGPS	n/a
Gene ontology
Molecular function	calcium ion binding; protein domain specific binding; metal ion binding; calmodulin binding; protein binding; calcium-dependent protein serine/threonine phosphatase activity; cyclosporin A binding; phosphoprotein phosphatase activity; phosphatase binding
Cellular component	cytoplasm; cytosol; membrane; plasma membrane; nucleoplasm; sarcolemma; calcineurin complex; mitochondrion
Biological process	Fc-epsilon receptor signaling pathway; positive regulation of transcription by RNA polymerase II; protein dephosphorylation; Wnt signaling pathway, calcium modulating pathway; branching involved in blood vessel morphogenesis; epithelial to mesenchymal transition; development of the heart; Schwann cell development; myelination in peripheral nervous system; calcineurin-NFAT signaling cascade; protein localization to nucleus; lung epithelial cell differentiation; protein import into nucleus; positive regulation of protein insertion into mitochondrial membrane involved in apoptotic signaling pathway
Sources:Amigo / QuickGO
Orthologs
Databases	NCBI: entry; OMA: entry
Species	Human	Mouse
Entrez	5534	19058
Ensembl	ENSG00000221823	ENSMUSG00000033953
UniProt	P63098	Q63810
RefSeq (mRNA)	NM_000945	NM_024459
RefSeq (protein)	NP_000936	NP_077779
Location (UCSC)	Chr 2: 68.18 – 68.26 Mb	Chr 11: 17.11 – 17.15 Mb
PubMed search
- Wikidata
View/Edit Human	View/Edit Mouse

Calcineurin subunit B type 1 also known as protein phosphatase 2B regulatory subunit 1 is a protein that in humans is encoded by the PPP3R1 gene.

== Clinical significance ==
The presence of a single nucleotide polymorphism rs1868402 in the PPP3R1 gene is strongly correlated with rapid progress of Alzheimer's disease.
