= PPP6C =

Protein-coding gene in the species Homo sapiens

Identifiers
- Aliases: PPP6C, PP6, PP6C, protein phosphatase 6 catalytic subunit
- External IDs: OMIM: 612725; MGI: 1915107; GeneCards: PPP6C
Enzyme activity
EC #	BRENDA	ExPASy	KEGG	MetaCyc
3.1.3.16	↗	↗	↗	↗

Gene location (Human)
Chr.	Chromosome 9 (human)
Band	9q33.3	Start	125,146,573 bp
Band	9q33.3	End	125,189,939 bp

Gene location (Mouse)
Chr.	Chromosome 2 (mouse)
Band	2|2 B	Start	39,084,366 bp
Band	2|2 B	End	39,116,463 bp
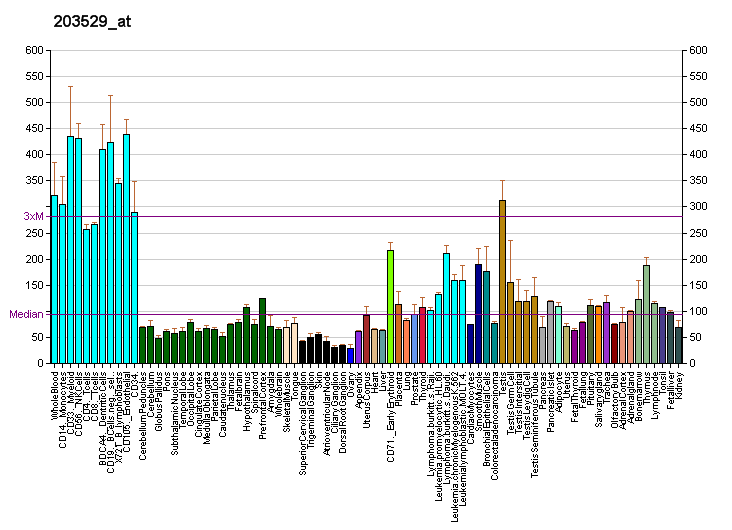

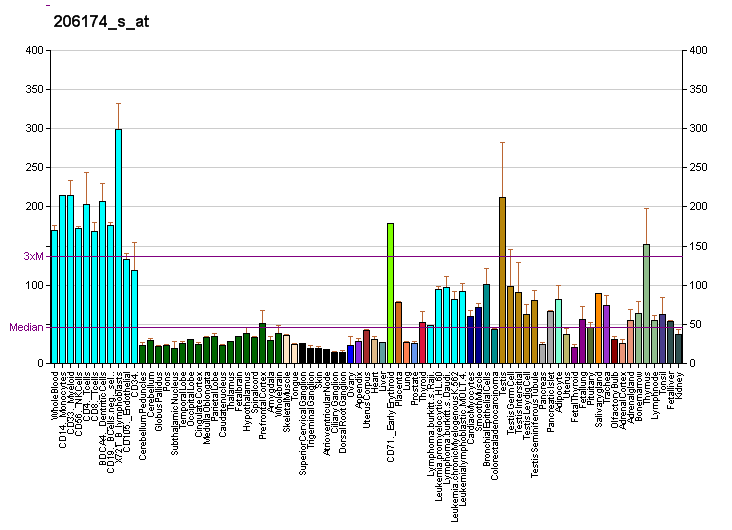
RNA expression pattern
Bgee	Human / Mouse (ortholog); Top expressed in: oocyte; sperm; secondary oocyte; gingival epithelium; parotid gland; buccal mucosa cell; palpebral conjunctiva; amniotic fluid; deltoid muscle; epithelium of nasopharynx / Top expressed in: medullary collecting duct; tail of embryo; genital tubercle; renal corpuscle; triceps brachii muscle; endocardial cushion; vastus lateralis muscle; spermatid; temporal muscle; morula; More reference expression data
BioGPS	More reference expression data
Gene ontology
Molecular function	protein binding; phosphoprotein phosphatase activity; hydrolase activity; metal ion binding; protein serine/threonine phosphatase activity
Cellular component	cytoplasm; cytosol; Golgi membrane; mitochondrion
Biological process	cell cycle; COPII vesicle coating; protein dephosphorylation; immune system process; innate immune response; G1/S transition of mitotic cell cycle
Sources:Amigo / QuickGO
Orthologs
Databases	NCBI: entry; OMA: entry
Species	Human	Mouse
Entrez	5537	67857
Ensembl	ENSG00000119414	ENSMUSG00000026753
UniProt	O00743	Q9CQR6
RefSeq (mRNA)	NM_001123355; NM_001123369; NM_002721	NM_024209
RefSeq (protein)	NP_001116827; NP_001116841; NP_002712	NP_077171
Location (UCSC)	Chr 9: 125.15 – 125.19 Mb	Chr 2: 39.08 – 39.12 Mb
PubMed search
- Wikidata
View/Edit Human	View/Edit Mouse

Serine/threonine-protein phosphatase 6 catalytic subunit is an enzyme that in humans is encoded by the PPP6C gene.

== Interactions ==
PPP6C has been shown to interact with IGBP1.
