= NFATC3 =

Protein-coding gene in the species Homo sapiens

Identifiers
- Aliases: NFATC3, NFAT4, NFATX, nuclear factor of activated T-cells 3, nuclear factor of activated T cells 3, NF-AT4c
- External IDs: OMIM: 602698; MGI: 103296; GeneCards: NFATC3
Available structures
PDB	Ortholog search: PDBe RCSB
PDB	List of PDB id codes 2XRW, 2XS0

Gene location (Human)
Chr.	Chromosome 16 (human)
Band	16q22.1	Start	68,084,751 bp
Band	16q22.1	End	68,229,259 bp

Gene location (Mouse)
Chr.	Chromosome 8 (mouse)
Band	8 D3|8 53.08 cM	Start	106,785,472 bp
Band	8 D3|8 53.08 cM	End	106,857,169 bp
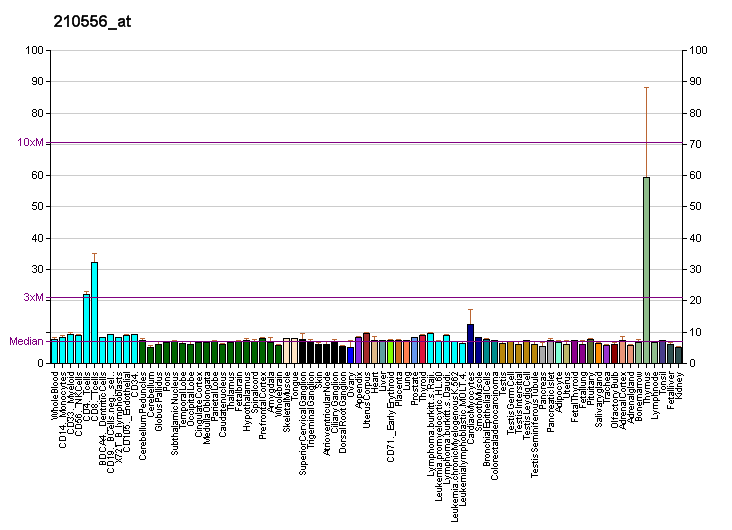

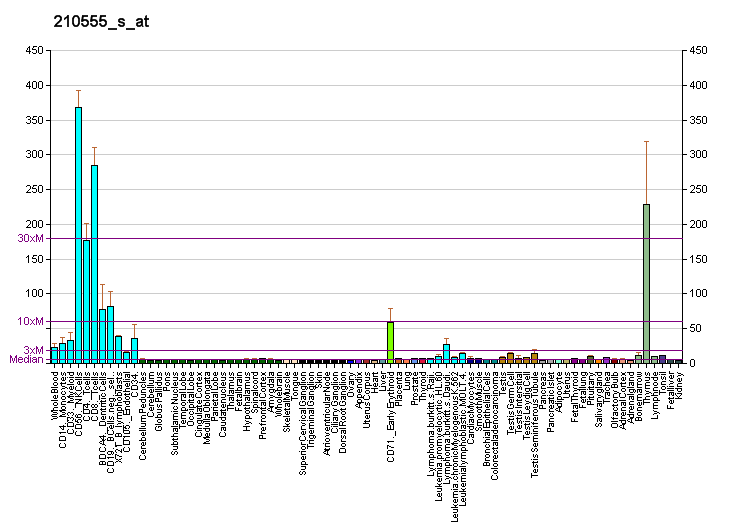

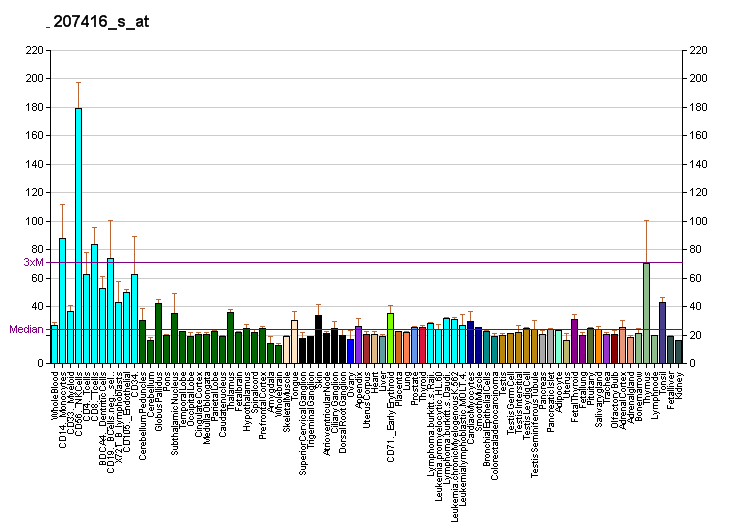
RNA expression pattern
Bgee	Human / Mouse (ortholog); Top expressed in: oocyte; secondary oocyte; bone marrow cell; epithelium of colon; sperm; thymus; gastrocnemius muscle; granulocyte; muscle of thigh; right testis / Top expressed in: thymus; tail of embryo; blood; genital tubercle; fossa; condyle; spleen; Gonadal ridge; dermis; renal corpuscle; More reference expression data
BioGPS	More reference expression data
Gene ontology
Molecular function	DNA binding; DNA-binding transcription factor activity; DNA-binding transcription activator activity, RNA polymerase II-specific; RNA polymerase II cis-regulatory region sequence-specific DNA binding; protein binding; DNA-binding transcription repressor activity, RNA polymerase II-specific; DNA-binding transcription factor activity, RNA polymerase II-specific; chromatin binding; transcription factor binding
Cellular component	cytoplasm; nucleoplasm; nucleus; cytosol; transcription regulator complex
Biological process	regulation of transcription, DNA-templated; regulation of transcription by RNA polymerase II; transcription by RNA polymerase II; transcription, DNA-templated; positive regulation of transcription, DNA-templated; Fc-epsilon receptor signaling pathway; inflammatory response; positive regulation of transcription by RNA polymerase II; negative regulation of pri-miRNA transcription by RNA polymerase II; negative regulation of vascular associated smooth muscle cell differentiation; cytokine production; calcineurin-NFAT signaling cascade; multicellular organism development
Sources:Amigo / QuickGO
Orthologs
Databases	NCBI: entry; OMA: entry
Species	Human	Mouse
Entrez	4775	18021
Ensembl	ENSG00000072736	ENSMUSG00000031902
UniProt	Q12968	P97305
RefSeq (mRNA)	NM_173165; NM_004555; NM_173163; NM_173164	NM_010901; NM_001368796; NM_001368797
RefSeq (protein)	NP_004546; NP_775186; NP_775188; NP_004546.1; NP_775188.1	n/a
Location (UCSC)	Chr 16: 68.08 – 68.23 Mb	Chr 8: 106.79 – 106.86 Mb
PubMed search
- Wikidata
View/Edit Human	View/Edit Mouse

Nuclear factor of activated T-cells, cytoplasmic 3 is a protein that in humans is encoded by the NFATC3 gene.

== Function ==
The product of this gene is a member of the nuclear factors of activated T cells DNA-binding transcription complex. This complex consists of at least two components: a preexisting cytosolic component that translocates to the nucleus upon T cell receptor (TCR) stimulation and an inducible nuclear component. Other members of this family participate to form this complex also. The product of this gene plays a role in the regulation of gene expression in T cells and immature thymocytes. Four transcript variants encoding distinct isoforms have been identified for this gene.

== See also ==
- NFAT
