= PPP3CB =

Protein-coding gene in the species Homo sapiens

Identifiers
- Aliases: PPP3CB, CALNA2, CALNB, CNA2, PP2Bbeta, protein phosphatase 3 catalytic subunit beta
- External IDs: OMIM: 114106; MGI: 107163; GeneCards: PPP3CB
Available structures
PDB	Ortholog search: PDBe RCSB
PDB	List of PDB id codes 4OR9, 4ORA, 4ORC
Enzyme activity
EC #	BRENDA	ExPASy	KEGG	MetaCyc
3.1.3.16	↗	↗	↗	↗

Gene location (Human)
Chr.	Chromosome 10 (human)
Band	10q22.2	Start	73,436,433 bp
Band	10q22.2	End	73,496,024 bp

Gene location (Mouse)
Chr.	Chromosome 14 (mouse)
Band	14|14 A3	Start	20,549,432 bp
Band	14|14 A3	End	20,596,641 bp
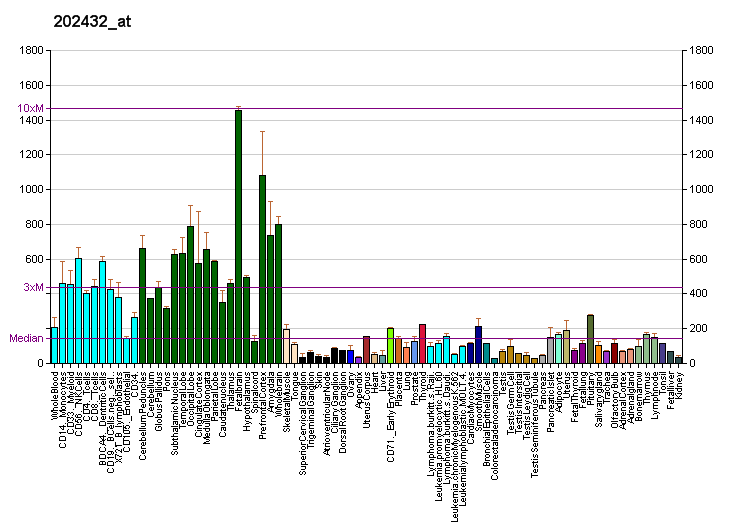

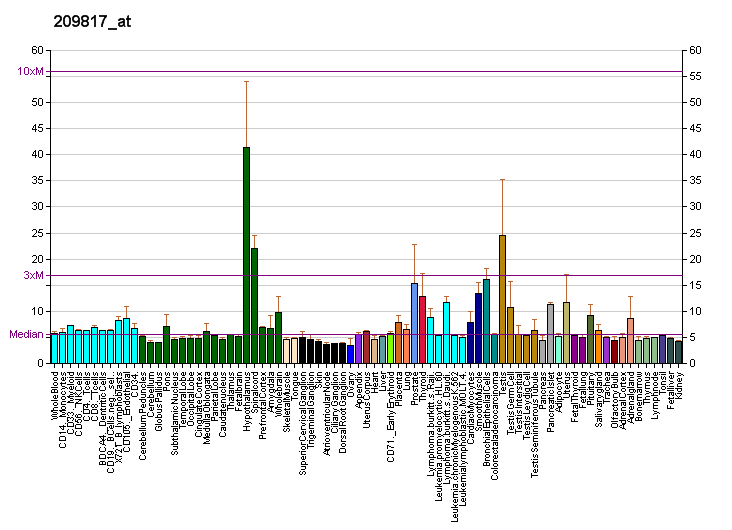
RNA expression pattern
Bgee	Human / Mouse (ortholog); Top expressed in: endothelial cell; Skeletal muscle tissue of rectus abdominis; biceps brachii; Skeletal muscle tissue of biceps brachii; middle temporal gyrus; vastus lateralis muscle; lateral nuclear group of thalamus; superior frontal gyrus; orbitofrontal cortex; glutes / Top expressed in: subiculum; dorsal striatum; triceps brachii muscle; olfactory tubercle; lateral septal nucleus; anterior amygdaloid area; medial dorsal nucleus; temporal muscle; nucleus accumbens; sternocleidomastoid muscle; More reference expression data
BioGPS	More reference expression data
Gene ontology
Molecular function	calcium ion binding; phosphoprotein phosphatase activity; protein dimerization activity; protein serine/threonine phosphatase activity; metal ion binding; calmodulin binding; protein binding; enzyme binding; protein phosphatase 2B binding; hydrolase activity; calmodulin-dependent protein phosphatase activity
Cellular component	cytosol; T-tubule; plasma membrane; calcineurin complex; nucleoplasm; Z discdkac; cytoplasm; glutamatergic synapse
Biological process	response to cytokine; lymphangiogenesis; regulation of insulin secretion; calcineurin-NFAT signaling cascade; memory; learning; regulation of synaptic plasticity; T cell homeostasis; positive regulation of transcription, DNA-templated; negative regulation of T cell mediated cytotoxicity; T cell proliferation; Fc-epsilon receptor signaling pathway; protein phosphorylation; development of the heart; T cell differentiation; axon extension; regulation of gene expression; social behavior; positive regulation of insulin secretion involved in cellular response to glucose stimulus; locomotion involved in locomotory behavior; T cell activation; positive regulation of transcription by RNA polymerase II; calcium-ion regulated exocytosis; signal transduction; dephosphorylation; Wnt signaling pathway, calcium modulating pathway; protein dephosphorylation; regulation of synaptic vesicle endocytosis; calcineurin-mediated signaling
Sources:Amigo / QuickGO
Orthologs
Databases	NCBI: entry; OMA: entry
Species	Human	Mouse
Entrez	5532	19056
Ensembl	ENSG00000107758	ENSMUSG00000021816
UniProt	P16298	P48453
RefSeq (mRNA)	NM_001142353; NM_001142354; NM_001289968; NM_001289969; NM_021132	NM_008914; NM_001310426; NM_001310427
RefSeq (protein)	NP_001135825; NP_001135826; NP_001276897; NP_001276898; NP_066955	NP_001297355; NP_001297356; NP_032940
Location (UCSC)	Chr 10: 73.44 – 73.5 Mb	Chr 14: 20.55 – 20.6 Mb
PubMed search
- Wikidata
View/Edit Human	View/Edit Mouse

Serine/threonine-protein phosphatase 2B catalytic subunit beta isoform (PP2BB) is an enzyme that in humans is encoded by the PPP3CB gene.

== Function and Location ==
Enables different functions, including calmodulin dependent protein phosphatase: calmodulin binding; and binding protein phosphatase 2B.

Calcinuerin-NFAT signaling; lysosome organization; protein regulation to nucleaus.

=== Location ===
Found in the cytoplasm, and is a part of the calcinuerin complex.

Can be related with biomarkers of focal segments of schizophrenia.
