= PPP3R2 =

Protein-coding gene in the species Homo sapiens

Identifiers
- Aliases: PPP3R2, PPP3RL, protein phosphatase 3 regulatory subunit B, beta
- External IDs: OMIM: 613821; MGI: 107171; GeneCards: PPP3R2

Gene location (Human)
Chr.	Chromosome 9 (human)
Band	9q31.1	Start	101,591,604 bp
Band	9q31.1	End	101,595,021 bp

Gene location (Mouse)
Chr.	Chromosome 4 (mouse)
Band	4|4 B1	Start	49,678,747 bp
Band	4|4 B1	End	49,682,024 bp
RNA expression pattern
Bgee	Human / Mouse (ortholog); Top expressed in: sperm; left testis; right testis; testicle; muscular system; muscle; skeletal muscle; lower limb muscles; right coronary artery; muscle of leg / Top expressed in: seminiferous tubule; spermatocyte; spermatid; embryo; pancreas; islet of Langerhans; hypothalamus; cerebral cortex; nucleus of brain; hippocampus proper; More reference expression data
BioGPS	n/a
Orthologs
Databases	NCBI: entry; OMA: entry
Species	Human	Mouse
Entrez	5535	19059
Ensembl	ENSG00000188386	ENSMUSG00000028310
UniProt	Q96LZ3	Q63811
RefSeq (mRNA)	NM_147180	NM_001004025
RefSeq (protein)	NP_671709	NP_001004025
Location (UCSC)	Chr 9: 101.59 – 101.6 Mb	Chr 4: 49.68 – 49.68 Mb
PubMed search
- Wikidata
View/Edit Human	View/Edit Mouse

Calcineurin subunit B type 2 is a protein that in humans is encoded by the PPP3R2 gene. Among its related pathways are MAPK signaling pathway and GPCR pathway. GO annotations related to this gene include calcium ion binding. An important paralog of this gene is CHP1.
