= NFAT =

Protein family

Nuclear factor of activated T-cells (NFAT) is a family of transcription factors shown to be important in immune response. One or more members of the NFAT family is expressed in most cells of the immune system. NFAT is also involved in the development of immune, cardiac, skeletal muscle, and nervous systems. NFAT was first discovered as an activator for the transcription of IL-2 in T cells (as a regulator of T cell immune response) but has since been found to play an important role in regulating many more body systems. NFAT transcription factors are involved in many normal body processes as well as in development of several diseases, such as inflammatory bowel diseases and several types of cancer. NFAT is also being investigated as a drug target for several different disorders.

== Family members ==
The NFAT transcription factor family consists of five members: NFATc1, NFATc2, NFATc3, NFATc4, and NFAT5. NFATc1 through NFATc4 are regulated by calcium signalling, and are known as the classical members of the NFAT family. NFAT5 is a more recently discovered member of the NFAT family that has special characteristics that differentiate it from other NFAT members.

Calcium signalling is critical to activation of NFATc1-4 because calmodulin (CaM), a well-known calcium sensor protein, activates the serine/threonine phosphatase calcineurin (CN). Activated CN binds to its binding site located in the N-terminal regulatory domain of NFATc1-4 and rapidly dephosphorylates the serine-rich region (SRR) and SP-repeats which are also present in the N-terminus of the NFAT proteins. This dephosphorylation results in a conformational change that exposes a nuclear localization signal which promotes nuclear translocation.

On the other hand, NFAT5 lacks a crucial part of the N-terminal regulatory domain which in the aforementioned group harbours the essential CN binding site. This makes NFAT5 activation completely independent of calcium signalling. It is, however, controlled by MAPK during osmotic stress. When a cell encounters a hypertonic environment NFAT5 is transported into the nucleus where it activates transcription of several osmoprotective genes. Therefore, it is expressed in the kidney medulla, skin and eyes but it can be also found in the thymus and activated lymphocytes.

== Structure ==
NFAT transcription factors consist of an intrinsically disordered regulatory N-terminus with the nuclear localization signal, serine-rich region and SP-repeats, a central Rel homology DNA-binding domain with an immunoglobulin-like fold that bind DNA either on its own or in a complex with transcription factor AP-1, and a C-terminal transactivation domain.

== Signalling and binding ==
=== Canonical signalling ===
Although phosphorylation and dephosphorylation are key for controlling NFAT function by masking and unmasking nuclear localization signals, as shown by the high number of phosphorylation sites in the NFAT regulatory domain, this dephosphorylation cannot occur without an influx of calcium ions.

The classical signalling relies on activation of phospholipase C (PLC) through different receptors like the T-cell receptor (TCR) (PLCG1) or B-cell receptor (BCR) (PLCG2). This activation leads to release of inositol-1,4,5-triphosphate (IP3) and diacylglycerol (DAG). The IP3 is especially important for calcium influx because it binds to a IP3 receptor located in the membrane of the endoplasmic reticulum (ER). This causes a short sharp increase in calcium concentration in cytosol as the ions leave the ER through the IP3 receptor. However, this is not enough to activate NFAT signalling. The release of calcium ions from ER is sensed by STIM proteins which are ER transmembrane proteins. Under normal circumstances the STIM proteins bind calcium ions but if most of them are released from ER the bound ions are released from the STIM proteins as well. This causes them to oligomerize and subsequently interact with ORAI1 which is an indispensable protein of CRAC complex. This complex serves as a channel which selectively allows the influx of calcium ions from outside of a cell. This phenomenon is called store-operated calcium entry (SOCE). Only this longer inflow of calcium ions is capable of fully activating NFAT through the CaM/CN mediated dephosphorylation as stated above.

=== Alternative signalling ===
Although SOCE is the main activation mechanism of most of the proteins of the NFAT family, they can also be activated by an alternative pathway. This pathway was until now proofed only for NFATc2. In this alternative activation SOCE is insignificant as shown by the fact that cyclosporine (CsA), which inhibits CN mediated dephosphorylation, does not abrogate this pathway. The reason for this is that it is activated through IL7R which leads to subsequent phosphorylation of single tyrosine in NFAT mediated by Jnk3 kinase a member of MAPK kinase subfamily.

=== DNA binding ===
Nuclear import of NFAT and its subsequent export is dependent on the calcium level inside of a cell. If the calcium level drops, the exporting kinases in a nucleus such as PKA, CK1 or GSK-3β rephosphorylate NFAT. This causes that NFAT reverts into its inactive state and is exported back to the cytosol where maintenance kinases finish the rephosphorylation in order to keep it in the inactivated state.

NFAT proteins have weak DNA-binding capacity. Therefore, to effectively bind DNA, NFAT proteins must cooperate with other nuclear resident transcription factors generically referred to as NFATn. This important feature of NFAT transcription factors enables integration and coincidence detection of calcium signals with other signalling pathways such as ras-MAPK or PKC. In addition, this signalling integration is involved in tissue-specific gene expression during development. A screen of ncRNA sequences identified in EST sequencing projects discovered a 'ncRNA repressor of the nuclear factor of activated T cells' called NRON.

NFAT-dependent promoters and enhancers tend to have 3-5 NFAT binding sites which indicates that higher order synergistic interactions between relevant proteins in a cooperative complex is needed for effective transcription. The best known class of these complexes is composed of NFAT and AP-1 or other bZIP proteins. This NFAT:AP-1 complex binds to the conventional Rel-family proteins DNA binding sites and is involved in gene transcription in immune cells.

== NFAT function in different cell types ==
=== T cells ===
T-cell receptor (TCR) stimulation causes the dephosphorylation of NFAT which in almost every kind of T cell then forms a complex with AP-1 (except in Tregs). This complex depending on the cytokine context then activates the key transcription factors of the distinct T cell subpopulations: T-bet for Th1, GATA3 for Th2, RORγ for Th17 and BATF for Tfh. T cells express almost all NFAT family members (except NFAT3). However, not every NFAT has the same significance for each subpopulation of T cells.

Upon TCR stimulation and after subsequent activation of T-bet under Th1 cytokine conditions, a complex which consists of the transcription factor T-bet and NFAT stimulates production of IFN-γ, the most prominent cytokine of Th1 cells. The TCR activation also triggers, through NFAT:AP-1 complex, production of NFAT2/αA which is a short isoform of NFATc2 which lacks the C-terminal domain and is fulfilling a role of an autoregulator because it further enhances the activation of all effector T cells. For Th1 response NFATc1 seems to be the most indispensable since knockout of NFATc1 in mice leads to extremely skewed Th2 response.

Under Th2 stimulating conditions GATA3 is activated. It subsequently also interacts with NFAT and triggers production of Th2 typical cytokines like IL-4, IL-5 and IL-13. NFATc2 seems to be the most important for Th2 mediated response since its impairment lowers the amount of the aforementioned cytokines and also decreases the amount of IgG1 and IgE. NFATc1 also plays an essential role as it forms a complex with GATA3 just like NFATc2. It further mediates the production of Th2 cytokines indirectly through regulation of CRTh2.

In line with Th1 and Th2 response, the stimulation of TCR under Th17 conditions elicits expression of RORγ. It subsequently binds to NFAT and stimulates the production of Th17 specific cytokines like IL-17A, IL-17F, IL-21, IL-22. In Th17 response probably NFATc2 plays a key role since mice with NFATc2 knockout show reduction in RORγ as well as in IL-17A, IL-17F, and IL-21.

Treg cells are the only exceptions to the NFAT:AP-1 complex formation since after their TCR stimulation NFAT binds to SMAD3 instead of AP-1. This complex then activates FOXP3 transcription, a master gene regulator in Tregs. NFAT:FOXP3 complex then regulates Treg specific cytokine production. There are two main populations of Treg cells: natural Treg (nTreg) cells which develop in Thymus and induced Treg (iTreg) cells which develop from naive CD4+ T cells in the periphery after their stimulation. iTreg cells seem to be highly dependent on NFATc1, 2 and 4 since deletion of any of these genes or their combination causes almost a complete loss of iTreg cells but not nTreg cells.

In Tfh cells just like in Th1, Th2 and Th17 cells NFAT:AP-1 complex is formed. This complex afterwards activates transcription of BATF which then also binds to NFAT and together with other proteins like IRF4 commences production of Tfh indispensable molecules: CXCR5, ICOS, Bcl6 and IL-21. Tfh cells express high levels of NFATc1 and especially NFATc2 and NFAT2/αA which suggest an important role of NFATc2. Deletion of NFATc2 in T cells facilitates an increased number of Tfh cells and higher germinal center response probably due to dysregulation of CXCR5 and decreased number of T follicular regulatory (Tfr) cells. Since Tfh are tightly connected with humoral response any defect in them will project into B cells. Therefore, it is not surprising that NFAT2 lymphocytes specific ablation causes a defect of the BCR-mediated proliferation but whether this phenotype is caused by sole dysregulation of Tfh or B cells or combination of both is uncertain.

=== B cells ===
Although discovered in T cells it is becoming more obvious that NFAT is also expressed in different cell types. In B cells mainly NFATc1 and after activation also NFATc2 and NFAT2/αA are expressed and fulfil important functions like antigen presentation, proliferation, and apoptosis. Although the impairment of NFAT pathway has serious consequences in T cells, in B cells they seem to be rather mild. If for instance a specific B cell knockout of both STIM proteins is carried out, SOCE is completely abolished and therefore NFAT signalling as well. Although in these knockout B cells the resulting humoral response is very similar to B cells with no knockout, the complete abolishment of NFAT also brought about a decrease in IL-10. However, some studies suggest a more important role of NFAT in B cells and therefore this topic is still not well understood and warrants further research.

=== T cell anergy and exhaustion ===
T cell anergy is induced by suboptimal stimulation conditions when for instance TCR is stimulated without appropriate costimulatory signals. Because of the missing co-stimulation AP-1 is absent and a NFAT:NFAT complex is formed. This complex activates anergy associated genes like E3 ubiquitin ligases (Cbl-b, ITCH, and GRAIL), diacylglycerol kinase α (DGKα), and caspase 3 which promote the induction of T-cell anergy. Similar to T cell anergy is T cell exhaustion which is also caused by impaired formation of the NFAT:AP-1 complex but the underlying induction of exhaustion state is through chronic stimulation rather than suboptimal stimulation. In both anergy and exhaustion NFATc1 seems to play a key role. Conversaly, NFATc2 together with NFAT2/αA are needed to revert the state of anergy or exhaustion.

== NFAT signalling in neural development ==
The Ca^{2+} dependent calcineurin/NFAT signalling pathway has been found to be important in neuronal growth and axon guidance during vertebrate development. Each different class of NFAT contributes to different steps in the neural development. NFAT works with neurotrophic signalling to regulate axon outgrowth in several neuronal populations. Additionally, NFAT transcription complexes integrate neuronal growth with guidance cues such as netrin to facilitate the formation of new synapses, helping to build neural circuits in the brain. NFAT is a known important player in both the developing and adult nervous system.

== Clinical significance ==
=== Inflammation ===
NFAT plays a role in the regulation of inflammation of inflammatory bowel disease (IBD). In the gene that encodes LRRK2 (leucine-rich repeat kinase 2), a susceptibility locus for IBD was found. The kinase LRRK2 is an inhibitor for the NFATc2 variety, so in mice lacking LRRK2, increased activation of NFATc2 was found in macrophages. This led to an increase in the NFAT-dependent cytokines that spark severe colitis attacks.

NFAT also plays a role in Rheumatoid Arthritis (RA), an autoimmune disease that has a strong pro-inflammatory component. TNF-α, a pro-inflammatory cytokine, activates the calcineurin-NFAT pathway in macrophages. Additionally, inhibiting the mTOR pathway decreases joint inflammation and erosion, so the known interaction between mTOR pathway and NFAT presents a key to the inflammatory process of RA.

== As a drug target ==
Due to its essential role in the production of the T cell proliferative cytokine IL-2, NFAT signalling is an important pharmacological target for the induction of immunosuppression. CN inhibitors, which prevent the activation of NFAT, including CsA and tacrolimus (FK506), are used in the treatment of rheumatoid arthritis, multiple sclerosis, Crohn's disease, and ulcerative colitis and to prevent the rejection of organ transplants. However, there is a toxicity associated with these drugs due to their ability to inhibit CN in non-immune cells, which limits their use in other situations that may call for immunosuppressing drug therapy, including allergy and inflammation. There are other compounds that target NFAT directly, as opposed to targeting the phosphatase activity of calcineurin, that may have broad immunosuppressive effects but lack the toxicity of CsA and FK506. Because individual NFAT proteins exist in specific cell types or affect specific genes, it may be possible to inhibit individual NFAT protein functions for an even more selective immune effect.
