= NFATC1 =

Protein-coding gene in the species Homo sapiens

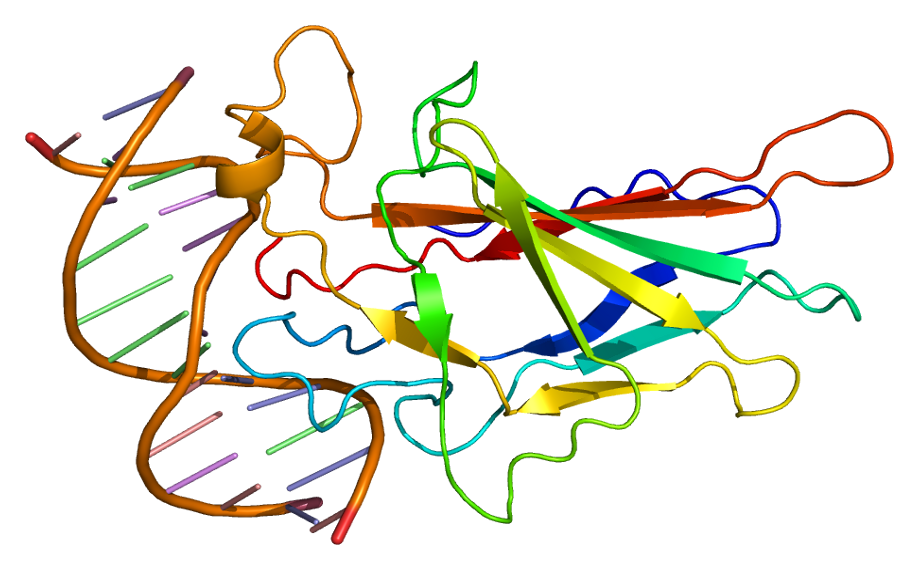

Identifiers
- Aliases: NFATC1, NF-ATC, NFAT2, NFATc, NF-ATc1.2, nuclear factor of activated T-cells 1, nuclear factor of activated T cells 1
- External IDs: OMIM: 600489; MGI: 102469; GeneCards: NFATC1
Available structures
PDB	Ortholog search: PDBe RCSB
PDB	List of PDB id codes 1A66, 1NFA

Gene location (Human)
Chr.	Chromosome 18 (human)
Band	18q23	Start	79,395,856 bp
Band	18q23	End	79,529,325 bp

Gene location (Mouse)
Chr.	Chromosome 18 (mouse)
Band	18 E3|18 53.66 cM	Start	80,649,420 bp
Band	18 E3|18 53.66 cM	End	80,756,286 bp
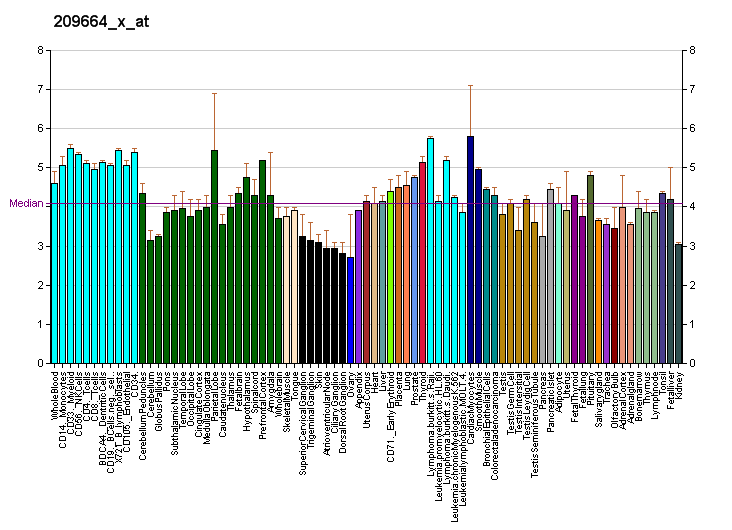
RNA expression pattern
Bgee	Human / Mouse (ortholog); Top expressed in: oocyte; muscle of thigh; secondary oocyte; Skeletal muscle tissue of rectus abdominis; triceps brachii muscle; gastrocnemius muscle; Skeletal muscle tissue of biceps brachii; sural nerve; glutes; vastus lateralis muscle / Top expressed in: granulocyte; mesenteric lymph nodes; endocardial cushion; triceps brachii muscle; muscle of thigh; olfactory epithelium; knee joint; temporal muscle; blood; ankle; More reference expression data
BioGPS	More reference expression data
Gene ontology
Molecular function	RNA polymerase II cis-regulatory region sequence-specific DNA binding; DNA binding; RNA polymerase II transcription regulatory region sequence-specific DNA binding; DNA-binding transcription factor activity; mitogen-activated protein kinase p38 binding; FK506 binding; DNA-binding transcription activator activity, RNA polymerase II-specific; protein binding; transcription factor activity, RNA polymerase II distal enhancer sequence-specific binding; DNA-binding transcription factor activity, RNA polymerase II-specific; chromatin binding; transcription factor binding
Cellular component	cytoplasm; cytosol; nucleus; nucleoplasm; nuclear body; transcription regulator complex
Biological process	intracellular signal transduction; regulation of transcription, DNA-templated; calcineurin-NFAT signaling cascade; transcription by RNA polymerase II; transcription, DNA-templated; positive regulation of transcription, DNA-templated; Fc-epsilon receptor signaling pathway; positive regulation of transcription by RNA polymerase II; Wnt signaling pathway, calcium modulating pathway; negative regulation of Wnt signaling pathway; negative regulation of vascular associated smooth muscle cell differentiation; cytokine production; aortic valve morphogenesis; pulmonary valve morphogenesis
Sources:Amigo / QuickGO
Orthologs
Databases	NCBI: entry; OMA: entry
Species	Human	Mouse
Entrez	4772	18018
Ensembl	ENSG00000131196	ENSMUSG00000033016
UniProt	O95644	O88942
RefSeq (mRNA)	NM_172390; NM_001278669; NM_001278670; NM_001278672; NM_001278673 NM_001278675; NM_006162; NM_172387; NM_172388; NM_172389	NM_001164109; NM_001164110; NM_001164111; NM_001164112; NM_016791 NM_198429
RefSeq (protein)	NP_001265598; NP_001265599; NP_001265601; NP_001265602; NP_001265604 NP_006153; NP_765975; NP_765976; NP_765977; NP_765978	n/a
Location (UCSC)	Chr 18: 79.4 – 79.53 Mb	Chr 18: 80.65 – 80.76 Mb
PubMed search
- Wikidata
View/Edit Human	View/Edit Mouse

Nuclear factor of activated T-cells, cytoplasmic 1 is a protein that in humans is encoded by the NFATC1 gene.

== Function ==
The product of this gene is a component of the nuclear factor of activated T cells DNA-binding transcription complex. This complex consists of at least two components: a preexisting cytosolic component that translocates to the nucleus upon T cell receptor (TCR) stimulation, and an inducible nuclear component. Proteins belonging to this family of transcription factors play a central role in inducible gene transcription during immune response. The product of this gene is an inducible nuclear component. It functions as a major molecular target for the immunosuppressive drugs such as ciclosporin. Five transcript variants encoding distinct isoforms have been identified for this gene. Different isoforms of this protein may regulate inducible expression of different cytokine genes.

== Interactions ==
NFATC1 has been shown to interact with PIM1.

== See also ==
- NFAT
