= Prolyl 3-hydroxylase 2 =

P3H2

Identifiers
- Aliases: P3H2, MCVD, MLAT4, LEPREL1, prolyl 3-hydroxylase 2
- External IDs: OMIM: 610341; MGI: 2146663; GeneCards: P3H2
Enzyme activity
EC #	BRENDA	ExPASy	KEGG	MetaCyc
1.14.11.7	↗	↗	↗	↗

Gene location (Human)
Chr.	Chromosome 3 (human)
Band	3q28	Start	189,956,728 bp
Band	3q28	End	190,122,437 bp

Gene location (Mouse)
Chr.	Chromosome 16 (mouse)
Band	16|16 B1	Start	25,778,038 bp
Band	16|16 B1	End	25,924,534 bp
RNA expression pattern
Bgee	Human / Mouse (ortholog); Top expressed in: cartilage tissue; metanephric glomerulus; tibia; left adrenal gland; spleen; left adrenal cortex; ventricular zone; right adrenal cortex; human kidney; decidua / Top expressed in: right kidney; renal corpuscle; human kidney; glomerulus; ankle; lip; lens; yolk sac; genital tubercle; cornea; More reference expression data
BioGPS	n/a
Gene ontology
Molecular function	iron ion binding; L-ascorbic acid binding; oxidoreductase activity; dioxygenase activity; oxidoreductase activity, acting on paired donors, with incorporation or reduction of molecular oxygen; metal ion binding; procollagen-proline 3-dioxygenase activity
Cellular component	basement membrane; Golgi apparatus; endoplasmic reticulum lumen; endoplasmic reticulum; sarcoplasmic reticulum
Biological process	collagen metabolic process; peptidyl-proline hydroxylation; negative regulation of cell population proliferation
Sources:Amigo / QuickGO
Orthologs
Databases	NCBI: entry; OMA: entry
Species	Human	Mouse
Entrez	55214	210530
Ensembl	ENSG00000090530	ENSMUSG00000038168
UniProt	Q8IVL5	Q8CG71
RefSeq (mRNA)	NM_001134418; NM_018192	NM_173379
RefSeq (protein)	NP_001127890; NP_060662	NP_775555
Location (UCSC)	Chr 3: 189.96 – 190.12 Mb	Chr 16: 25.78 – 25.92 Mb
PubMed search
- Wikidata
View/Edit Human	View/Edit Mouse

Prolyl 3-hydroxylase 2 is an enzyme that in humans is encoded by the gene P3H2 (formally LEPREL1). This enzyme is involved in the assembly of collagen. Pathogenic mutations in the gene are associated with severe nearsightedness (myopia) and cataracts.

== Function ==
As their names suggests, the Prolyl 3-hydroxylase 2 and its relatives Prolyl 3-hydroxylase 1 and 3 function as collagen prolyl 3-hydroxylases. This means they act on the amino acid, proline, located in collagen precursor proteins, and attach a hydroxyl at the 3-position, converting the proline into 3-hydroxyproline. This seems to function to help the corresponding collagen fibrils bind together and align properly.

P3H2 differs from P3H1 in a number of important ways. It is primarily expressed in basement membrane-rich tissues (P3H1 is primarily in fibrillar collagens rich tissues). It is also able to act on type IV collagen (especially COL4A1), unlike P3H1. Both enzymes are able to act on Type I collagen (and COL1A1), but they tend to modify the prolines at different positions. P3H2 also appears to function on its own, while P3H1 forms a complex with two other proteins (CRTAP and CypB).
