= L-proline,2-oxoglutarate:oxygen oxidoreductase =

L-proline,2-oxoglutarate:oxygen oxidoreductase may refer to:

- Procollagen-proline 3-dioxygenase
- Procollagen-proline dioxygenase
- Proline 3-hydroxylase
