= Rencofilstat =

Chemical compound

Clinical data
- Other names: CRV431

Identifiers
- IUPAC name: N-[(7R,8R)-8-[(2S,5S,8R,11S,14S,17S,20S,23R,26S,29S,32S)-5-ethyl-1,7,8,10,16,20,23,25,28,31-decamethyl-11,17,26,29-tetrakis(2-methylpropyl)-3,6,9,12,15,18,21,24,27,30,33-undecaoxo-14,32-di(propan-2-yl)-1,4,7,10,13,16,19,22,25,28,31-undecazacyclotritriacont-2-yl]-8-hydroxy-7-methyloctyl]acetamide
- CAS Number: 1383420-08-3
- PubChem CID: 134812041
- ChemSpider: 81368207
- UNII: M3H4D91AY5
- ChEMBL: ChEMBL4297487

Chemical and physical data
- Formula: C_{67}H_{122}N_{12}O_{13}
- Molar mass: 1303.784 g·mol^{−1}
- 3D model (JSmol): Interactive image
- SMILES: CC[C@H]1C(=O)N([C@@H](C(=O)N([C@H](C(=O)N[C@H](C(=O)N([C@H](C(=O)N[C@H](C(=O)N[C@@H](C(=O)N([C@H](C(=O)N([C@H](C(=O)N([C@H](C(=O)N([C@H](C(=O)N1)[C@@H]([C@H](C)CCCCCCNC(=O)C)O)C)C(C)C)C)CC(C)C)C)CC(C)C)C)C)C)CC(C)C)C)C(C)C)CC(C)C)C)C)C
- InChI: InChI=1S/C67H122N12O13/c1-26-48-63(88)73(19)46(17)62(87)74(20)50(34-38(4)5)59(84)72-53(41(10)11)66(91)75(21)49(33-37(2)3)58(83)69-44(15)57(82)70-45(16)61(86)76(22)51(35-39(6)7)64(89)77(23)52(36-40(8)9)65(90)78(24)54(42(12)13)67(92)79(25)55(60(85)71-48)56(81)43(14)31-29-27-28-30-32-68-47(18)80/h37-46,48-56,81H,26-36H2,1-25H3,(H,68,80)(H,69,83)(H,70,82)(H,71,85)(H,72,84)/t43-,44+,45-,46-,48+,49+,50+,51+,52+,53+,54+,55+,56-/m1/s1; Key:KBARHGHBFILILC-NGIJKBHDSA-N

Rencofilstat (CRV431) is a pan-cyclophilin inhibitor and analog of cyclosporine A developed for nonalcoholic steatohepatitis and hepatocellular carcinoma.
