= Cyclophilin =

Cyclophilin type peptidyl-prolyl cis-trans isomerase/CLD
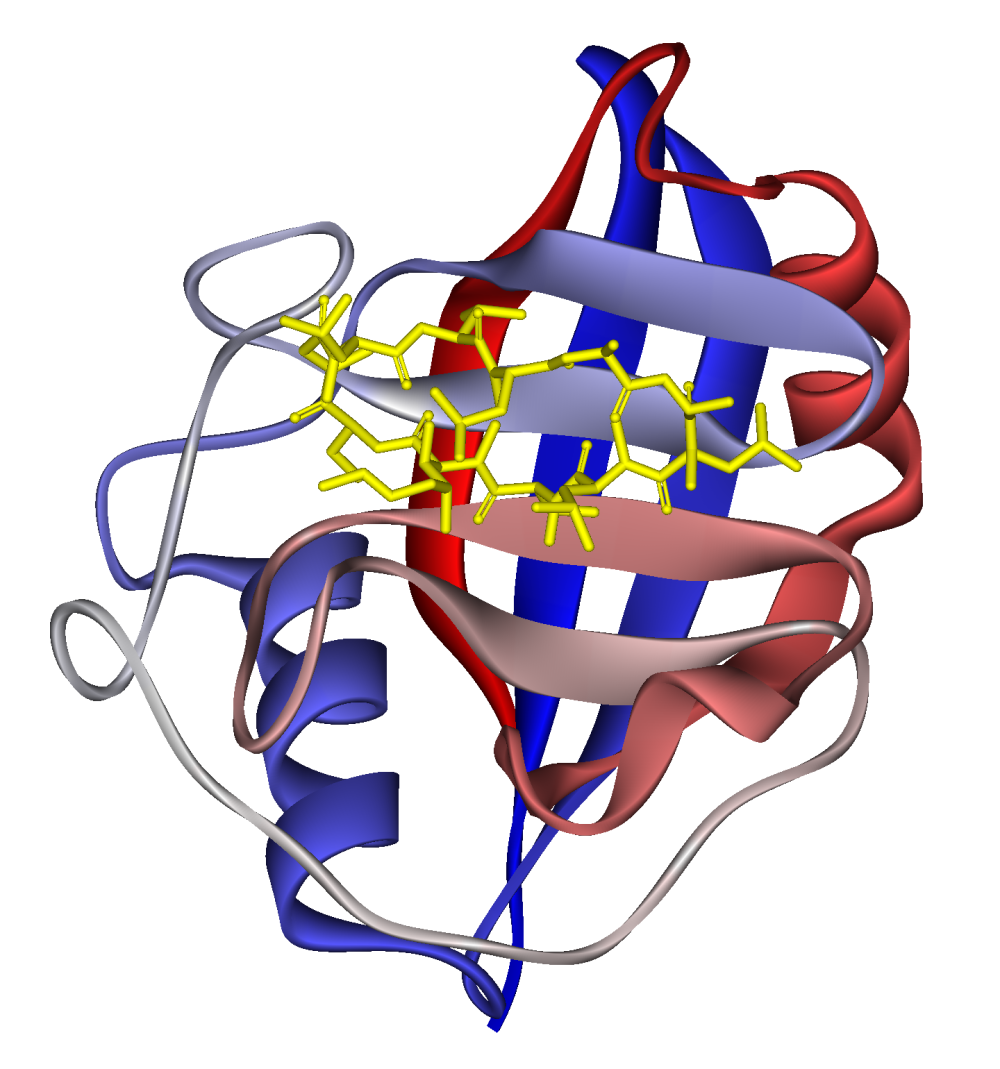
- Ribbon diagram of cyclophilin A in complex with ciclosporin (yellow). From PDB: 1CWA.

Identifiers
- Symbol: Pro_isomerase
- Pfam: PF00160
- Pfam clan: CL0475
- InterPro: IPR002130
- PROSITE: PDOC00154
- SCOP2: 1cyh / SCOPe / SUPFAM
Available protein structures:
- PDB: IPR002130 PF00160 (ECOD; PDBsum)
- AlphaFold: IPR002130; PF00160

Cyclophilins (CYPs) are a family of proteins named after their ability to bind to ciclosporin (cyclosporin A), an immunosuppressant which is usually used to suppress rejection after internal organ transplants. They are found in all domains of life. These proteins have peptidyl prolyl isomerase activity, which catalyzes the isomerization of peptide bonds from trans form to cis form at proline residues and facilitates protein folding.

Cyclophilin A is a cytosolic and highly abundant protein. The protein belongs to a family of isozymes, including cyclophilins B and C, and natural killer cell cyclophilin-related protein. Major isoforms have been found within single cells, including inside the Endoplasmic reticulum, and some are even secreted.

== Mammalian cyclophilins ==
Human genes encoding proteins containing the cyclophilin domain include:

- PPIA, PPIB, PPIC, PPID, PPIE, PPIF, PPIG, PPIH
- PPIL1, PPIL2, PPIL3, PPIL4, PPIAL4, PPIL6
- PPWD1

=== Cyclophilin A ===
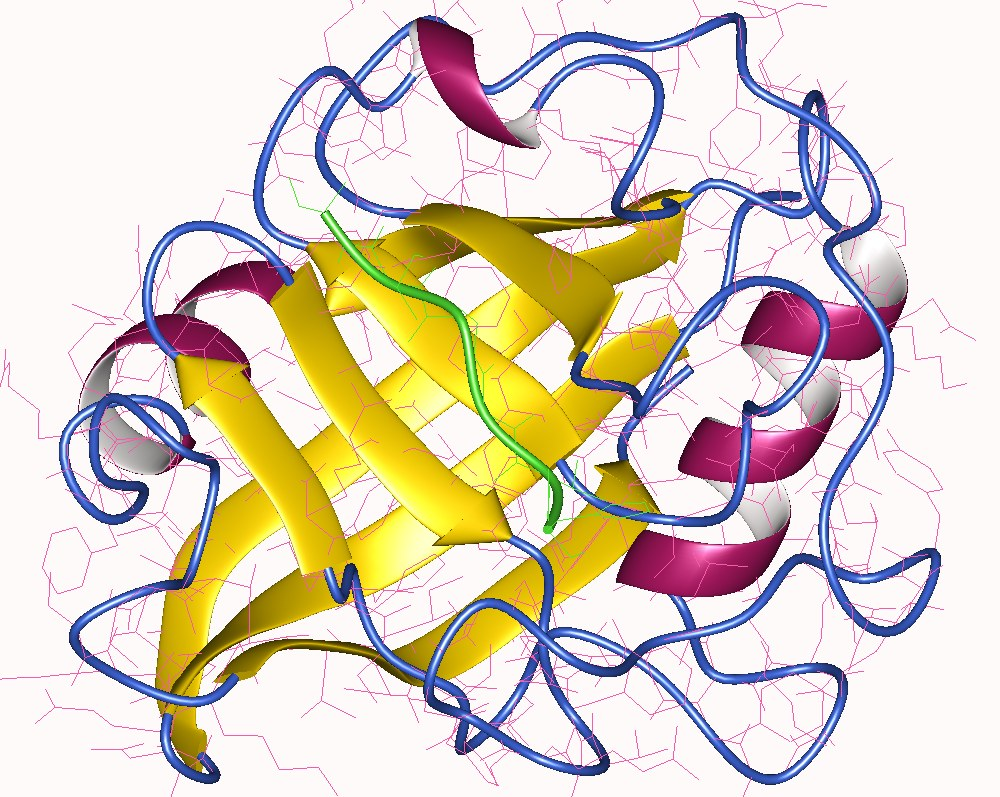
Cyclophilin A + HIV peptid (green), Human.

Cyclophilin A (CYPA) also known as peptidylprolyl isomerase A (PPIA), which is found in the cytosol, has a beta barrel structure with two alpha helices and a beta-sheet. Other cyclophilins have similar structures to cyclophilin A. The cyclosporin-cyclophilin A complex inhibits a calcium/calmodulin-dependent phosphatase, calcineurin, the inhibition of which is thought to suppress organ rejection by halting the production of the pro-inflammatory molecules TNF alpha and interleukin 2.

Cyclophilin A is also known to be recruited by the Gag polyprotein during HIV-1 virus infection, and its incorporation into new virus particles is essential for HIV-1 infectivity.

=== Cyclophilin D ===
Cyclophilin D (PPIF, note that literature is confusing, the mitochondrial cyclophilin is encoded by the PPIF gene), which is located in the matrix of mitochondria, is only a modulatory, but may or may not be a structural component of the mitochondrial permeability transition pore. The pore opening raises the permeability of the mitochondrial inner membrane, allows influx of cytosolic molecules into the mitochondrial matrix, increases the matrix volume, and disrupts the mitochondrial outer membrane. As a result, the mitochondria fall into a functional disorder, so the opening of the pore plays an important role in cell death. Cyclophilin D is thought to regulate the opening of the pore because cyclosporin A, which binds to CyP-D, inhibits the pore opening.

However, mitochondria obtained from the cysts of Artemia franciscana, do not exhibit the mitochondrial permeability transition pore

== Clinical significance ==
=== Diseases ===
Overexpression of Cyclophilin A has been linked to poor response to inflammatory diseases, the progression or metastasis of cancer, and aging.

=== Cyclophilins as drug targets ===
Cyclophilin inhibitors, such as cyclosporin, are being developed to treat neurodegenerative diseases. Cyclophilin inhibition may also be a therapy for liver diseases. A review from 2024 discussed cyclophilins as conserved and relevant for protein folding and cellular signaling. The review summarized the involvement of Cyps in viral replication and cancer progression. Specifically, CypA is mentioned for its key role in the replication of human pathogens such as HIV-1. Cyp inhibition is promising for reducing infectivity of viruses and as a tumor suppressor.
