= PPIE =

PPIE may refer to:

- PPIE (gene)
- Panama–Pacific International Exposition, 1915 world's fair in California
