= Procollagen-proline 3-dioxygenase =

Identifiers
- EC no.: 1.14.11.7
- CAS no.: 63551-75-7

Databases
- BRENDA: enzyme data
- ExPASy: NiceZyme view
- KEGG: enzyme entry
- MetaCyc: metabolic pathway
- Rhea: reactions
- PDB structures: RCSB PDB PDBe PDBsum
- Gene Ontology: AmiGO / QuickGO
Search
- PMC: articles
- PubMed: articles
- NCBI: proteins

Procollagen-proline 3-dioxygenase (EC 1.14.11.7) is an enzyme that catalyzes the chemical reaction

L-proline
Fe(IV)=O
Fe(II)
3-hydroxyproline

In humans, it is encoded by the genes P3H1, P3H2, and P3H3 (but not the related gene P3H4). The enzyme is a member of the alpha-ketoglutarate-dependent hydroxylase superfamily. It converts L-proline amino acids incorporated in a peptide, typically collagen, to trans-3-hydroxyproline equivalents.

The enzyme is an oxidase with the systematic name procollagen-L-proline,2-oxoglutarate:oxygen oxidoreductase (3-hydroxylating). Other names in common use include proline,2-oxoglutarate 3-dioxygenase, prolyl 3-hydroxylase, protocollagen proline 3-hydroxylase, and oxidoreductase, 3-hydroxylating. It uses molecular oxygen as oxidant, with incorporation of one of its atoms. The enzyme is a non-heme iron protein with ferryl active site where Fe(IV)=O is the species that transfers its oxygen to the substrate.

The mechanism requires 2-oxoglutaric acid to activate the iron oxygen complex, and this gives succinic acid and carbon dioxide when the second atom of the molecular oxygen is removed. Ascorbic acid is also required to enhance the turnover number of the enzyme and its lack can cause scurvy because collagen biosynthesis is not complete.

2-oxoglutaric acid
[O]
CO_{2}
succinic acid

== See also ==
- Procollagen-proline dioxygenase which acts in a similar way but gives 4-hydroxyproline as product
