= PPIB =

Protein-coding gene in the species Homo sapiens

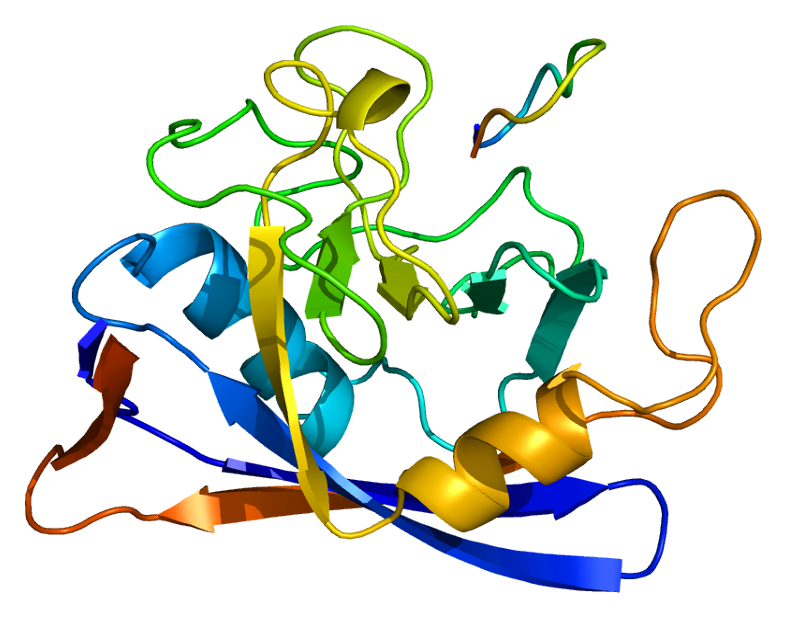

Identifiers
- Aliases: PPIB, CYP-S1, CYPB, HEL-S-39, OI9, SCYLP, peptidylprolyl isomerase B, B
- External IDs: OMIM: 123841; MGI: 97750; GeneCards: PPIB
Available structures
| PDB | Ortholog search: PDBe RCSB |
| PDB | List of PDB id codes 1CYN, 3ICH, 3ICI |
Enzyme activity
| EC # | BRENDA | ExPASy | KEGG | MetaCyc |
|---|---|---|---|---|
| 5.2.1.8 | ↗ | ↗ | ↗ | ↗ |

Gene location (Human)
| Chr. | Chromosome 15 (human) |
| Band | 15q22.31 | Start | 64,155,740 bp |
| Band | 15q22.31 | End | 64,163,134 bp |

Gene location (Mouse)
| Chr. | Chromosome 9 (mouse) |
| Band | 9|9 C | Start | 65,967,504 bp |
| Band | 9|9 C | End | 65,973,905 bp |
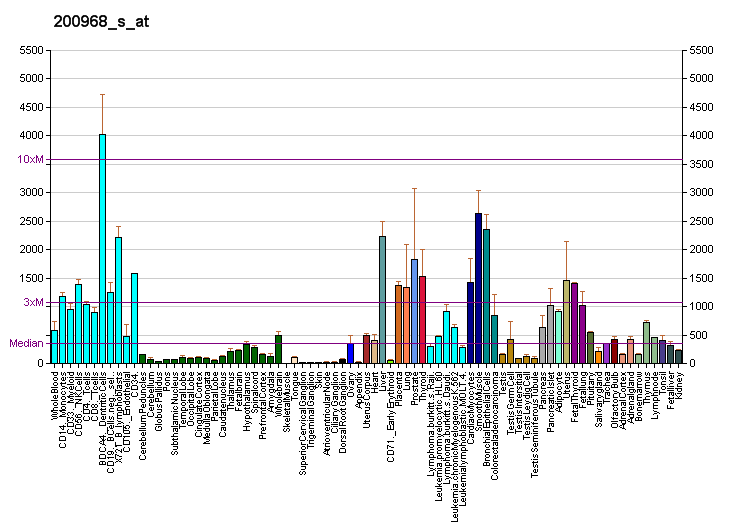

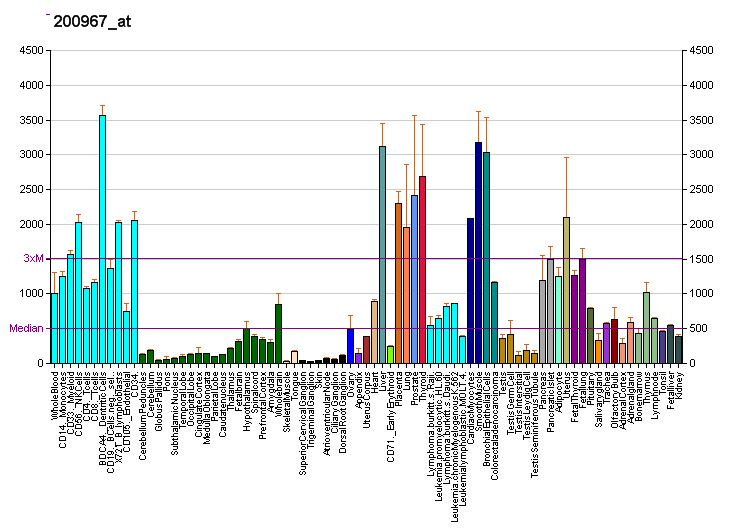
RNA expression pattern
| Bgee | Human / Mouse (ortholog); Top expressed in: stromal cell of endometrium; corpus epididymis; caput epididymis; right lobe of thyroid gland; anterior pituitary; seminal vesicula; left lobe of thyroid gland; parotid gland; tail of epididymis; pericardium / Top expressed in: external carotid artery; internal carotid artery; vestibular sensory epithelium; fossa; vas deferens; condyle; endothelial cell of lymphatic vessel; Paneth cell; utricle; efferent ductule; More reference expression data |
| BioGPS | More reference expression data |
Gene ontology
| Molecular function | collagen binding; unfolded protein binding; protein-containing complex binding; isomerase activity; protein binding; RNA polymerase binding; RNA binding; peptidyl-prolyl cis-trans isomerase activity; cyclosporin A binding |
| Cellular component | protein-containing complex; endoplasmic reticulum lumen; membrane; focal adhesion; melanosome; smooth endoplasmic reticulum; endoplasmic reticulum chaperone complex; endoplasmic reticulum; perinuclear region of cytoplasm; extracellular exosome; nucleus |
| Biological process | protein stabilization; regulation of post-translational protein modification; protein peptidyl-prolyl isomerization; positive regulation by host of viral genome replication; positive regulation by host of viral process; protein folding; positive regulation of multicellular organism growth; bone development; chaperone-mediated protein folding; protein refolding |
Sources:Amigo / QuickGO
Orthologs
| Databases | NCBI: entry; OMA: entry |
| Species | Human | Mouse |
| Entrez | 5479 | 19035 |
| Ensembl | ENSG00000166794 | ENSMUSG00000032383 |
| UniProt | P23284 | P24369 |
| RefSeq (mRNA) | NM_000942 | NM_011149 |
| RefSeq (protein) | NP_000933 | NP_035279 |
| Location (UCSC) | Chr 15: 64.16 – 64.16 Mb | Chr 9: 65.97 – 65.97 Mb |
| PubMed search |
- Wikidata
| View/Edit Human | View/Edit Mouse |

Peptidyl-prolyl cis-trans isomerase B is an enzyme that is encoded by the PPIB gene. As a member of the peptidyl-prolyl cis-trans isomerase (PPIase) family, this protein catalyzes the cis-trans isomerization of proline imidic peptide bonds, which allows it to regulate protein folding of type I collagen. Generally, PPIases are found in all eubacteria and eukaryotes, as well as in a few archaebacteria, and thus are highly conserved.

== Structure ==
Like other cyclophilins, PPIB forms a β-barrel structure with a hydrophobic core. This β-barrel is composed of eight anti-parallel β-strands and capped by two α-helices at the top and bottom. In addition, the β-turns and loops in the strands contribute to the flexibility of the barrel. In particular, PPIB is a 21 kDa protein which contains a C-terminal ER retention motif that directs the protein to the ER organelle, while its N-terminal extension attaches it to its substrates.

== Function ==
PPIB is a member of the peptidyl-prolyl cis-trans isomerase (PPIase) family. PPIases catalyze the cis-trans isomerization of proline imidic peptide bonds and regulate protein folding and maturation. Proline is the only amino acid known to exist in both the cis and trans isomerization rate in vivo, and is often the rate-limiting step in protein refolding. The PPIase family is further divided into three structurally distinct subfamilies: cyclophilin (CyP), FK506-binding protein (FKBP), and parvulin (Pvn). While each family demonstrates PPIase activity, the families have no sequence of structural similarities. As a cyclophilin, PPIB binds cyclosporin A (CsA) and can be found within the cell or secreted by the cell.

== Human PPIB ==
PPIB is the second of 18 cyclophilins to be identified in humans, after CypA. PPIB localizes to the endoplasmic reticulum (ER) and participates in many biological processes, including mitochondrial metabolism, apoptosis, redox, and inflammation, as well as in related diseases and conditions, such as ischemic reperfusion injury, AIDS, and cancer. It is also associated with viral infections. In eukaryotes, cyclophilins localize ubiquitously to many cell and tissue types. In addition to PPIase and protein chaperone activities, cyclophilins function in mitochondrial metabolism, apoptosis, immunological response, inflammation, and cell growth and proliferation. Along with PPIC, PPIB localizes to the endoplasmic reticulum (ER), where it maintains redox homeostasis. Depletion of these two cyclophilins leads to hyperoxidation of the ER.

In the ER, PPIB interacts with proteins such as P3H1, CRTAP, BiP, GRP94, PDI, and calreticulin to form foldase and chaperone complexes and facilitate protein folding, especially for type I collagen. This protein is the major PPIase for type I collagen, since the collagen contains an abundance of prolines that require cis-trans isomerization for proper folding. Thus, PPIB is essential for collagen biosynthesis and post-translational modification and affects fibril assembly, matrix cross-linking, and bone mineralization.

In addition, it is associated with the secretory pathway and released in biological fluids. This protein can bind to cells derived from T- and B-lymphocytes, and may regulate cyclosporine A-mediated immunosuppression. In one experiment, the addition of PPIB into cell cultures in vitro induced chemotaxis and integrin-mediated adhesion of T cells to the extracellular matrix (ECM), suggesting that it might function in innate immunity by recruiting T cells into infected tissue in vivo.

== Clinical significance ==
As a cyclophilin, PPIB binds the immunosuppressive drug CsA to form a CsA-cyclophilin complex, which then targets calcineurin to inhibit the signaling pathway for T-cell activation.

In cardiac myogenic cells, cyclophilins have been observed to be activated by heat shock and hypoxia-reoxygenation as well as complex with heat shock proteins. Thus, cyclophilins may function in cardioprotection during ischemia-reperfusion injury.

PPIB contributes to the replication and infection of viruses causing diseases such as AIDS, hepatitis C, measles, and influenza A. Thus, therapeutic targeting of PPIB with selective inhibitors may prove effective in combating viral infections and inflammation. Currently, PPIB is employed as a biomarker for various types of cancer. Moreover, there are two antigenic epitopes (CypB84-92 and CypB91-99) recognized by HLA-A24-restricted and tumor-specific cytotoxic T lymphocytes which could be used as cancer vaccines, and in fact, were used to treat lung cancer in a clinical trial.

== Bacterial PPIB ==
PPIB has been identified in both Gram-negative bacteria and Gram-positive bacteria as an intracellular protein. In Escherichia coli, PPIB has been shown to have both PPIase activity and Chaperone (protein) activity. In Staphylococcus aureus, PPIB has been shown to have PPIase activity, and to directly assist in the refolding of Staphylococcal nuclease. Aside from these bacteria, PPIB has been identified in Brucella abortus, Mycobacterium tuberculosis, Bacillus subtilis and other bacteria.

== Interactions ==
PPIB has been shown to interact with:

- Apolipoprotein B.
- P3H1,
- CRTAP,
- BiP,
- GRP94,
- PDI, and
- calreticulin.
