= PPIL1 =

Protein-coding gene in the species Homo sapiens

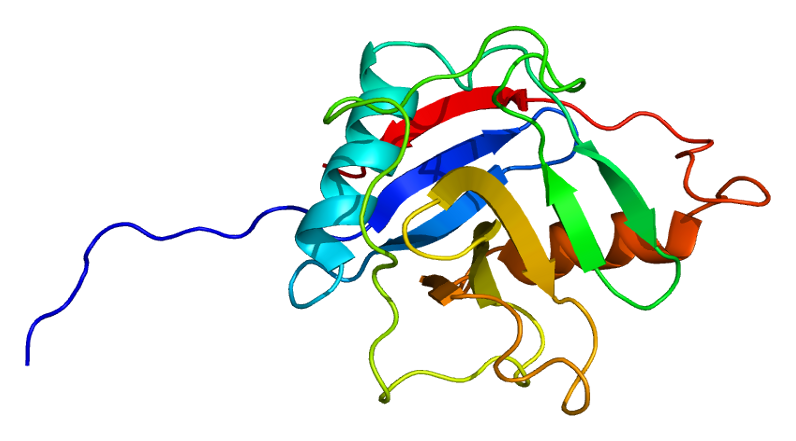

Identifiers
- Aliases: PPIL1, CYPL1, PPIase, hCyPX, CGI-124, peptidylprolyl isomerase like 1, PCH14
- External IDs: OMIM: 601301; MGI: 1916066; GeneCards: PPIL1
Available structures
PDB	Ortholog search: PDBe RCSB
PDB	List of PDB id codes 1XWN, 2K7N, 2X7K
Enzyme activity
EC #	BRENDA	ExPASy	KEGG	MetaCyc
5.2.1.8	↗	↗	↗	↗

Gene location (Human)
Chr.	Chromosome 6 (human)
Band	6p21.2	Start	36,854,827 bp
Band	6p21.2	End	36,874,803 bp

Gene location (Mouse)
Chr.	Chromosome 17 (mouse)
Band	17|17 A3.3	Start	29,469,777 bp
Band	17|17 A3.3	End	29,483,160 bp
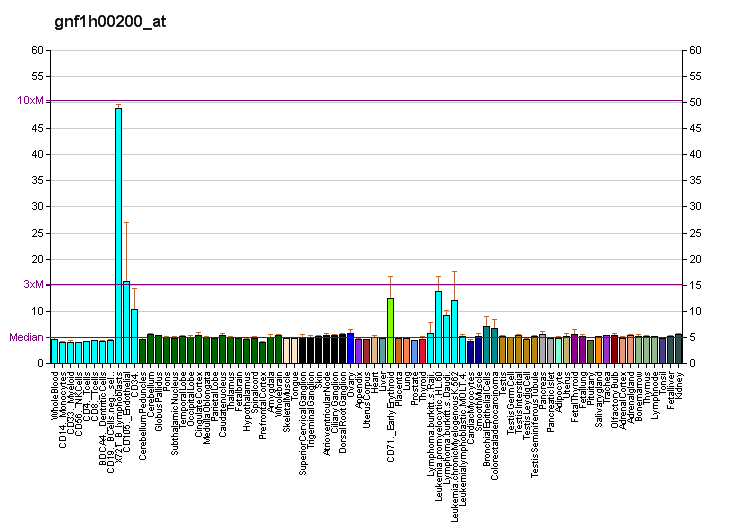
RNA expression pattern
Bgee	Human / Mouse (ortholog); Top expressed in: right ventricle; myocardium of left ventricle; oocyte; gonad; cardiac muscle tissue of right atrium; secondary oocyte; right auricle of heart; right adrenal cortex; left adrenal gland; left adrenal cortex / Top expressed in: embryo; ventricular zone; superior cervical ganglion; morula; embryo; neural tube; blastocyst; epiblast; yolk sac; genital tubercle; More reference expression data
BioGPS	More reference expression data
Gene ontology
Molecular function	isomerase activity; protein binding; disordered domain specific binding; peptidyl-prolyl cis-trans isomerase activity; cyclosporin A binding
Cellular component	catalytic step 2 spliceosome; spliceosomal complex; nucleoplasm; nucleus; U2-type catalytic step 2 spliceosome
Biological process	mRNA processing; protein folding; RNA splicing; mRNA splicing, via spliceosome; protein peptidyl-prolyl isomerization
Sources:Amigo / QuickGO
Orthologs
Databases	NCBI: entry; OMA: entry
Species	Human	Mouse
Entrez	51645	68816
Ensembl	ENSG00000137168	ENSMUSG00000024007
UniProt	Q9Y3C6	Q9D0W5
RefSeq (mRNA)	NM_016059	NM_026845
RefSeq (protein)	NP_057143	NP_081121
Location (UCSC)	Chr 6: 36.85 – 36.87 Mb	Chr 17: 29.47 – 29.48 Mb
PubMed search
- Wikidata
View/Edit Human	View/Edit Mouse

Peptidyl-prolyl cis-trans isomerase-like 1 is an enzyme that in humans is encoded by the PPIL1 gene.

This gene is a member of the cyclophilin family of peptidylprolyl isomerases (PPIases). The cyclophilins are a highly conserved, ubiquitous family, members of which play an important role in protein folding, immunosuppression by cyclosporin A, and infection of HIV-1 virions.

Based on similarity to other PPIases, this protein could accelerate the folding of proteins and might catalyze the cis-trans isomerization of proline imidic peptide bonds in oligopeptides.
