= PPIE (gene) =

Protein-coding gene in humans

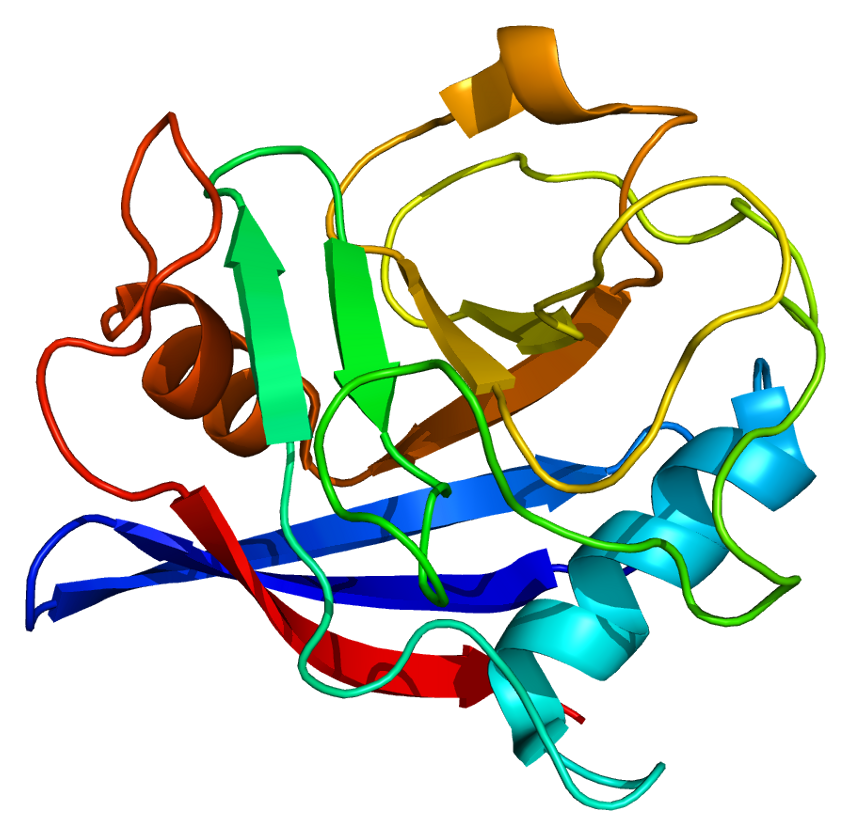

Identifiers
- Aliases: PPIE, CYP-33, CYP33, peptidylprolyl isomerase E
- External IDs: OMIM: 602435; MGI: 1917118; GeneCards: PPIE
Available structures
| PDB | Ortholog search: PDBe RCSB |
| PDB | List of PDB id codes 1ZMF, 2CQB, 2KU7, 2KYX, 2R99, 3LPY, 3MDF, 3UCH |
Enzyme activity
| EC # | BRENDA | ExPASy | KEGG | MetaCyc |
|---|---|---|---|---|
| 5.2.1.8 | ↗ | ↗ | ↗ | ↗ |

Gene location (Human)
| Chr. | Chromosome 1 (human) |
| Band | 1p34.2 | Start | 39,692,182 bp |
| Band | 1p34.2 | End | 39,763,914 bp |

Gene location (Mouse)
| Chr. | Chromosome 4 (mouse) |
| Band | 4|4 D2.2 | Start | 123,020,908 bp |
| Band | 4|4 D2.2 | End | 123,033,744 bp |
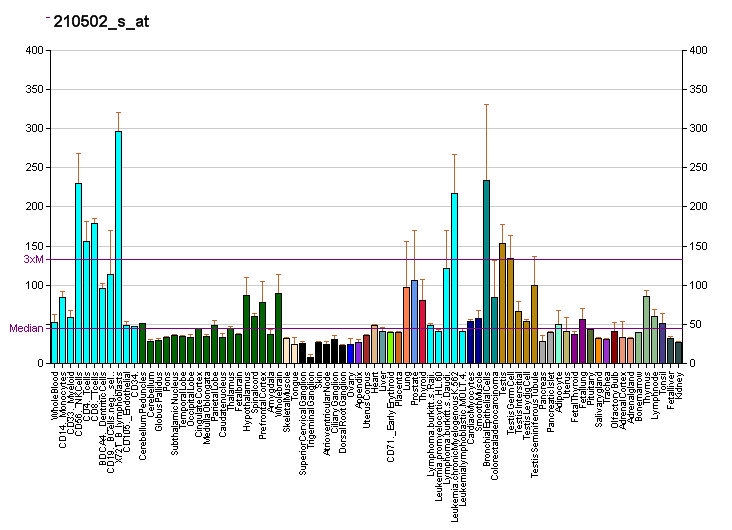

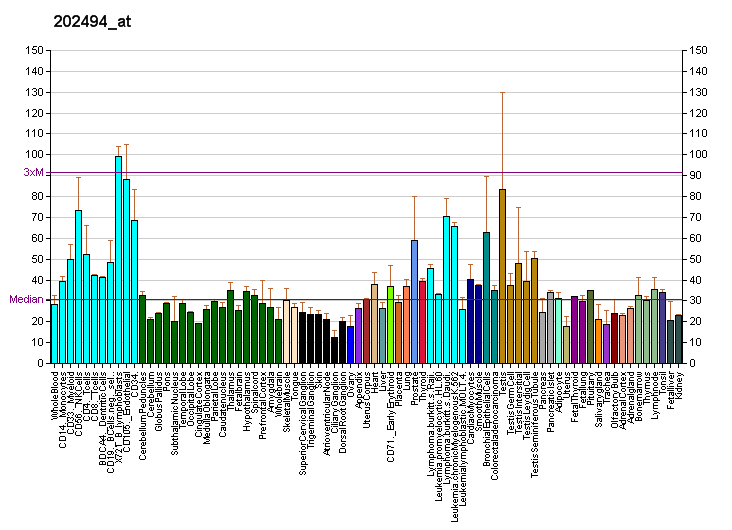
RNA expression pattern
| Bgee | Human / Mouse (ortholog); Top expressed in: left testis; right uterine tube; right testis; body of pancreas; granulocyte; Descending thoracic aorta; islet of Langerhans; muscle layer of sigmoid colon; popliteal artery; tibial arteries / Top expressed in: blastocyst; ventricular zone; morula; embryo; yolk sac; embryo; neural layer of retina; epiblast; otic placode; primitive streak; More reference expression data |
| BioGPS | More reference expression data |
Gene ontology
| Molecular function | isomerase activity; peptidyl-prolyl cis-trans isomerase activity; protein binding; nucleic acid binding; cyclosporin A binding; RNA binding; mRNA binding; poly(A) binding; unfolded protein binding |
| Cellular component | catalytic step 2 spliceosome; nucleoplasm; spliceosomal complex; nucleus; extracellular region; cytosol; nuclear speck; secretory granule lumen; ficolin-1-rich granule lumen; U2-type catalytic step 2 spliceosome |
| Biological process | regulation of transcription, DNA-templated; mRNA processing; protein peptidyl-prolyl isomerization; protein folding; RNA splicing; positive regulation of viral genome replication; transcription-coupled nucleotide-excision repair; mRNA splicing, via spliceosome; neutrophil degranulation; protein refolding |
Sources:Amigo / QuickGO
Orthologs
| Databases | NCBI: entry; OMA: entry |
| Species | Human | Mouse |
| Entrez | 10450 | 56031 |
| Ensembl | ENSG00000084072 | ENSMUSG00000028651 |
| UniProt | Q9UNP9 | Q9QZH3 |
| RefSeq (mRNA) | NM_001195007; NM_006112; NM_203456; NM_203457; NM_001319293 | NM_019489 |
| RefSeq (protein) | NP_001181936; NP_001306222; NP_006103; NP_982281 | NP_062362 |
| Location (UCSC) | Chr 1: 39.69 – 39.76 Mb | Chr 4: 123.02 – 123.03 Mb |
| PubMed search |
- Wikidata
| View/Edit Human | View/Edit Mouse |

Peptidylprolyl isomerase E (cyclophilin E), also known as PPIE, is an enzyme which in humans is encoded by the PPIE gene on chromosome 1. As a member of the peptidyl-prolyl cis-trans isomerase (PPIase) family, this protein catalyzes the cis-trans isomerization of proline imidic peptide bonds, which allows it to facilitate folding or repair of proteins. In addition, PPIE participates in many biological processes, including mitochondrial metabolism, apoptosis, and inflammation, as well as related diseases and conditions, such as ischemic reperfusion injury, AIDS, influenza, and cancer.

== Structure ==
Like other cyclophilins, PPIE forms a β-barrel structure with a hydrophobic core. This β-barrel is composed of eight anti-parallel β-strands and capped by two α-helices at the top and bottom. In addition, the β-turns and loops in the strands contribute to the flexibility of the barrel. In particular, PPIE contains two RNA-binding domains at the N-terminal and a 165-bases long PPIase domain at the C-terminal. The PPIase domain is homologous to PPIA and can be bound and inhibited by CsA.

== Function ==
The protein encoded by this gene is a member of the peptidyl-prolyl cis-trans isomerase (PPIase) family. PPIases catalyze the cis-trans isomerization of proline imidic peptide bonds in oligopeptides and accelerate the folding of proteins. Generally, PPIases are found in all eubacteria and eukaryotes, as well as in a few archaebacteria, and thus are highly conserved. The PPIase family is further divided into three structurally distinct subfamilies: cyclophilin (CyP), FK506-binding protein (FKBP), and parvulin (Pvn). As a cyclophilin, PPI binds cyclosporin A (CsA) and can be found within the cell or secreted by the cell. In eukaryotes, cyclophilins localize ubiquitously to many cell and tissue types. In addition to PPIase and protein chaperone activities, cyclophilins function in mitochondrial metabolism, apoptosis, immunological response, inflammation, and cell growth and proliferation. PPIE in particular also exhibits RNA-binding activity.

== Clinical significance ==
Due to the close homology in the PPIase domain between PPIE and PPIA, PPIE may also be involved in the replication process of HIV. Moreover, PPIE helps to prevent infections by influenza A virus. As a cyclophilin, PPIE also binds the immunosuppressive drug CsA to form a CsA-cyclophilin complex, which then targets calcineurin to inhibit the signaling pathway for T-cell activation.

In cardiac myogenic cells, cyclophilins have been observed to be activated by heat shock and hypoxia-reoxygenation as well as complex with heat shock proteins. Thus, cyclophilins may function in cardioprotection during ischemia-reperfusion injury.

Currently, cyclophilin expression is highly correlated with cancer pathogenesis, but the specific mechanisms remain to be elucidated.

== Interactions ==
PPIE (gene) has been shown to interact with CsA and MLL.
