= PPIL2 =

Protein-coding gene in the species Homo sapiens

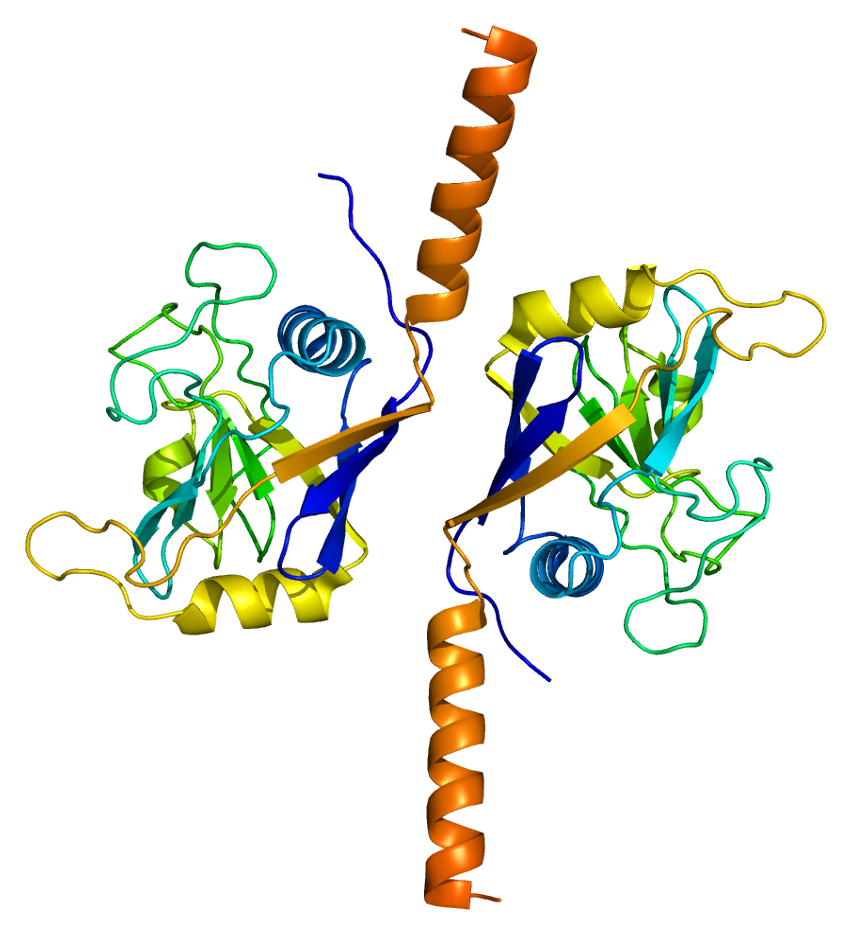

Identifiers
- Aliases: PPIL2, CYC4, CYP60, Cyp-60, UBOX7, hCyP-60, peptidylprolyl isomerase like 2
- External IDs: OMIM: 607588; MGI: 2447857; GeneCards: PPIL2
Available structures
PDB	Ortholog search: PDBe RCSB
PDB	List of PDB id codes 1ZKC
Enzyme activity
EC #	BRENDA	ExPASy	KEGG	MetaCyc
2.3.2.27	↗	↗	↗	↗

Gene location (Human)
Chr.	Chromosome 22 (human)
Band	22q11.21-q11.22	Start	21,666,000 bp
Band	22q11.21-q11.22	End	21,700,015 bp

Gene location (Mouse)
Chr.	Chromosome 16 (mouse)
Band	16|16 A3	Start	16,904,419 bp
Band	16|16 A3	End	16,929,121 bp
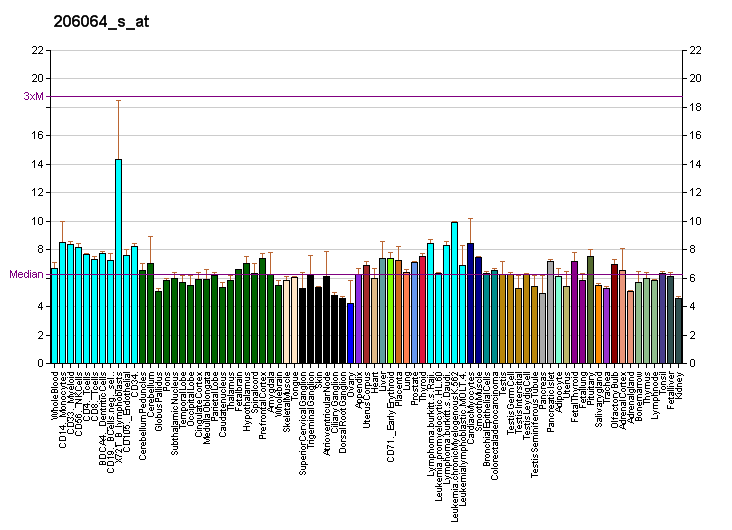

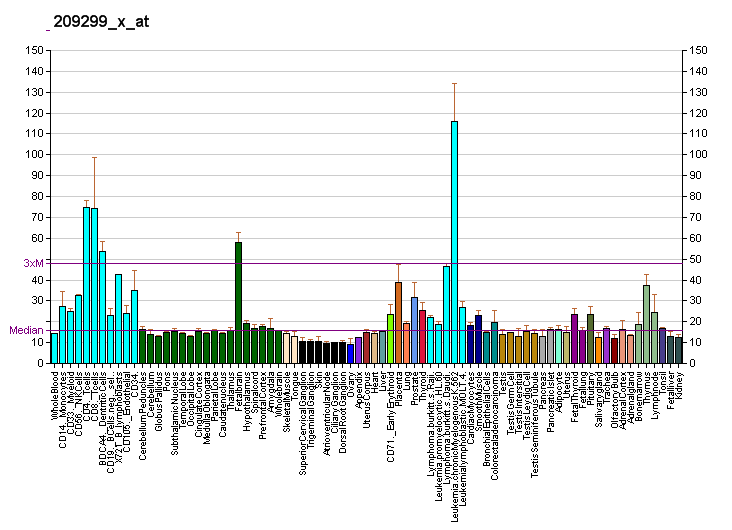

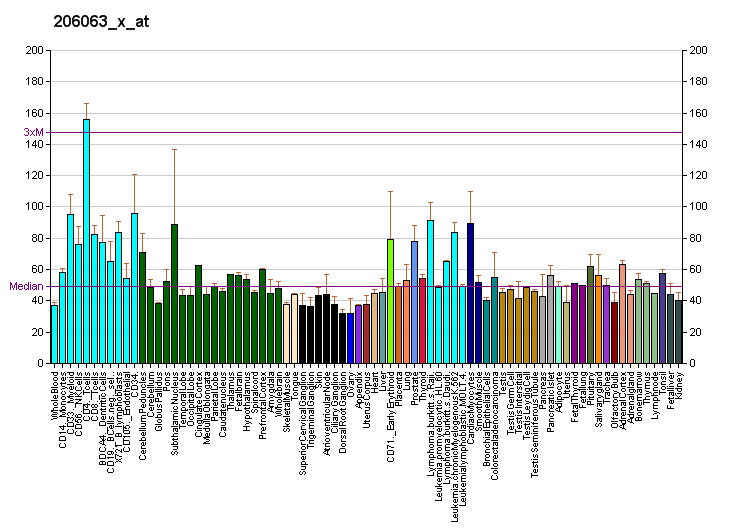
RNA expression pattern
Bgee	Human / Mouse (ortholog); Top expressed in: right lobe of thyroid gland; left lobe of thyroid gland; granulocyte; body of pancreas; gastric mucosa; minor salivary glands; apex of heart; body of stomach; nipple; anterior pituitary / Top expressed in: spermatocyte; spermatid; genital tubercle; tail of embryo; ventricular zone; thymus; neural layer of retina; neural tube; right kidney; granulocyte; More reference expression data
BioGPS	More reference expression data
Gene ontology
Molecular function	ubiquitin-ubiquitin ligase activity; protein binding; isomerase activity; ubiquitin protein ligase activity; ubiquitin-protein transferase activity; transferase activity; peptidyl-prolyl cis-trans isomerase activity; cyclosporin A binding
Cellular component	cytoplasm; Golgi lumen; plasma membrane; nucleus; nucleoplasm
Biological process	protein polyubiquitination; protein localization to plasma membrane; protein folding; protein ubiquitination; leukocyte migration; protein peptidyl-prolyl isomerization
Sources:Amigo / QuickGO
Orthologs
Databases	NCBI: entry; OMA: entry
Species	Human	Mouse
Entrez	23759	66053
Ensembl	ENSG00000100023	ENSMUSG00000022771
UniProt	Q13356	Q9D787
RefSeq (mRNA)	NM_014337; NM_148175; NM_148176; NM_001317996	NM_001252444; NM_001252445; NM_144954; NM_001356386
RefSeq (protein)	NP_001304925; NP_055152; NP_680480; NP_680481	NP_001239373; NP_001239374; NP_659203; NP_001343315
Location (UCSC)	Chr 22: 21.67 – 21.7 Mb	Chr 16: 16.9 – 16.93 Mb
PubMed search
- Wikidata
View/Edit Human	View/Edit Mouse

Peptidyl-prolyl cis-trans isomerase-like 2 is an enzyme that in humans is encoded by the PPIL2 gene.

This gene is a member of the cyclophilin family of peptidylprolyl isomerases. The cyclophilins are a highly conserved ubiquitous family, members of which play an important role in protein folding, immunosuppression by cyclosporin A, and infection of HIV-1 virions. This protein interacts with the proteinase inhibitor eglin c and is localized in the nucleus. Multiple transcript variants encoding different isoforms have been found for this gene.
