= Proline 3-hydroxylase =

Identifiers
- EC no.: 1.14.11.28

Databases
- IntEnz: IntEnz view
- BRENDA: BRENDA entry
- ExPASy: NiceZyme view
- KEGG: KEGG entry
- MetaCyc: metabolic pathway
- PRIAM: profile
- PDB structures: RCSB PDB PDBe PDBsum
Search
- PMC: articles
- PubMed: articles
- NCBI: proteins

Proline 3-hydroxylase (EC 1.14.11.28) is an enzyme that catalyzes the chemical reaction:

L-proline
Fe(IV)=O
Fe(II)
cis-3-hydroxy-L-proline

The systematic name of this enzyme class is L-proline,2-oxoglutarate:oxygen oxidoreductase (3-hydroxylating). This enzyme is also called P-3-H. It is an oxidase which uses molecular oxygen as oxidant, with incorporation of one of its atoms. These enzymes are non-heme iron proteins with ferryl active site where Fe(IV)=O is the species that transfers its oxygen to the substrate.

The mechanism used by these 2-oxoglutarate-dependent oxygenases requires 2-oxoglutaric acid to activate the iron oxygen complex, and this gives succinic acid and carbon dioxide when the second atom of the molecular oxygen is removed.

2-oxoglutaric acid
[O]
CO_{2}
succinic acid
