= Peptidylprolyl isomerase A =

Protein-coding gene in the species Homo sapiens

PPIA
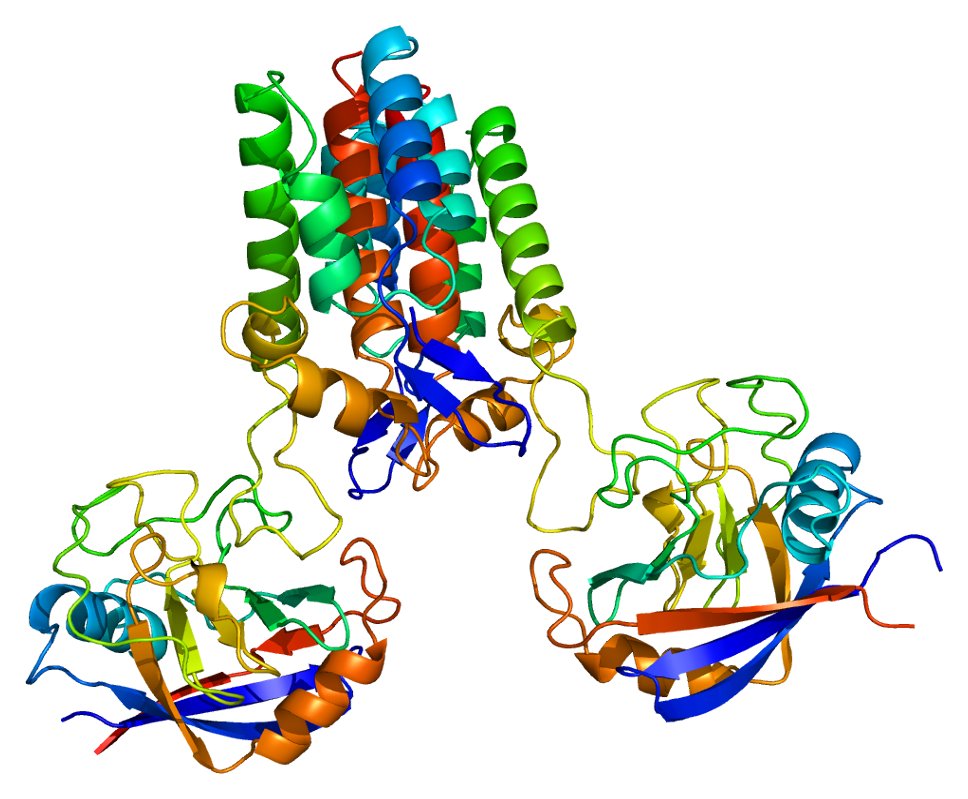

Identifiers
- Aliases: PPIA, CYPA, CYPH, HEL-S-69p, Peptidylprolyl isomerase A
- External IDs: OMIM: 123840; MGI: 97749; GeneCards: PPIA
Available structures
PDB	Ortholog search: PDBe RCSB
PDB	List of PDB id codes 1AK4, 1AWQ, 1AWR, 1AWS, 1AWT, 1AWU, 1AWV, 1BCK, 1CWA, 1CWB, 1CWC, 1CWF, 1CWH, 1CWI, 1CWJ, 1CWK, 1CWL, 1CWM, 1CWO, 1FGL, 1M63, 1M9C, 1M9D, 1M9E, 1M9F, 1M9X, 1M9Y, 1MF8, 1MIK, 1NMK, 1OCA, 1RMH, 1VBS, 1VBT, 1W8L, 1W8M, 1W8V, 1YND, 1ZKF, 2ALF, 2CPL, 2CYH, 2MZU, 2N0T, 2RMA, 2RMB, 2X25, 2X2A, 2X2C, 2X2D, 2XGY, 3CYH, 3CYS, 3K0M, 3K0N, 3K0O, 3K0P, 3K0Q, 3K0R, 3ODI, 3ODL, 3RDD, 4CYH, 4IPZ, 4N1M, 4N1N, 4N1O, 4N1P, 4N1Q, 4N1R, 4N1S, 4YUO, 5CYH, 2MS4, 4YUG, 4YUH, 4YUI, 4YUJ, 4YUK, 4YUL, 4YUM, 4YUN, 4YUP, 5F66, 5FJB
Enzyme activity
EC #	BRENDA	ExPASy	KEGG	MetaCyc
5.2.1.8	↗	↗	↗	↗

Gene location (Human)
Chr.	Chromosome 7 (human)
Band	7p13	Start	44,796,680 bp
Band	7p13	End	44,824,564 bp
RNA expression pattern
Bgee	Human / Mouse (ortholog); Top expressed in: ventricular zone; right frontal lobe; mucosa of transverse colon; anterior cingulate cortex; right hemisphere of cerebellum; ganglionic eminence; stromal cell of endometrium; rectum; C1 segment; upper lobe of left lung / n/a; More reference expression data
BioGPS	n/a
Gene ontology
Molecular function	protein binding; virion binding; unfolded protein binding; isomerase activity; peptidyl-prolyl cis-trans isomerase activity; RNA binding; cyclosporin A binding
Cellular component	cytoplasm; nucleus; membrane; focal adhesion; cytosol; extracellular region; secretory granule lumen; ficolin-1-rich granule lumen; vesicle; extracellular exosome; extracellular space; protein-containing complex
Biological process	viral life cycle; positive regulation of protein secretion; regulation of viral genome replication; uncoating of virus; lipid droplet organization; virion assembly; leukocyte migration; RNA-dependent DNA biosynthetic process; positive regulation of viral genome replication; viral release from host cell; establishment of integrated proviral latency; protein peptidyl-prolyl isomerization; protein folding; fusion of virus membrane with host plasma membrane; viral process; neutrophil degranulation; interleukin-12-mediated signaling pathway; protein refolding
Sources:Amigo / QuickGO
Orthologs
Databases	NCBI: entry; OMA: entry
Species	Human	Mouse
Entrez	5478	268373
Ensembl	ENSG00000196262	ENSMUSG00000071866
UniProt	P62937	P17742
RefSeq (mRNA)	NM_203431; NM_001300981; NM_021130; NM_203430	NM_008907
RefSeq (protein)	NP_001287910; NP_066953	NP_032933
Location (UCSC)	Chr 7: 44.8 – 44.82 Mb	n/a
PubMed search
- Wikidata
View/Edit Human	View/Edit Mouse

Peptidylprolyl isomerase A (PPIA), also known as cyclophilin A (CypA) or rotamase A is an enzyme that in humans is encoded by the PPIA gene on chromosome 7. As a member of the peptidyl-prolyl cis-trans isomerase (PPIase) family, this protein catalyzes the cis-trans isomerization of proline imidic peptide bonds, which allows it to regulate many biological processes, including intracellular signaling, transcription, inflammation, and apoptosis. Due to its various functions, PPIA has been implicated in a broad range of inflammatory diseases, including atherosclerosis and arthritis, and viral infections.

== Structure ==
PPIA is an 18 kDa, 165-amino acid long cytosolic protein. Like other cyclophilins, PPIA forms a β-barrel structure with a hydrophobic core. This β-barrel is composed of eight anti-parallel β-strands and capped by two α-helices at the top and bottom. In addition, the β-turns and loops in the strands contribute to the flexibility of the barrel. Its active site is a hydrophobic pocket that binds peptides containing proline. Cyclosporine can bind this pocket to inhibit the protein's enzymatic activity.

== Function ==
This gene encodes a member of the peptidyl-prolyl cis-trans isomerase (PPIase) family. PPIases catalyze the cis-trans isomerization of proline imidic peptide bonds in oligopeptides and accelerate protein folding. Generally, PPIases are found in all eubacteria and eukaryotes, as well as in a few archaebacteria, and thus are highly conserved. Of the 18 known human cyclophilins, PPIA is the most abundantly expressed isozyme. In particular, PPIA is predominantly expressed in the nucleus and cytoplasm of the cell, where it partakes in intracellular signaling, protein transport, and transcription regulation. In hemopoietic cells, subcellular localization of PPIA from the nucleus to the cytoplasm has been observed during c-Jun N-terminal kinase- and serine protease-dependent microtubule disruption. This localization has been correlated with G2/M arrest, indicating that the protein's PPIase function may be regulated by microtubule dynamics during the cell cycle. PPIA has also been associated with the mitochondria.

Moreover, the enzyme participates in inflammatory and apoptotic processes in extracellular settings. In the presence of reactive oxygen species (ROS), vascular smooth muscle cells (VSMCs), monocytes/macrophages, and endothelial cells (ECs) secrete PPIA to induce an inflammatory response and mitigate tissue injury. PPIA may also activate Akt and NF-κB signaling, resulting in the upregulation of Bcl-2, an antiapoptotic protein, and thus preventing apoptosis in ECs in response to oxidative stress. PPIA may also regulate ERK1/2, JNK, p38 kinase, Akt, and IκB signalling pathways through activating the CD147 receptor. PPIA-mediated activation of the ERK, JNK, and p38 kinase pathways also contributes to angiogenesis. Additionally, PPIA induces cell migration and proliferation in smooth muscle. In the case of T cells, PPIA regulates the T-cell-specific tyrosine kinase ITK upon T-cell receptor stimulation.

== Clinical significance ==
The PPIA protein is an important apoptotic constituent. During a normal embryologic processes, or during cell injury (such as ischemia-reperfusion injury during heart attacks and strokes) or during developments and processes in cancer, an apoptotic cell undergoes structural changes including cell shrinkage, plasma membrane blebbing, nuclear condensation, and fragmentation of the DNA and nucleus. This is followed by fragmentation into apoptotic bodies that are quickly removed by phagocytes, thereby preventing an inflammatory response. It is a mode of cell death defined by characteristic morphological, biochemical and molecular changes. It was first described as a "shrinkage necrosis", and then this term was replaced by apoptosis to emphasize its role opposite mitosis in tissue kinetics. In later stages of apoptosis the entire cell becomes fragmented, forming a number of plasma membrane-bounded apoptotic bodies which contain nuclear and or cytoplasmic elements. The ultrastructural appearance of necrosis is quite different, the main features being mitochondrial swelling, plasma membrane breakdown and cellular disintegration. Apoptosis occurs in many physiological and pathological processes. It plays an important role during embryonal development as programmed cell death and accompanies a variety of normal involutional processes in which it serves as a mechanism to remove "unwanted" cells.

As a proinflammatory cytokine, PPIA is highly involved in acute and chronic inflammatory diseases, including sepsis, atherosclerosis, and rheumatoid arthritis. Thus, therapeutic targeting of PPIA with selective inhibitors may prove effective in combatting such inflammatory diseases and symptoms. Correlation between plasma PPIA levels and hyperglycemia symptoms also promotes utilization of PPIA as a biomarker for diabetes and vascular disease.

Furthermore, PPIA is involved in cerebral hypoxia-ischemia by contributing to the nuclear transport of AIF, a proapoptotic factor, in neurons. To maintain the integrity of the blood brain barrier and mitigate brain injury, PPIA helps to recruit circulating monocytes and stimulates survival and growth pathways. In cardiac myogenic cells, cyclophilins have been observed to be activated by heat shock and hypoxia-reoxygenation as well as complex with heat shock proteins. Thus, cyclophilins may function in cardioprotection during ischemia-reperfusion injury.

Currently, PPIA expression is highly correlated with cancer pathogenesis, but the specific mechanisms remain to be elucidated. PPIA overexpression has been associated with hepatocellular carcinoma, lung cancer, pancreatic adenocarcinoma, endometrial carcinoma, esophageal squamous cell carcinoma, and melanoma.

The protein can also interact with several HIV proteins, including p55 gag, Vpr, and capsid protein, and has been shown to be necessary for the formation of infectious HIV virions. As a result, PPIA contributes to viral diseases such as AIDS, hepatitis C, measles, and influenza A.

== Interactions ==
Peptidylprolyl isomerase A has been shown to interact with:

- ITK,
- CD147,
- P53,
- STAT3,

== See also ==
- Cyclophilin
- TRIM5alpha
