= PPIL4 =

Protein-coding gene in the species Homo sapiens

Identifiers
- Aliases: PPIL4, HDCME13P, peptidylprolyl isomerase like 4
- External IDs: OMIM: 607609; MGI: 1914668; GeneCards: PPIL4
Enzyme activity
EC #	BRENDA	ExPASy	KEGG	MetaCyc
5.2.1.8	↗	↗	↗	↗

Gene location (Human)
Chr.	Chromosome 6 (human)
Band	6q25.1	Start	149,504,495 bp
Band	6q25.1	End	149,546,043 bp

Gene location (Mouse)
Chr.	Chromosome 10 (mouse)
Band	10|10 A1	Start	7,668,655 bp
Band	10|10 A1	End	7,698,899 bp
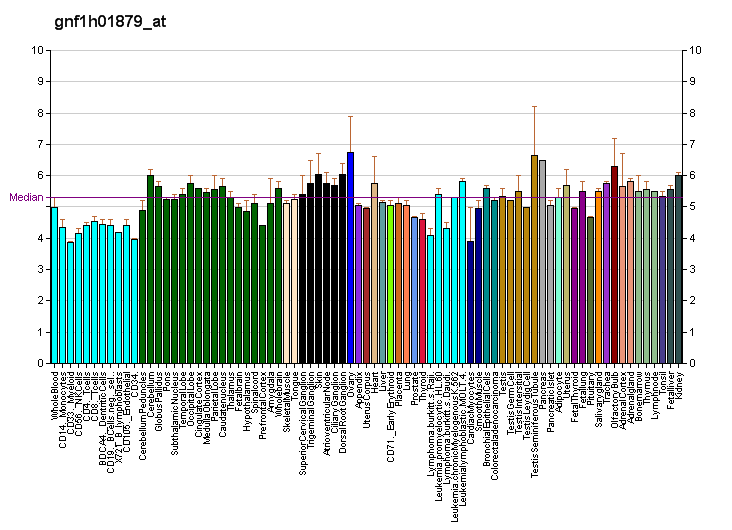

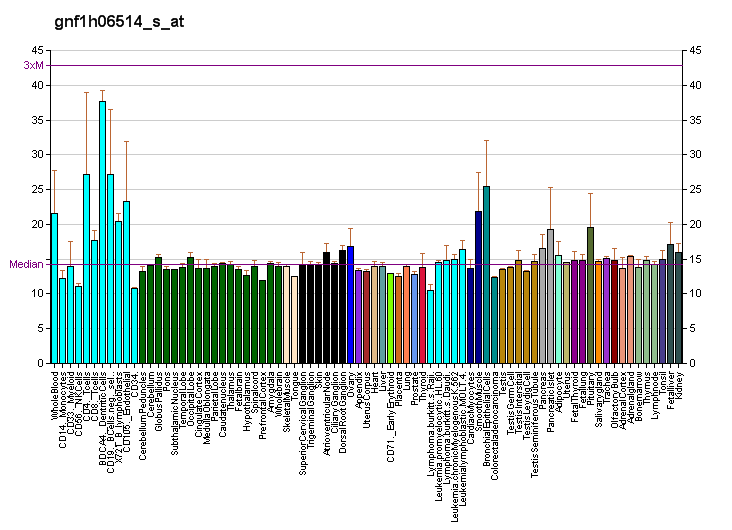

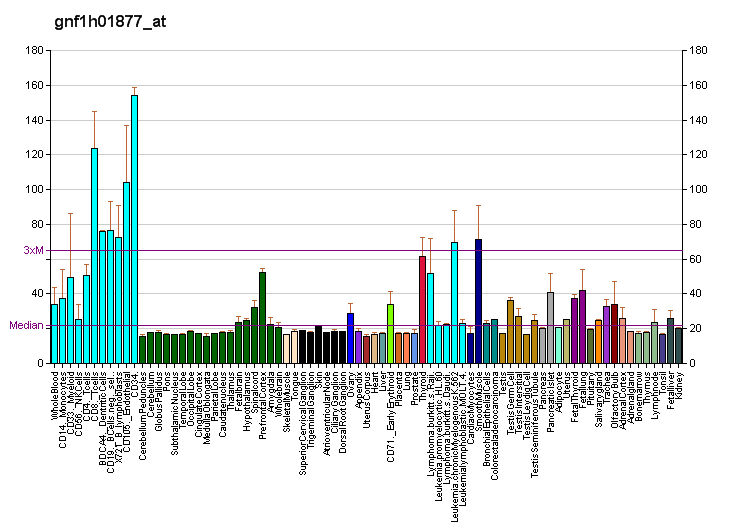
RNA expression pattern
Bgee	Human / Mouse (ortholog); Top expressed in: Achilles tendon; epithelium of colon; testicle; left ovary; gonad; ventricular zone; right ovary; endometrium; islet of Langerhans; thymus / Top expressed in: saccule; otic vesicle; otic placode; zygote; primitive streak; granulocyte; pituitary gland; seminal vesicula; neural layer of retina; blood; More reference expression data
BioGPS	More reference expression data
Gene ontology
Molecular function	isomerase activity; nucleic acid binding; RNA binding; peptidyl-prolyl cis-trans isomerase activity
Cellular component	nucleus; nucleoplasm; cytosol
Biological process	protein peptidyl-prolyl isomerization; regulation of phosphorylation of RNA polymerase II C-terminal domain
Sources:Amigo / QuickGO
Orthologs
Databases	NCBI: entry; OMA: entry
Species	Human	Mouse
Entrez	85313	67418
Ensembl	ENSG00000131013	ENSMUSG00000015757
UniProt	Q8WUA2	Q9CXG3
RefSeq (mRNA)	NM_139126	NM_026141
RefSeq (protein)	NP_624311	NP_080417
Location (UCSC)	Chr 6: 149.5 – 149.55 Mb	Chr 10: 7.67 – 7.7 Mb
PubMed search
- Wikidata
View/Edit Human	View/Edit Mouse

Peptidyl-prolyl cis-trans isomerase-like 4 is an enzyme that in humans is encoded by the PPIL4 gene.

This gene is a member of the cyclophilin family of peptidylprolyl isomerases. The cyclophilins are a highly conserved family, members of which play an important role in protein folding, immunosuppression by cyclosporin A, and infection of HIV-1 virions.
