= SC65 =

Protein-coding gene in the species Homo sapiens

P3H4

Identifiers
- Aliases: P3H4, NO55, NOL55, SC65, LEPREL4, prolyl 3-hydroxylase family member 4 (non-enzymatic), prolyl 3-hydroxylase family member 4 (inactive)
- External IDs: OMIM: 617419; MGI: 1913430; HomoloGene: 4713; GeneCards: P3H4; OMA:P3H4 - orthologs

Gene location (Human)
Chr.	Chromosome 17 (human)
Band	17q21.2	Start	41,801,947 bp
Band	17q21.2	End	41,812,604 bp

Gene location (Mouse)
Chr.	Chromosome 11 (mouse)
Band	11|11 D	Start	100,299,282 bp
Band	11|11 D	End	100,305,662 bp
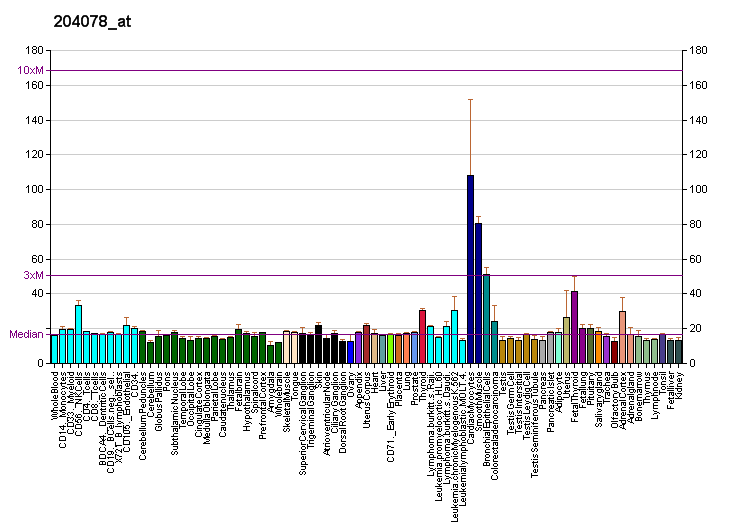
RNA expression pattern
Bgee	Human / Mouse (ortholog); Top expressed in: stromal cell of endometrium; periodontal fiber; tibia; ventricular zone; anterior pituitary; right lobe of thyroid gland; left adrenal cortex; tendon of biceps brachii; right adrenal gland; body of pancreas / Top expressed in: calvaria; molar; epithelium of lens; umbilical cord; upper jaw; body of femur; supraoptic nucleus; vestibular membrane of cochlear duct; ascending aorta; right ventricle; More reference expression data
BioGPS	More reference expression data
Orthologs
Species	Human	Mouse
Entrez	10609	66180
Ensembl	ENSG00000141696	ENSMUSG00000006931
UniProt	Q92791	Q8K2B0
RefSeq (mRNA)	NM_006455	NM_176830; NM_001378981
RefSeq (protein)	NP_006446	NP_789800; NP_001365910
Location (UCSC)	Chr 17: 41.8 – 41.81 Mb	Chr 11: 100.3 – 100.31 Mb
PubMed search
- Wikidata
View/Edit Human	View/Edit Mouse

Endoplasmic reticulum protein SC65, also known as Leprecan-like protein 4 (LEPREL4) or nucleolar autoantigen No55, is a protein that in humans is encoded by the P3H4 gene.

== Function ==
This nucleolar protein was first characterized because it was an autoantigen in cases on interstitial cystitis. The protein, with a predicted molecular weight of 50 kDa, appears to be localized in the particulate compartment of the interphase nucleolus, with a distribution distinct from that of nucleolar protein B23. During mitosis it is associated with chromosomes.
