= Leprecan =

Protein found in humans

P3H1

Identifiers
- Aliases: P3H1, GROS1, OI8, LEPRE1, prolyl 3-hydroxylase 1
- External IDs: OMIM: 610339; MGI: 1888921; GeneCards: P3H1
Enzyme activity
EC #	BRENDA	ExPASy	KEGG	MetaCyc
1.14.11.7	↗	↗	↗	↗

Gene location (Human)
Chr.	Chromosome 1 (human)
Band	1p34.2	Start	42,746,335 bp
Band	1p34.2	End	42,767,084 bp

Gene location (Mouse)
Chr.	Chromosome 4 (mouse)
Band	4|4 D2.1	Start	119,090,112 bp
Band	4|4 D2.1	End	119,106,172 bp
RNA expression pattern
Bgee	Human / Mouse (ortholog); Top expressed in: stromal cell of endometrium; anterior pituitary; tibial nerve; tibia; cartilage tissue; right ovary; left ovary; canal of the cervix; ascending aorta; body of uterus / Top expressed in: calvaria; cumulus cell; tail of embryo; dermis; genital tubercle; molar; fossa; facial skeleton; umbilical cord; long bone; More reference expression data
BioGPS	n/a
Gene ontology
Molecular function	iron ion binding; L-ascorbic acid binding; collagen binding; protein-containing complex binding; dioxygenase activity; metal ion binding; oxidoreductase activity, acting on paired donors, with incorporation or reduction of molecular oxygen; oxidoreductase activity; procollagen-proline 3-dioxygenase activity; molecular function; protein binding
Cellular component	protein-containing complex; endoplasmic reticulum lumen; membrane; extracellular region; endoplasmic reticulum; extracellular exosome; collagen-containing extracellular matrix
Biological process	regulation of protein secretion; protein stabilization; protein folding; negative regulation of post-translational protein modification; bone development; negative regulation of cell population proliferation; protein hydroxylation; chaperone-mediated protein folding; peptidyl-proline hydroxylation; collagen metabolic process; positive regulation of neuron projection development
Sources:Amigo / QuickGO
Orthologs
Databases	NCBI: entry; OMA: entry
Species	Human	Mouse
Entrez	64175	56401
Ensembl	ENSG00000117385	ENSMUSG00000028641
UniProt	Q32P28	Q3V1T4
RefSeq (mRNA)	NM_001146289; NM_001243246; NM_022356	NM_001042411; NM_001286148; NM_019782; NM_019783
RefSeq (protein)	NP_001139761; NP_001230175; NP_071751	NP_001035874; NP_001273077; NP_062756; NP_062757
Location (UCSC)	Chr 1: 42.75 – 42.77 Mb	Chr 4: 119.09 – 119.11 Mb
PubMed search
- Wikidata
View/Edit Human	View/Edit Mouse

leucine proline-enriched proteoglycan (leprecan) 1

Identifiers
- Symbol: P3H1, LEPRE1
- NCBI gene: 64175
- HGNC: 19316
- OMIM: 610339
- PDB: 8K0M
- RefSeq: NM_022356
- UniProt: Q32P28

Other data
- Locus: Chr. 1 p34.1
Search for
- Structures: Swiss-model
- Domains: InterPro

Leprecan (also called prolyl 3-hydroxylase 1) is an enzyme which in humans is encoded by the gene P3H1. Certain mutations in the gene have been associated with osteogenesis imperfecta type VIII.

Leprecan is part of a superfamily of 2OG-Fe(II) dioxygenase, along with DNA repair protein AlkB, and disease resistant EGL-9. The enzyme was found to be a type of hydroxylases used in the substrate formation of protein glycosylation.

== Activities ==
Leprecan, a proteoglycan, has demonstrated prolyl hydroxylase activity; prolyl hydroxylases hydroxylate proline residues. Prolyl 3-hydroxylase 1, P3H1, forms a larger complex with CRTAP and cyclophilin B, CyPB, in the endoplasimic reticulum. The complex hydroxylates a single proline residue, Pro986, on collagen chains. Recessive forms of Osteogenesis Imperfecta are partly caused by a mutation in the LEPRE1 gene. The mutation in the gene encodes prolyl 3-hydroxylase 1. The malfunctioning prolyl 3-hydroxylase in leprecan leads to inappropriate collagen folding. This is due to the instability caused by the absence of hydroxyproline. Hydroxyproline is the product of hydroxylating a proline residue.

== Structure ==
Leprecan, also known as P3H1, forms a tight complex with CRTAP and cyclophilin B (PPIB), a collagen processing enzyme complex named PCP complex (P3H1-CRTAP-PPIB). Cryo-electron microscopy (cryo-EM) studies have revealed that the PCP complex consists of P3H1, CRTAP, and PPIB in a 1:1:1 stoichiometry. The complex features a "face-to-face" spatial arrangement, with the prolyl hydroxylation site of the C-terminal domain of P3H1 and the prolyl isomerization site of PPIB positioned at the "top" of the complex. Below these dual-catalytic sites lies an X-shaped base formed by CRTAP and the N-terminal domain of P3H1, which exhibit similar 3D foldings. The surface of the PCP complex also harbors several potential collagen-binding sites, as indicated by EM density corresponding to a synthetic peptide with the COL1A1 sequence. Furthermore, the PCP complex has the ability to dimerize, forming a hexameric structure.
