= PPIL3 =

Protein-coding gene in the species Homo sapiens

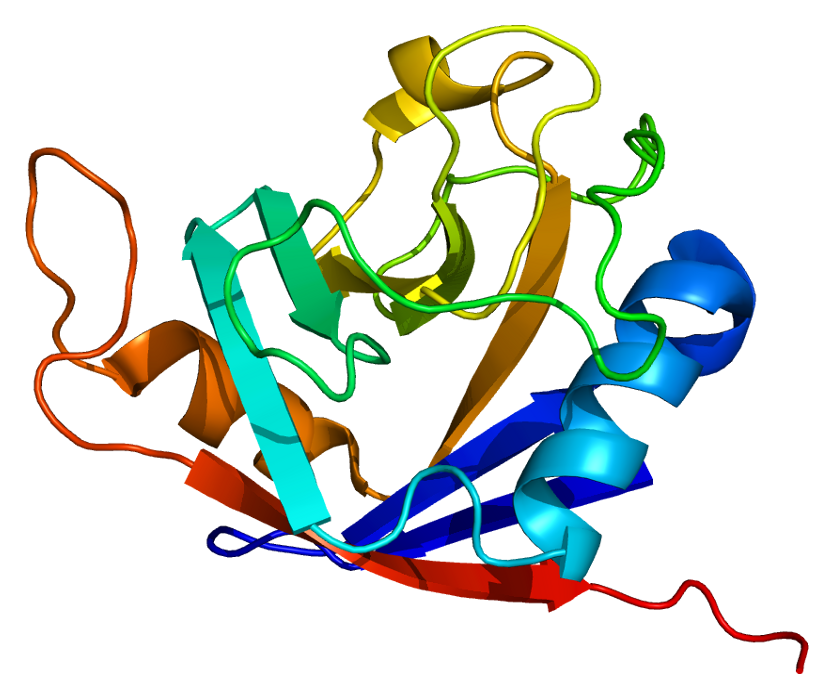

Identifiers
- Aliases: PPIL3, CYPJ, peptidylprolyl isomerase like 3
- External IDs: OMIM: 615811; MGI: 1917475; GeneCards: PPIL3
Available structures
PDB	Ortholog search: PDBe RCSB
PDB	List of PDB id codes 1XYH, 2OJU, 2OK3
Enzyme activity
EC #	BRENDA	ExPASy	KEGG	MetaCyc
5.2.1.8	↗	↗	↗	↗

Gene location (Human)
Chr.	Chromosome 2 (human)
Band	2q33.1	Start	200,870,907 bp
Band	2q33.1	End	200,889,303 bp

Gene location (Mouse)
Chr.	Chromosome 1 (mouse)
Band	1|1 C1.3	Start	58,470,153 bp
Band	1|1 C1.3	End	58,484,645 bp
RNA expression pattern
Bgee	Human / Mouse (ortholog); Top expressed in: mucosa of ileum; pancreatic epithelial cell; ganglionic eminence; myocardium of left ventricle; ventricular zone; secondary oocyte; right uterine tube; tibialis anterior muscle; germinal epithelium; tibia / Top expressed in: facial motor nucleus; endothelial cell of lymphatic vessel; hand; primitive streak; primary oocyte; otolith organ; utricle; superior cervical ganglion; medullary collecting duct; condyle; More reference expression data
BioGPS	n/a
Gene ontology
Molecular function	isomerase activity; protein binding; peptidyl-prolyl cis-trans isomerase activity
Cellular component	catalytic step 2 spliceosome; spliceosomal complex
Biological process	mRNA splicing, via spliceosome; mRNA processing; protein folding; RNA splicing; protein peptidyl-prolyl isomerization
Sources:Amigo / QuickGO
Orthologs
Databases	NCBI: entry; OMA: entry
Species	Human	Mouse
Entrez	53938	70225
Ensembl	ENSG00000240344	ENSMUSG00000026035
UniProt	Q9H2H8	Q9D6L8
RefSeq (mRNA)	NM_032472; NM_130906; NM_131916	NM_001285826; NM_001285827; NM_027351; NM_027374
RefSeq (protein)	NP_115861; NP_570981	NP_001272755; NP_001272756; NP_081627; NP_081650
Location (UCSC)	Chr 2: 200.87 – 200.89 Mb	Chr 1: 58.47 – 58.48 Mb
PubMed search
- Wikidata
View/Edit Human	View/Edit Mouse

Peptidyl-prolyl cis-trans isomerase-like 3 is an enzyme that in humans is encoded by the PPIL3 gene.

== Function ==
This gene encodes a member of the cyclophilin family. Cyclophilins catalyze the cis-trans isomerization of peptidylprolyl imide bonds in oligopeptides. They have been proposed to act either as catalysts or as molecular chaperones in protein-folding events. Transcript variants derived from alternative splicing and/or alternative polyadenylation exist; some of these variants encode different isoforms.
