= Cartilage associated protein =

Protein found in humans

CRTAP

Identifiers
- Aliases: CRTAP, CASP, LEPREL3, OI7, P3H5, cartilage associated protein
- External IDs: OMIM: 605497; MGI: 1891221; GeneCards: CRTAP

Gene location (Human)
Chr.	Chromosome 3 (human)
Band	3p22.3	Start	33,114,014 bp
Band	3p22.3	End	33,147,773 bp

Gene location (Mouse)
Chr.	Chromosome 9 (mouse)
Band	9|9 F3	Start	114,204,202 bp
Band	9|9 F3	End	114,219,743 bp
RNA expression pattern
Bgee	Human / Mouse (ortholog); Top expressed in: tendon of biceps brachii; stromal cell of endometrium; canal of the cervix; Descending thoracic aorta; right coronary artery; ascending aorta; body of uterus; gallbladder; popliteal artery; tibial arteries / Top expressed in: calvaria; body of femur; molar; stroma of bone marrow; efferent ductule; dermis; external carotid artery; sciatic nerve; atrium; internal carotid artery; More reference expression data
BioGPS	n/a
Gene ontology
Molecular function	protein-containing complex binding; protein binding
Cellular component	extracellular region; protein-containing complex; endoplasmic reticulum lumen; endoplasmic reticulum; extracellular space
Biological process	protein stabilization; negative regulation of post-translational protein modification; spermatogenesis; peptidyl-proline hydroxylation to 3-hydroxy-L-proline; chaperone-mediated protein folding
Sources:Amigo / QuickGO
Orthologs
Databases	NCBI: entry; OMA: entry
Species	Human	Mouse
Entrez	10491	56693
Ensembl	ENSG00000170275	ENSMUSG00000032431
UniProt	O75718	Q9CYD3
RefSeq (mRNA)	NM_006371	NM_019922
RefSeq (protein)	NP_006362	NP_064306
Location (UCSC)	Chr 3: 33.11 – 33.15 Mb	Chr 9: 114.2 – 114.22 Mb
PubMed search
- Wikidata
View/Edit Human	View/Edit Mouse

Cartilage associated protein is a protein that in humans is encoded by the CRTAP gene.

== Structure and function ==
The protein encoded by this gene is similar to the chicken and mouse CRTAP genes. The encoded protein is a scaffolding protein that may influence the activity of at least one member of the cytohesin/ARNO family in response to specific cellular stimuli.

CRTAP forms a tight protein complex with two other enzymes involved in post-translational modification: Leprecan (P3H1) and PPIB. In this complex, CRTAP acts as a collagen-binding site, capturing substrates for subsequent enzymatic processing by P3H1 and PPIB. Notably, CRTAP exhibits a folding pattern similar to the N-terminal domain of P3H1.

== Clinical significance ==
Mutations in the CRTAP gene are associated with osteogenesis imperfecta, types VII and IIB, a connective tissue disorder characterized by bone fragility and low bone mass.
