= Prolyl 3-hydroxylase 3 =

P3H3

Identifiers
- Aliases: P3H3, GRCB, HSU47926, LEPREL2, prolyl 3-hydroxylase 3
- External IDs: OMIM: 610342; MGI: 1315208; GeneCards: P3H3
Enzyme activity
EC #	BRENDA	ExPASy	KEGG	MetaCyc
1.14.11.7	↗	↗	↗	↗

Gene location (Human)
Chr.	Chromosome 12 (human)
Band	12p13.31	Start	6,828,407 bp
Band	12p13.31	End	6,839,847 bp

Gene location (Mouse)
Chr.	Chromosome 6 (mouse)
Band	6 F2|6 59.17 cM	Start	124,841,089 bp
Band	6 F2|6 59.17 cM	End	124,857,752 bp
RNA expression pattern
Bgee	Human / Mouse (ortholog); Top expressed in: stromal cell of endometrium; anterior pituitary; right hemisphere of cerebellum; body of uterus; apex of heart; right ovary; ascending aorta; Descending thoracic aorta; left ovary; canal of the cervix / Top expressed in: calvaria; saccule; external carotid artery; ascending aorta; aortic valve; internal carotid artery; vas deferens; dermis; neural layer of retina; fossa; More reference expression data
BioGPS	n/a
Gene ontology
Molecular function	oxidoreductase activity, acting on paired donors, with incorporation or reduction of molecular oxygen; L-ascorbic acid binding; dioxygenase activity; iron ion binding; oxidoreductase activity; metal ion binding; procollagen-proline 3-dioxygenase activity
Cellular component	endoplasmic reticulum; catalytic complex
Biological process	negative regulation of cell population proliferation; peptidyl-proline hydroxylation; collagen metabolic process; peptidyl-lysine hydroxylation; collagen biosynthetic process
Sources:Amigo / QuickGO
Orthologs
Databases	NCBI: entry; OMA: entry
Species	Human	Mouse
Entrez	10536	14789
Ensembl	ENSG00000110811	ENSMUSG00000023191
UniProt	Q8IVL6	Q8CG70
RefSeq (mRNA)	NM_014262	NM_013534
RefSeq (protein)	NP_055077	NP_038562
Location (UCSC)	Chr 12: 6.83 – 6.84 Mb	Chr 6: 124.84 – 124.86 Mb
PubMed search
- Wikidata
View/Edit Human	View/Edit Mouse

Prolyl 3-hydroxylase 3 is an enzyme that in humans is encoded by the gene P3H3 (formally LEPREL2). As its name suggests, it acts as a collagen prolyl 3-hydroxylase.
