= PPIH =

Protein-coding gene in humans

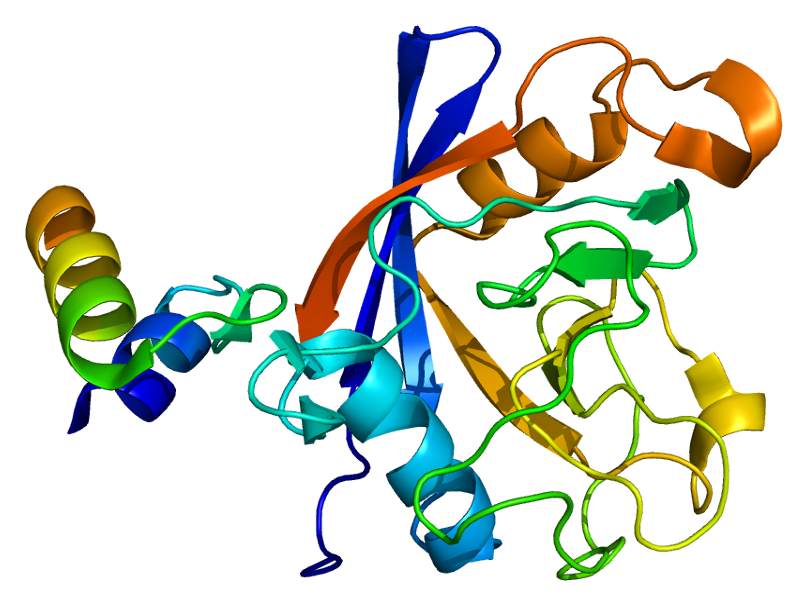

Identifiers
- Aliases: PPIH, CYP-20, CYPH, SnuCyp-20, USA-CYP, peptidylprolyl isomerase H
- External IDs: OMIM: 606095; MGI: 106499; GeneCards: PPIH
Available structures
PDB	Ortholog search: PDBe RCSB
PDB	List of PDB id codes 1MZW, 1QOI
Enzyme activity
EC #	BRENDA	ExPASy	KEGG	MetaCyc
5.2.1.8	↗	↗	↗	↗

Gene location (Human)
Chr.	Chromosome 1 (human)
Band	1p34.2	Start	42,658,335 bp
Band	1p34.2	End	42,676,758 bp

Gene location (Mouse)
Chr.	Chromosome 4 (mouse)
Band	4 D2.1|4 55.34 cM	Start	119,157,207 bp
Band	4 D2.1|4 55.34 cM	End	119,177,743 bp
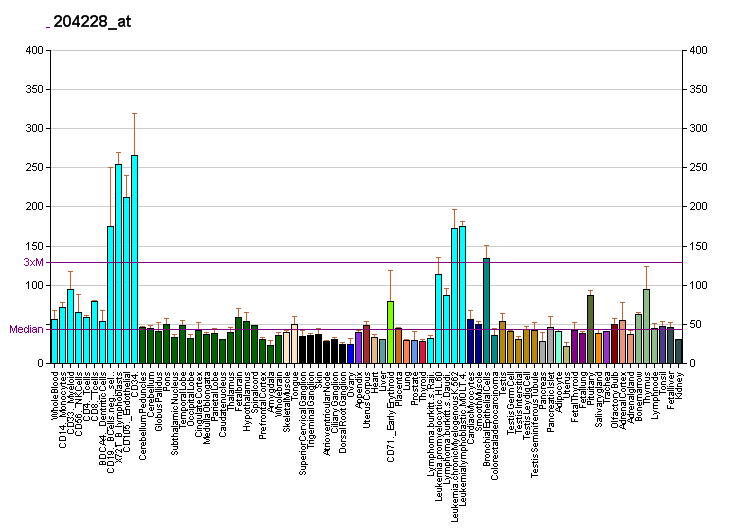
RNA expression pattern
Bgee	Human / Mouse (ortholog); Top expressed in: embryo; ventricular zone; ganglionic eminence; mucosa of transverse colon; granulocyte; secondary oocyte; rectum; mucosa of esophagus; olfactory zone of nasal mucosa; lymph node / Top expressed in: ventricular zone; embryo; spermatocyte; embryo; yolk sac; morula; blastocyst; spermatid; genital tubercle; zygote; More reference expression data
BioGPS	More reference expression data
Gene ontology
Molecular function	ribonucleoprotein complex binding; isomerase activity; protein binding; peptidyl-prolyl cis-trans isomerase activity; cyclosporin A binding; unfolded protein binding
Cellular component	cytoplasm; nuclear speck; U4/U6 x U5 tri-snRNP complex; spliceosomal complex; nucleus; nucleoplasm; U4/U6 snRNP
Biological process	mRNA splicing, via spliceosome; mRNA processing; positive regulation of viral genome replication; protein folding; RNA splicing; protein-containing complex assembly; protein peptidyl-prolyl isomerization; angiogenesis; protein refolding
Sources:Amigo / QuickGO
Orthologs
Databases	NCBI: entry; OMA: entry
Species	Human	Mouse
Entrez	10465	66101
Ensembl	ENSG00000171960	ENSMUSG00000060288
UniProt	O43447	Q9D868
RefSeq (mRNA)	NM_006347; NM_001330510	NM_001110129; NM_001110130; NM_028677
RefSeq (protein)	NP_001317439; NP_006338	NP_001103599; NP_001103600; NP_082953
Location (UCSC)	Chr 1: 42.66 – 42.68 Mb	Chr 4: 119.16 – 119.18 Mb
PubMed search
- Wikidata
View/Edit Human	View/Edit Mouse

Peptidyl-prolyl cis-trans isomerase H is an enzyme that in humans is encoded by the PPIH gene.

The protein encoded by this gene is a member of the peptidyl-prolyl cis-trans isomerase (PPIase) family. PPIases catalyze the cis-trans isomerization of proline imidic peptide bonds in oligopeptides and accelerate the folding of proteins. This protein is a specific component of the complex that includes pre-mRNA processing factors PRPF3, PRPF4, and PRPF18, as well as U4/U5/U6 tri-snRNP. This protein has been shown to possess PPIase activity and may act as a protein chaperone that mediates the interactions between different proteins inside the spliceosome.
